= List of moths of Sri Lanka =

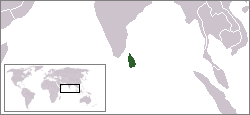
Location of Sri Lanka

Sri Lanka is a tropical island situated close to the southern tip of India. The invertebrate fauna is as large as it is common to other regions of the world. There are about 2 million species of arthropods found in the world, and still it is counting. So many new species are discover up to this time also. So it is very complicated and difficult to summarize the exact number of species found within a certain region.

The following is an incomplete list of the moths of Sri Lanka.

== Moth ==
Moths are lepidopterans that classified together with their beautiful partners, the butterflies. The two types are easily recognized by first sight with a good naked eye. The main differences are as follows.

Feature	Butterflies	Moths
Shape and structure of antennae	thin slender filamentous antennae which are club-shaped at the end.	comb-like or feathery antennae, or filamentous and unclubbed.
Wing-coupling mechanisms	lack a frenulum.	have a frenulum which is a filament arising from the hindwing and coupling (matching up) with barbs on the forewing. The frenulum can be observed only when a specimen is in hand. Some moths have a lobe on the forewing called a jugum that helps in coupling with the hindwing.
Pupae	form an exposed pupa, also termed a chrysalis.	moth caterpillars spin a cocoon made of silk within which they metamorphose into the pupal stage.
Colouration of the wings	bright colours on their wings.	usually plain brown, grey, white or black and often with obscuring patterns of zigzags or swirls.
Activity	diurnal.	nocturnal and crepuscular.
Structure of the body	have slender and smoother abdomens.	have stout and hairy or furry-looking bodies.
Scales	possess fine scales.	larger scales on their wings which makes them look more dense and fluffy.
Appearance of eyes	apposition eyes.	superposition eyes.
Resting posture	fold their wings above their backs when they are perched.	rest with their wings spread out to their sides.

Within Sri Lanka, the latest revision of lepidopterans described 1903 species with 58 families of butterflies and moths. Out of these 1905 species, 208 species are butterflies and 1697 species are moths.The endemic genus Patulognatha with two new species were recorded in 2024.

The family-wise number of moth species are:

Family	Common name	Species
Alucitidae	-	11
Autostichidae	-	6
Batrachedridae	-	6
Bombycidae	Silkworm moths	3
Brachodidae	Little bear moths	6
Callidulidae	Day flying moths	1
Carposinidae	-	4
Choreutidae	Metalmark moths	15
Coleophoridae	-	1
Coleophoridae	-	1
Cosmopterigidae	Cosmet moths	30
Cossidae	Carpenter millers	13
Crambidae	Grass moths	266
Drepanidae	Hooktip moths	9
Depressariidae	-	2
Dudgeoneidae	-	1
Elachistidae	Grass miner moths	10
Epipyropidae	Planthopper parasite moths	3
Erebidae	Underwing moths	466
Ethmiidae	-	1
Eupterotidae	Giant lappet moths	15
Gelechiidae	Twirler moths	66
Geometridae	Geometer moths	219
Glyphipterigidae	Sedge moths	14
Gracillariidae	Leaf-blotch miner moths	56
Hepialidae	Ghost moths	3
Hyblaeidae	Teak moths	2
Immidae	Imma moths	13
Lacturidae	Tropical burnet moths	2
Lasiocampidae	Tent moths	15
Lecithoceridae	Long horned moths	95
Limacodidae	Slug caterpillar moths	26
Lyonetiidae	Lyonet moths	7
Momphidae	Mompha moths	4
Nepticulidae	-	2
Noctuidae	Owlet moths	179
Nolidae	Nolid moths	70
Notodontidae	Prominent moths	40
Plutellidae	Diamondback moths	1
Pterophoridae	Plume moths	32
Psychidae	Bagworm moths	36
Pyralidae	Snout moths	90
Saturniidae	Giant silkworm moths	7
Sesiidae	Clearwing moths	2
Sphingidae	Sphinx moths	55
Thyrididae	Picture-winged leaf moths	21
Tineidae	Fungus moths	44
Tortricidae	Leaf-roller moths	174
Uraniidae	Swallowtail moths	31
Urodidae	False burnet moths	1
Xyloryctidae	Giant micromoths	2
Yponomeutidae	Ermine moths	2
Zygaenidae	Burnet moths	13

== Checklist of species ==
=== Alucitidae ===
- Alucita ischalea (Meyrick, 1905
- Alucita mesolychna (Meyrick, 1907)
- Alucita microscopica (T. B. Fletcher, 1910)
- Alucita montigena (T. B. Fletcher, 1910)
- Alucita niphostrota (Meyrick, 1907)
- Alucita postfasciata T. B. Fletcher, 1910
- Alucita sycophanta (Meyrick, 1906)
- Alucita thapsina (Meyrick, 1905)
- Alucita toxophila (Meyrick, 1906)
- Alucita trachyptera (Meyrick, 1906)
- Triscaedecia dactyloptera Hampson, 1905
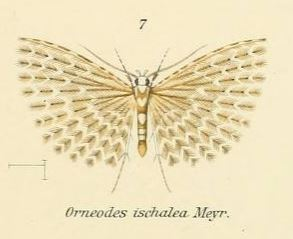
Alucita ischalea

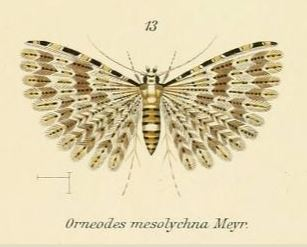
Alucita mesolychna

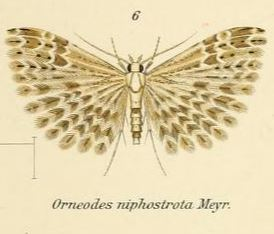
Alucita niphostrota

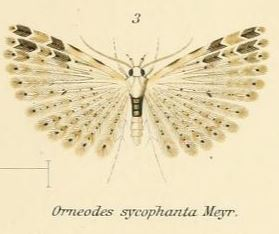
Alucita sycophanta

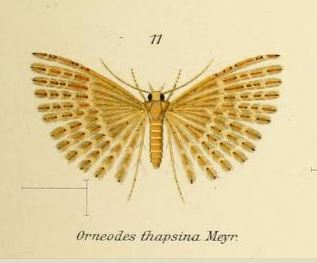
Alucita thapsina

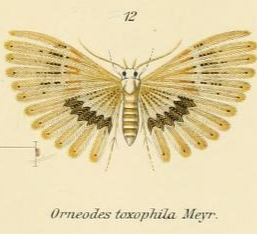
Alucita toxophila

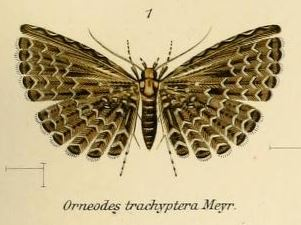
Alucita trachyptera

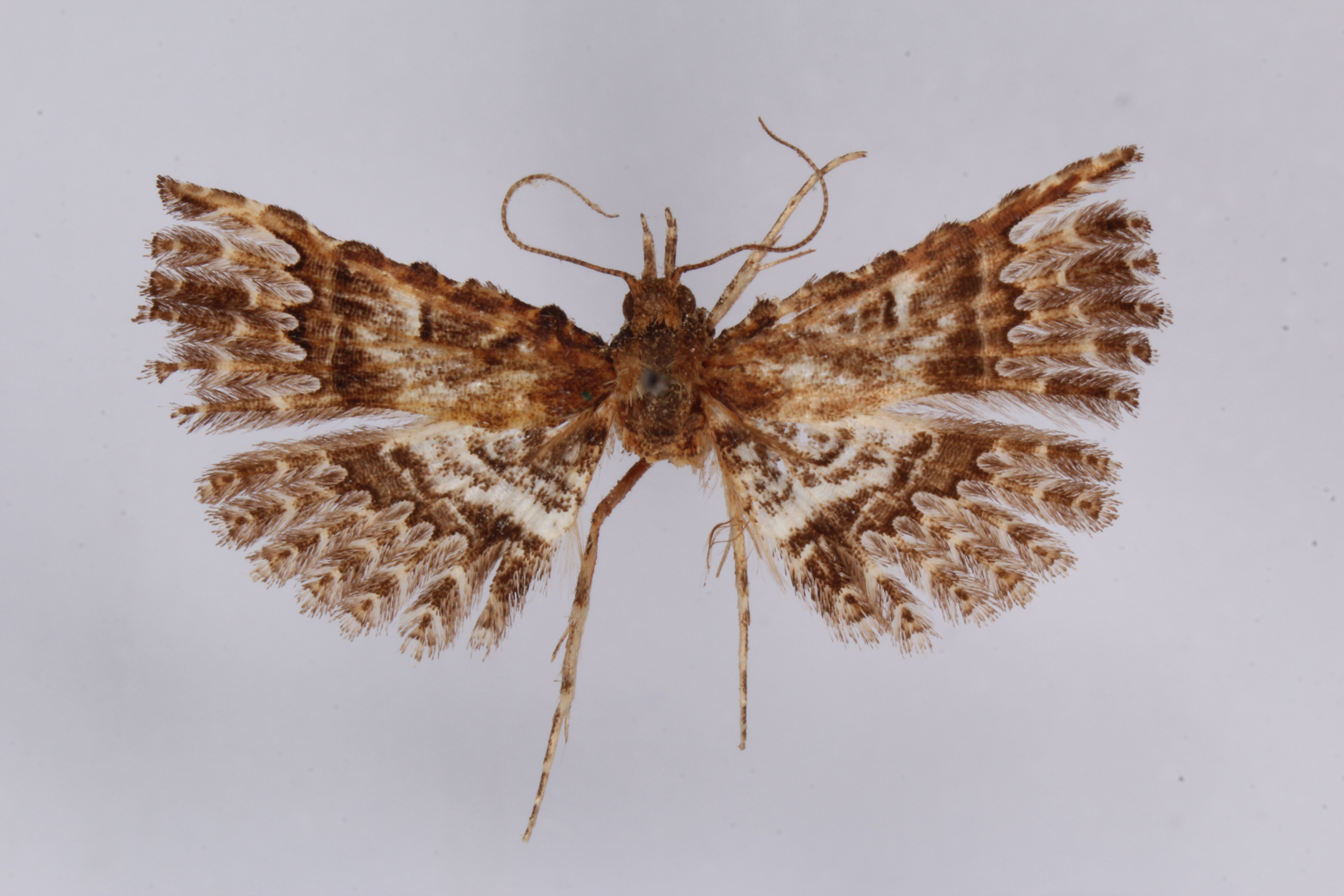
Triscaedecia dactyloptera

=== Autostichidae ===
- Encrasima elaeopis Meyrick, 1916
- Encrasima reversa Meyrick, 1916
- Encrasima xanthoclista Meyrick, 1923
- Nephantis serinopa Meyrick, 1905
- Oegoconia praeramis Meyrick, 1918
- Stereosticha pilulata Meyrick, 1913

=== Batrachedridae ===
- Batrachedra arenosella (Walker, 1864)
- Batrachedra aphypnota (Meyrick, 1917)
- Batrachedra macroloncha Meyrick, 1916
- Batrachedra scapulata Meyrick, 1916
- Batrachedra substrata Meyrick, 1916
- Batrachedra verax Meyrick, 1916
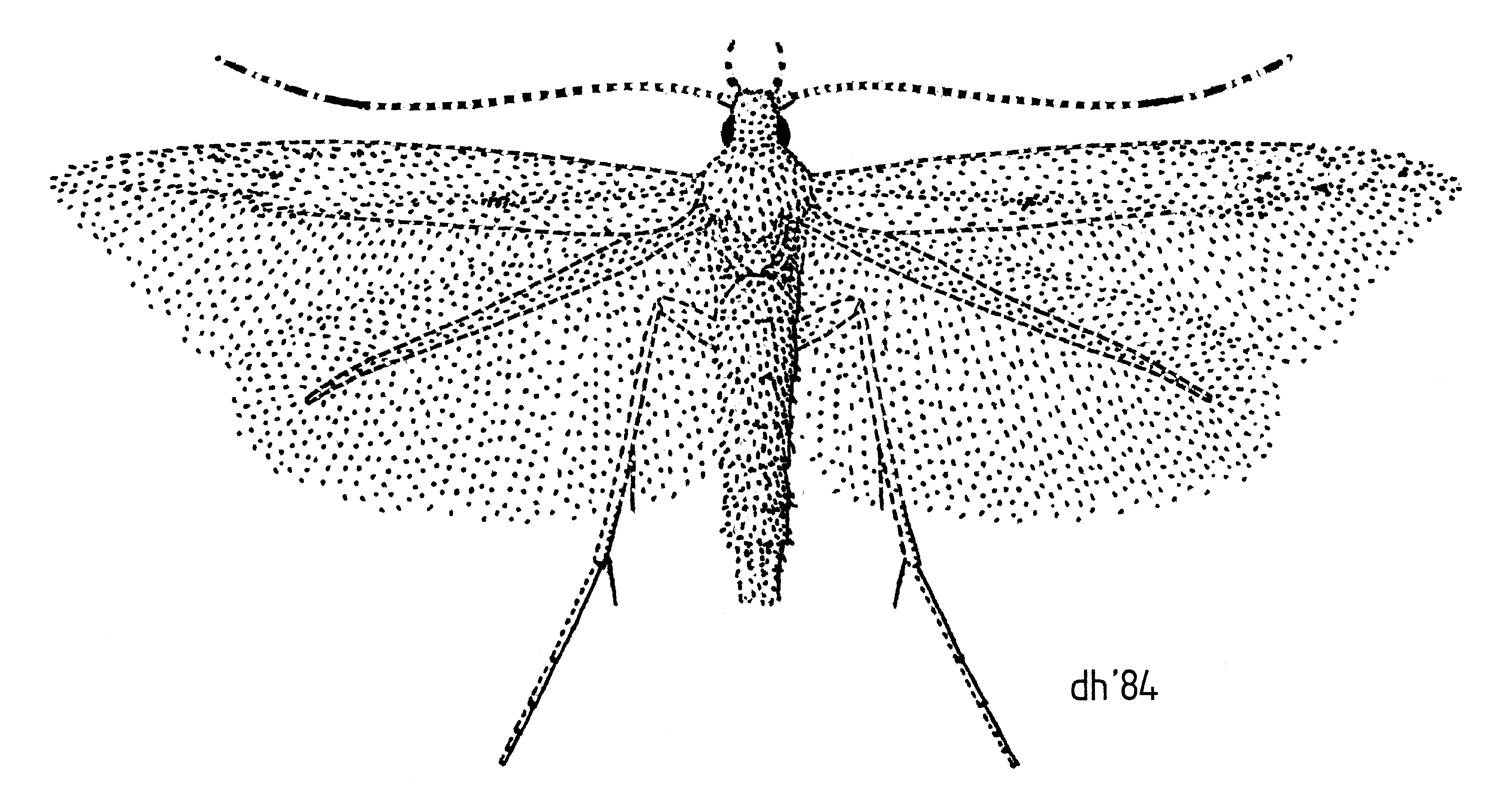
Batrachedra arenosella

=== Blastobasidae ===
- Syncola epaphria Meyrick, 1916

=== Bombycidae ===
- Gunda ochracea Walker, 1862
- Gunda thwaitesii (Moore, 1883)
- Trilocha varians (Walker, 1855)
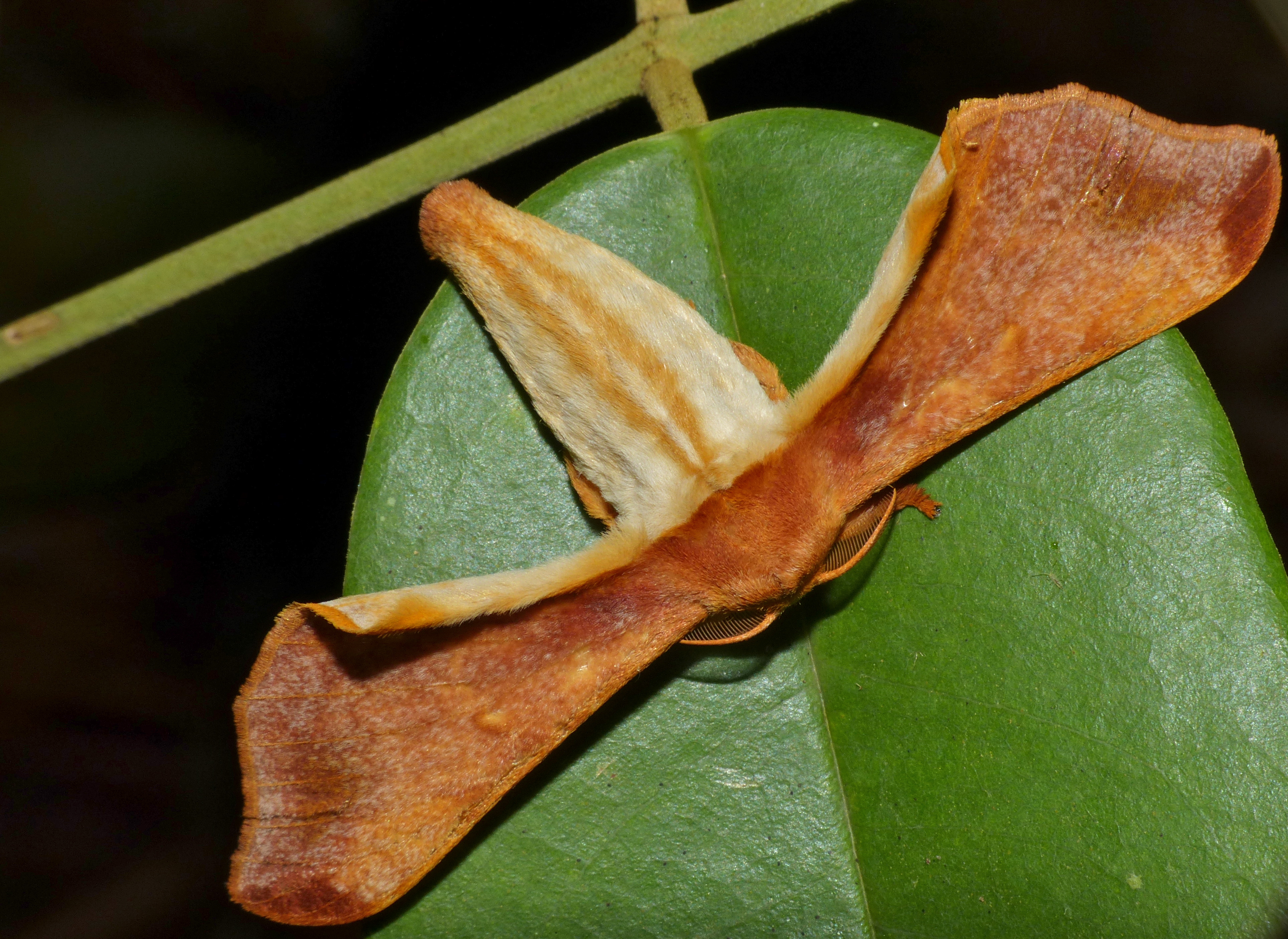
Gunda ochracea female

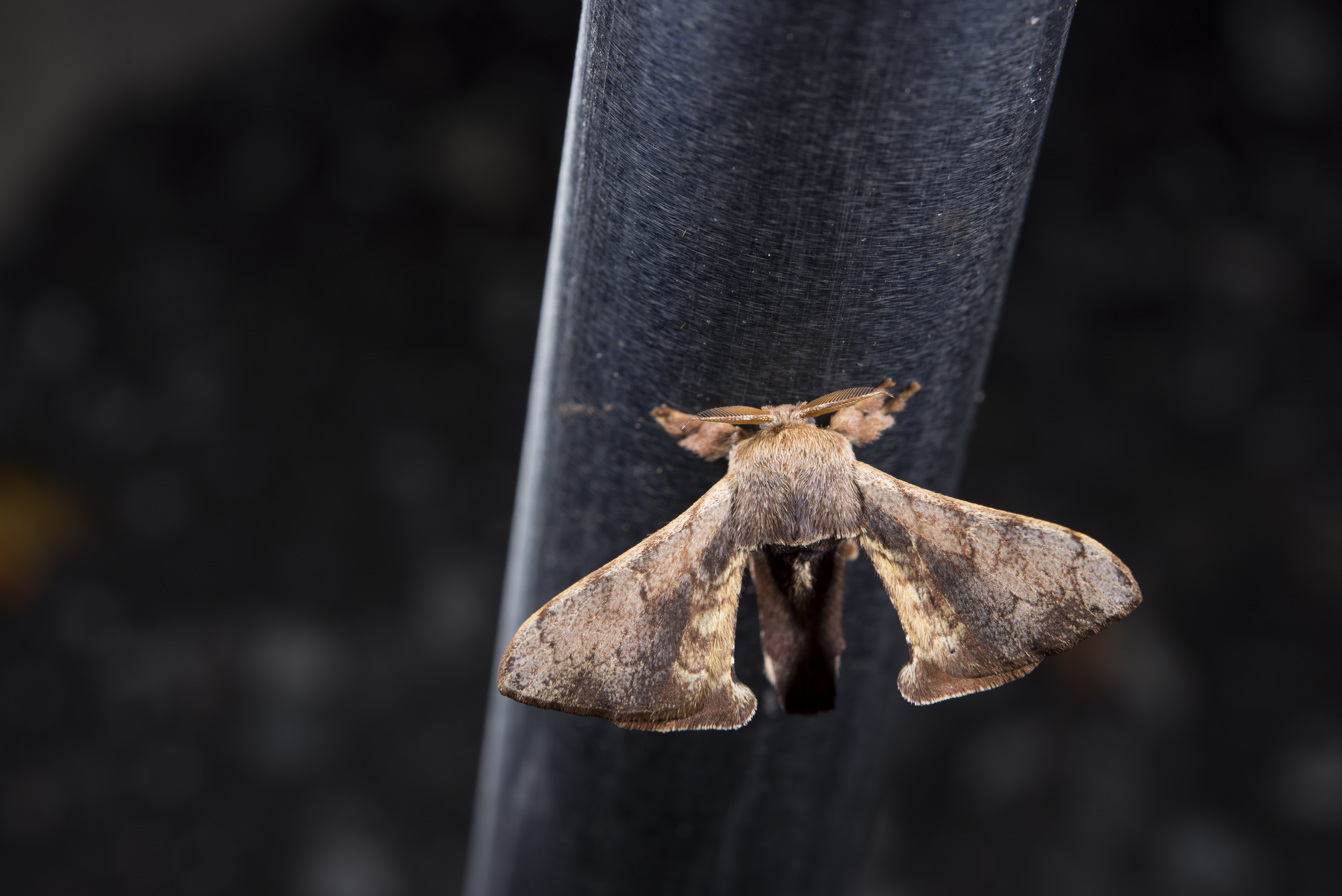
Trilocha varians

=== Brachodidae - little bear moths ===
- Nigilgia adjectella Walker, 1863
- Nigilgia anactis Diakonoff, 1982
- Phycodes chionardis Meyrick, 1909
- Phycodes minor Moore, 1881
- Phycodes radiata (Ochsenheimer, 1808)
- Phycodes taonopa Meyrick, 1909
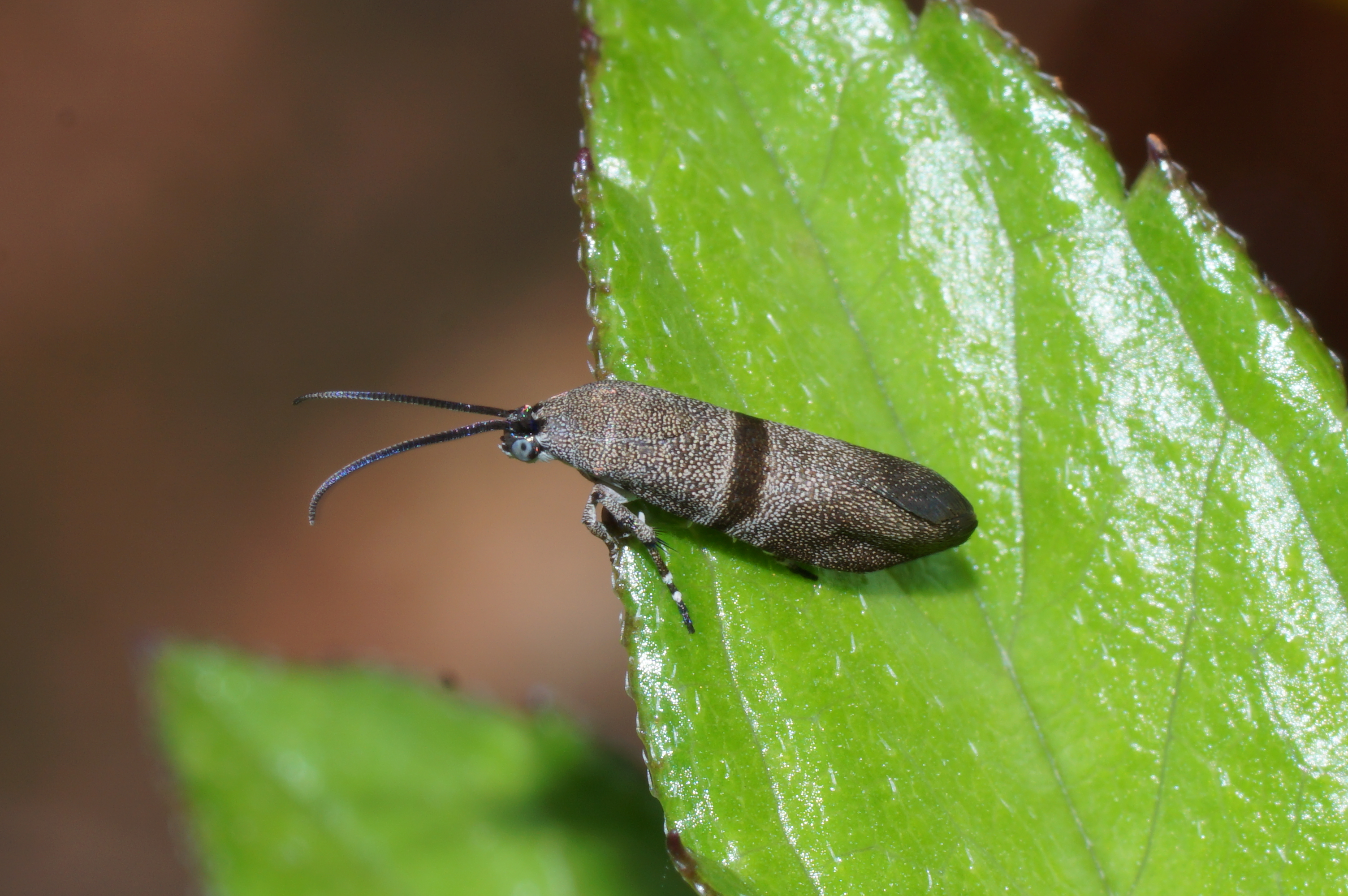
Phycodes minor

=== Callidulidae - day-flying moths ===
- Tetragonus catamitus Geyer, 1832
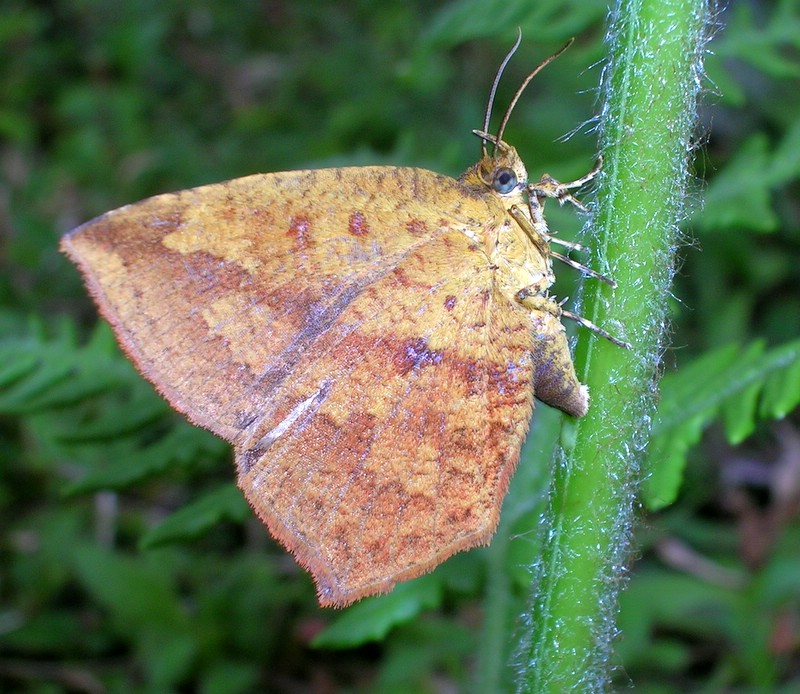
Tetragonus catamitus

=== Carposinidae ===
- Paramorpha aulata (Meyrick)
- Nosphidia paradoxa Diakonoff, 1982
- Metacosmesis aelinopa Diakonoff, 1982
- Metacosmesis laxeuta (Meyrick, 1906)

=== Choreutidae - metalmark moths ===
- Brenthia buthusalis (Walker, 1863)
- Brenthia catenata Meyrick, 1907
- Brenthia cyanaula Meyrick, 1912
- Brenthia entoma Diakonoff, 1982
- Brenthia thoracosema Diakonoff, 1982
- Choreutis achyrodes (Meyrick, 1912)
- Choreutis euclista (Meyrick, 1918)
- Choreutis ialeura (Meyrick, 1912)
- Choreutis orthogona (Meyrick, 1886)
- Choreutis ophiosema (Lower, 1896)
- Choreutis psilachyra (Meyrick, 1912)
- Choreutis sexfasciella (Sauber, 1902)
- Choreutis taprobanes (Zeller, 1877)
- Prochoreutis sehestediana (Fabricius, 1777)
- Saptha smaragditis Meyrick, 1905
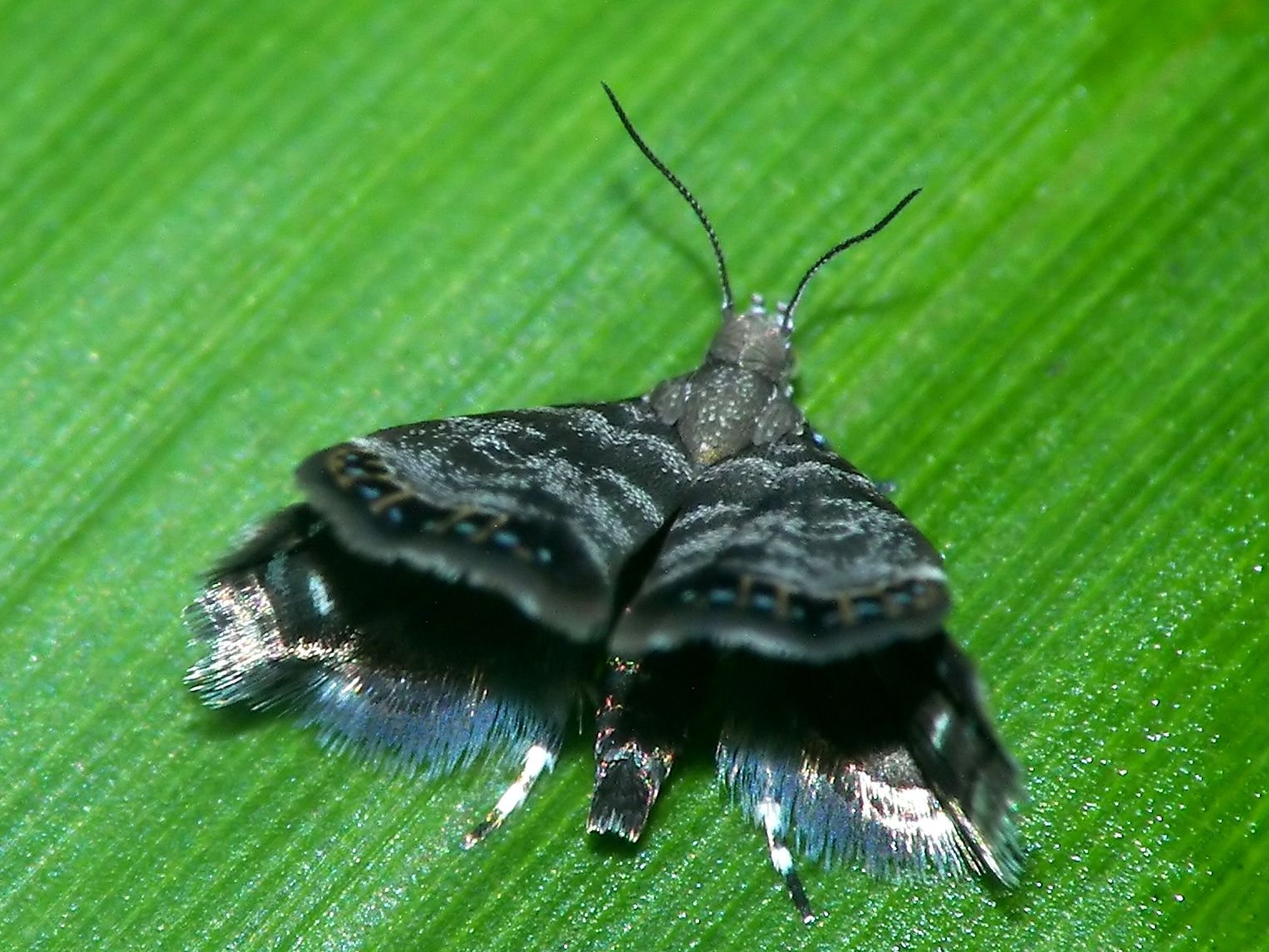
Brenthia catenata

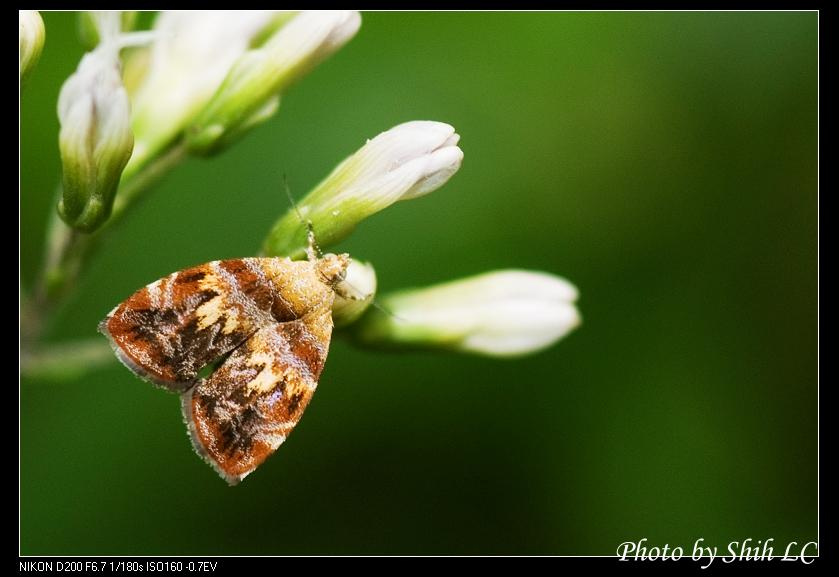
Choreutis sexfasciella

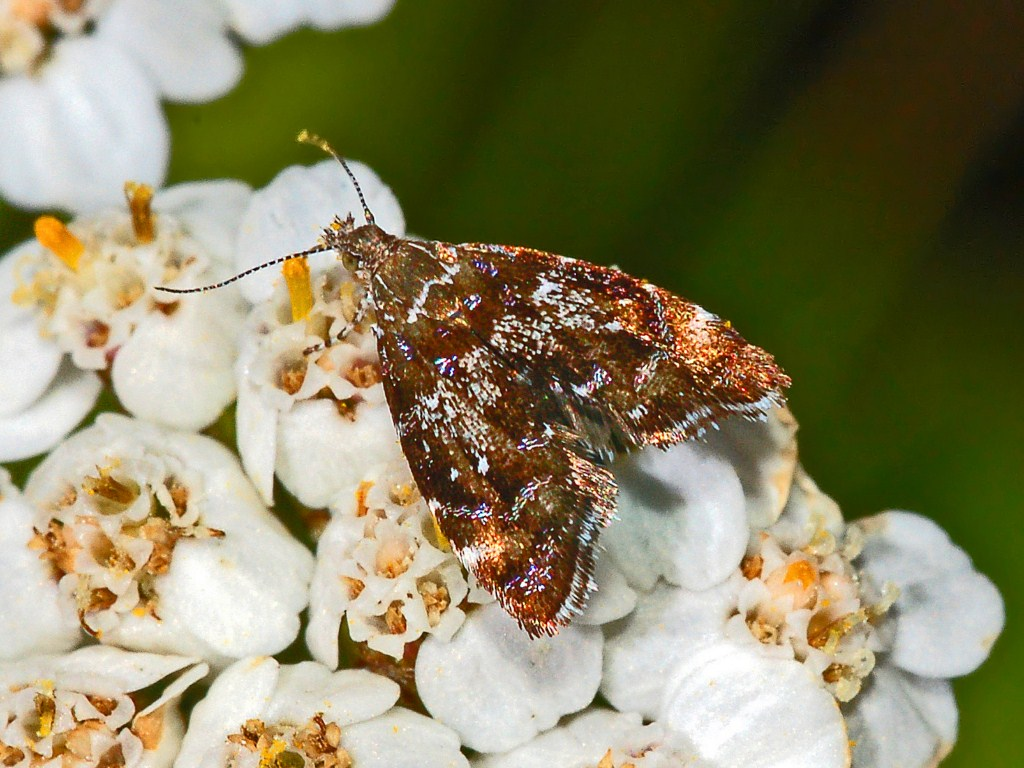
Prochoreutis sehestediana

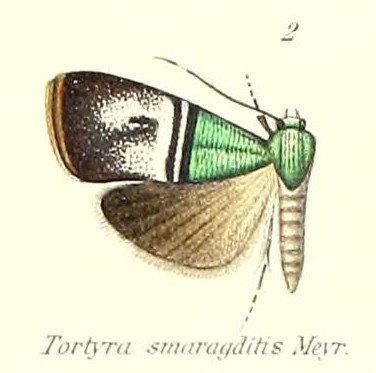
Saptha smaragditis

=== Coleophoridae ===
- Coleophora crypsiphanes Meyrick, 1917

=== Copromorphidae ===
- Copromorpha pleurophanes Meyrick 1905

=== Cosmopterigidae - cosmet moths ===
- Allotalanta globulosa Meyrick, 1914
- Anatrachyntis amphisaris (Meyrick, 1922)
- Anatrachyntis centrophanes Meyrick, 1915
- Anatrachyntis falcatella (Stainton, 1859)
- Anatrachyntis mythologica (Meyrick, 1917)
- Archisopha foliosa Meyrick, 1918
- Ascalenia thoracista (Meyrick, 1915)
- Cosmopterix aculeata Meyrick, 1909
- Cosmopterix artifica Meyrick, 1909
- Cosmopterix basilisca Meyrick, 1909
- Cosmopterix catharacma Meyrick, 1909
- Cosmopterix hamifera Meyrick, 1909
- Cosmopterix panopla Meyrick, 1909
- Cosmopterix spiculata Meyrick, 1909
- Cyphothyris ophryodes Meyrick, 1914
- Homosaces anthocoma Meyrick, 1894
- Isorrhoa triloxias Meyrick, 1907
- Labdia arachnitis (Meyrick, 1907)
- Labdia faceta Meyrick, 1912
- Labdia oxychlora Meyrick, 1932
- Labdia semicoccinea (Stainton, 1859
- Limnaecia chromaturga Meyrick, 1915)
- Limnaecia magica (Meyrick, 1905)
- Limnaecia scaeosema (Meyrick, 1905)
- Meleonoma heterota Meyrick, 1914
- Meleonoma petrota Meyrick, 1914
- Meleonoma stomota (Meyrick, 1910)
- Pyroderces anthinopa Meyrick, 1917
- Syntomaula tephrota Meurick, 1914
- Trissodoris honorariella (Walsingham, 1907)
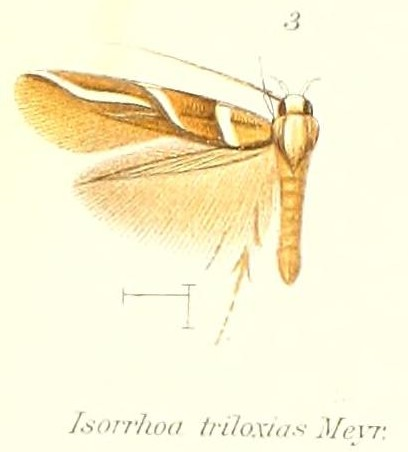
Isorrhoa triloxias

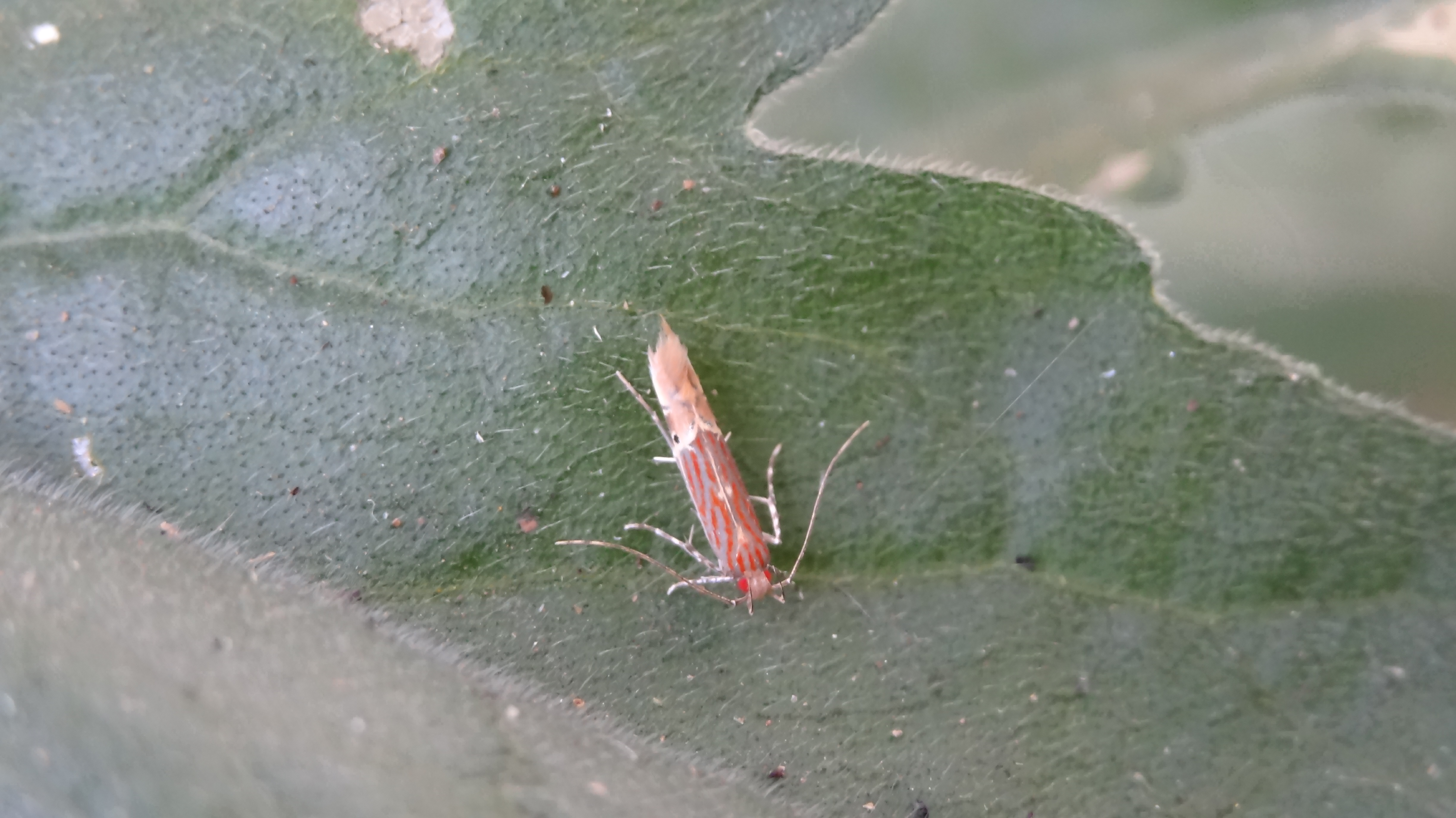
Labdia semicoccinea

=== Cossidae - carpenter millers ===
- Azygophleps scalaris (Fabricius, 1775)
- Duomitus ceramicus (Walker, 1865)
- Indarbela quadrinotata (Walker, 1856)
- Isocossus vandeldeni Roepke, 1957
- Neurozerra roricyanea Walker, 1862
- Orientozeuzera postexcisa Hampson, 1893
- Phragmataecia castaneae (Hübner, 1790)
- Phragmataecia impura Hampson, 1891
- Phragmataecia parvipuncta (Hampson, 1892)
- Polyphagozerra coffeae Nietner, 1861
- Rugigegat nigra (Moore, 1877)
- Xyleutes persona Le Guillou, 1841
- Zeuzera pyrina (Linnaeus, 1761)
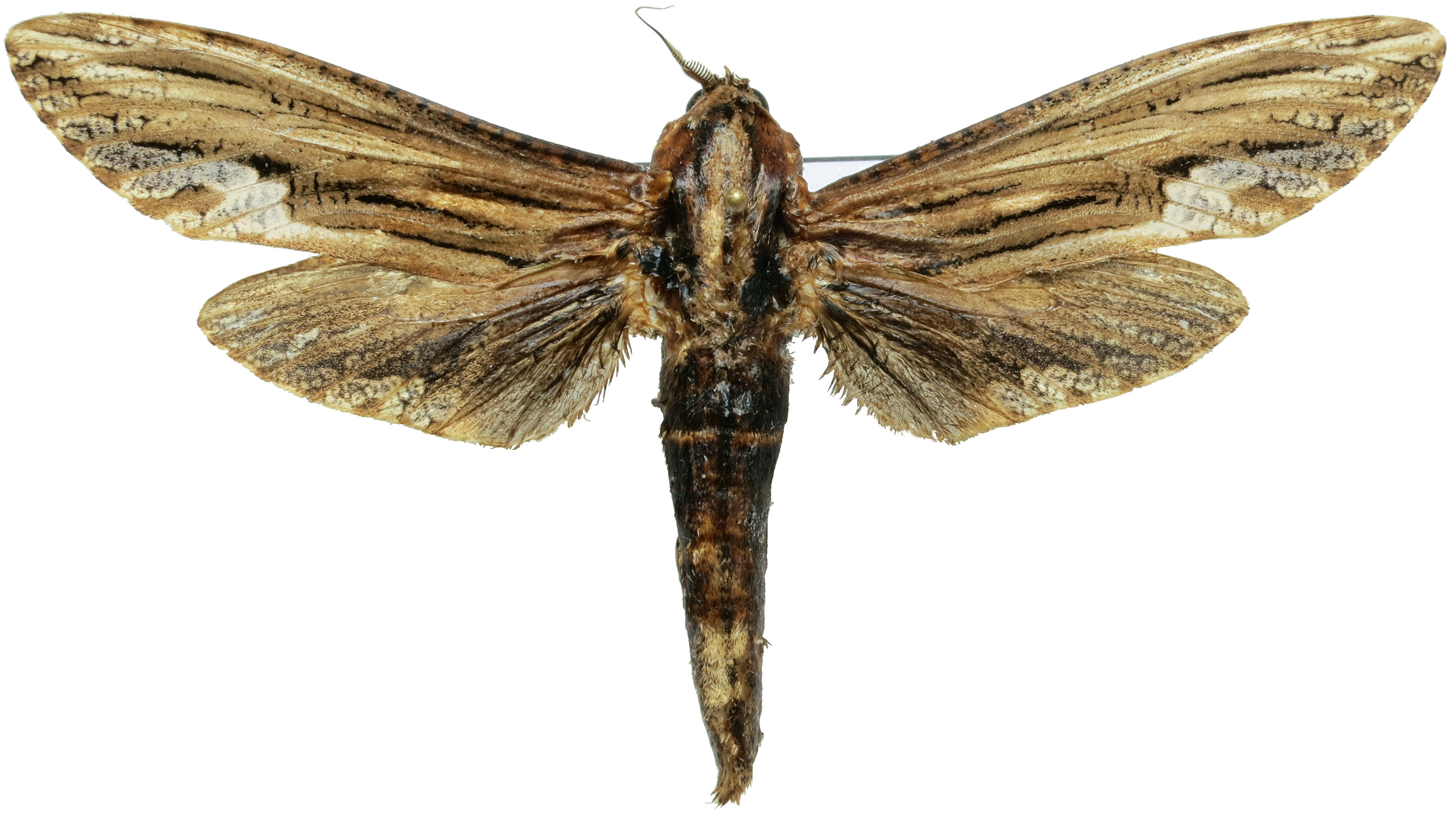
Duomitus ceramicus

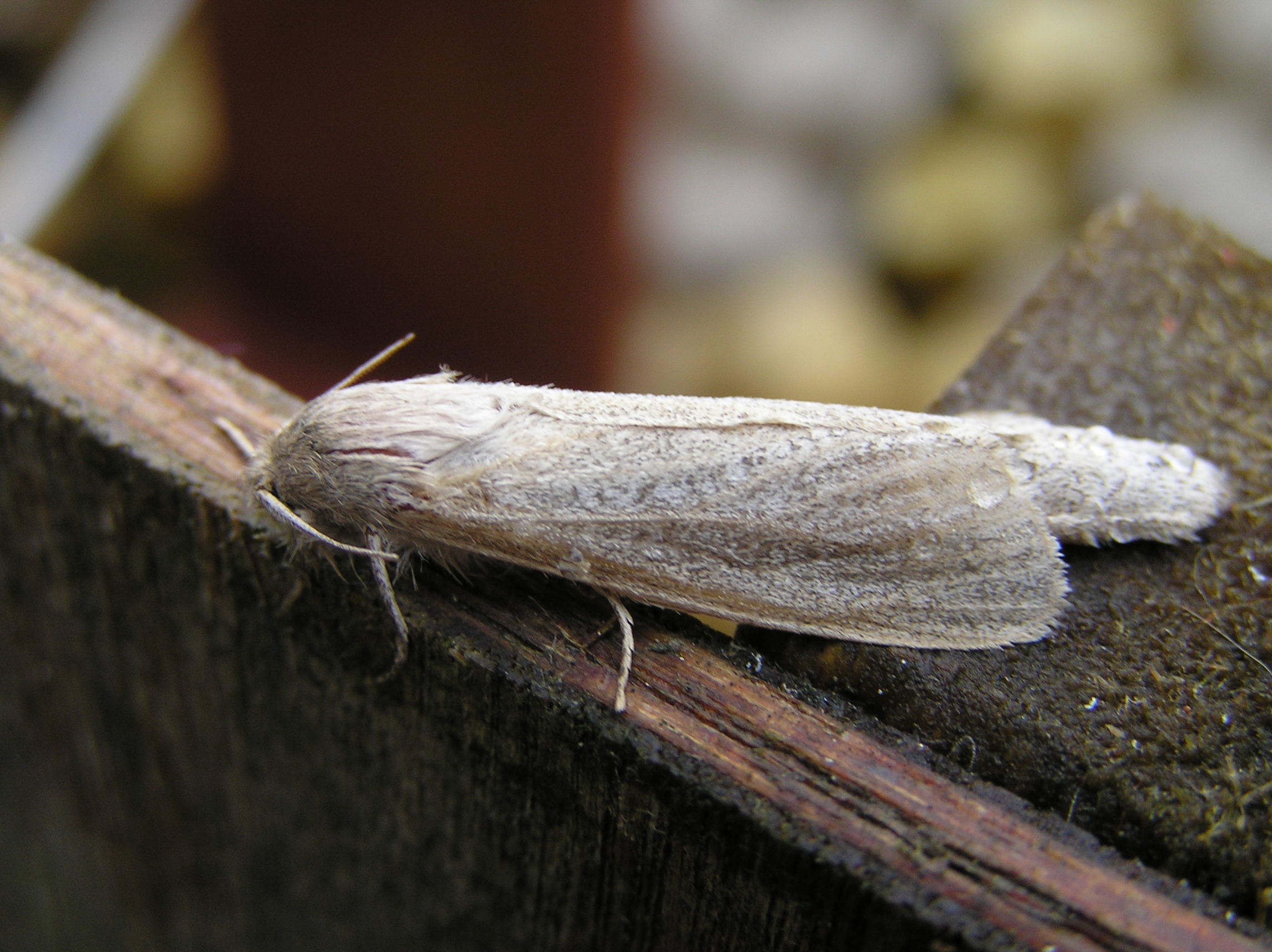
Phragmataecia castaneae

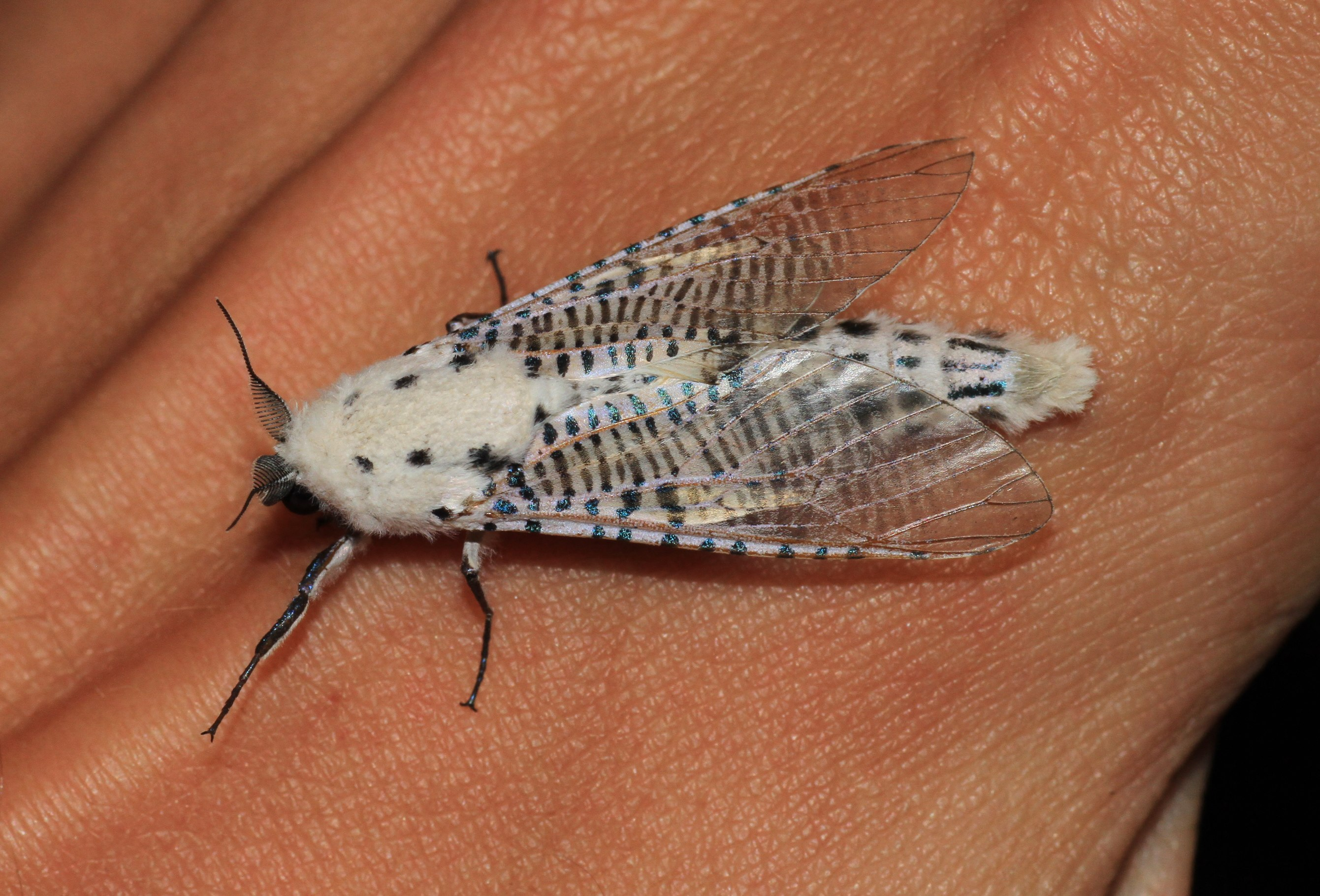
Polyphagozerra coffeae

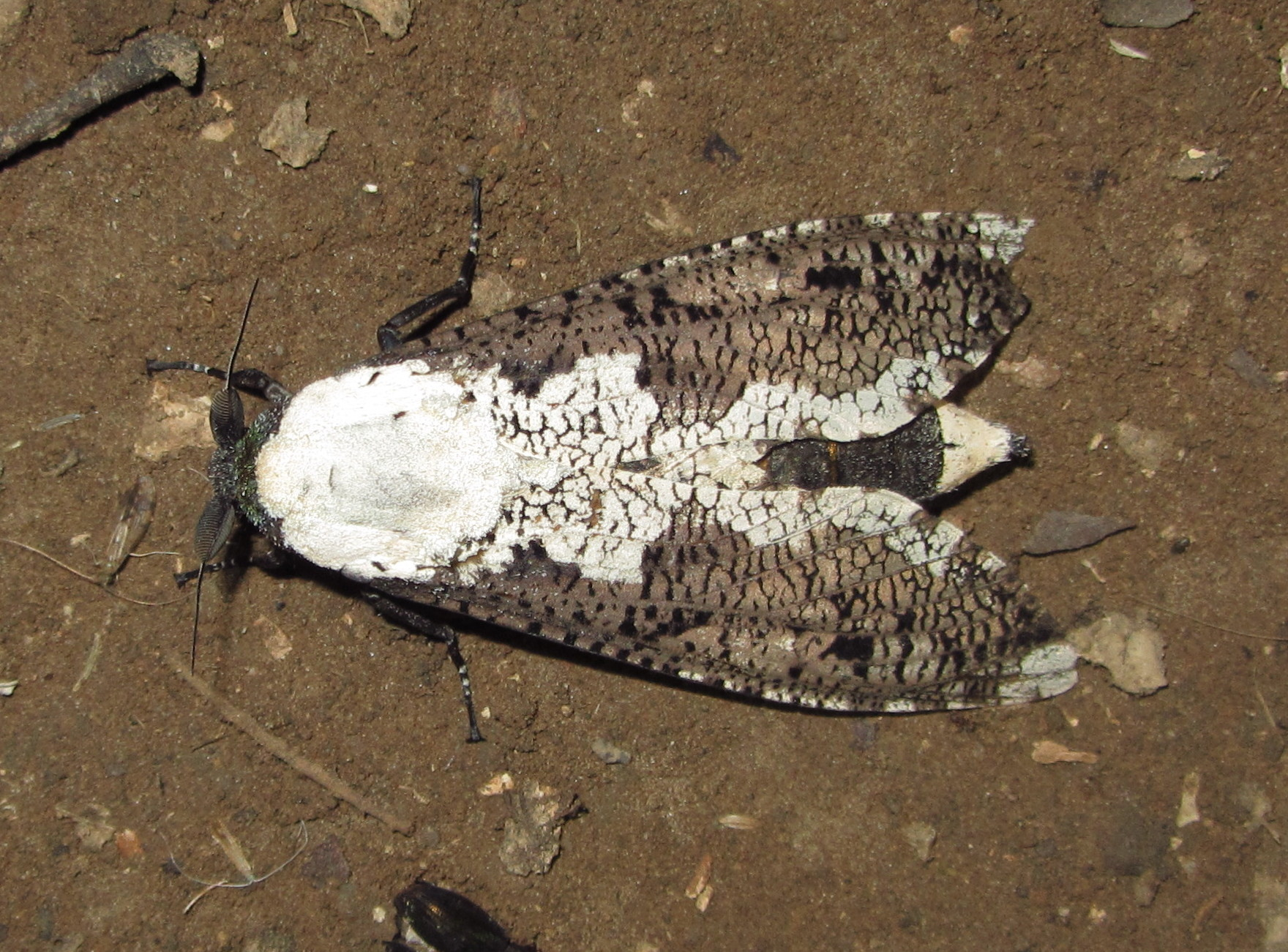
Xyleutes persona

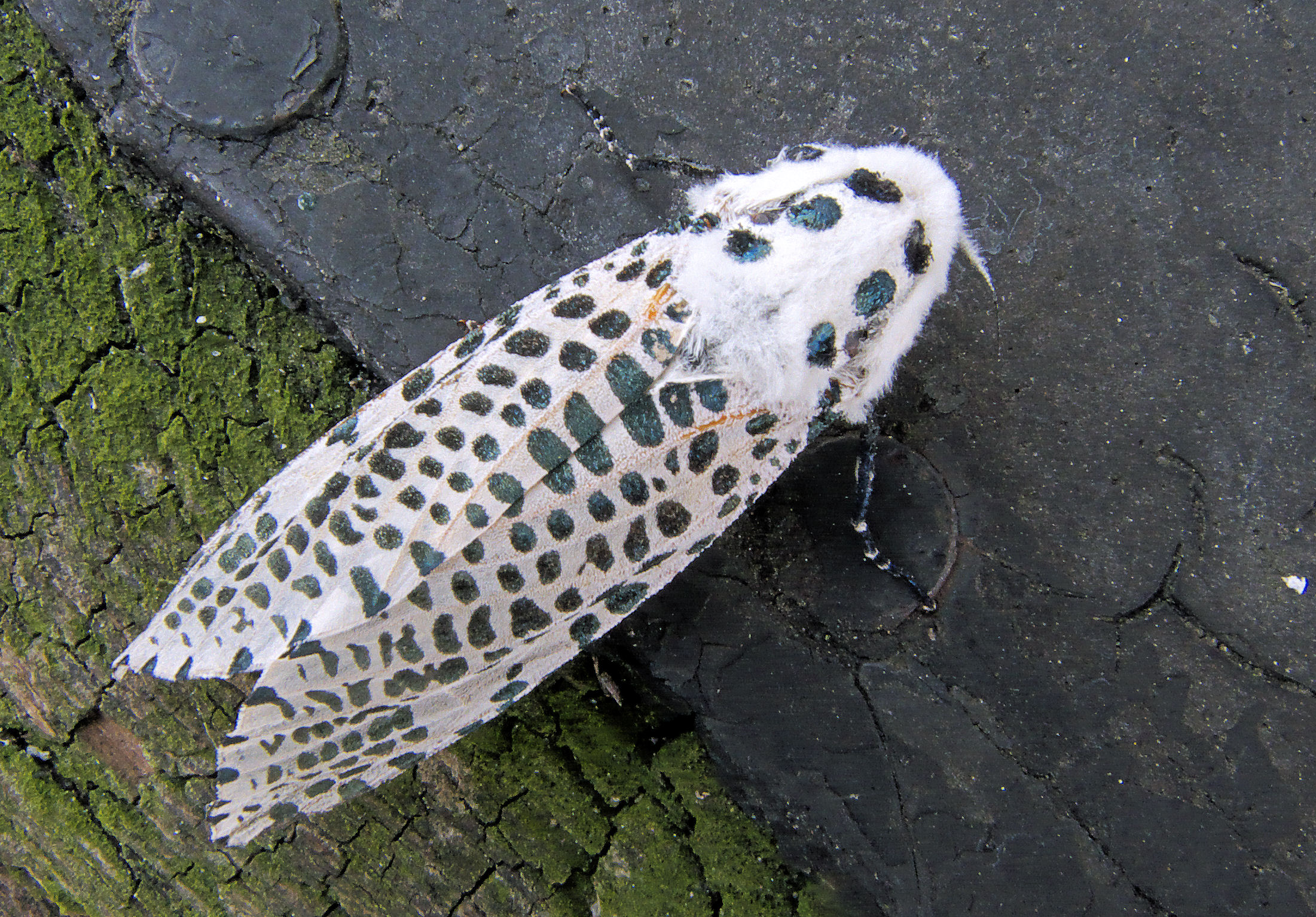
Zeuzera pyrina

=== Crambidae ===
- Hemiscopis suffusalis (Walker 1866 [1865])
- Hydrorybina polusalis (Walker 1859)

==== Acentropinae ====
- Agassiziella alicialis (Hampson, 1906
- Agassiziella angulipennis (Hampson, 1891)
- Agassiziella dianale (Hampson, 1893)
- Agassiziella fuscifusalis (Hampson, 1893)
- Agassiziella niveinotatum (Hampson, 1893)
- Agassiziella picalis (Guenée, 1854)
- Ambia iambealis (Walker, 1859)
- Ambia tenebrosalis Hampson, 1896
- Ambia xantholeuca Hampson, 1896
- Cataclysta angulata Moore, 1885
- Dodanga cristata Hampson, 1891
- Elophila melagynalis (Agassiz, 1978)
- Elophila responsalis (Walker, 1866)
- Eoophyla sejunctalis (Snelloen, 1876)
- Eristena ornata (Moore, 1885)
- Eristena postalbalis (Hampson, 1893)
- Eristena araealis (Hampson, 1897)
- Eristena pulchellale (Hampson, 1893)
- Eristena melanotalis (Hampson, 1906)
- Eristena fumibasale (Hampson, 1896)
- Nymphicula blandialis (Walker, 1859)
- Nymphicula nigritalis (Hampson, 1893)
- Nymphula grisealis Hampson, 1912
- Opisthedeicta poritialis (Walker, 1859)
- Paracataclysta fuscalis Hampson, 1893
- Parapoynx crisonalis (Walker, 1859)
- Parapoynx fluctuosalis Guenée, 1854
- Parapoynx votalis (Walker, 1859)
- Parapoynx stagnalis = Nymphula depunctalis (Zeller, 1852)
- Symphonia multipictalis Hampson, 1896
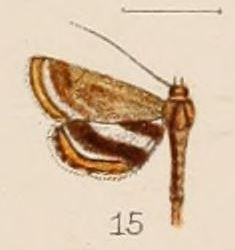
Agassiziella alicialis

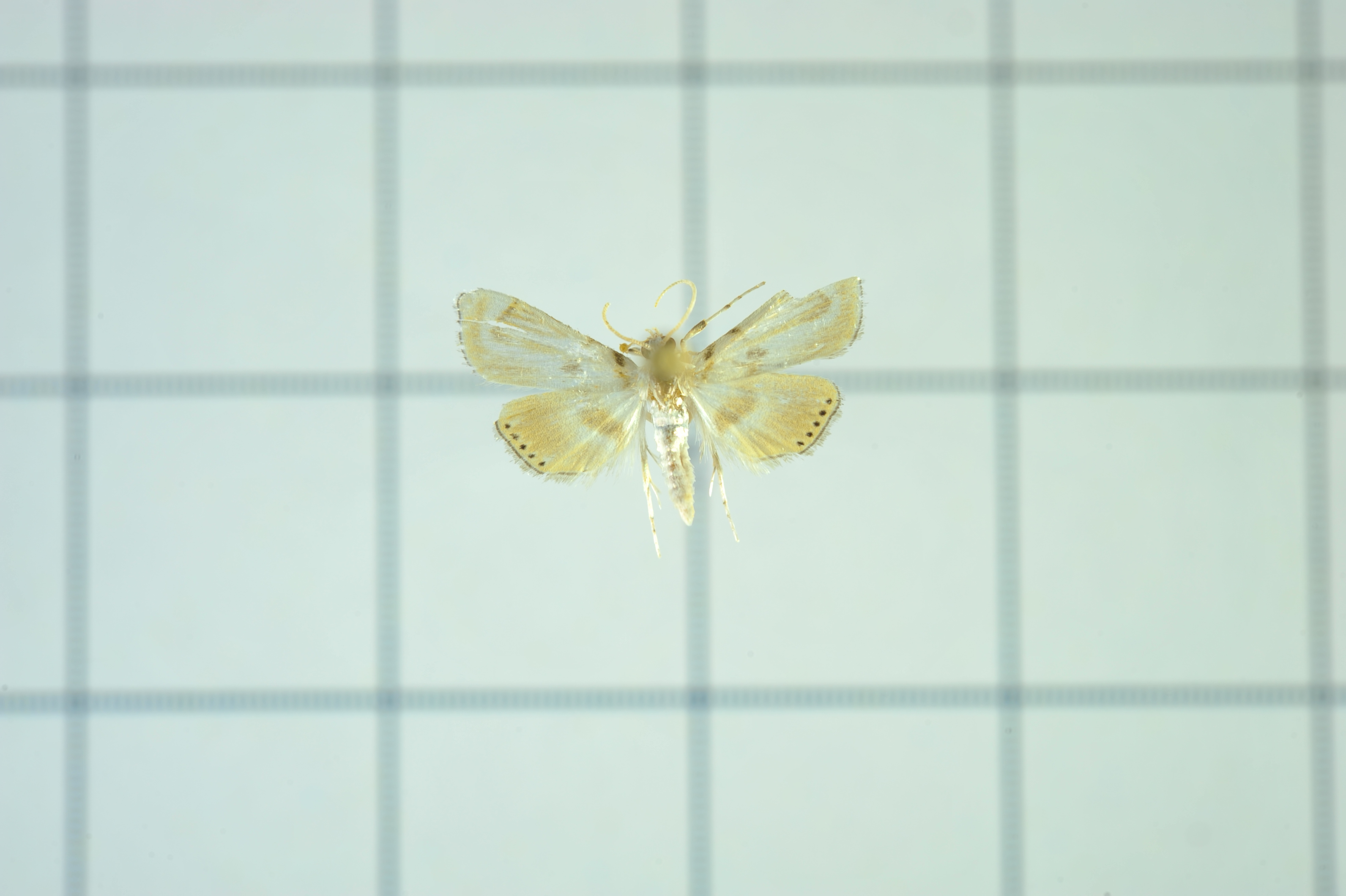
Cataclysta angulata

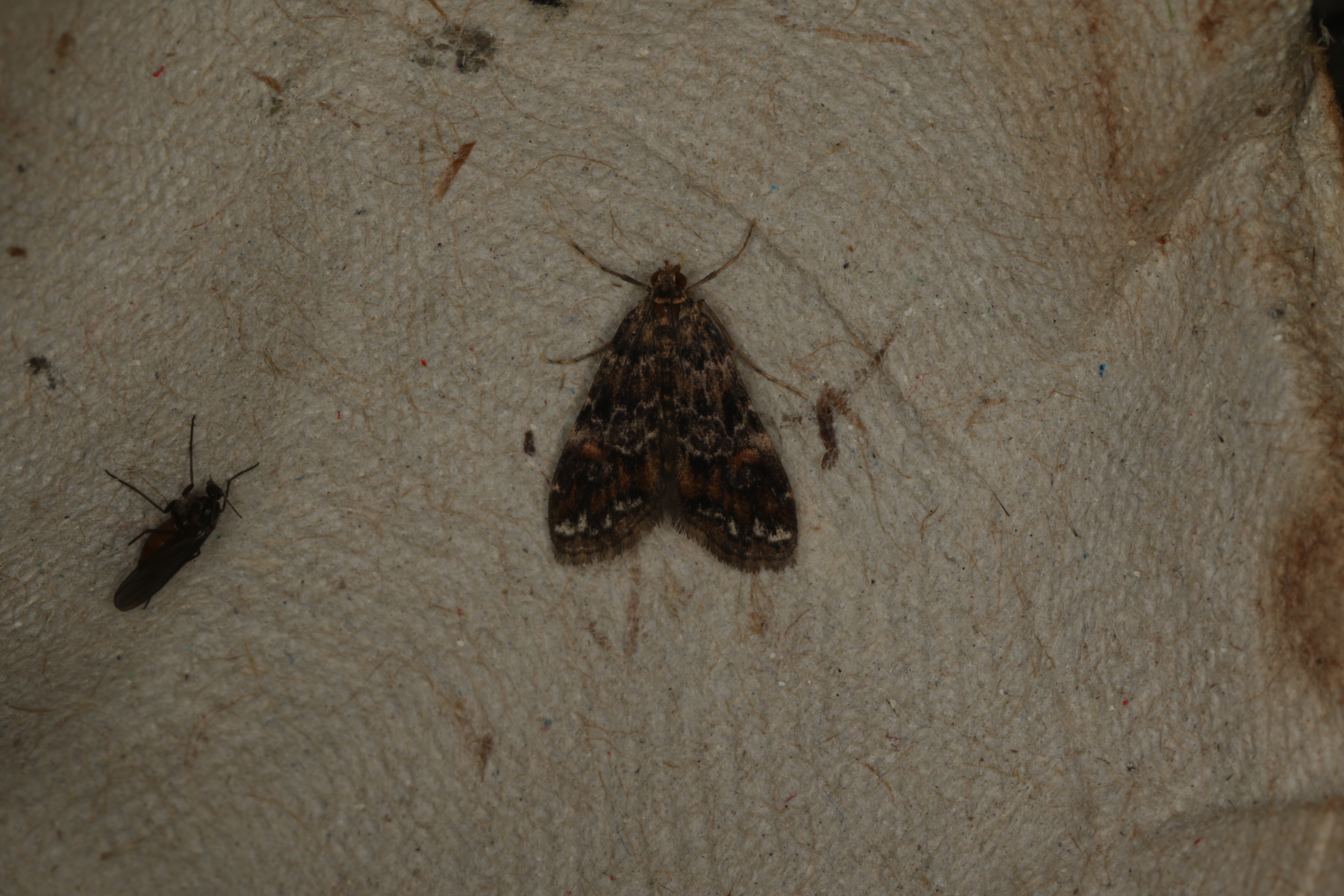
Elophila responsalis

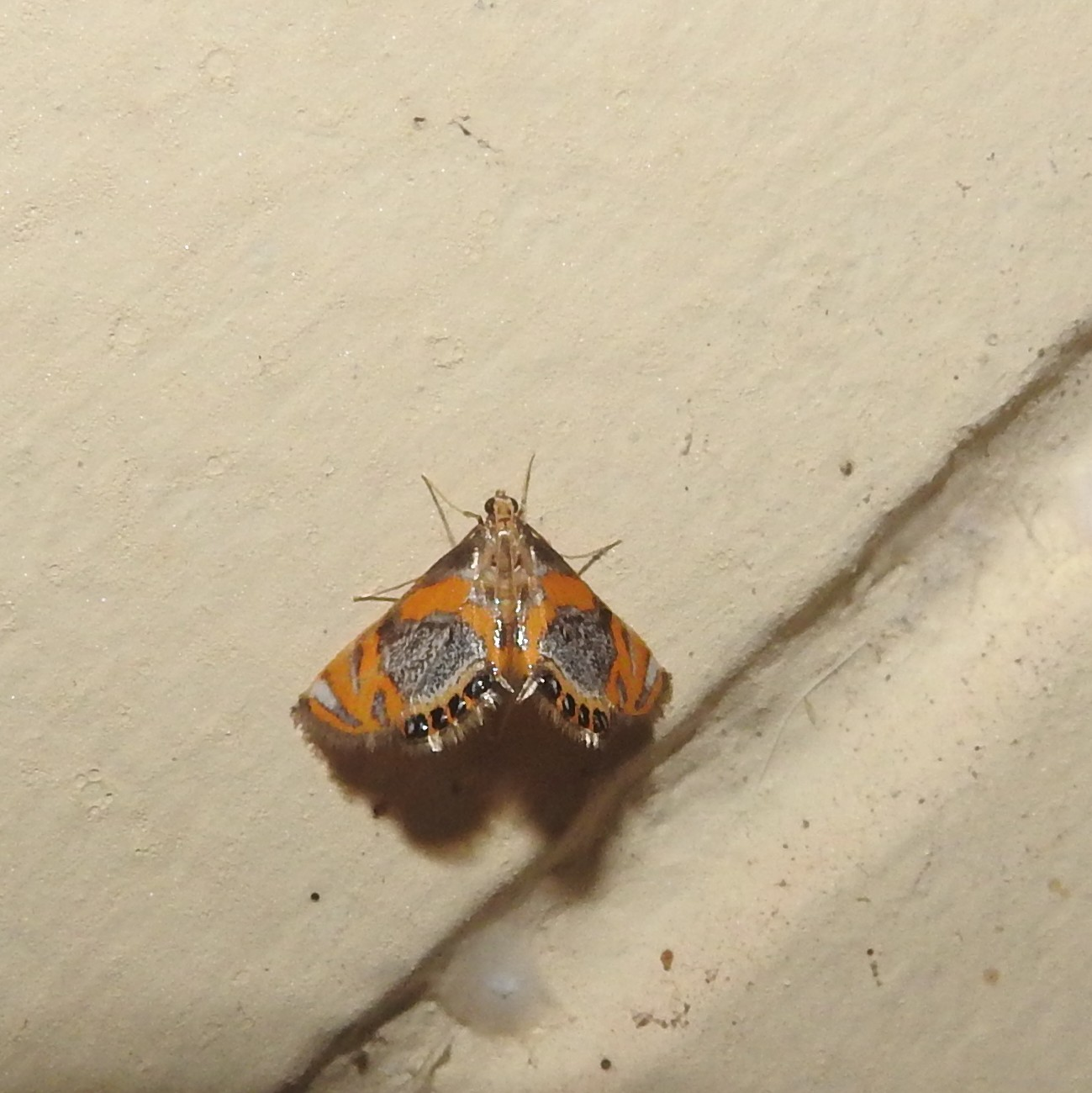
Nymphicula blandialis

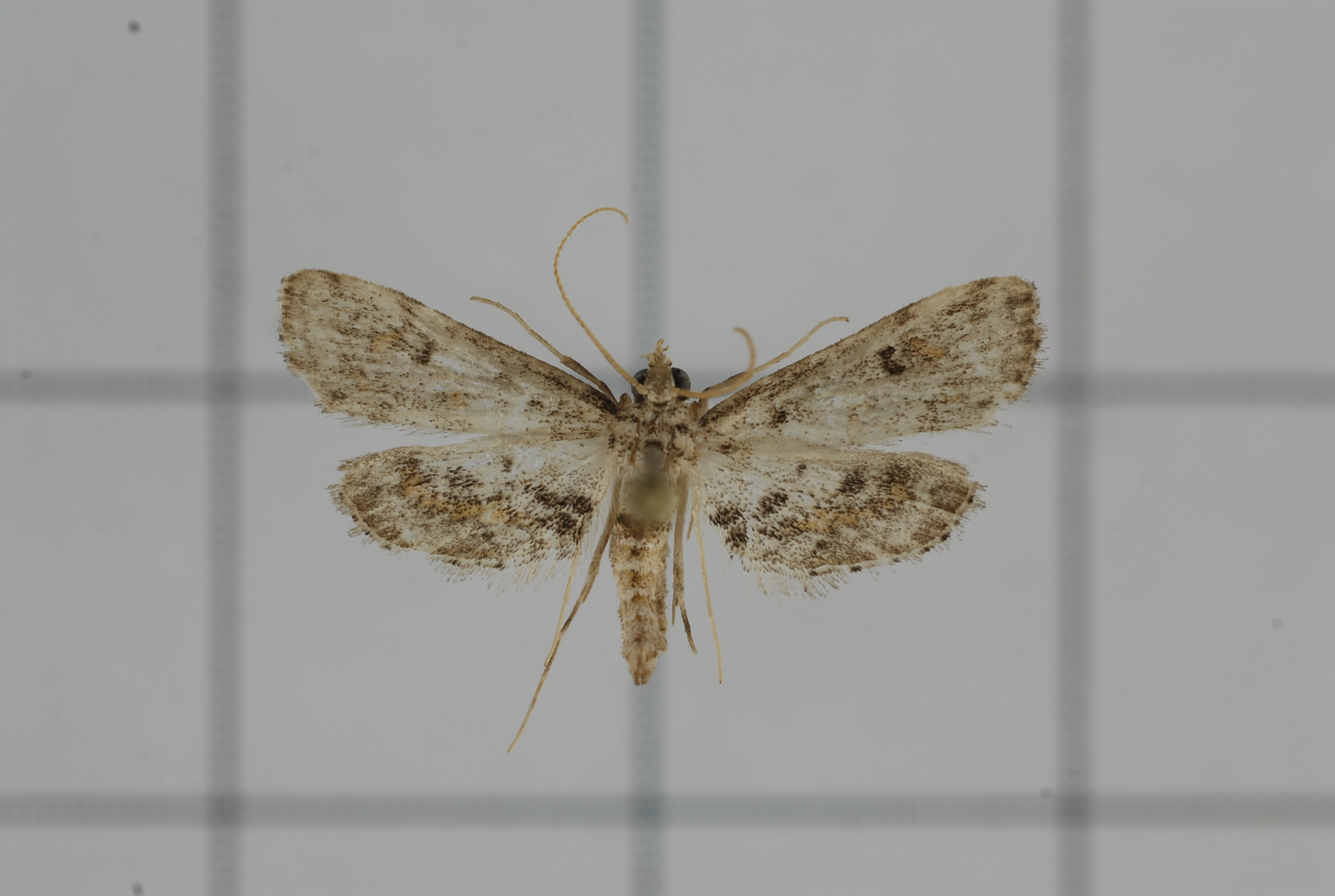
Parapoynx crisonalis

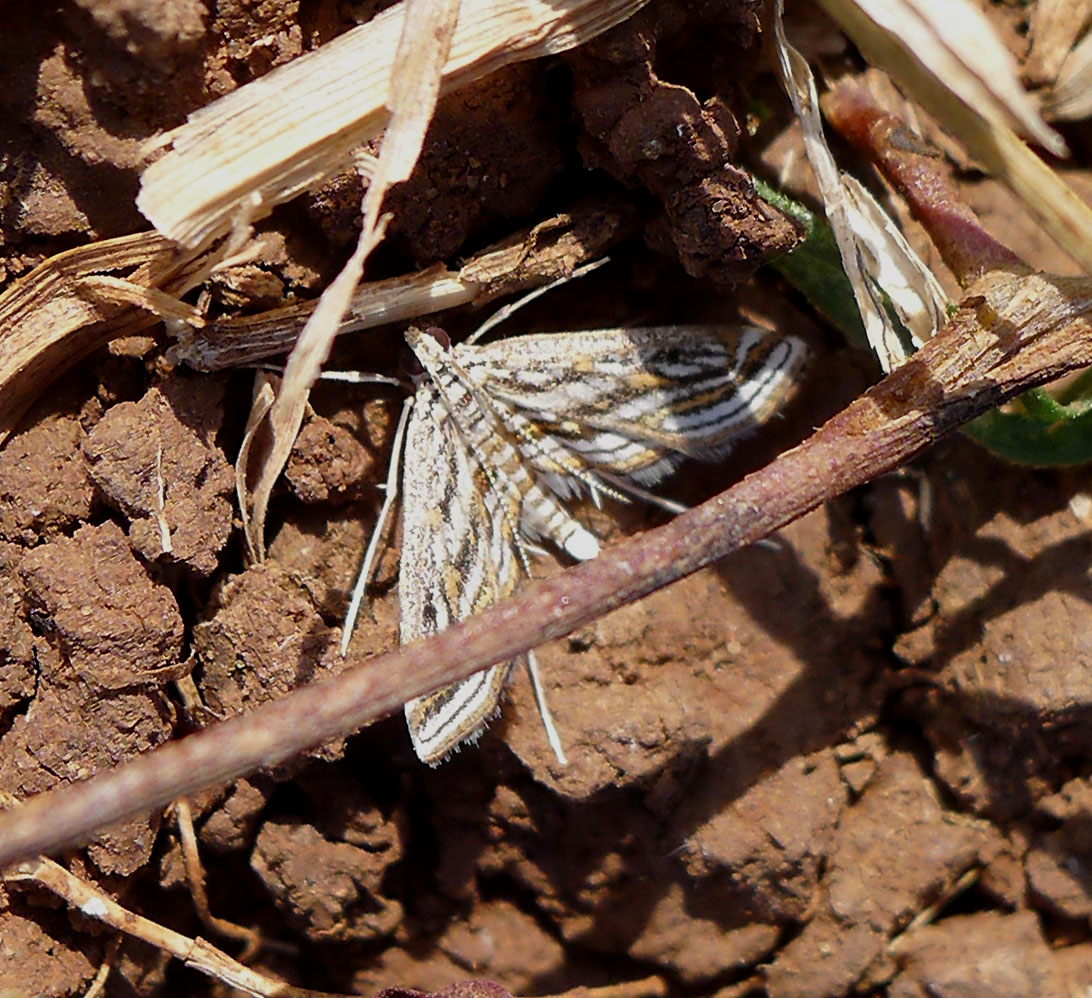
Parapoynx fluctuosalis

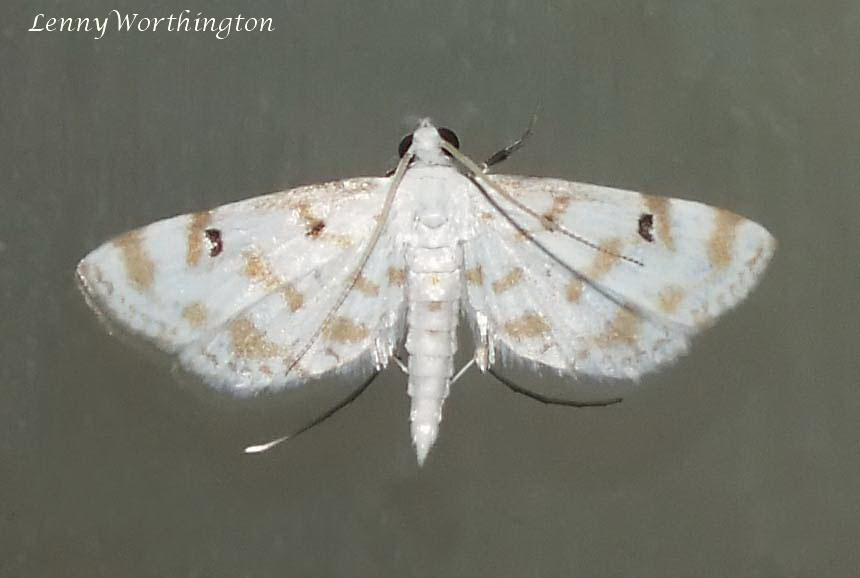
Parapoynx stagnalis

==== Crambinae ====
- Ancylolomia argentata Moore, 1885
- Ancylolomia bitubirosella Amsel, 1959
- Ancylolomia cervicella Błeszyński, 1970
- Ancylolomia chrysographellus (Kollar & Redtenbacher, 1844)
- Ancylolomia indica C. Felder, R. Felder & Rogenhofer, 1875
- Ancylolomia locupletellus (Kollar & Redtenbacher, 1844)
- Ancylolomia shefferialis Rougeot, 1984
- Ancylolomia simplella de Joannis, 1913
- Ancylolomia taprobanensis Zeller, 1863
- Ancylolomia westwoodi Zeller, 1863
- Angustalius malacelloides (Błeszyński, 1955)
- Argyria plumbolinealis Hampson, 1896
- Arthroschista hilaralis (Walker, 1859)
- Calamotropha anticella (Walker, 1866)
- Calamotropha argenticilia (hampson, 1896)
- Calamotropha atkinsoni (Zeller, 1863)
- Calamotropha caesella (Walker, 1863)
- Calamotropha delatalis (Walker, 1863)
- Calamotropha endopolia (Hampson, 1912)
- Calamotropha indica Blesyunski, 1961
- Calamotropha melanosticta (Hampson, 1896)
- Calamotropha melli (Caradja & Meyrick, 1933)
- Calamotropha neurigrammalis (Hampson, 1912)
- Calamotropha oculalis (Snellen, 1893)
- Calamotropha pseudodielota Błeszyński, 1961
- Calamotropha punctivenellus (Hampson, 1896)
- Calamotropha schwarzi Błeszyński, 1961
- Charltona desistalis (Walker, 1863)
- Charltona fusca Hampson, 1903
- Charltona kala Swinhoe, 1886
- Charltoniada apicella (Hampson, 1896)
- Chilo auricilius Dudgeon, 1905
- Chilo ceylonica Hampson, 1896
- Chilo partellus (Swinhoe, 1885)
- Chilo suppressalis (Walker, 1860)
- Crambus dianiphalis Hampson, 1908
- Culladia admigratella (Walker, 1863)
- Eschata xanthocera Hampson, 1896
- Eschata xanthorhyncha Hampson, 1896
- Gargela renatusalis (Walker, 1859)
- Glaucocharis incisella (Błeszyński, 1970)
- Glaucocharis minutalis (Hampson, 1893)
- Glaucocharis ochrophanes (Meyrick, 1931)
- Haimbachia flavalis (Hampson, 1919)
- Haimbachia lunilinealis (Hampson, 1919)
- Haimbachia strigulalis (Hampson, 1896)
- Leucoides fuscicostalis Hampson, 1893
- Mesolia margistrigella Hampson, 1899
- Mesolia pandavella Ragonot in de Joannis & Ragonot, 1889
- Pediasia ochristrigella (Hampson, 1896)
- Pilocrocis milvinalis (Swinhoe, 1885)
- Prionapteryx scitulellus (Walker, 1866)
- Pseudocatharylla duplicellus (Hampson, 1896)
- Ptychopseustis argentisparsalis (Snellen, 1880)
- Ptychopseustis fuscivenalis (Hampson, 1896)
- Ptychopseustis plumbeolinealis (Hampson, 1896)
- Roxita adspersella Snellen, 1893
- Surattha invectalis (Walker, 1863)
- Surattha nigrifascialis (Walker, 1866)
- Thopeutis galleriellus (Ragonot, 1892)
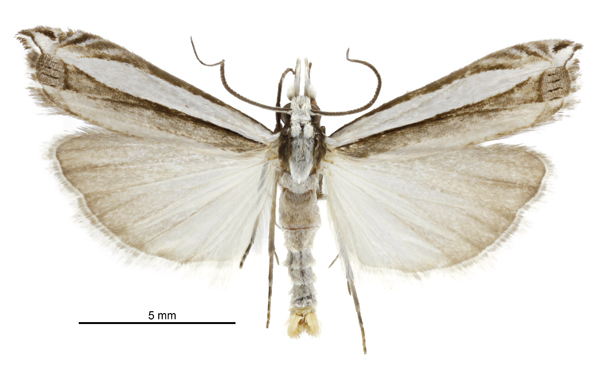
Angustalius malacelloides

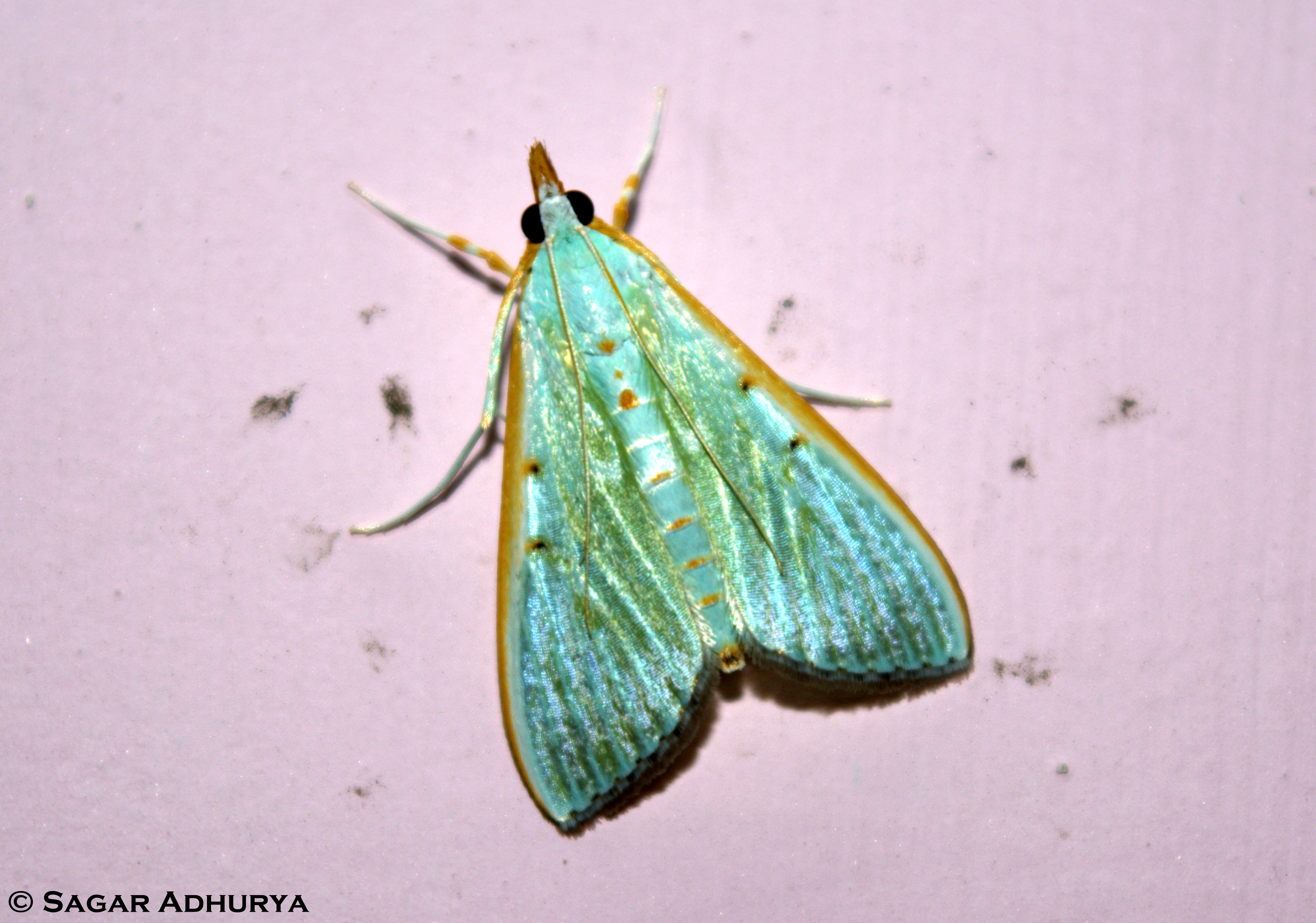
Arthroschista hilaralis

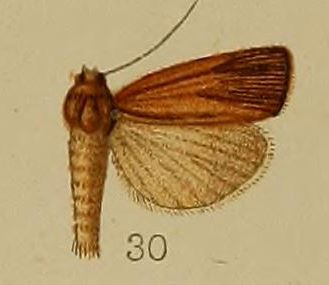
Calamotropha endopolia

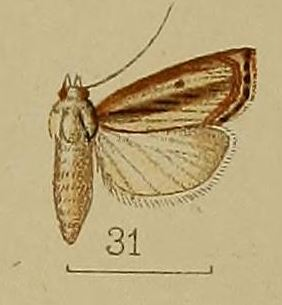
Calamotropha neurigrammalis

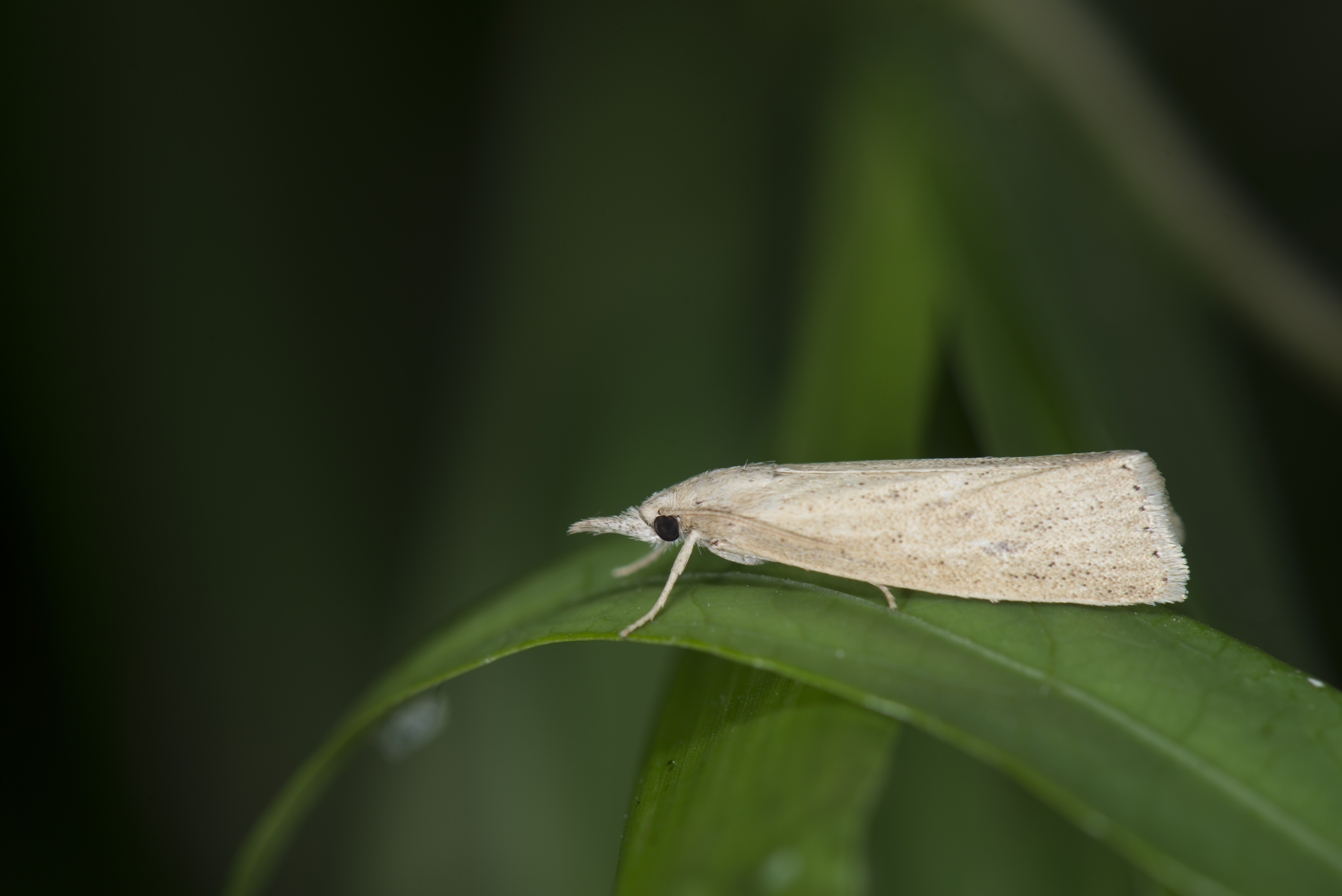
Chilo suppressalis

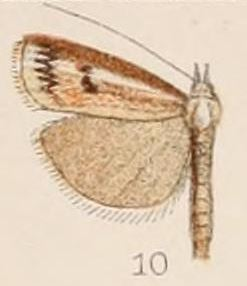
Crambus dianiphalis

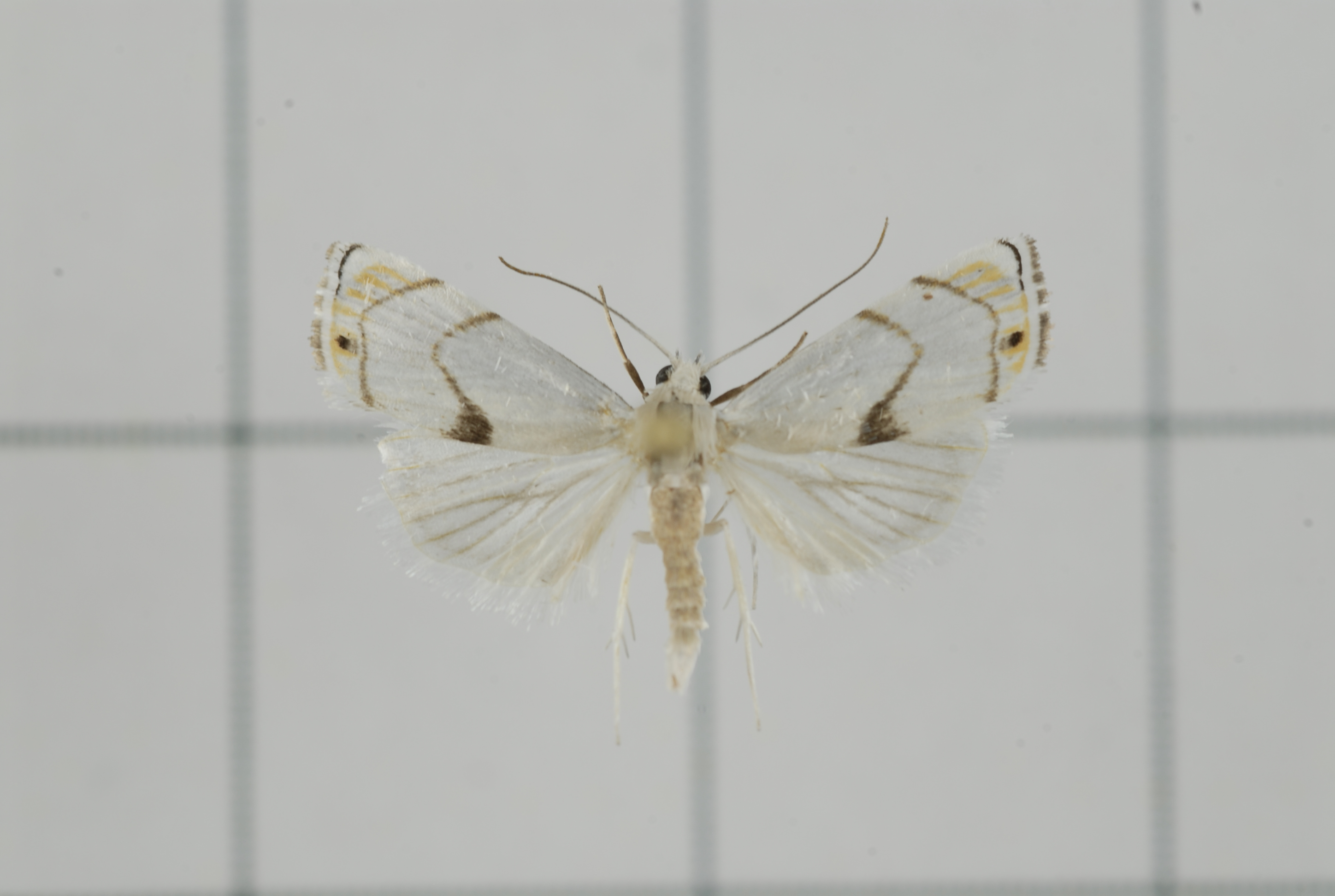
Gargela renatusalis

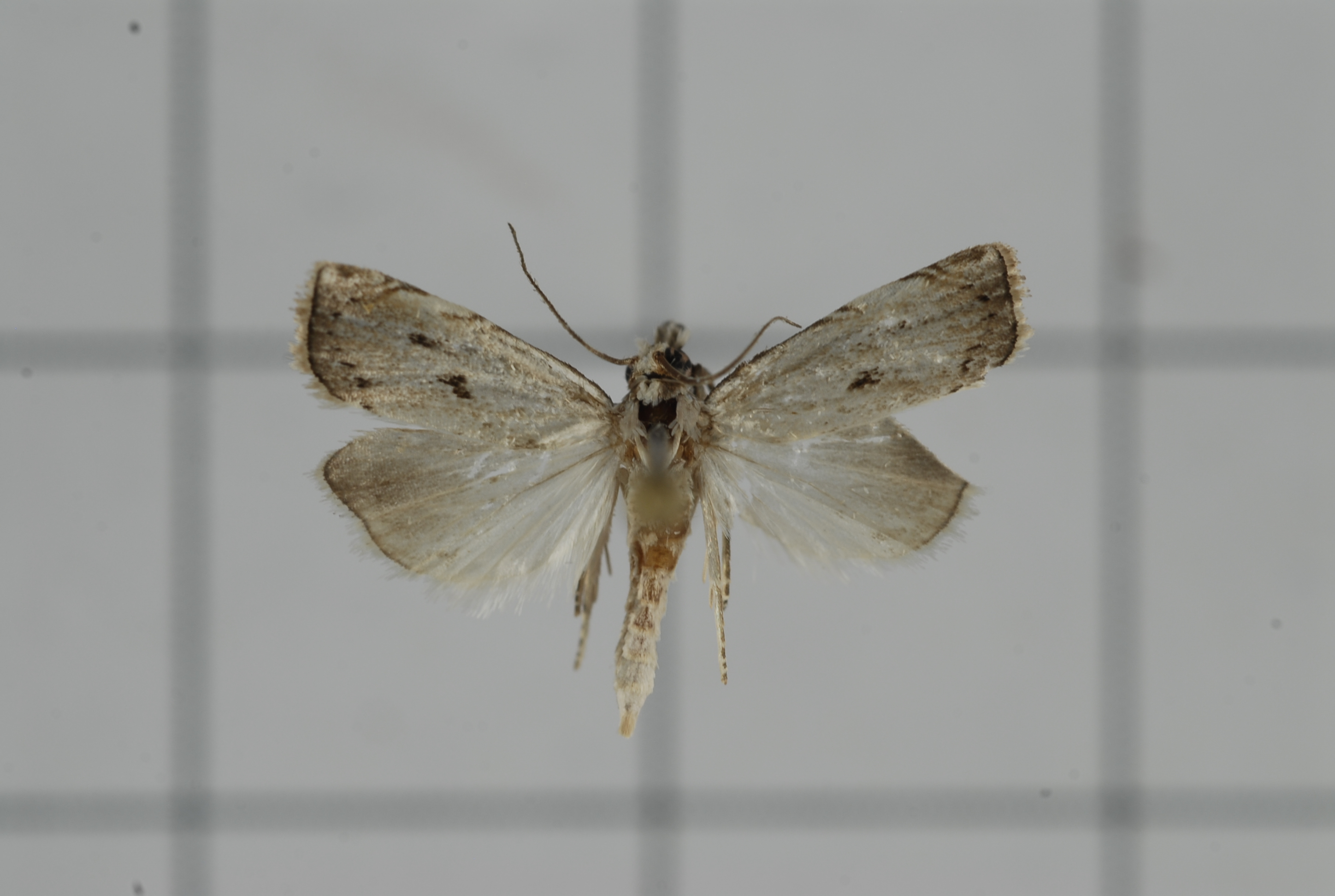
Pseudocatharylla duplicellus

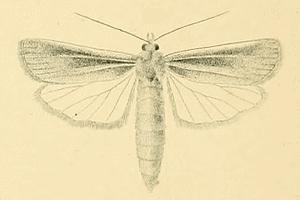
Thopeutis galleriellus

==== Cybalomiinae ====
- Hendecasis duplifascialis (Hampson, 1891)
- Ptychopseustis argentisparsalis (Hampson, 1896)
- Ptychopseustis fuscivenalis (Hampson, 1896)
- Trichophysetis nigricincta Hampson, 1893
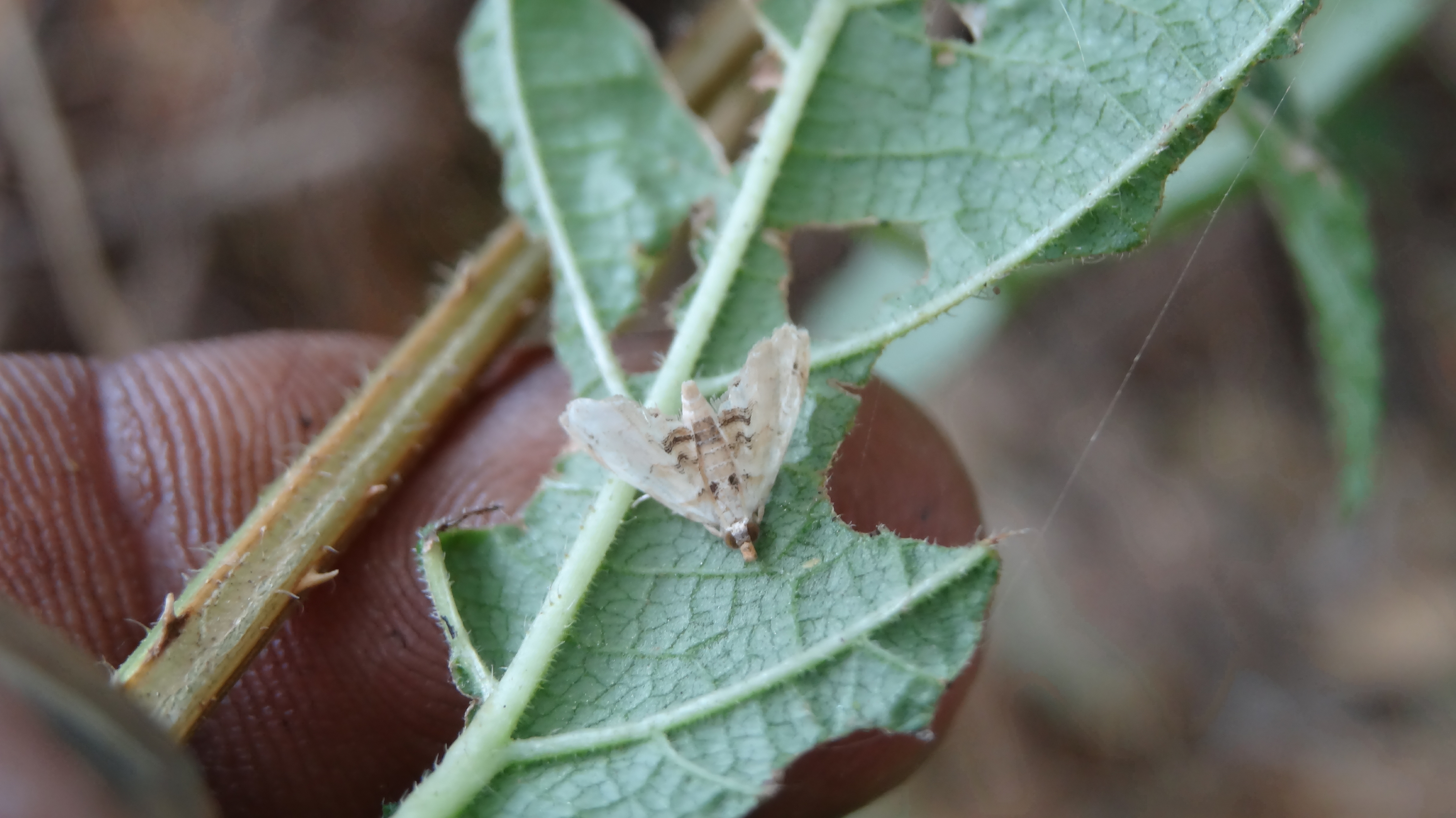
Hendecasis duplifascialis

==== Epipaschiinae ====
- Lepidogma melanolopha Hampson
- Macalla nubilalis (Hampson, 1893)
- Orthaga euadrusalis Walker, 1858
- Salma validalis (Walker, 1866)
- Teliphasa nubilosa (Moore, 1888)
- Termioptycha albifurcalis Hampson, 1916)
- Termioptycha margarita (Butler, 1879)

==== Evergestinae ====
- Crocidolomia suffusalis (Hampson, 1891)
- Crocidolomia pavonana (Fabricius, 1794)
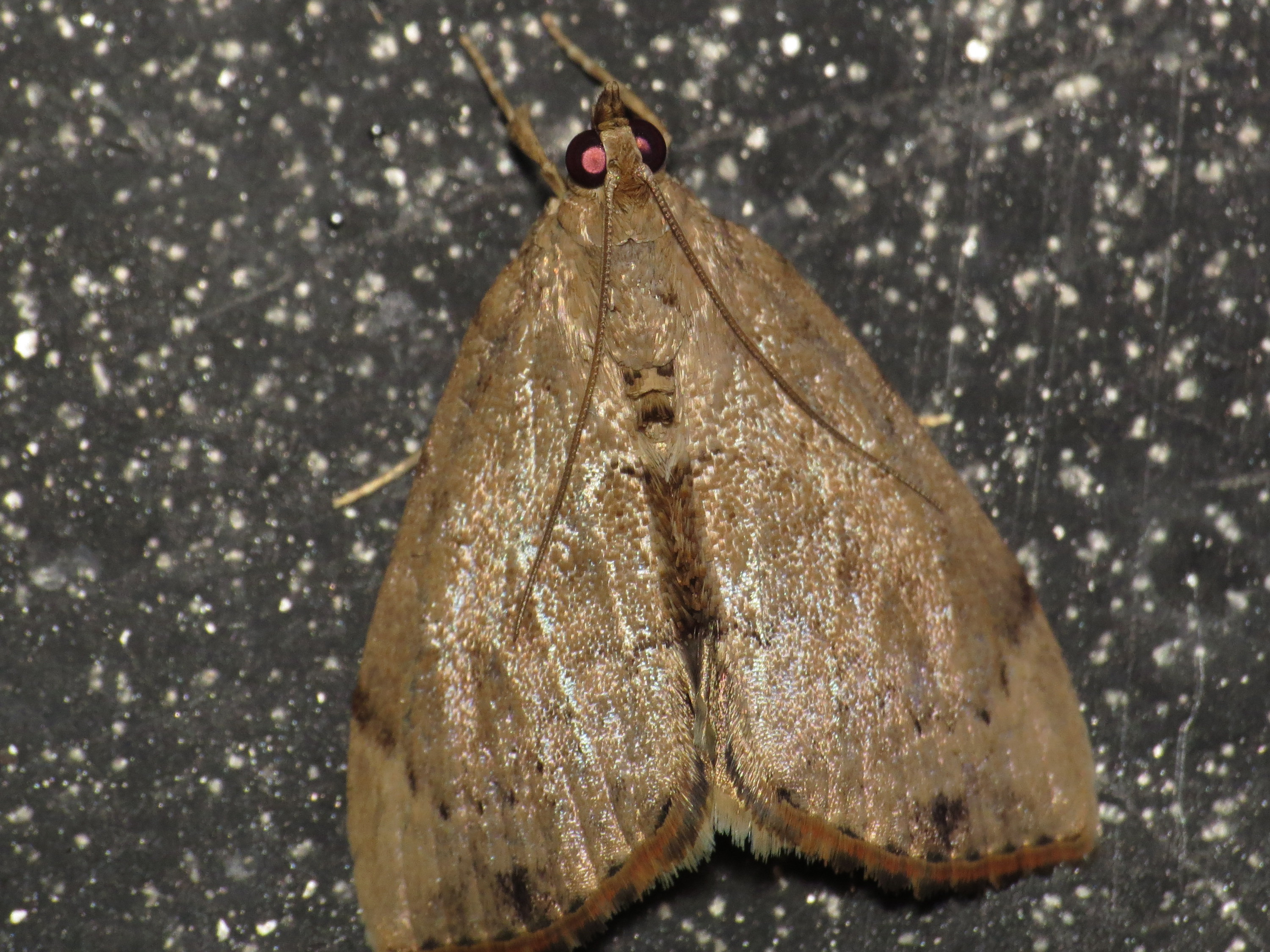
Crocidolomia suffusalis

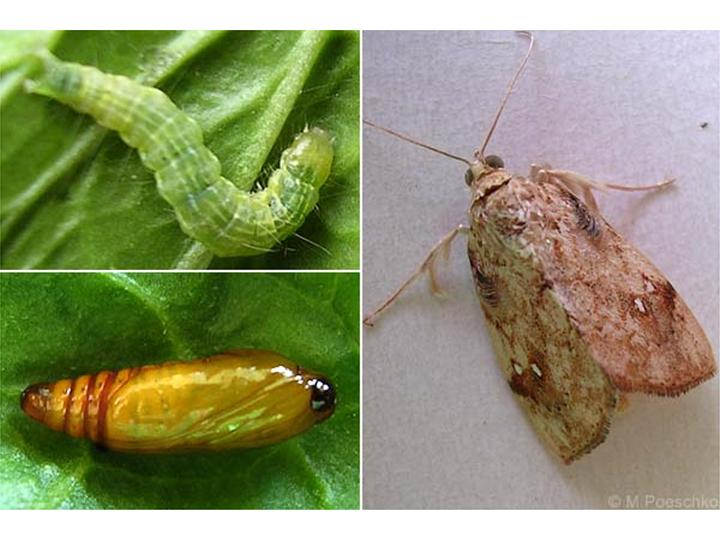
Crocidolomia pavonana

==== Musotiminae ====
- Drosophantis caerulata (Hampson, 1893)

==== Noordinae ====
- Noorda blitealis Walker, 1859
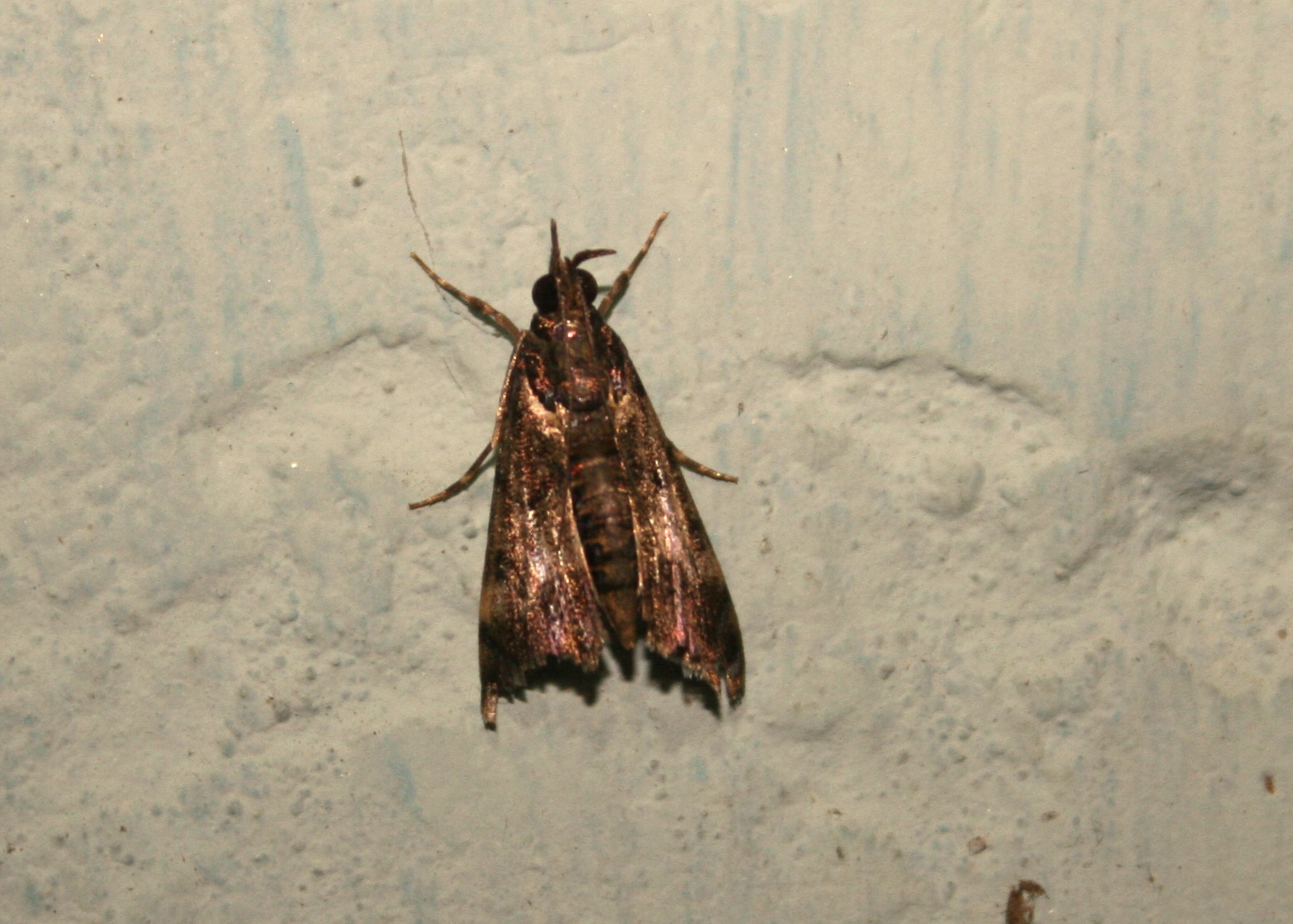
Noorda blitealis

==== Odontiinae ====
- Heortia vitessoides (Moore 1885)
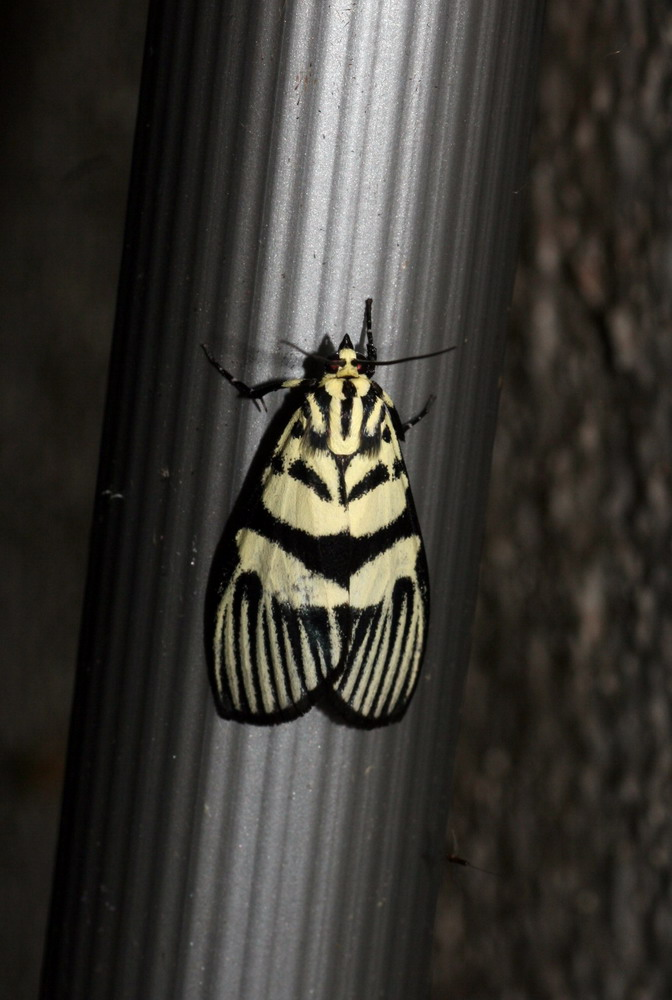
Heortia vitessoides

==== Pyraustinae ====
- Achyra coelatalis (Walker, 1859)
- Achyra nudalis (Hübner, 1796)
- Anania obliquata (Moore, 1888)
- Daulia argyrophoralis Hampson, 1907
- Euclasta defamatalis (Walker, 1859)
- Euclasta filigeralis Lederer, 1863
- Glauconoe deductalis (Walker, 1859)
- Hodebertia testalis (Fabricius, 1794)
- Hyalobathra illectalis (Walker, 1859)
- Hyalobathra undulinea (Hampson, 1891)
- Isocentris filalis (Guenée, 1854)
- Mabra eryxalis (Walker, 1859)
- Massepha absolutalis Walker, 1859
- Nevrina procopia (Stoll, [1781])
- Paliga celatalis (Walker, 1859)
- Paliga machoeralis (Walker, 1859)
- Symmoracma minoralis (Snellen, 1880)
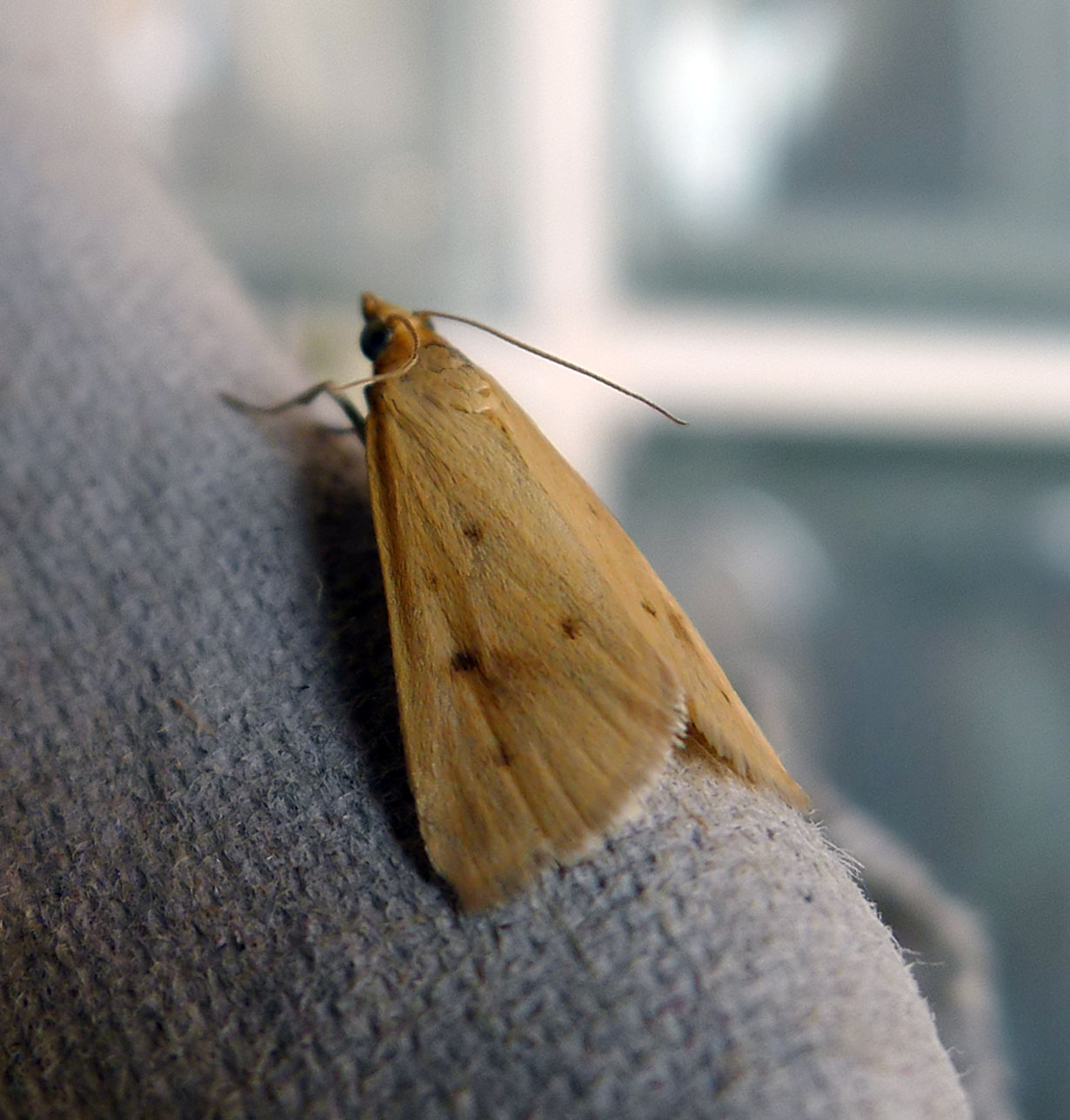
Achyra nudalis

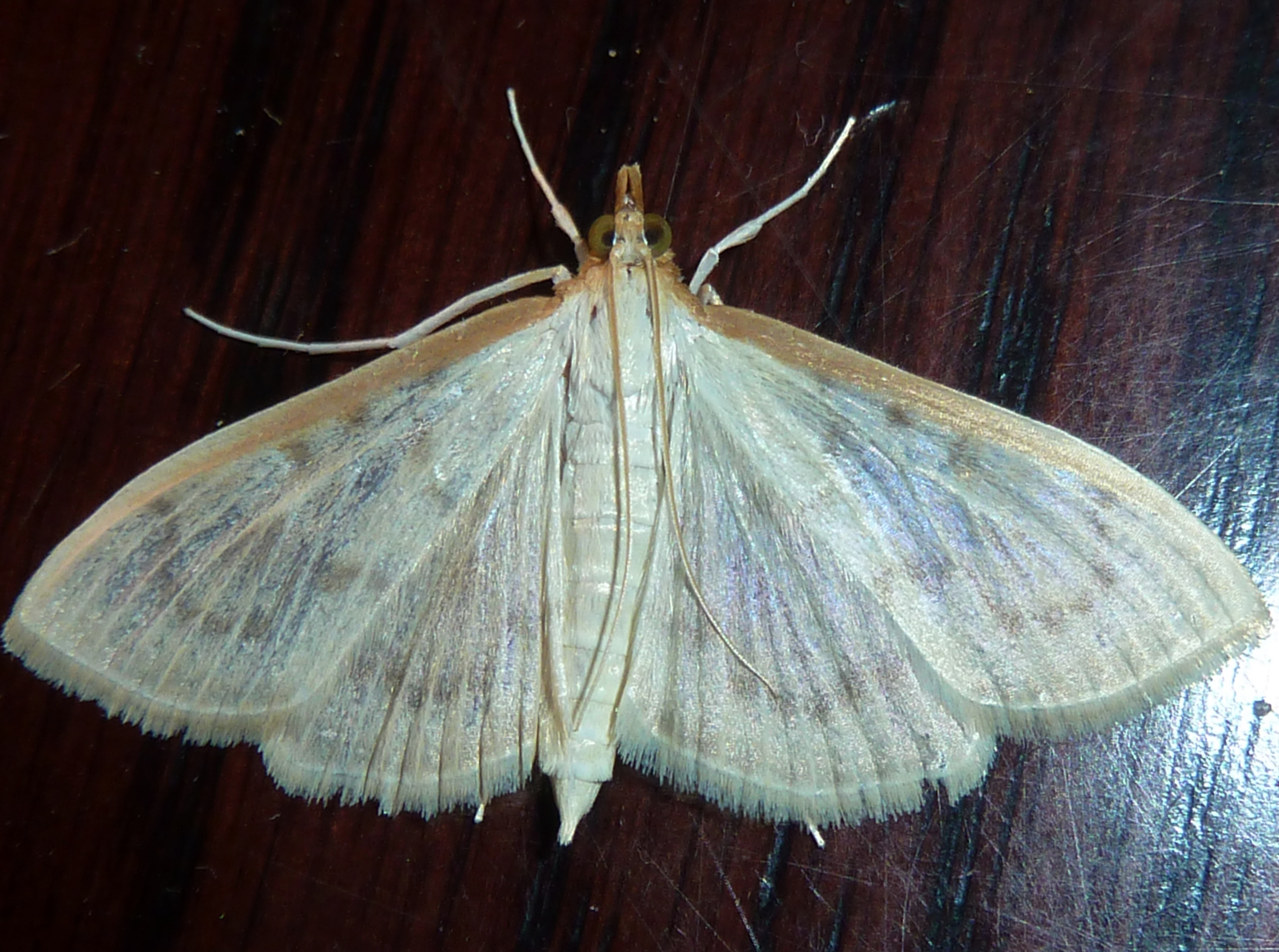
Hodebertia testalis

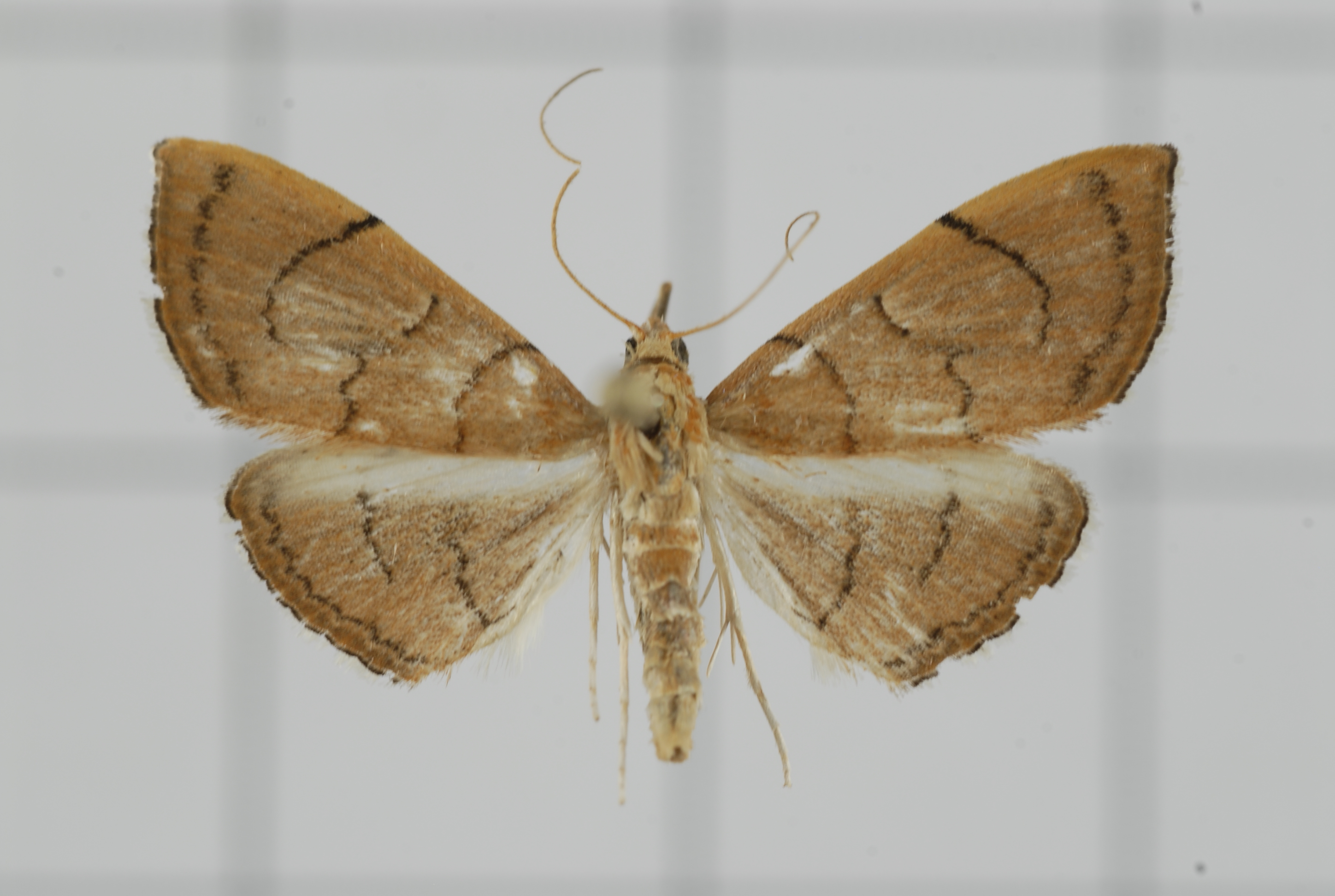
Hyalobathra illectalis

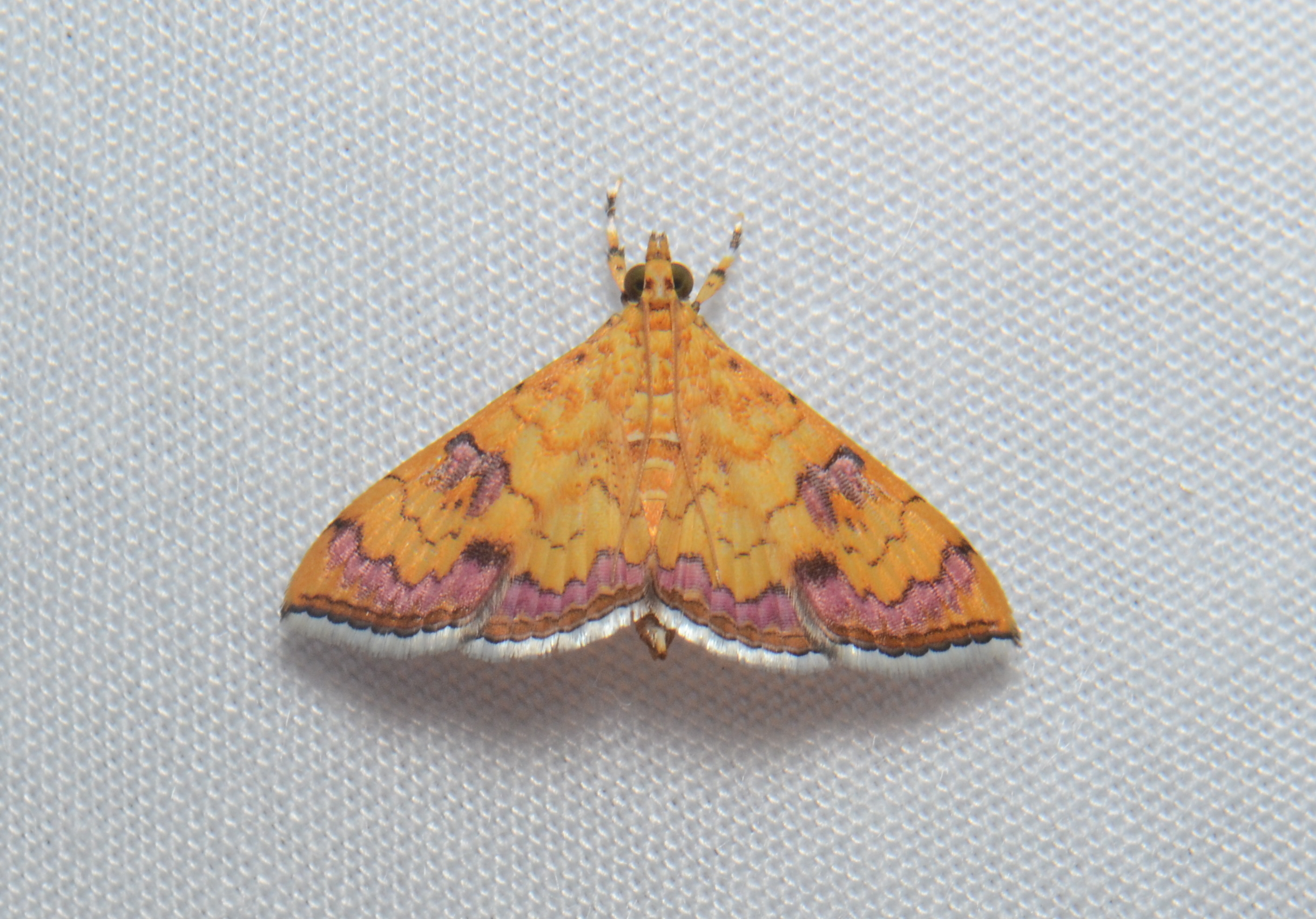
Isocentris filalis

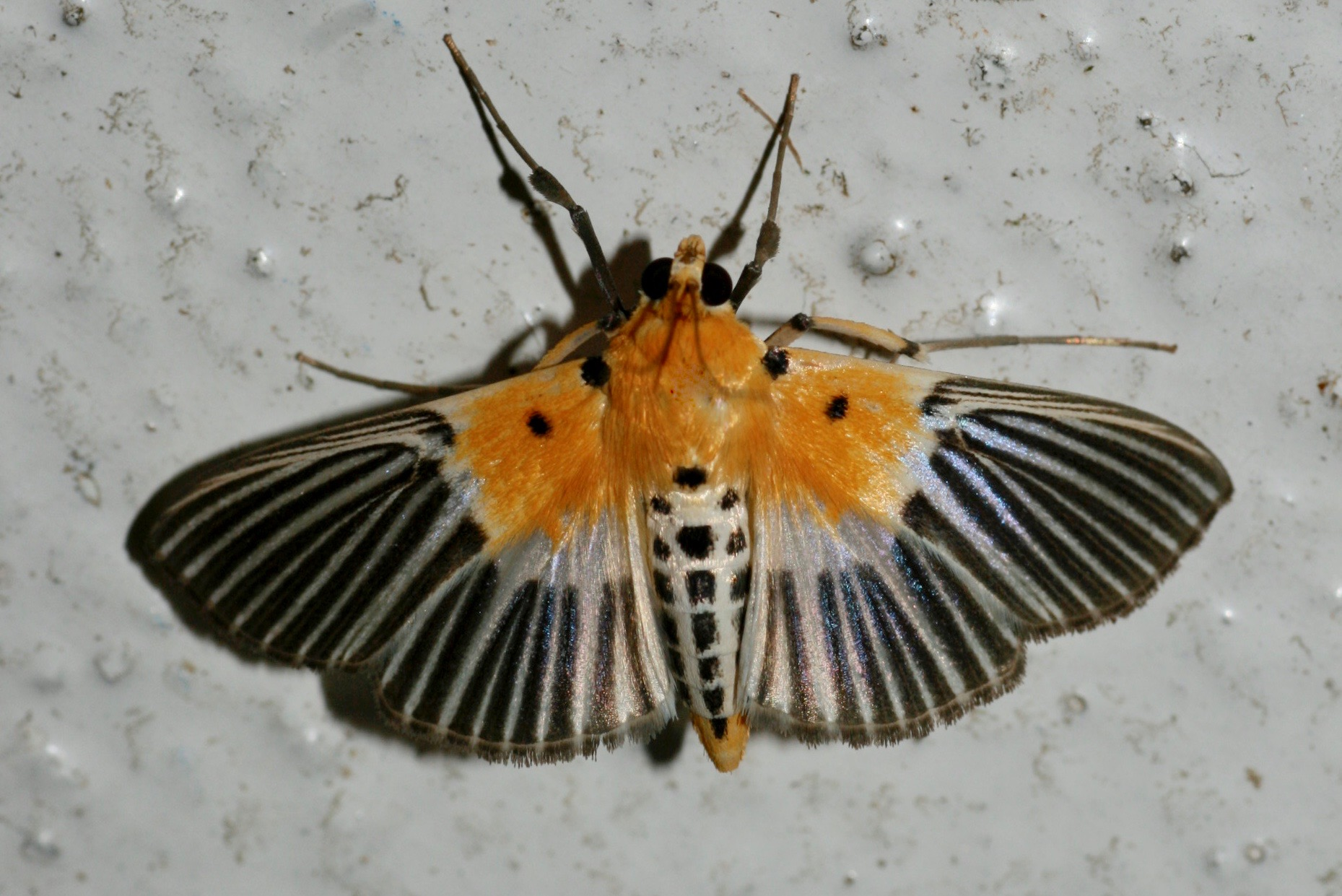
Nevrina procopia

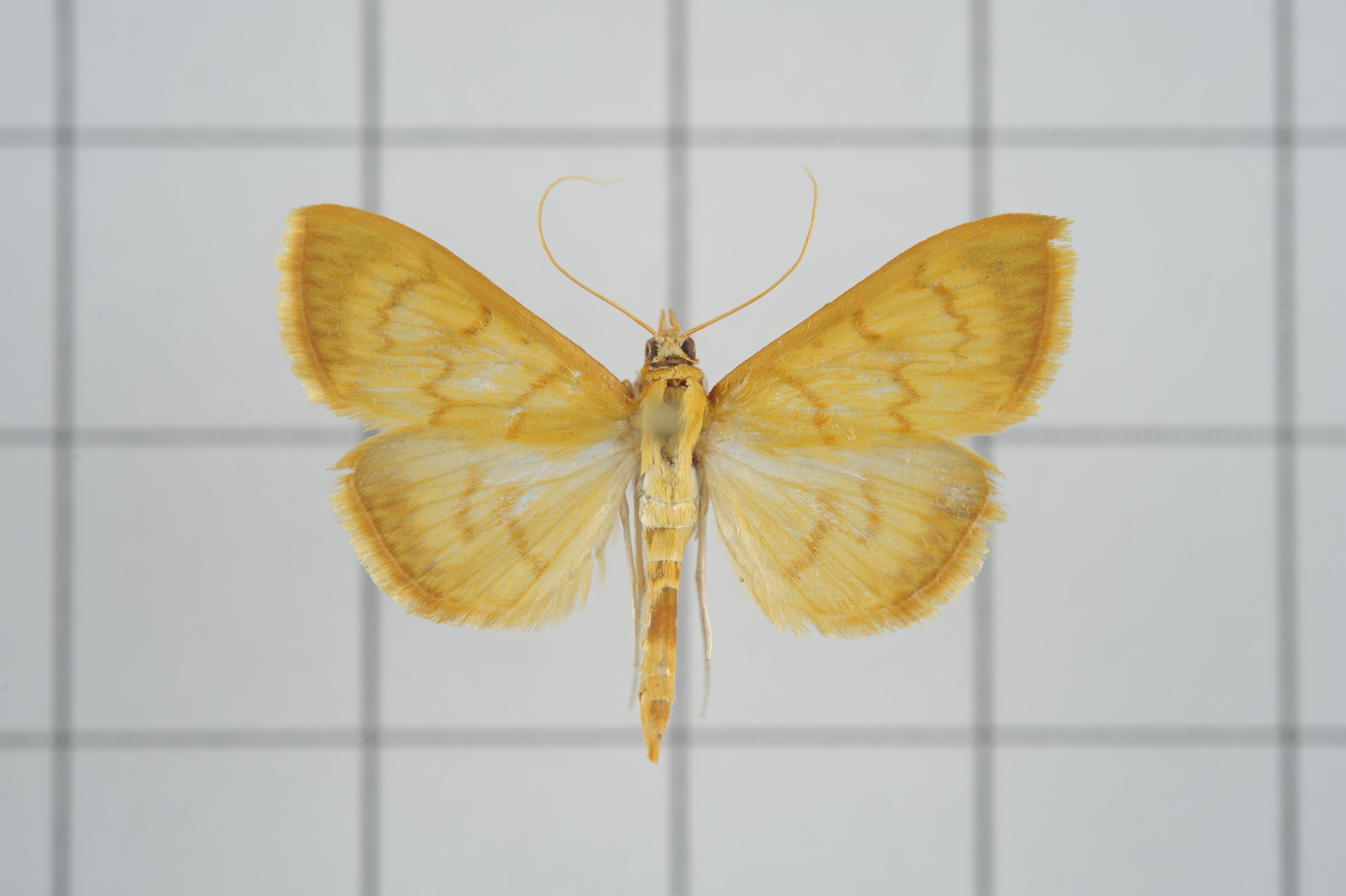
Paliga celatalis

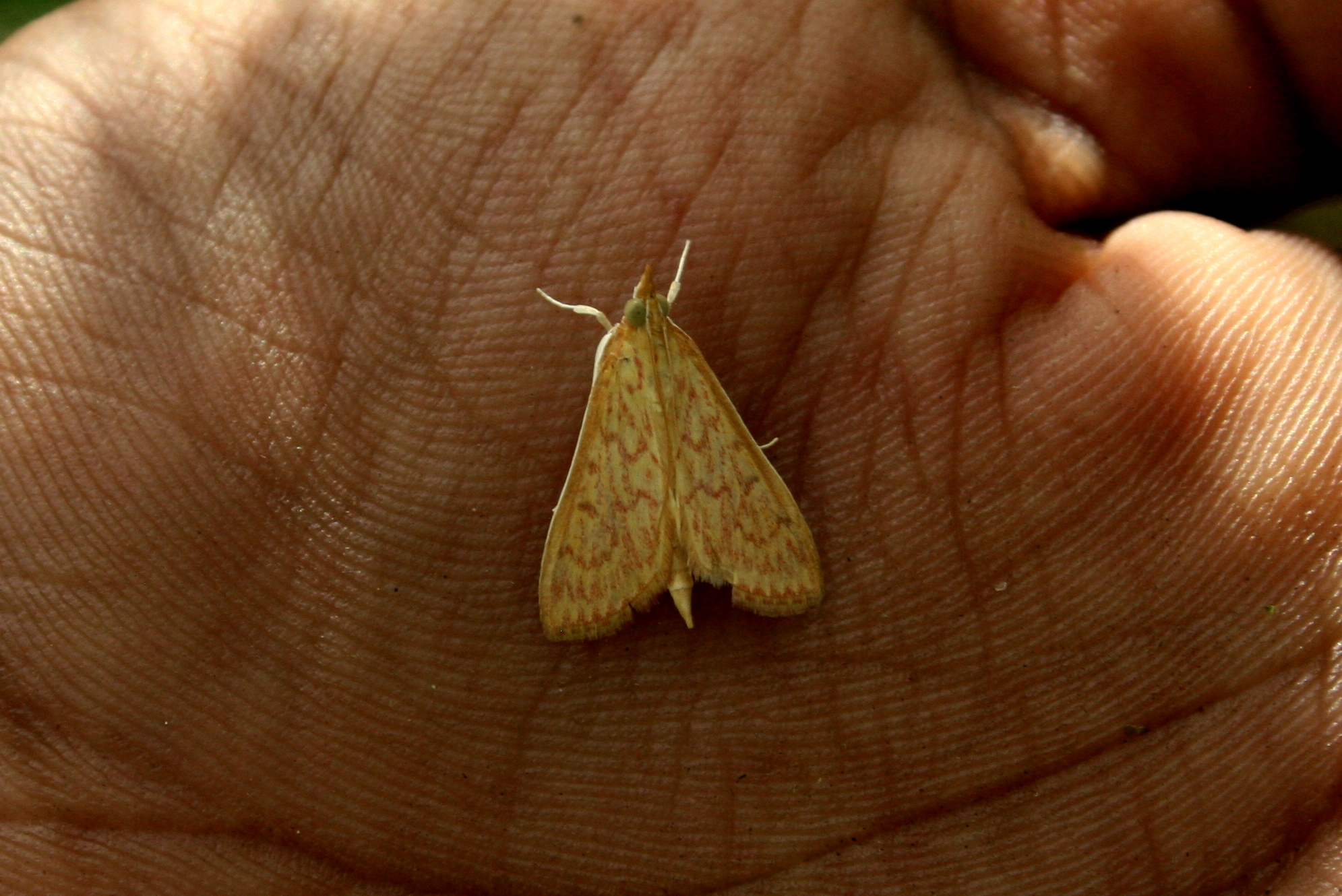
Paliga machoeralis

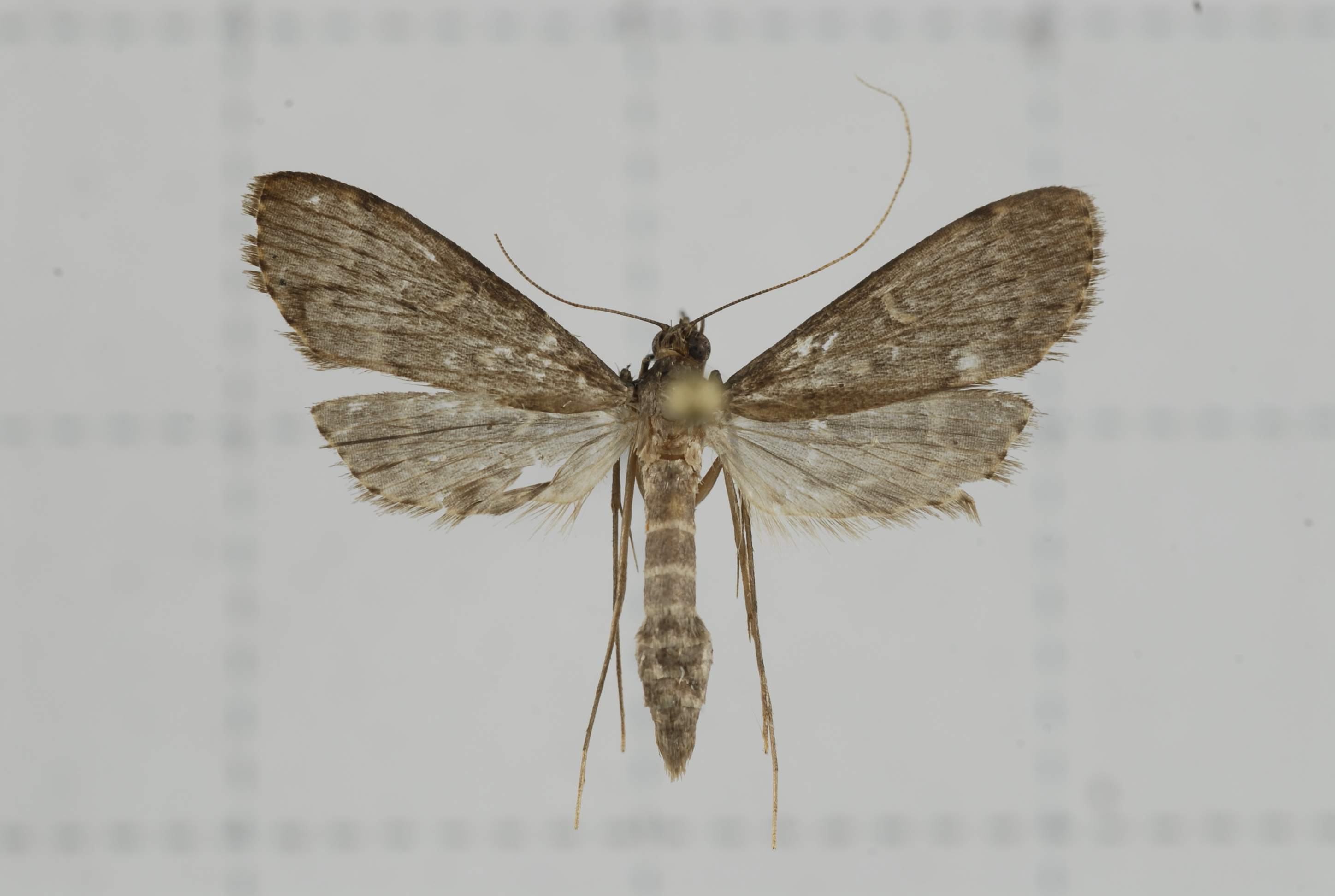
Symmoracma minoralis

==== Schoenobiinae ====
- Catagela adjurella Walker, 1863
- Donacaula dodatellus (Walker, 1864)
- Patissa curvilinealis Hampson, 1896
- Patissa erythrozonalis Hampson, 1896
- Patissa lactealis (Felder, Felder & Rogenhofer, 1875)
- Patissa virginea (Zeller, 1852)
- Ramila acciusalis Walker, 1859
- Ramila ruficostalis Hampson, 1893
- Schoenobius immeritalis Walker, 1859
- Scirpophaga fusciflua Hampson, 1893
- Scirpophaga incertulas (Walker, 1863)
- Scirpophaga nivella (Fabricius, 1794)
- Scirpophaga whalleyi Lewvanich, 1981
- Scirpophaga xanthogastrella (Walker, 1863)
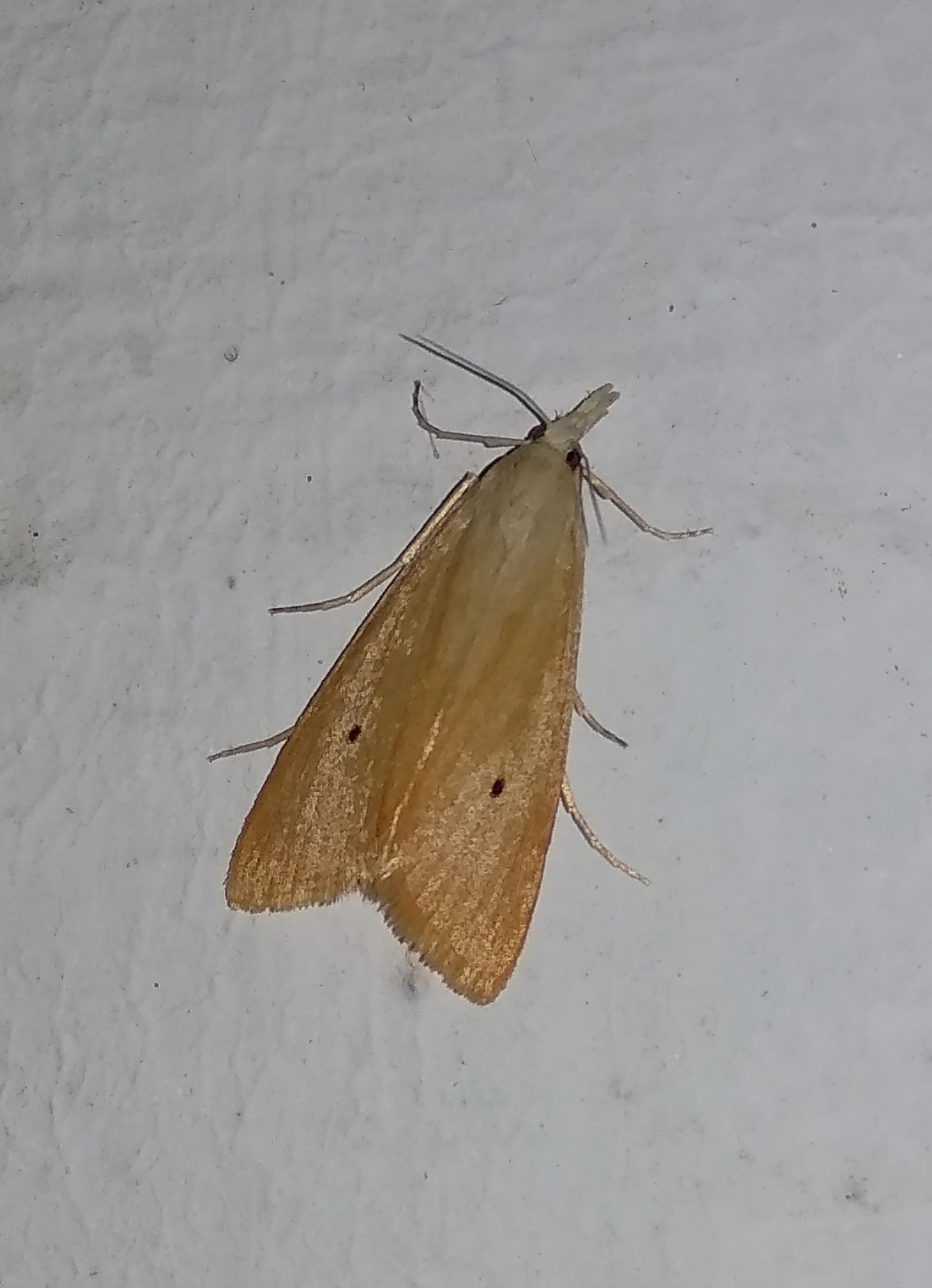
Scirpophaga incertulas

==== Scopariinae ====
- Scoparia albifusalis Hampson, 1907
- Scoparia congestalis Walker, 1859
- Scoparia murificalis Walker, 159

==== Spilomelinae - spilomeline moths ====
- Aethaloessa calidalis (Guenée, 1854)
- Agathodes ostentalis (Geyer, 1837)
- Agrioglypta eurytusalis (Walker, 1859)
- Agrioglypta excelsalis (Walker, 1866)
- Agrotera basinotata Hampson, 1891
- Agrotera barcealis (Walker, 1859)
- Agrotera effertalis (Walker, 1859)
- Agrotera scissalis (Walker, 1866)
- Analyta apicalis Hampson, 1896)
- Archernis capitalis (Fabricius, 1794)
- Ategumia adipalis (Lederer, 1863)
- Bocchoris acamasalis (Walker, 1859)
- Bocchoris inspersalis (Zeller, 1852)
- Bocchoris tenera (Butler, 1883)
- Bocchoris trivitralis (Warren, 1895)
- Botyodes asialis Guneée, 1854
- Bradina adhaesalis (Walker, 1859)
- Bradina admixtalis (Walker, 1859)
- Chalcidoptera emissalis Walker, [1866]
- Cirrhochrista bracteolalis Hampson, 1891
- Cirrhochrista pulchellalis Lederer, 1863
- Cnaphalocrocis medinalis (Guenée, 1854)
- Cnaphalocrocis patnalis Bradley, 1981
- Conogethes punctiferalis (Guenée, 1854)
- Cotachena histricalis (Walker, 1859)
- Cydalima laticostalis (Guenée, 1854)
- Diaphania glauculalis (Guenée, 1854)
- Diaphania indica (Saunders, 1851)
- Diathrausta profundalis Lederer, 1863
- Dysallacta negatalis (Walker, 1859)
- Eurrhyparodes bracteolalis (Zeller, 1852)
- Eurrhyparodes tricoloralis (Zeller, 1852)
- Glycythyma chrysorycta (Meyrick, 1884)
- Glyphodes actorionalis (Walker, 1859)
- Glyphodes bicolor (Swainson, 1821)
- Glyphodes bivitralis Guenée, 1854
- Glyphodes caesalis Walker, 1859
- Glyphodes canthusalis Walker, 1859
- Glyphodes onychinalis (Guenée, 1854)
- Glyphodes pyloalis Walker, 1859
- Glyphodes stolalis Guenée, 1854
- Haritalodes derogata (Fabricius, 1775)
- Herpetogramma basalis (Walker, 1865)
- Herpetogramma cynaralis (Walker, 1859)
- Herpetogramma hipponalis (Walker, 1859)
- Herpetogramma licarsisalis (Walker, 1859)
- Herpetogramma phaeopteralis (Guenée, 1854)
- Hydriris ornatalis (Duponchel, 1832
- Hymenia perspectalis (Hübner, 1796)
- Ischnurges gratiosalis (Walker, 1859)
- Lamprosema commixta (Butler, 1879)
- Lamprosema fuscifimbrialis (Hampson, 1896)
- Leucinodes orbonalis Guenée, 1854
- Lygropia distorta (Moore, 1885)
- Maruca vitrata (Fabricius, 1787)
- Metasia tiasalis Walker 1859
- Metoeca foedalis (Guenée, 1854)
- Mimudea brevialis Walker, 1859
- Nacoleia charesalis (Walker, 1859)
- Nausinoe geometralis (Guenée, 1854)
- Nausinoe perspectata (Fabricius, 1775)
- Nistra coelatalis (Walker, 1859)
- Omiodes diemenalis (Guenée, 1854)
- Omiodes indicata (Fabricius, 1775)
- Omiodes surrectalis (Walker, 1866)
- Omphisa anastomosalis Guenée, in Boisduval and Guenée, 1854
- Omphisa illisalis (Walker, 1859)
- Pagyda botydalis (Snellen, 1880)
- Pagyda salvalis Walker, 1859
- Palpita annulata (Fabricius, 1794)
- Palpita nigropunctalis (Bremer, 1864)
- Pardomima amyntusalis (Walker, 1859)
- Parotis marinata Fabricius, 1794
- Patania balteata (Fabricius, 1798)
- Patania deficiens (Moore, 1887)
- Patania iopasalis (Walker, 1859)
- Patania sabinusalis (Walker, 1859)
- Patania ultimalis Walker, 1859
- Phostria obscurata (Moore, 1886)
- Poliobotys ablactalis (Walker, 1859)
- Polygrammodes sabelialis (Guenée, 1854)
- Polythlipta divaricata Moore, 1886
- Pramadea crotonalis (Walker, 1859)
- Pramadea lunalis (Guenée, 1854)
- Prophantis octoguttalis (Felder & Roggenhofer, 1874)
- Psara admensalis (Walker, 1859)
- Pycnarmon meritalis (Walker, 1859)
- Pycnarmon virgatalis (Moore, 1867)
- Pygospila tyres (Cramer, 1780)
- Rehimena phrynealis (Walker, 1859)
- Rehimena surusalis (Walker, 1859)
- Rhimphaliodes macrostigma Hampson, 1893
- Sameodes cancellalis (Zeller, 1852)
- Spoladea recurvalis (Fabricius, 1775)
- Stemorrhages marthesiusalis (Walker, 1859)
- Stemorrhages oceanitis (Meyrick, 1886)
- Sufetula nitidalis Hampson, 1908
- Sufetula rectifascialis Hampson, 1896
- Sufetula sunidesalis Walker, 1859
- Syllepte chalybifascia Hampson, 1896
- Synclera danalis Hampson, 1893
- Synclera rotundalis Hampson, 1893
- Synclera traducalis (Zeller, 1852)
- Synclera univocalis (Walker, 1859)
- Syngamia falsidicalis (Walker, 1859)
- Syngamia latimarginalis (Walker, 1859)
- Tatobotys biannulalis (Walker, 1866)
- Tatobotys janapalis (Walker, 1859)
- Tinerastia discipunctella (Hampson, 1896)
- Tinerastia fissirella (Hampson, 1896)
- Terastia meticulosalis Guenée, 1854
- Terastia subjectalis Lederer, 1863
- Udea flavofimbriata (Moore, 1888)
- Udea ferrugalis (Hübner, 1796)
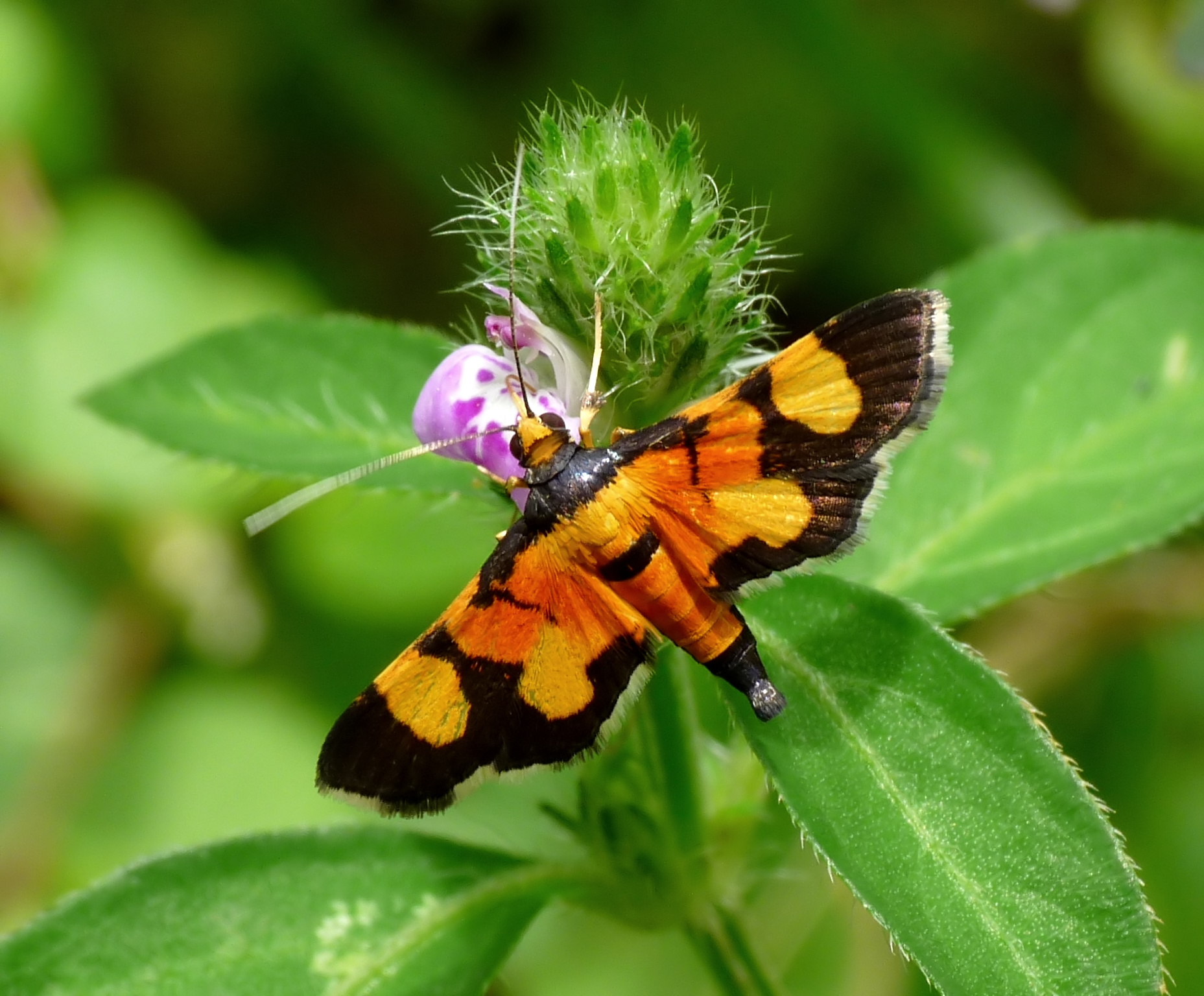
Aethaloessa calidalis

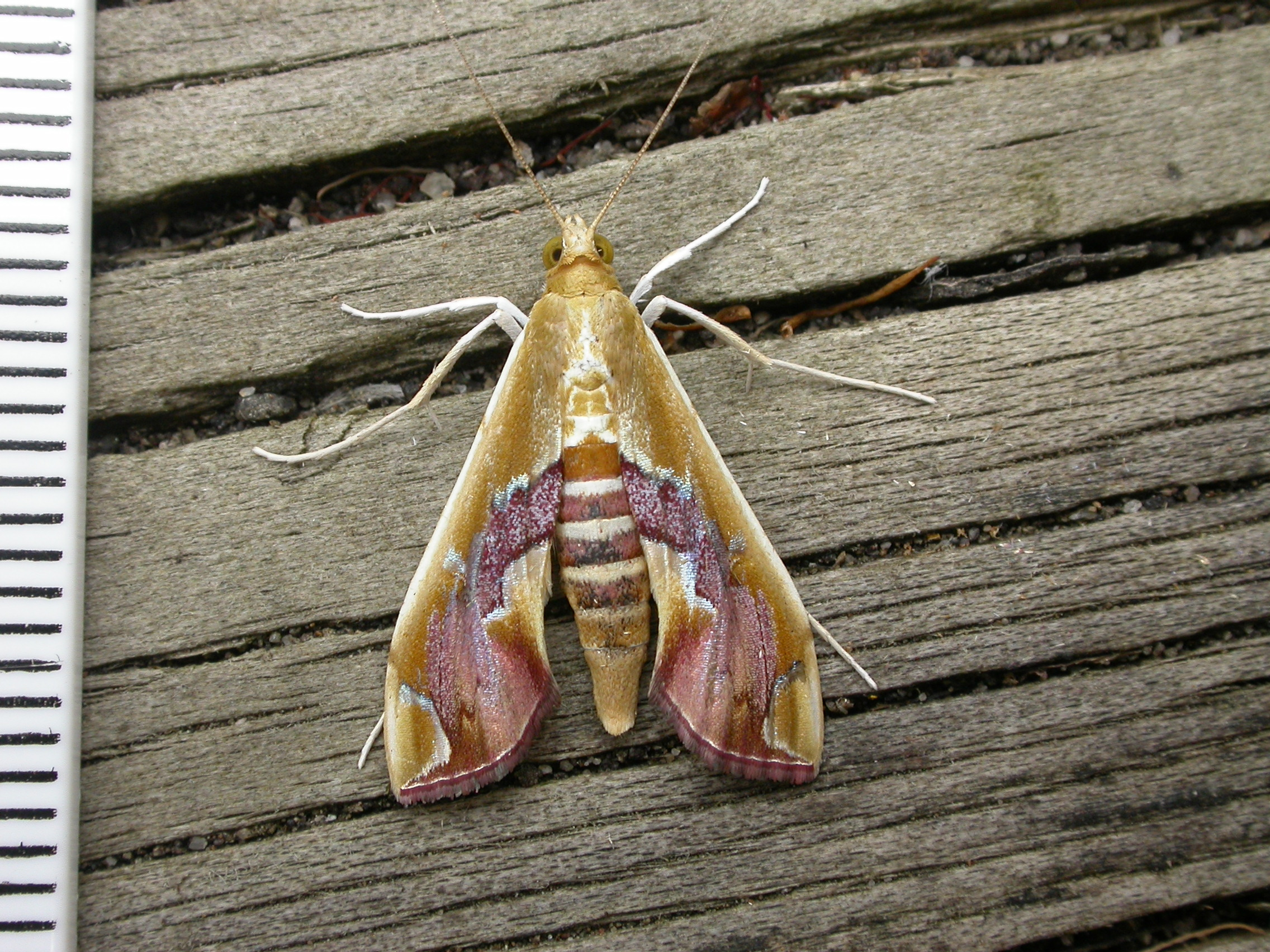
Agathodes ostentalis

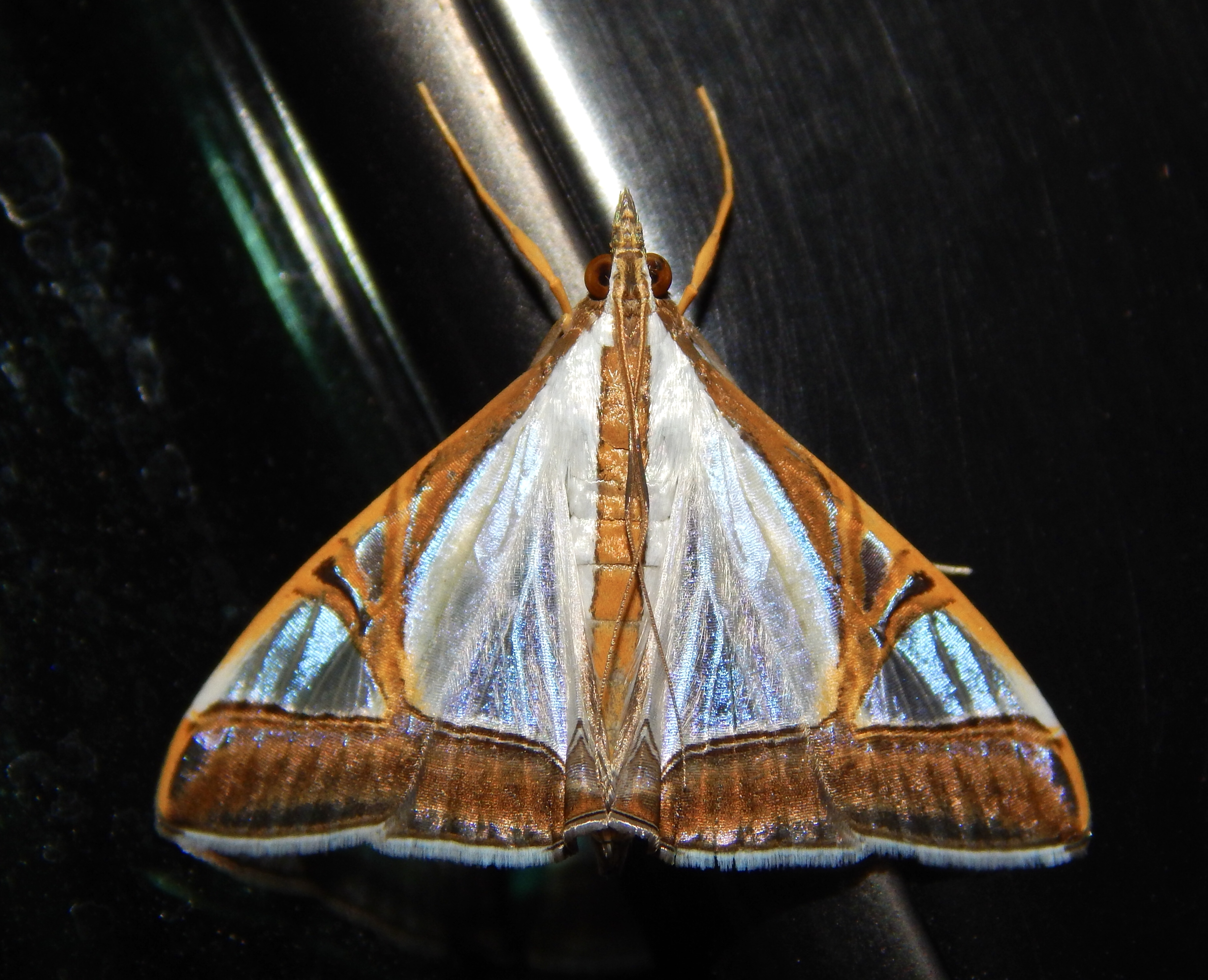
Agrioglypta eurytusalis

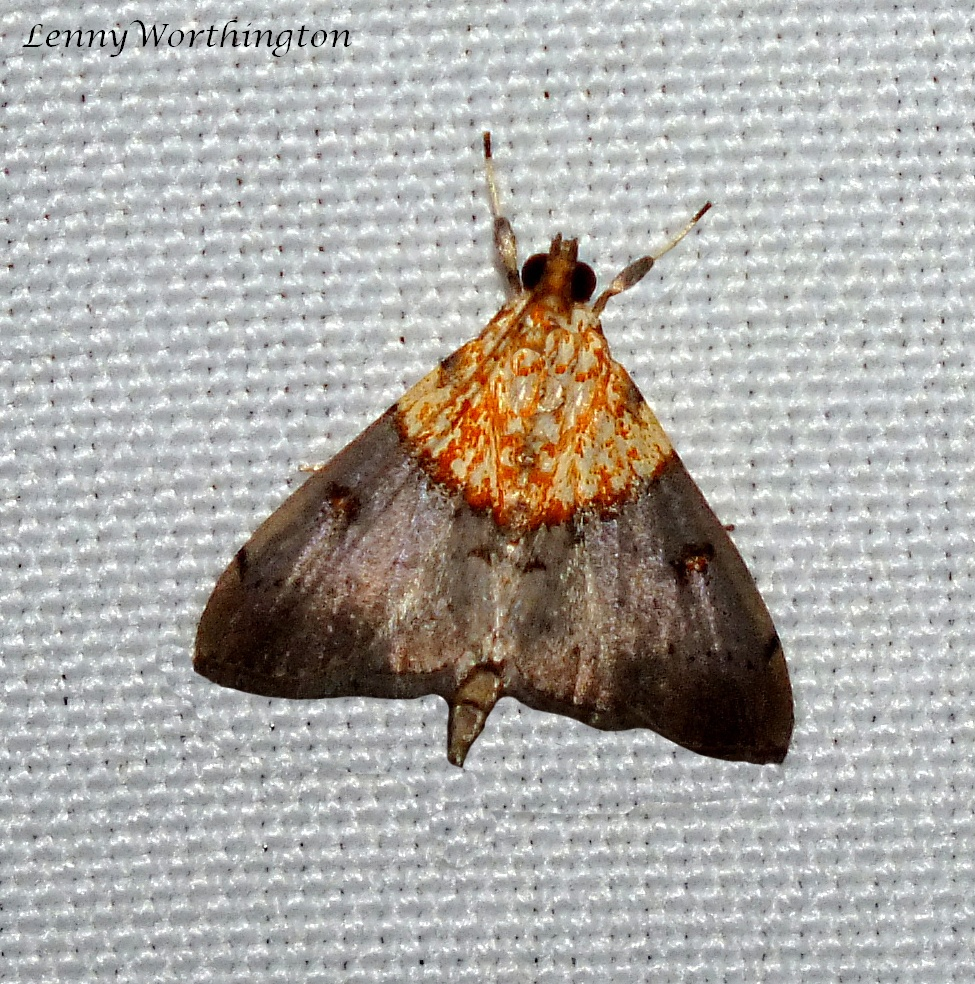
Agrotera basinotata

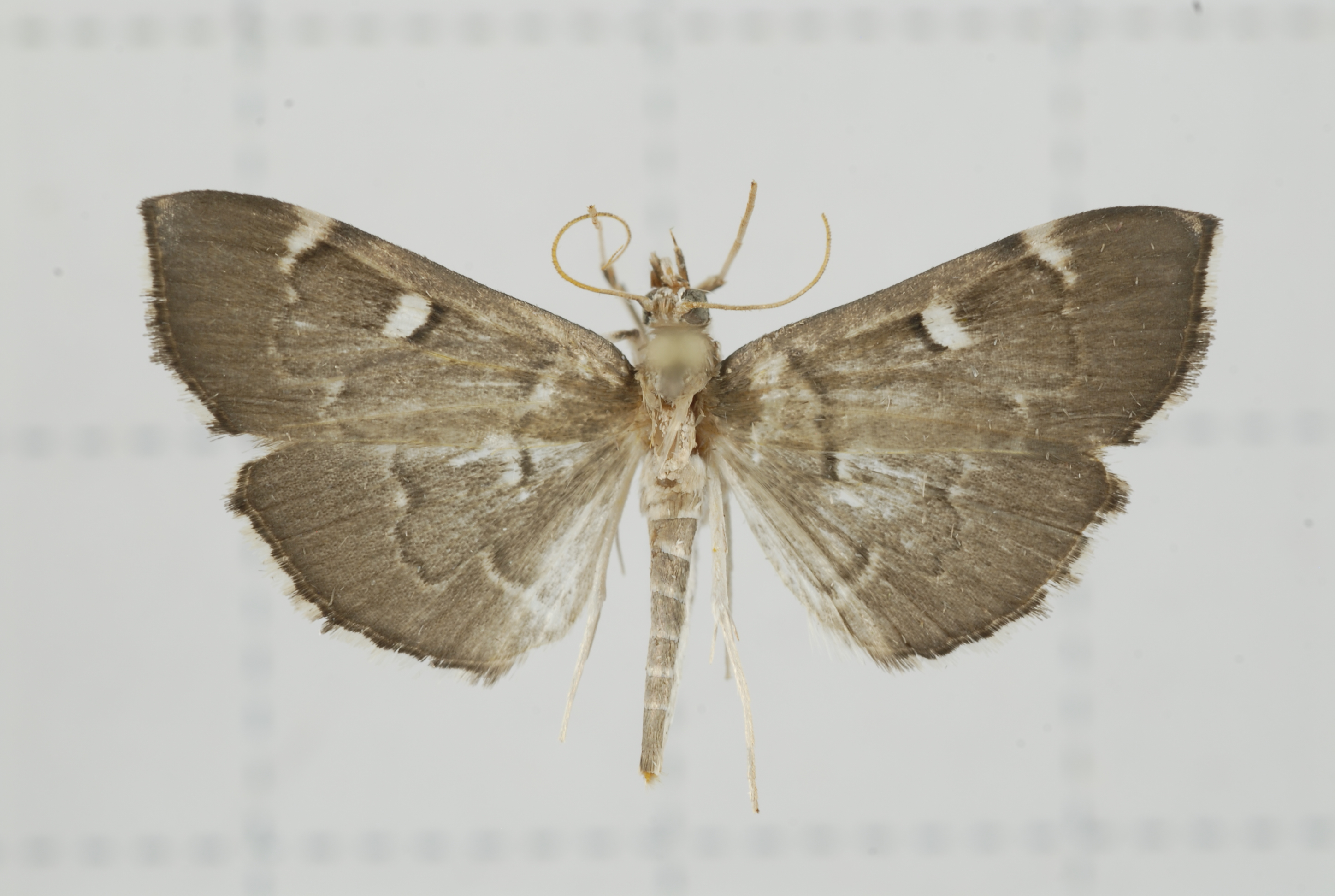
Archernis capitalis

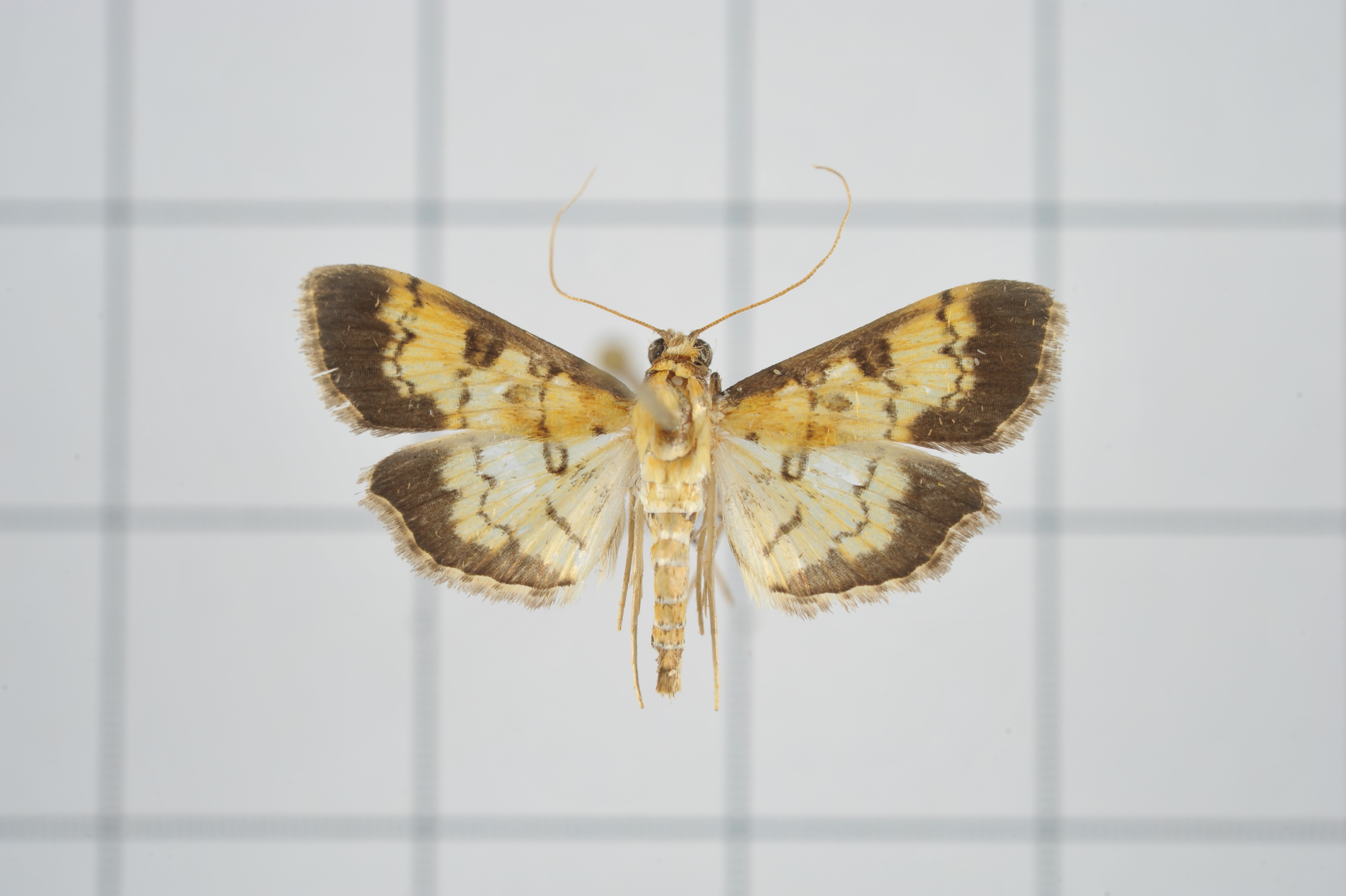
Ategumia adipalis

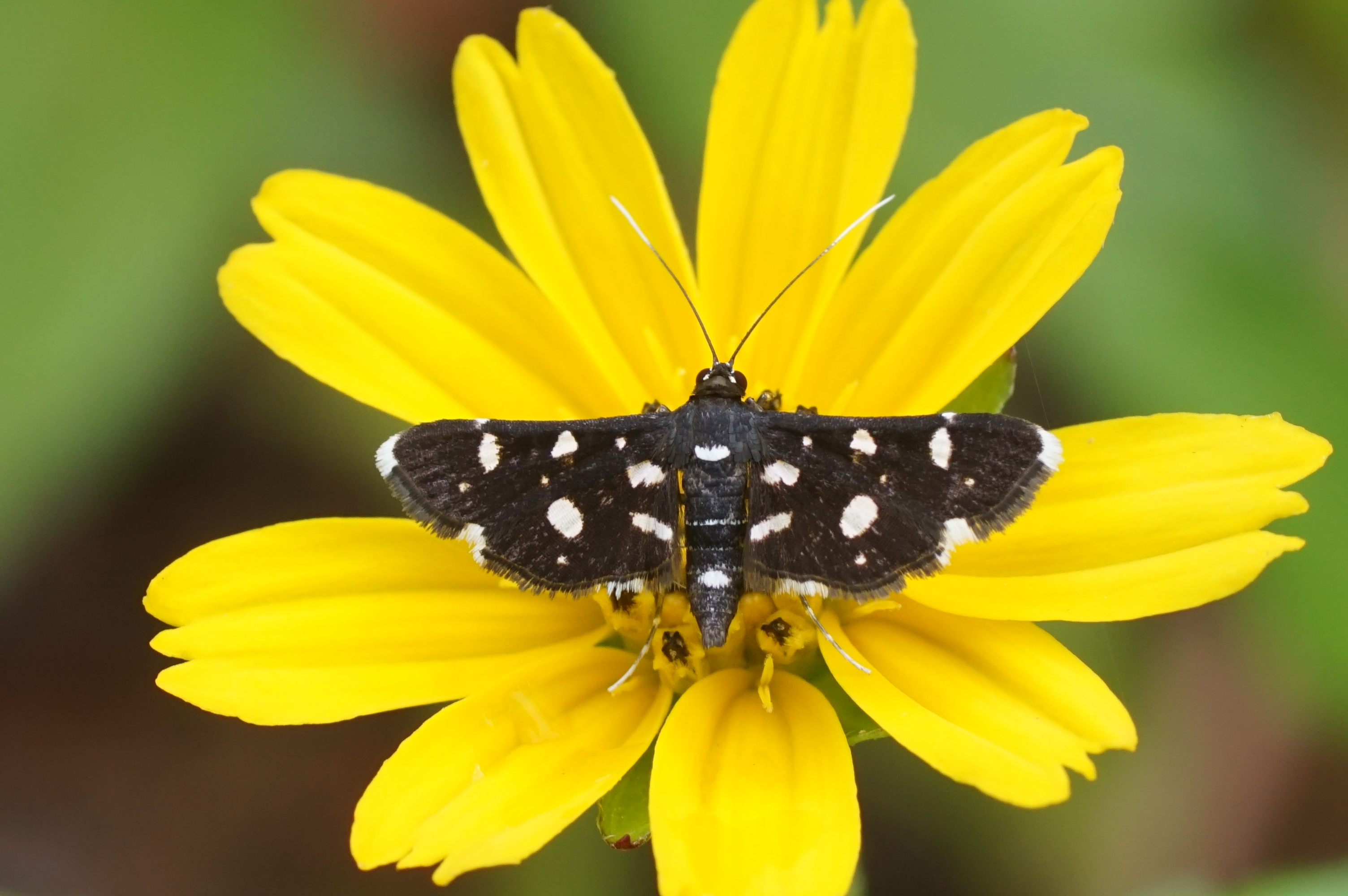
Bocchoris inspersalis

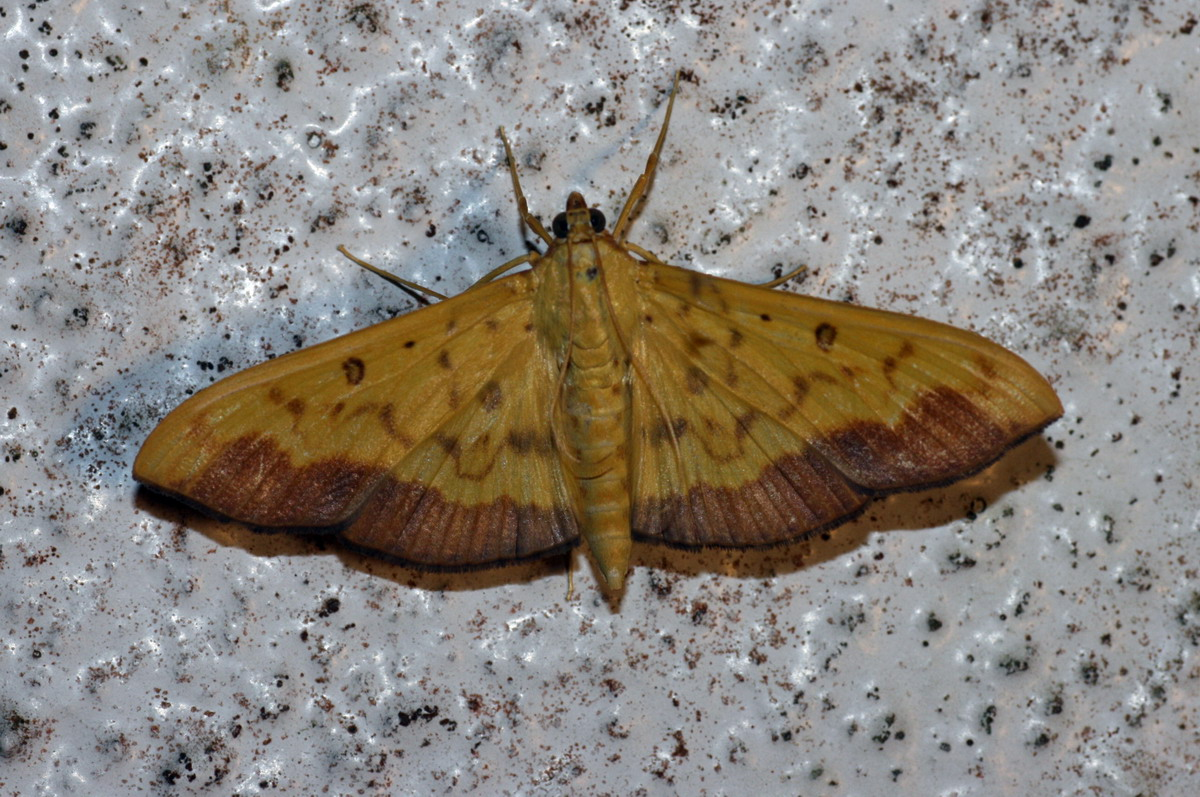
Botyodes asialis

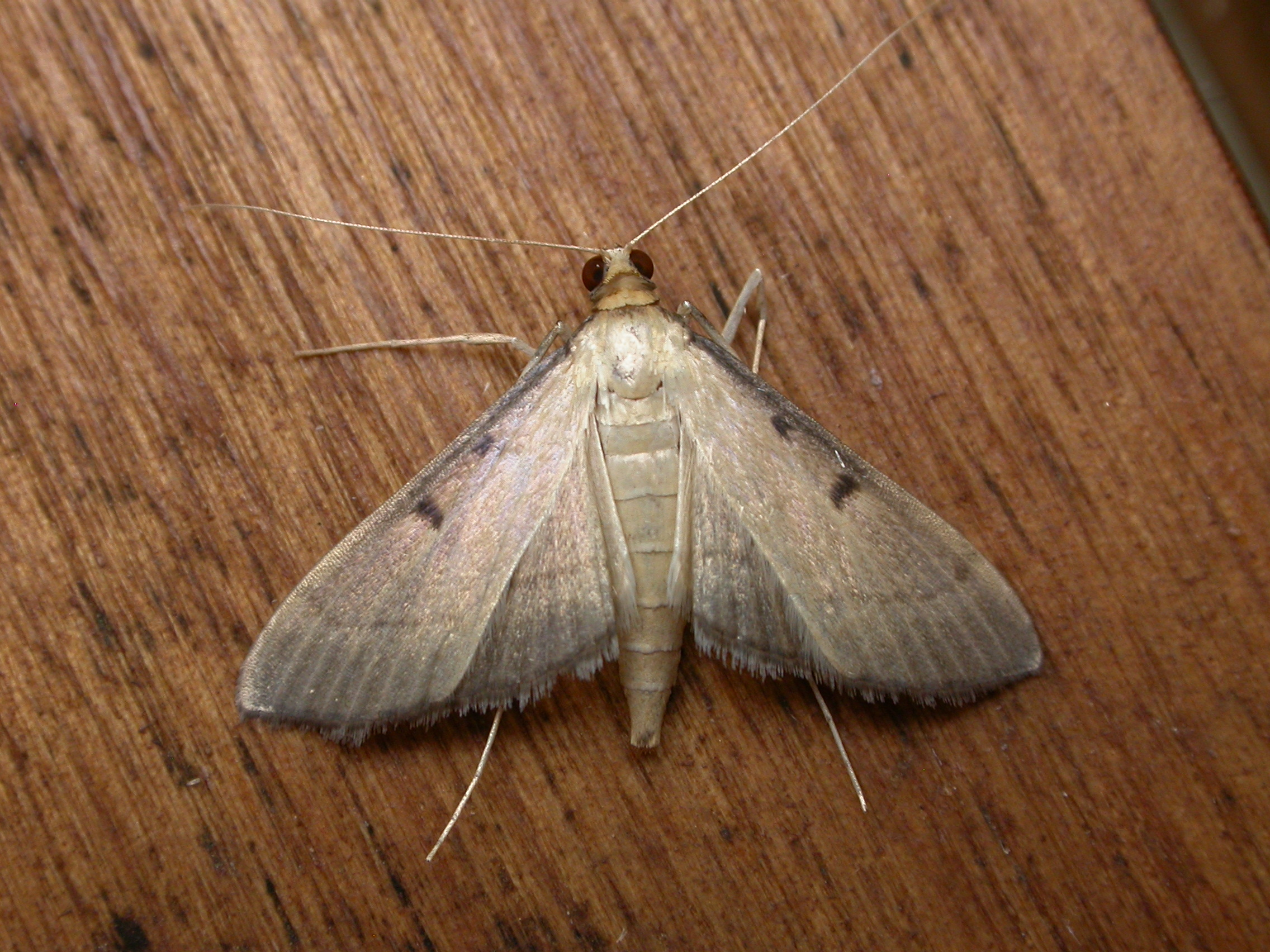
Bradina admixtalis

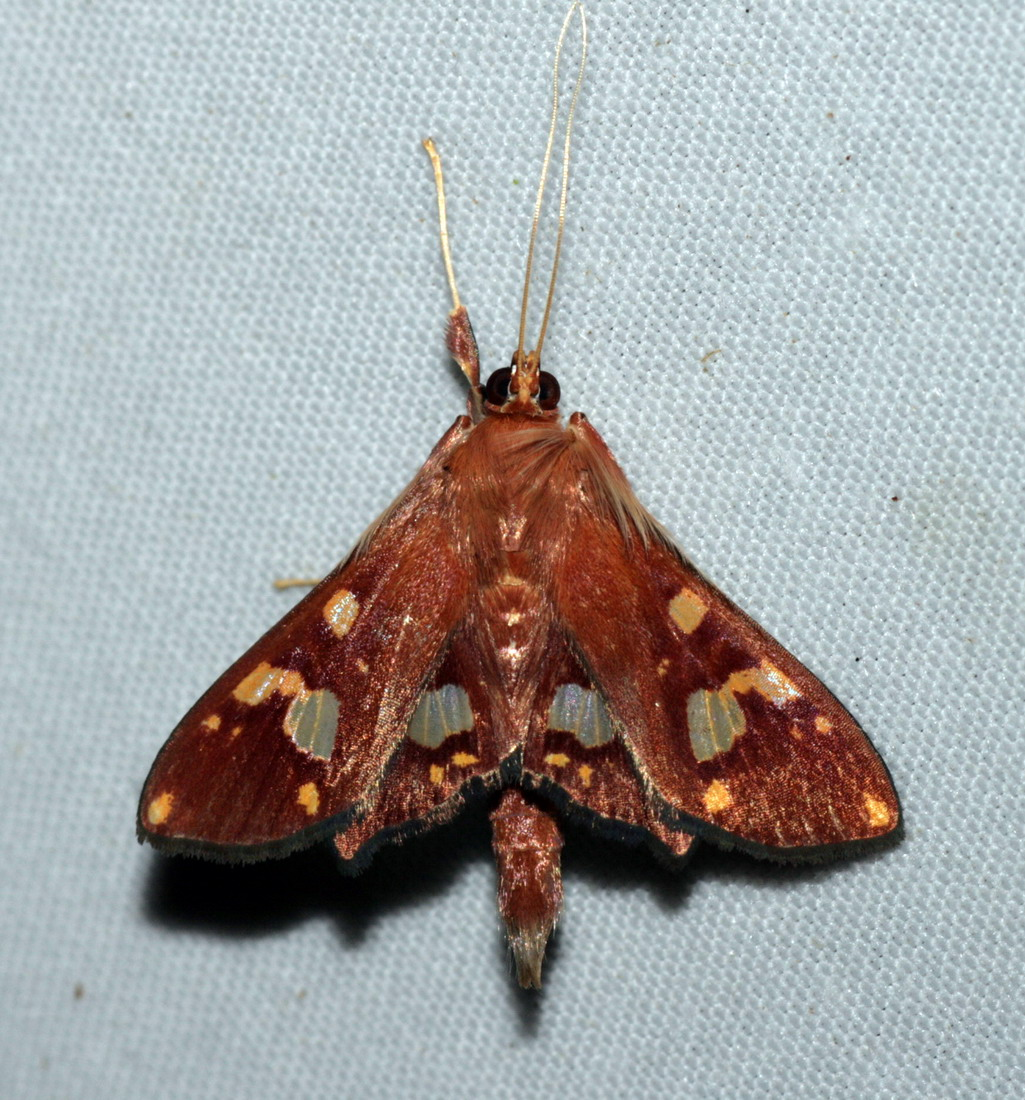
Chalcidoptera emissalis male

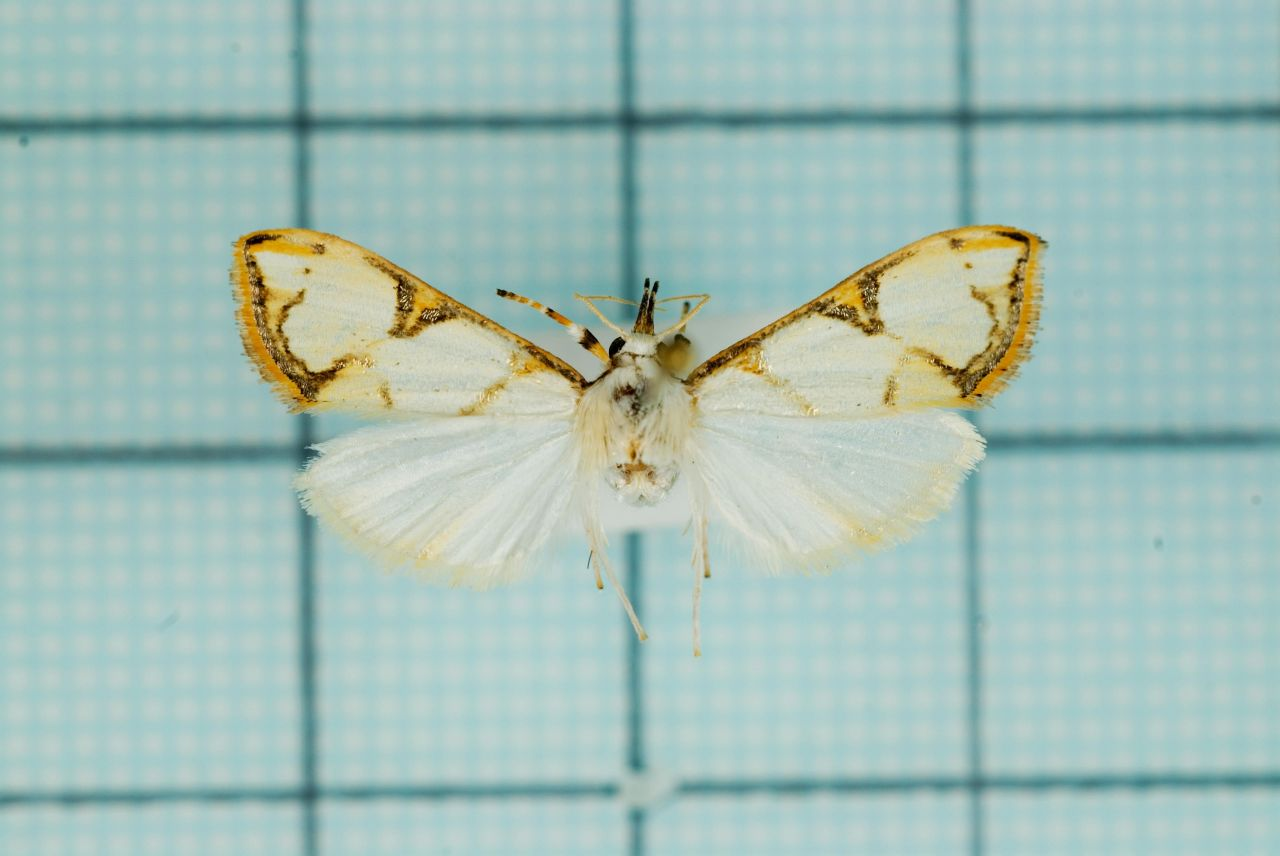
Cirrhochrista bracteolalis

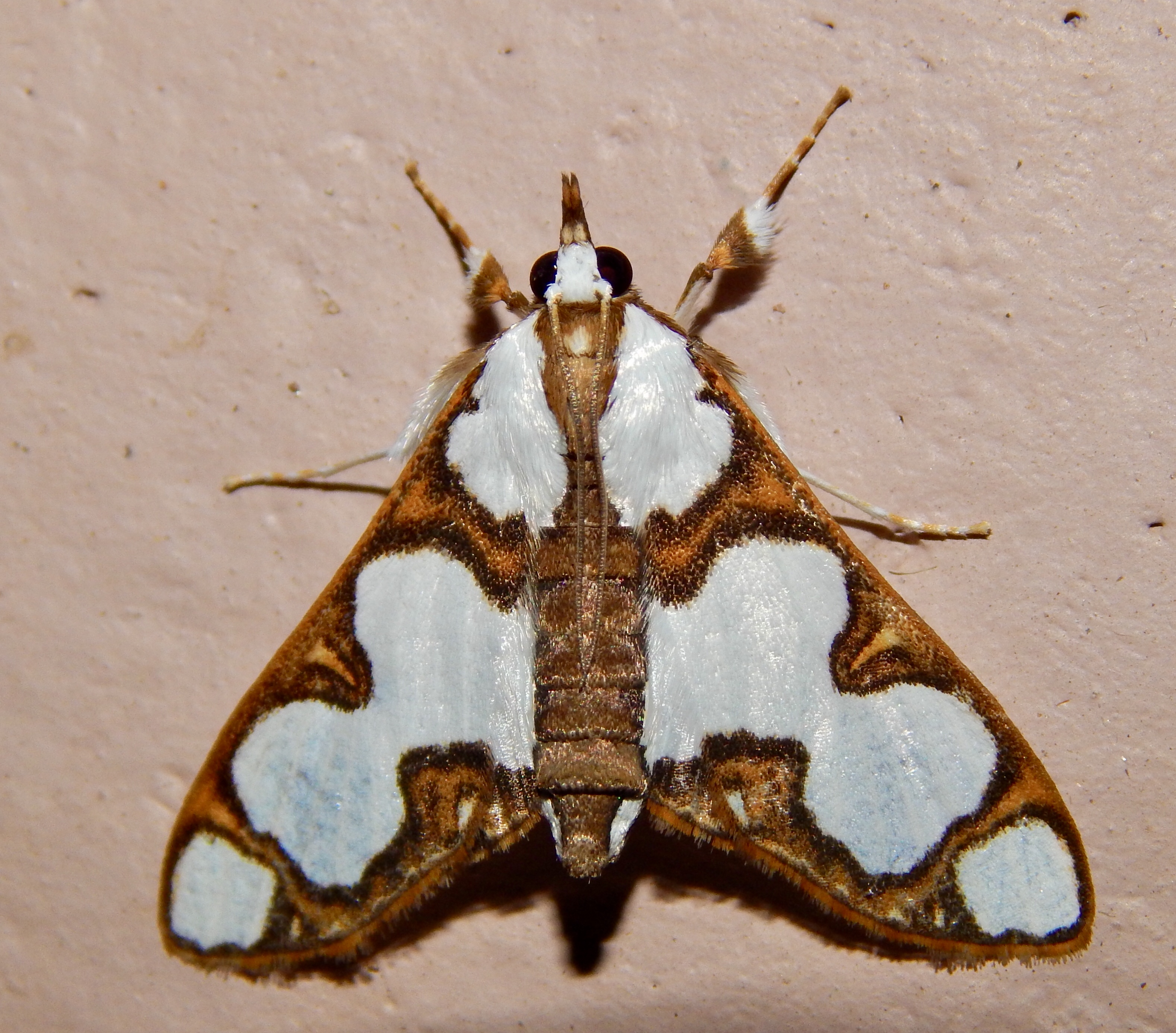
Cirrhochrista pulchellalis

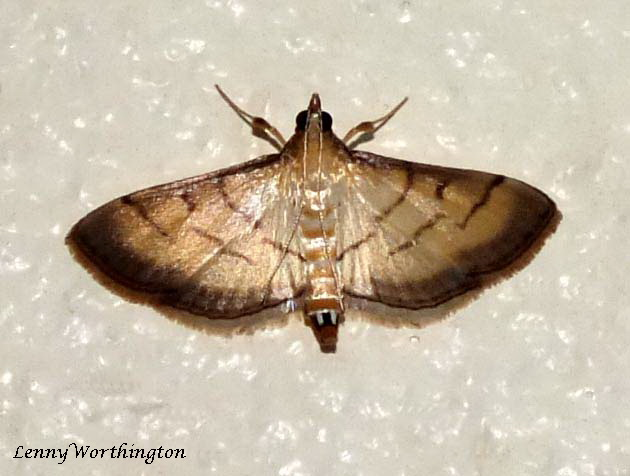
Cnaphalocrocis medinalis

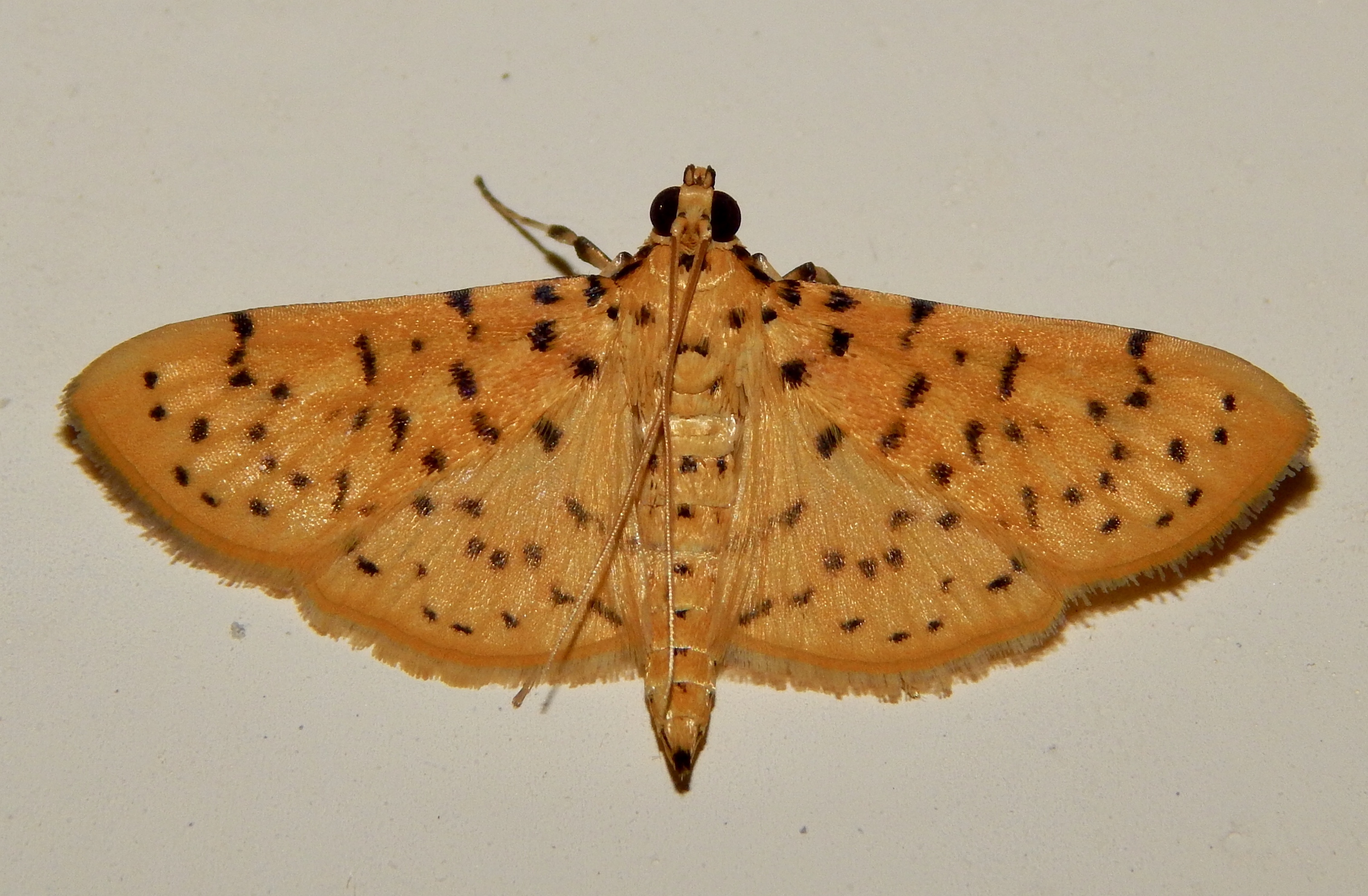
Conogethes punctiferalis

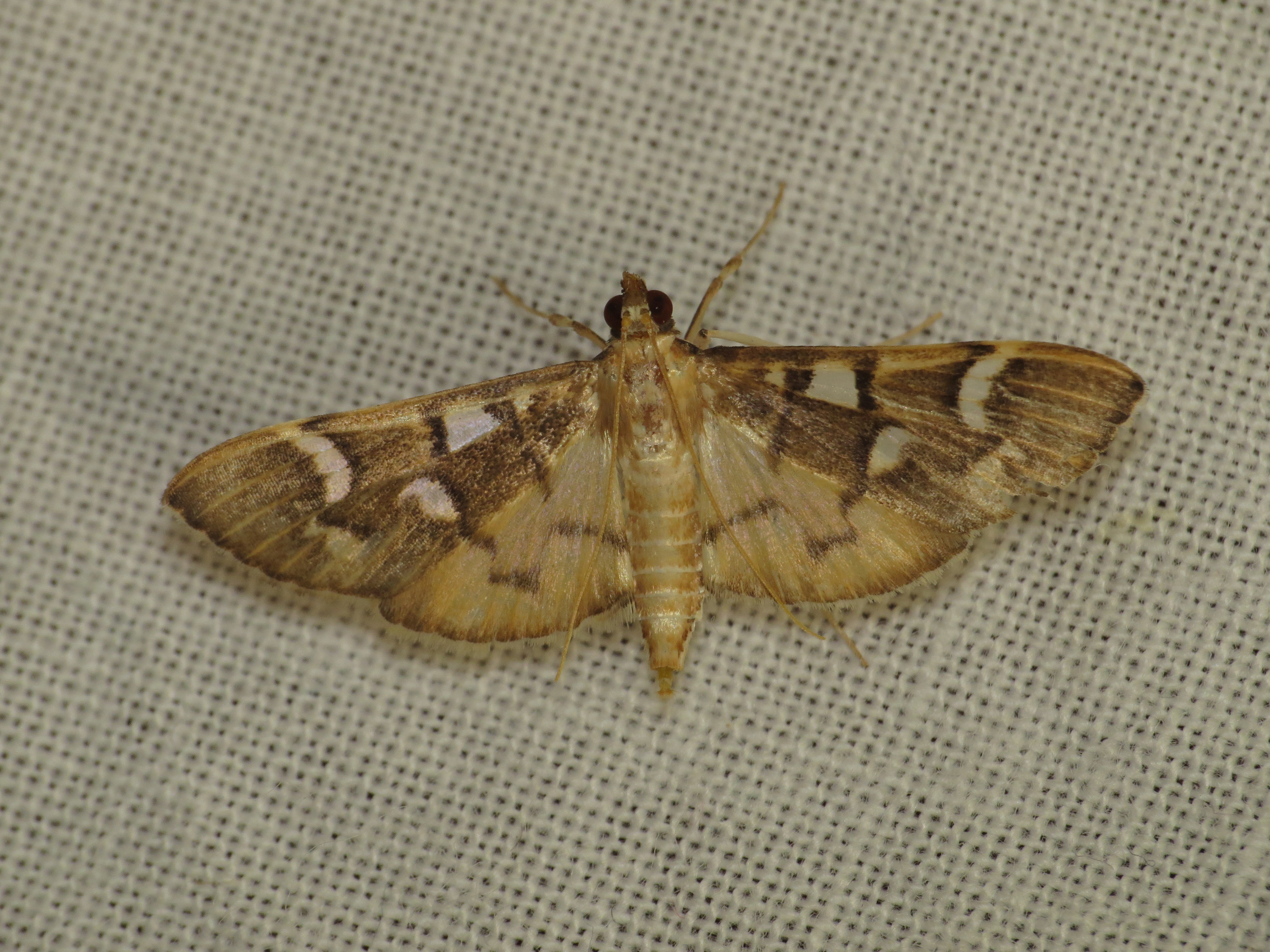
Cotachena histricalis

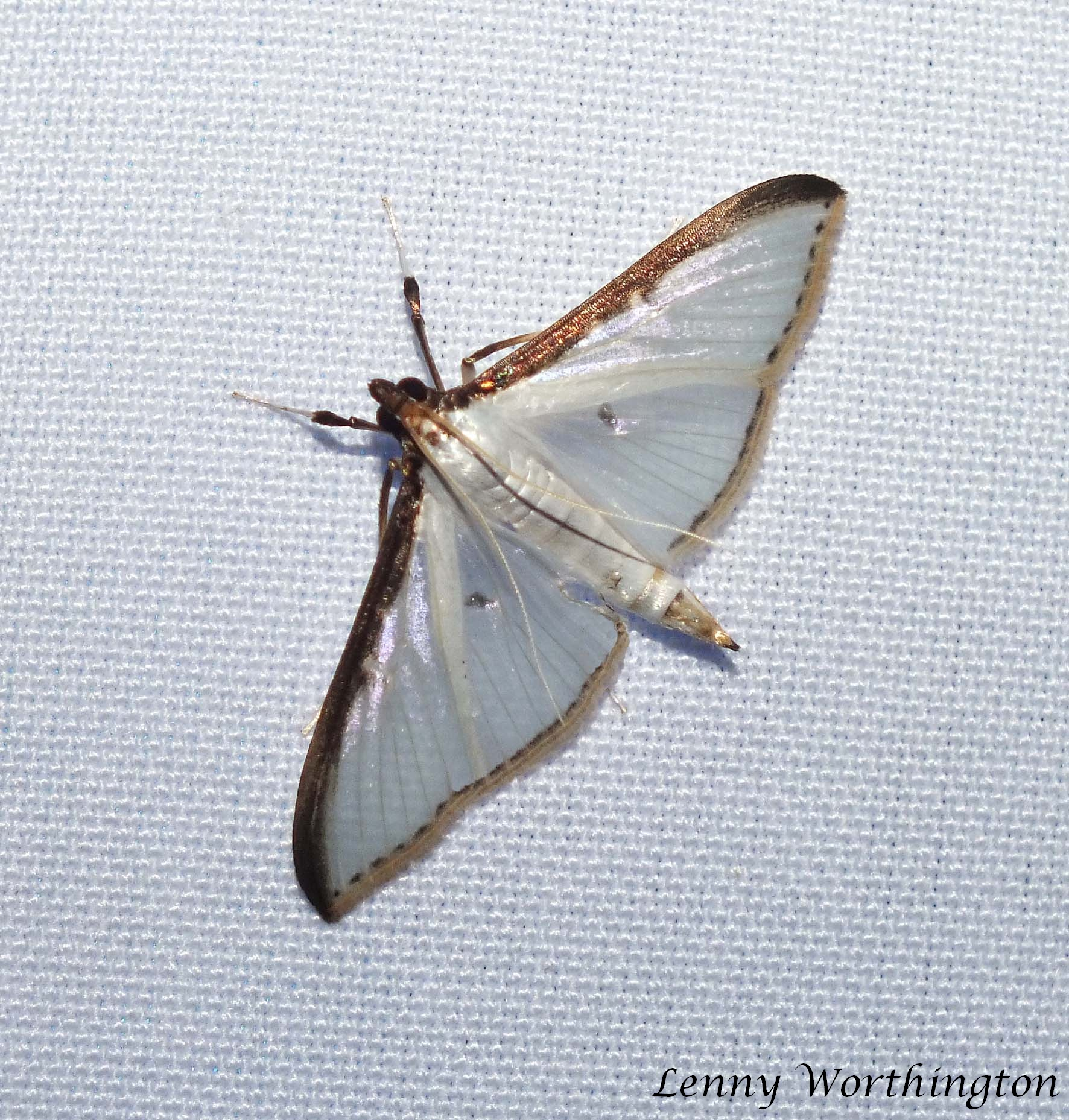
Cydalima laticostalis

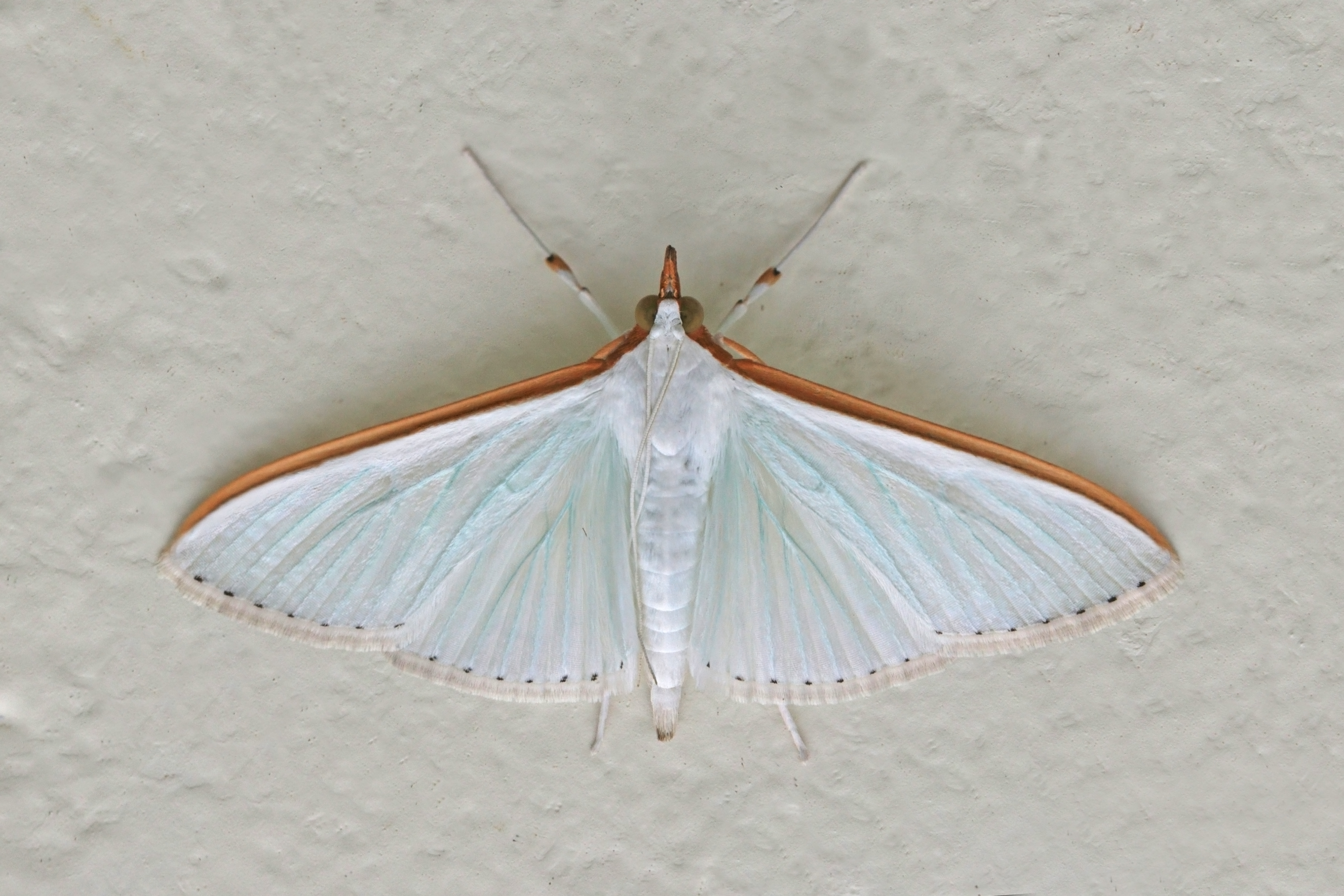
Diaphania glauculalis

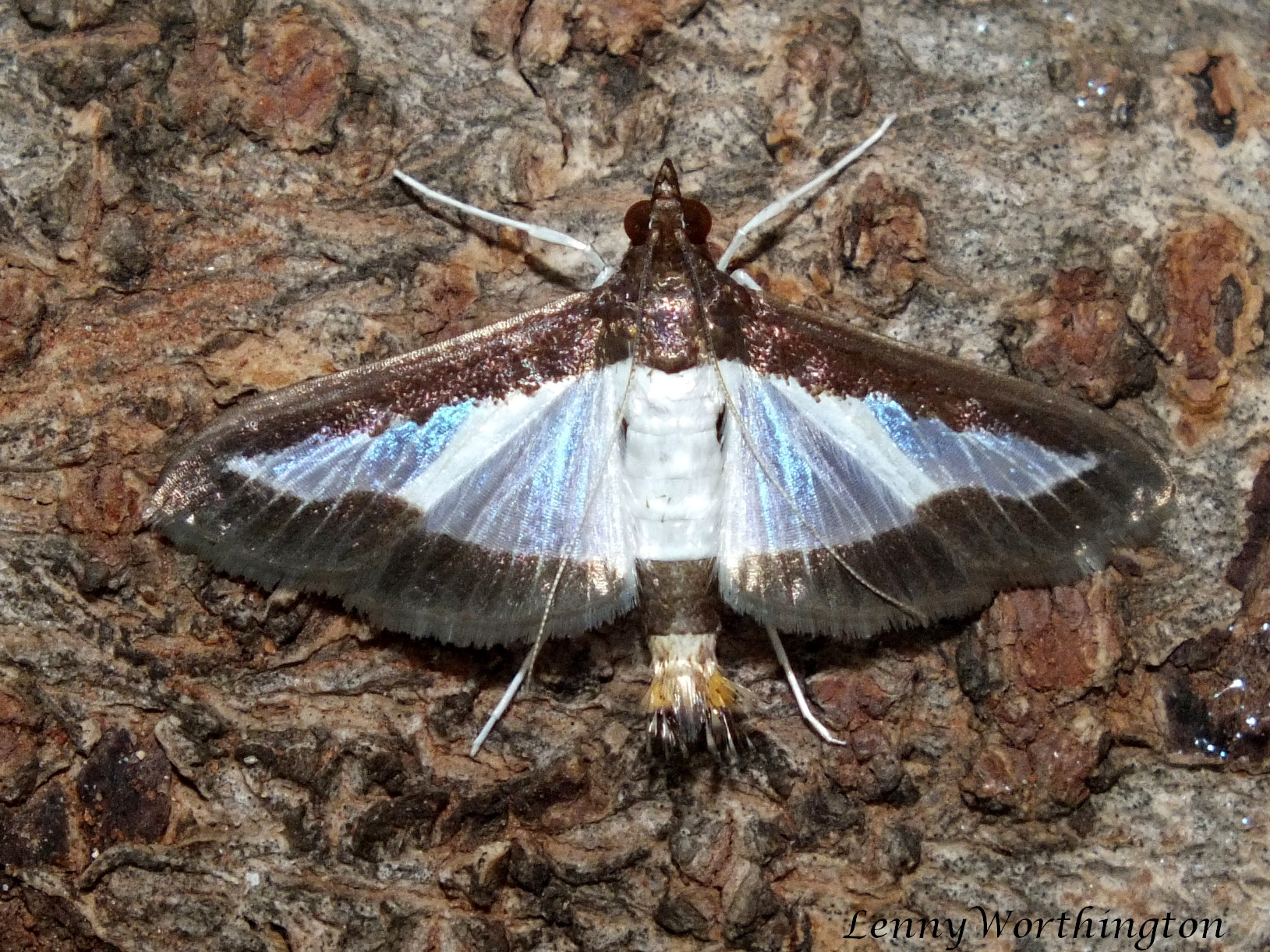
Diaphania indica

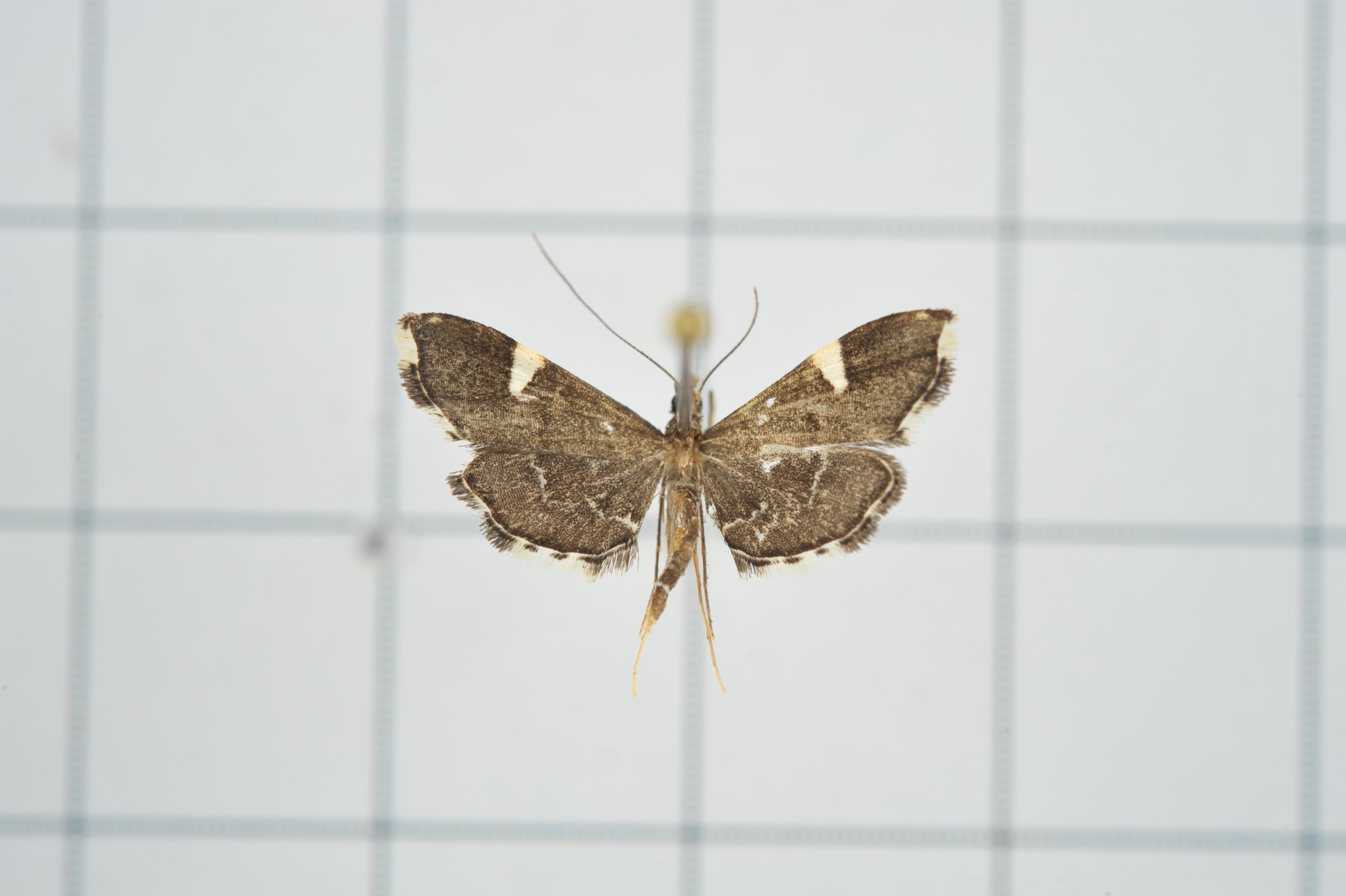
Diathrausta profundalis

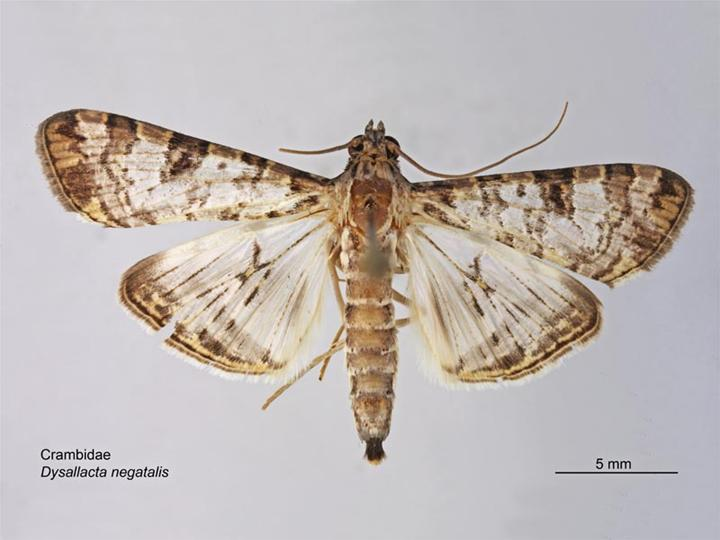
Glyphodes negatalis

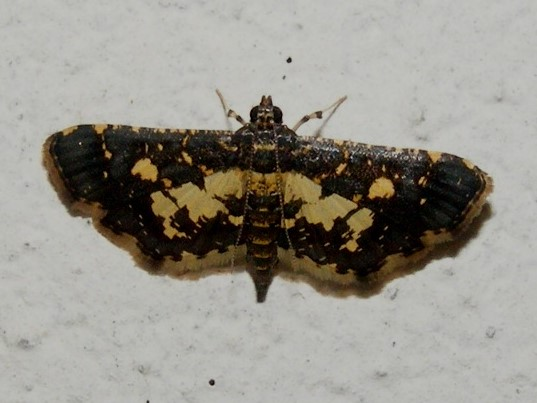
Eurrhyparodes bracteolalis

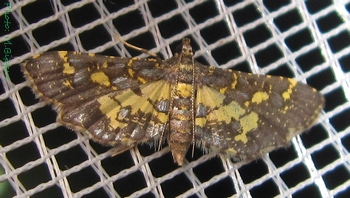
Eurrhyparodes tricoloralis

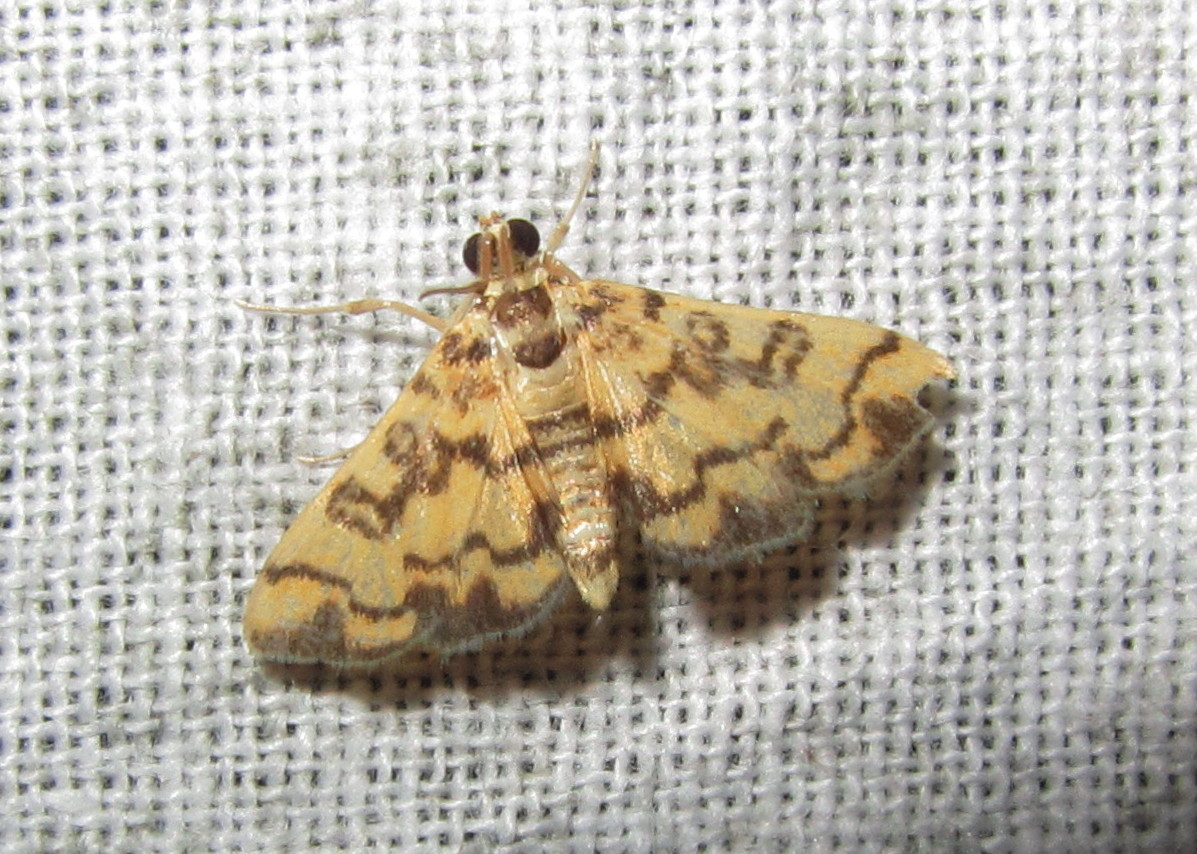
Glycythyma chrysorycta

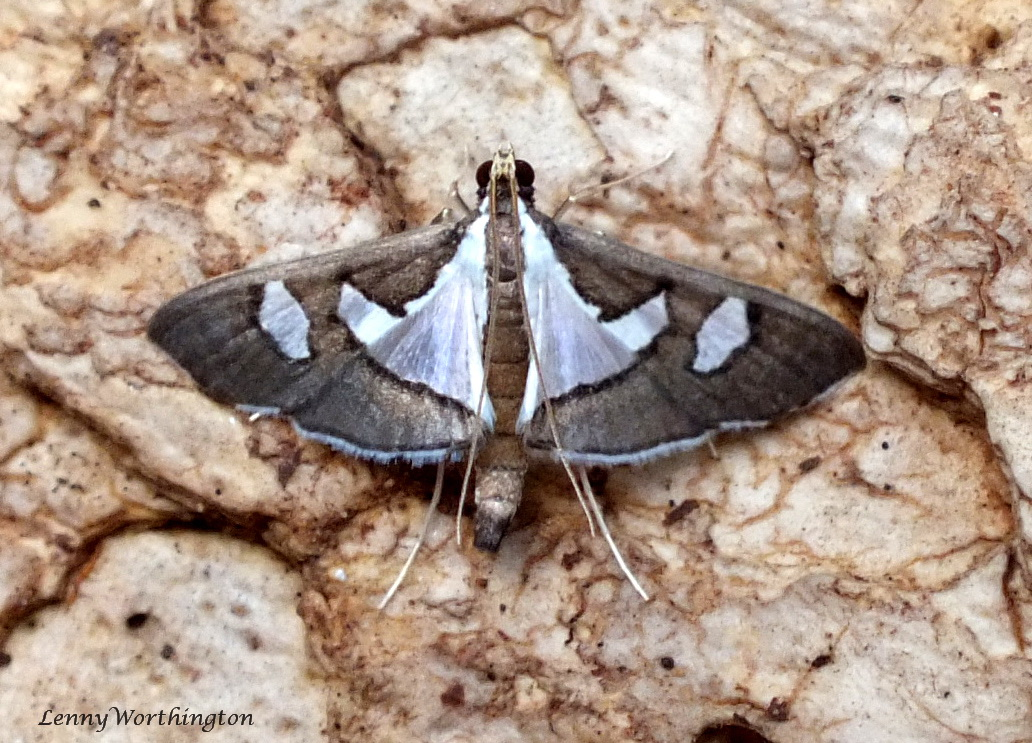
Glyphodes bicolor

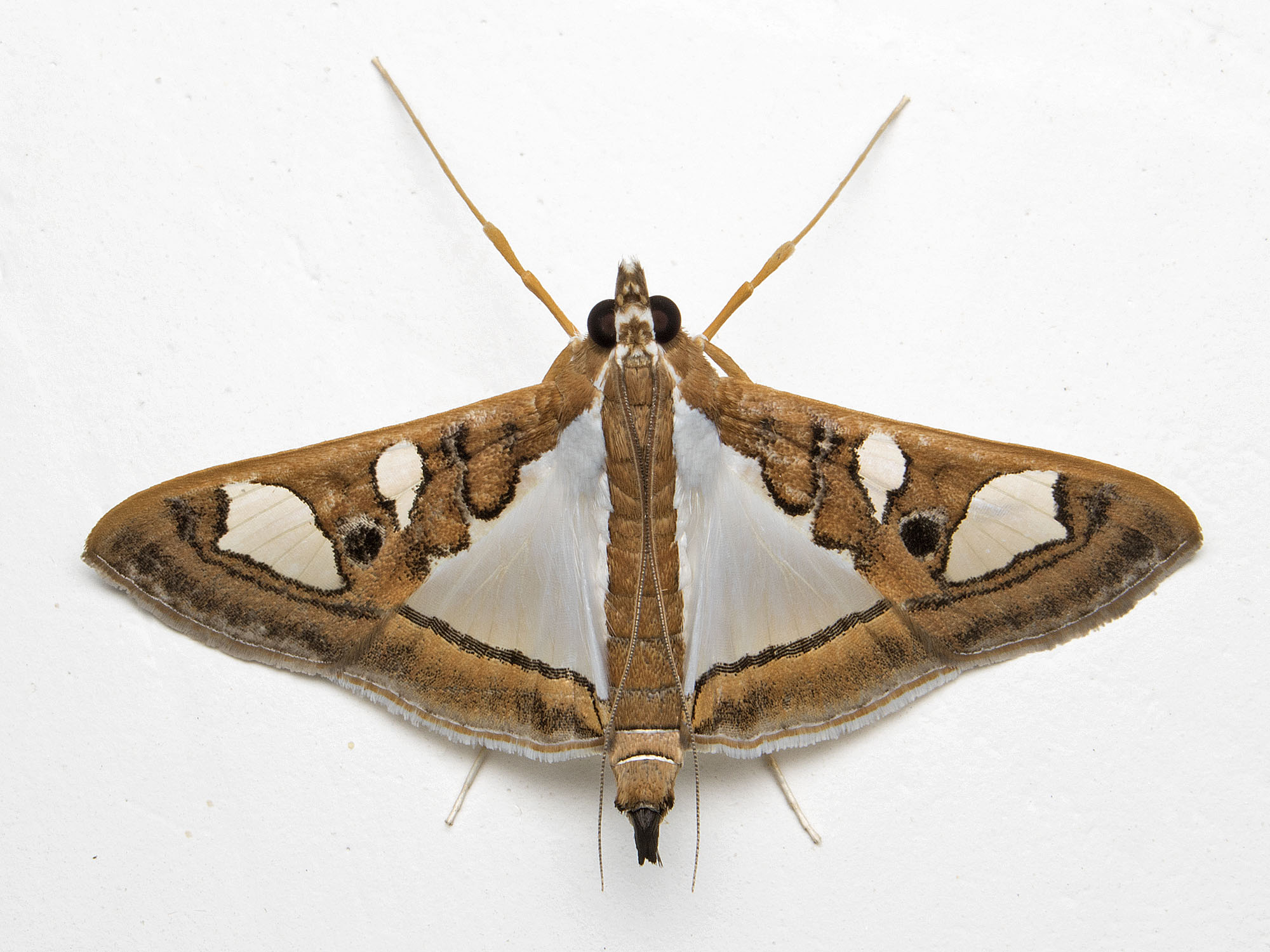
Glyphodes bivitralis

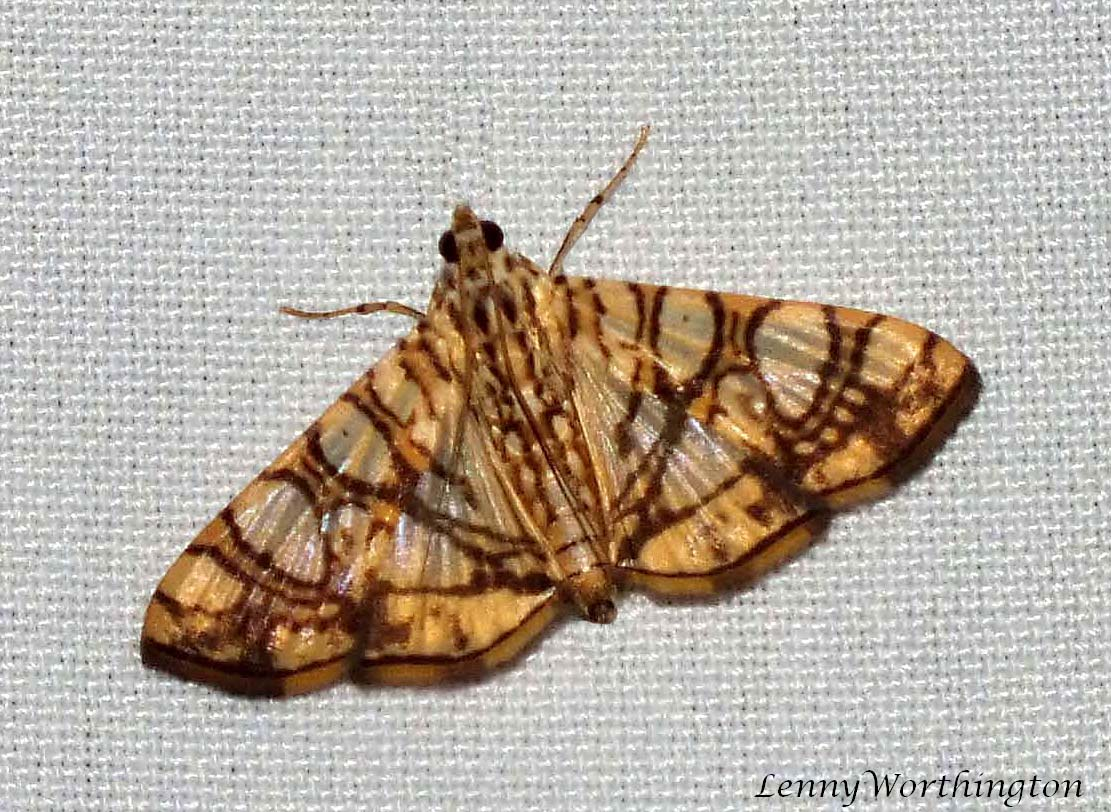
Glyphodes caesalis

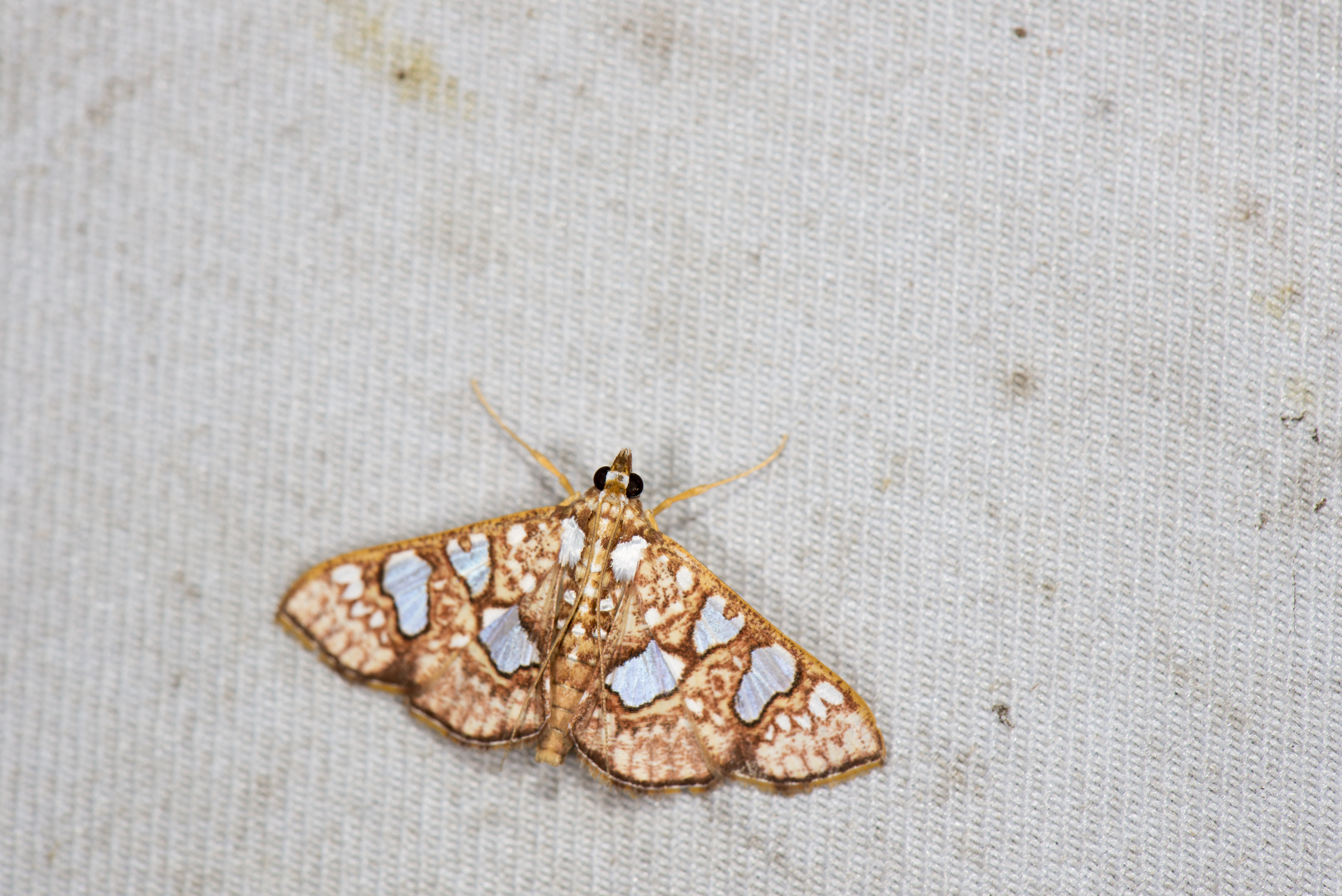
Glyphodes canthusalis

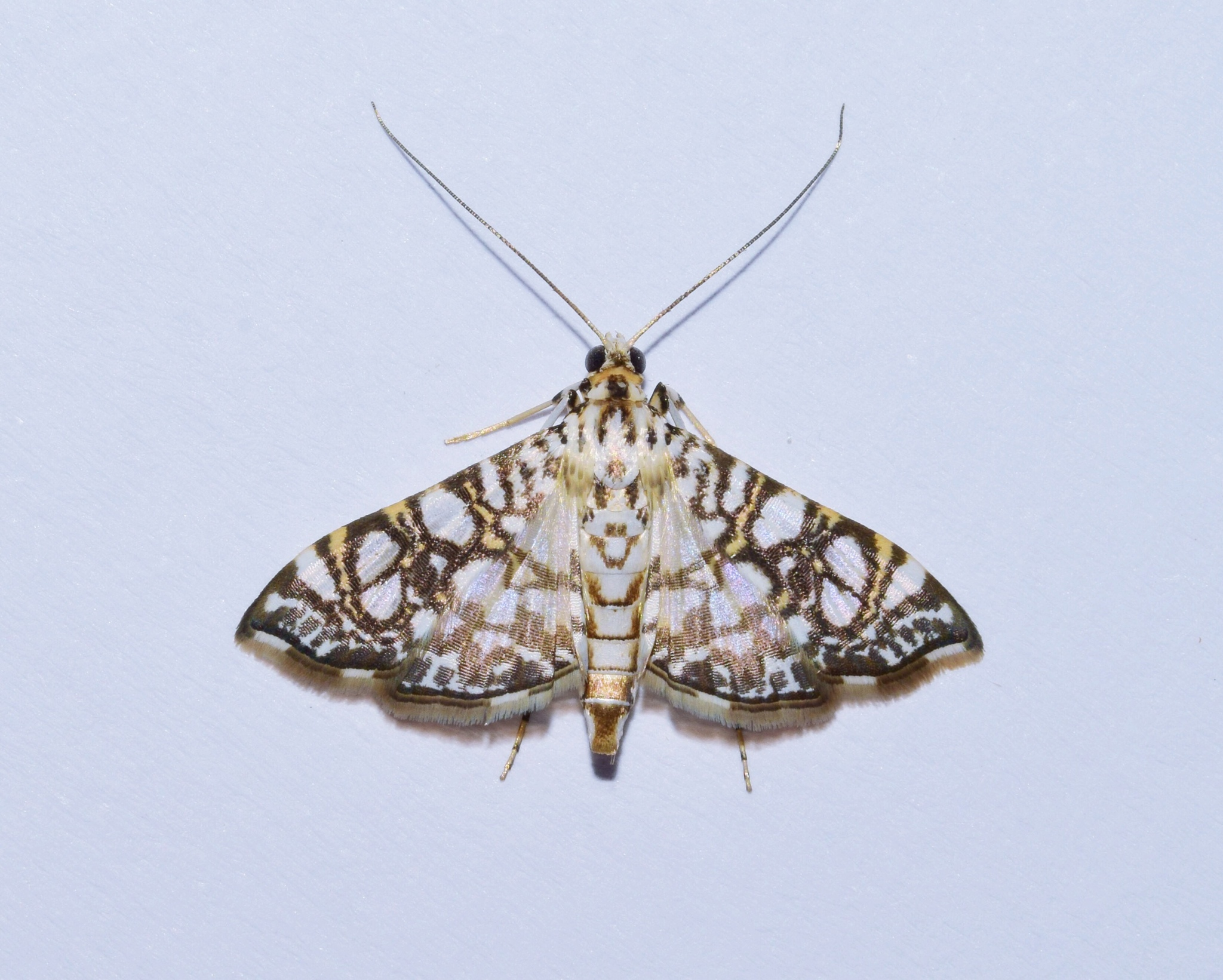
Glyphodes onychinalis

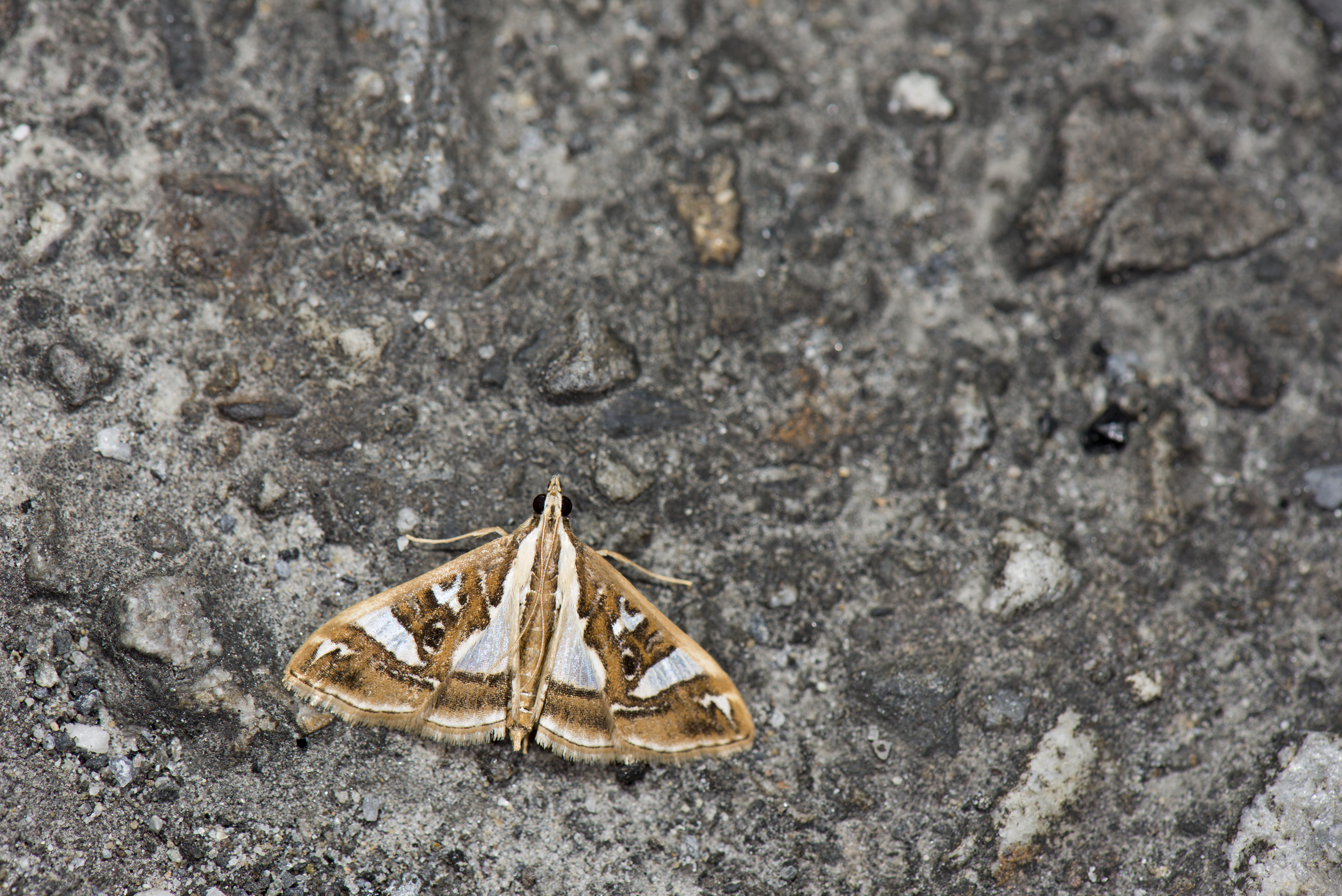
Glyphodes pyloalis

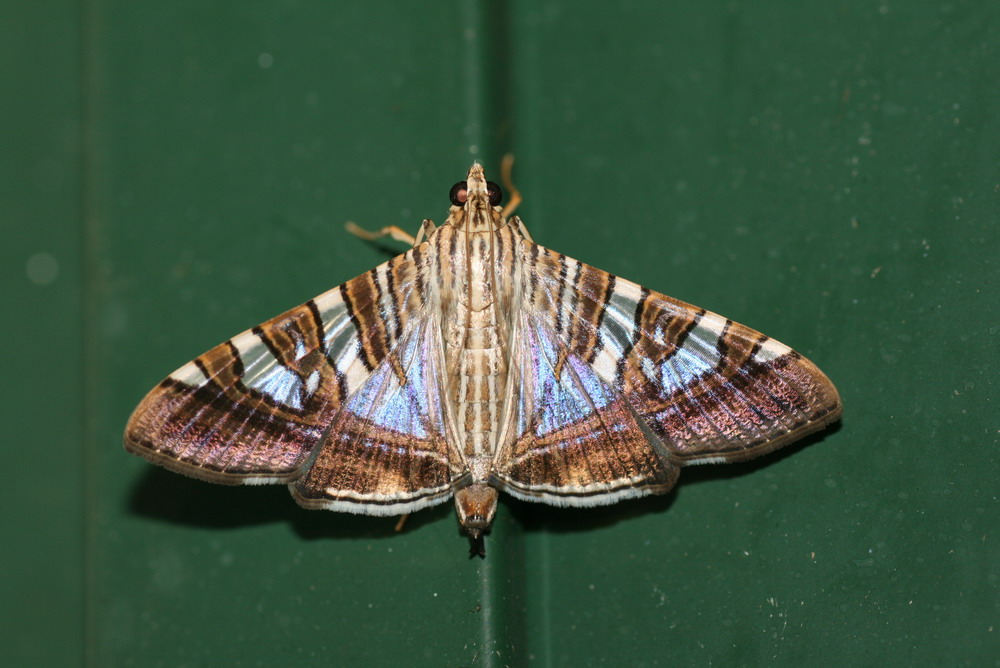
Glyphodes stolalis

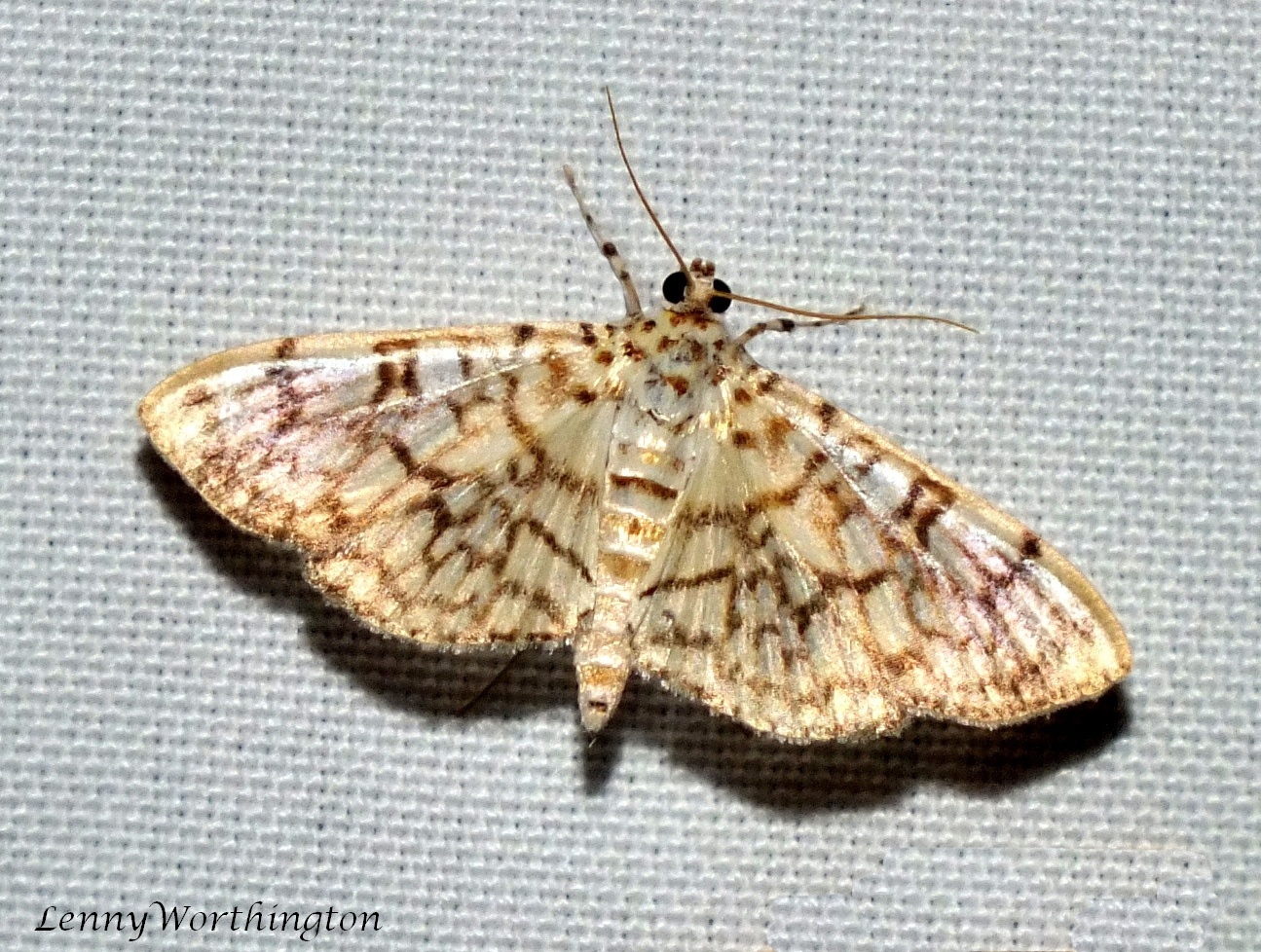
Haritalodes derogata

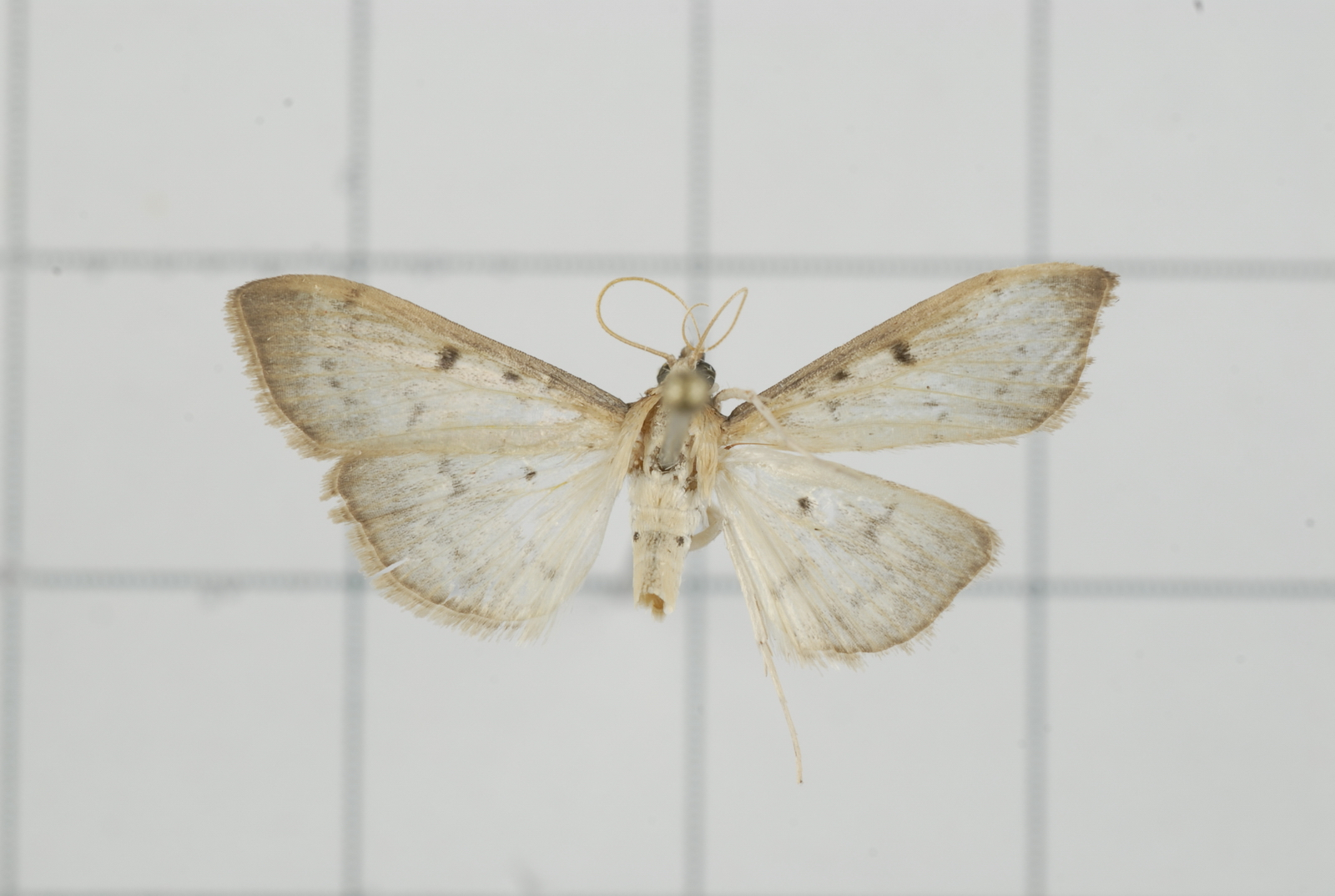
Herpetogramma basalis

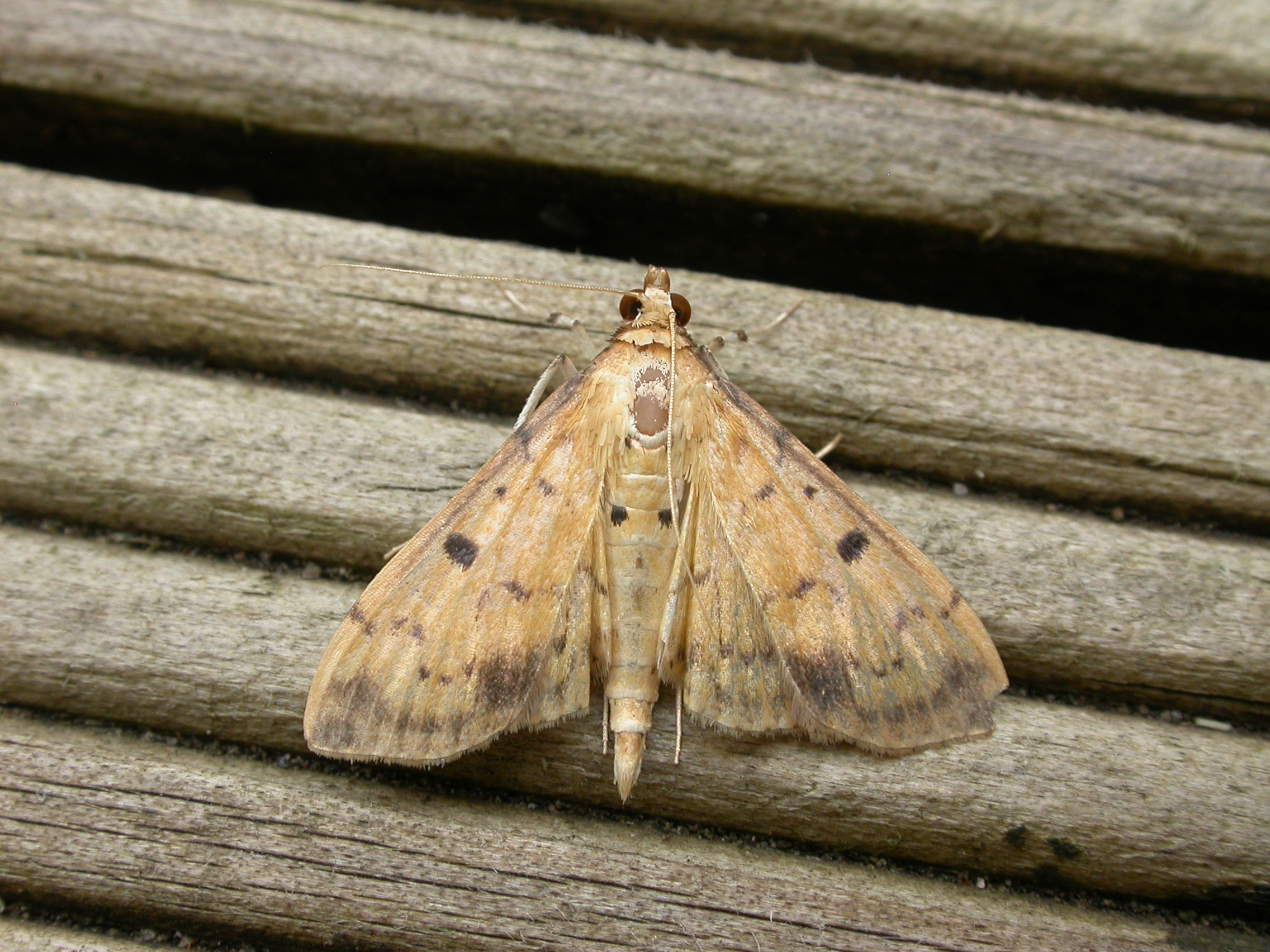
Herpetogramma cynaralis

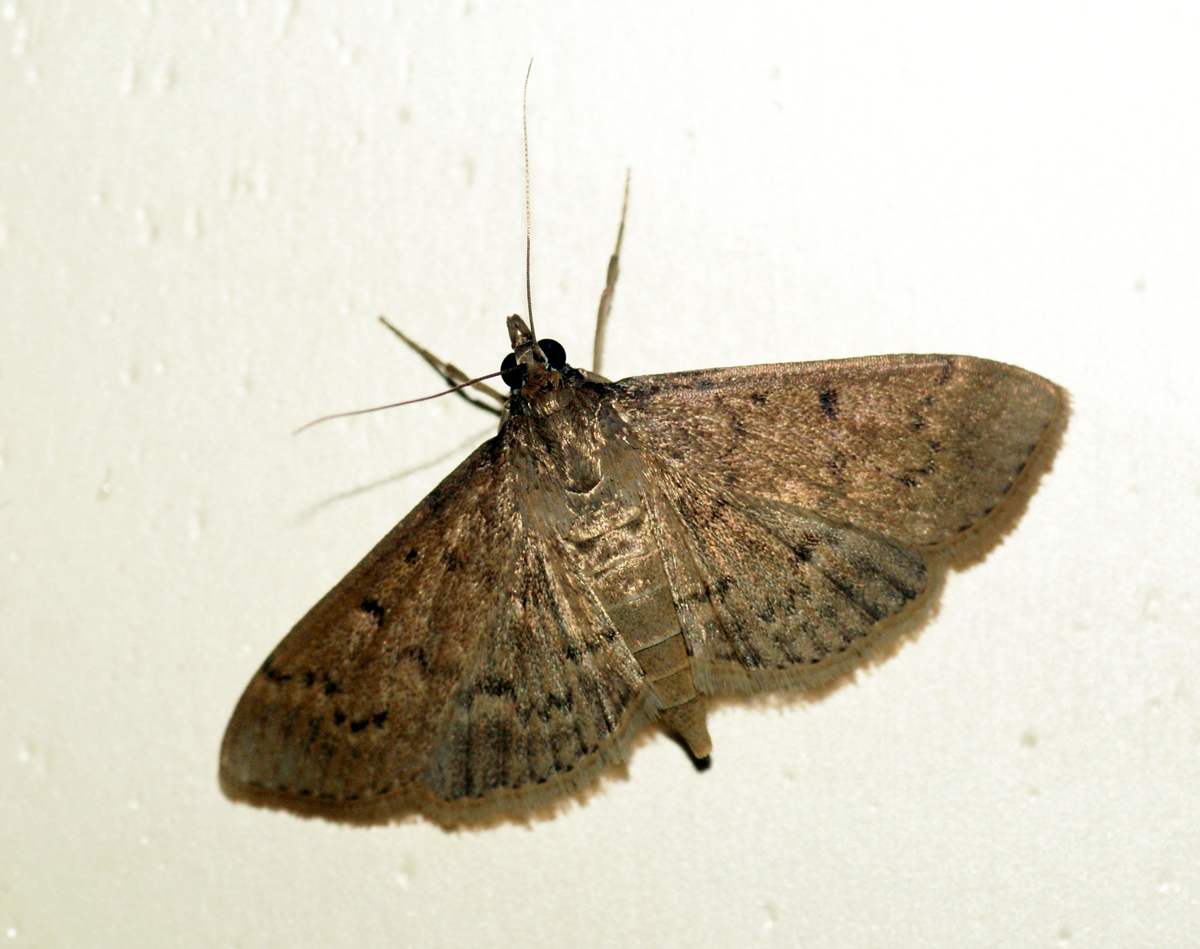
Herpetogramma licarsisalis

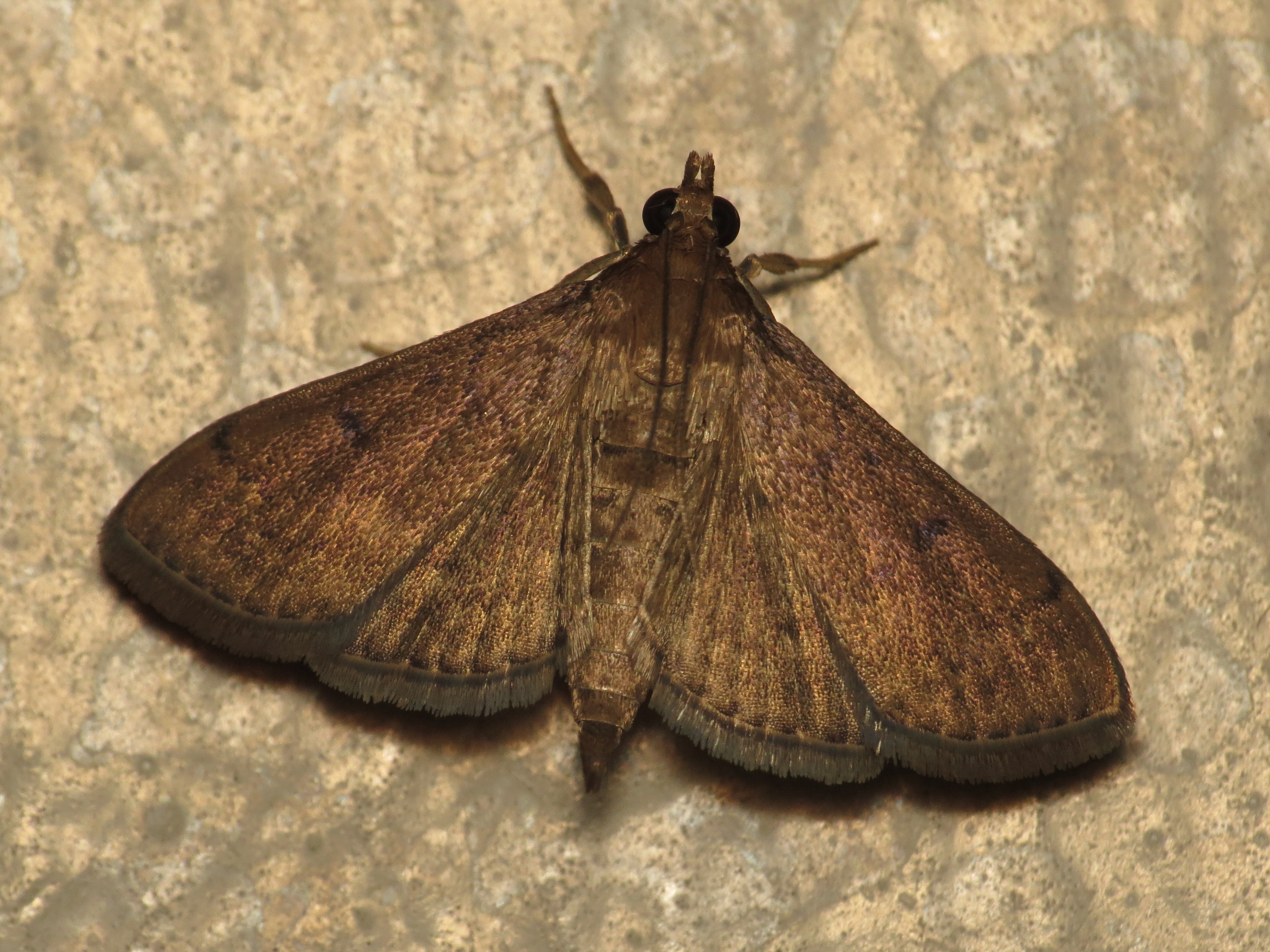
Herpetogramma phaeopteralis

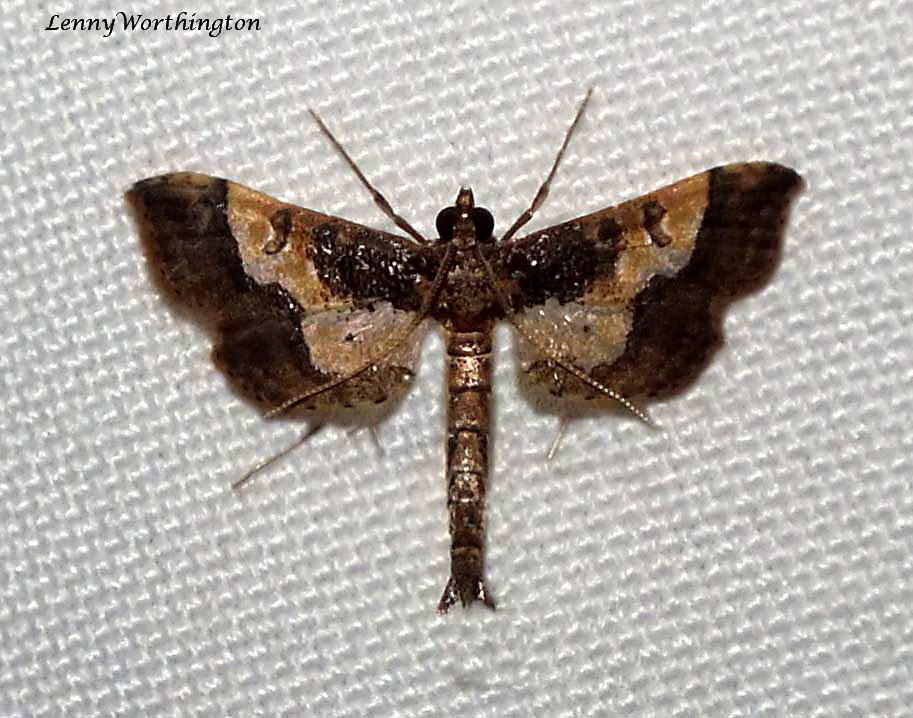
Hydriris ornatalis

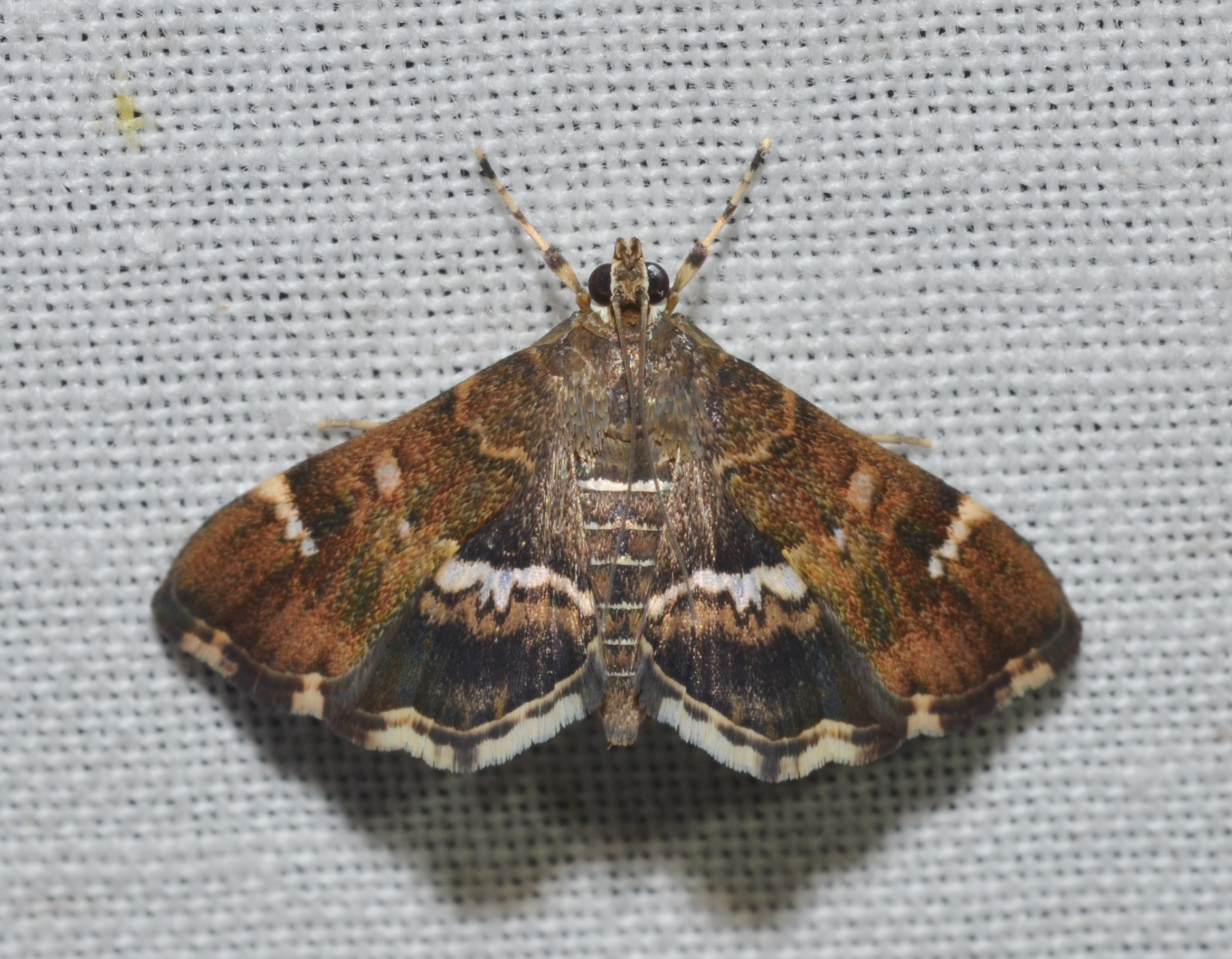
Hymenia perspectalis

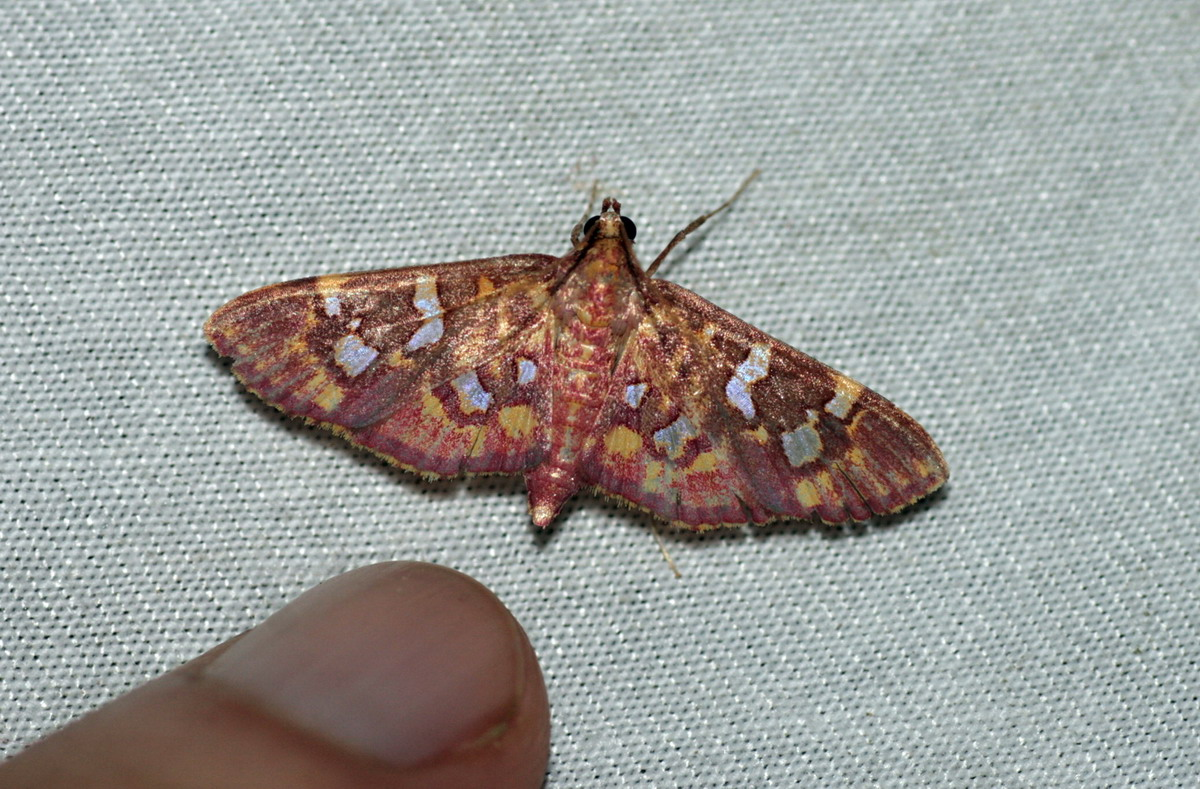
Ischnurges gratiosalis

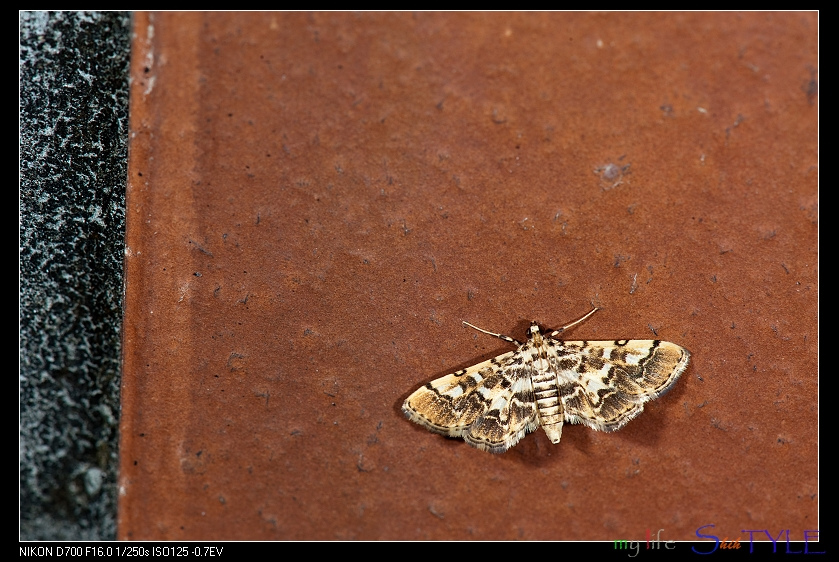
Lamprosema commixta

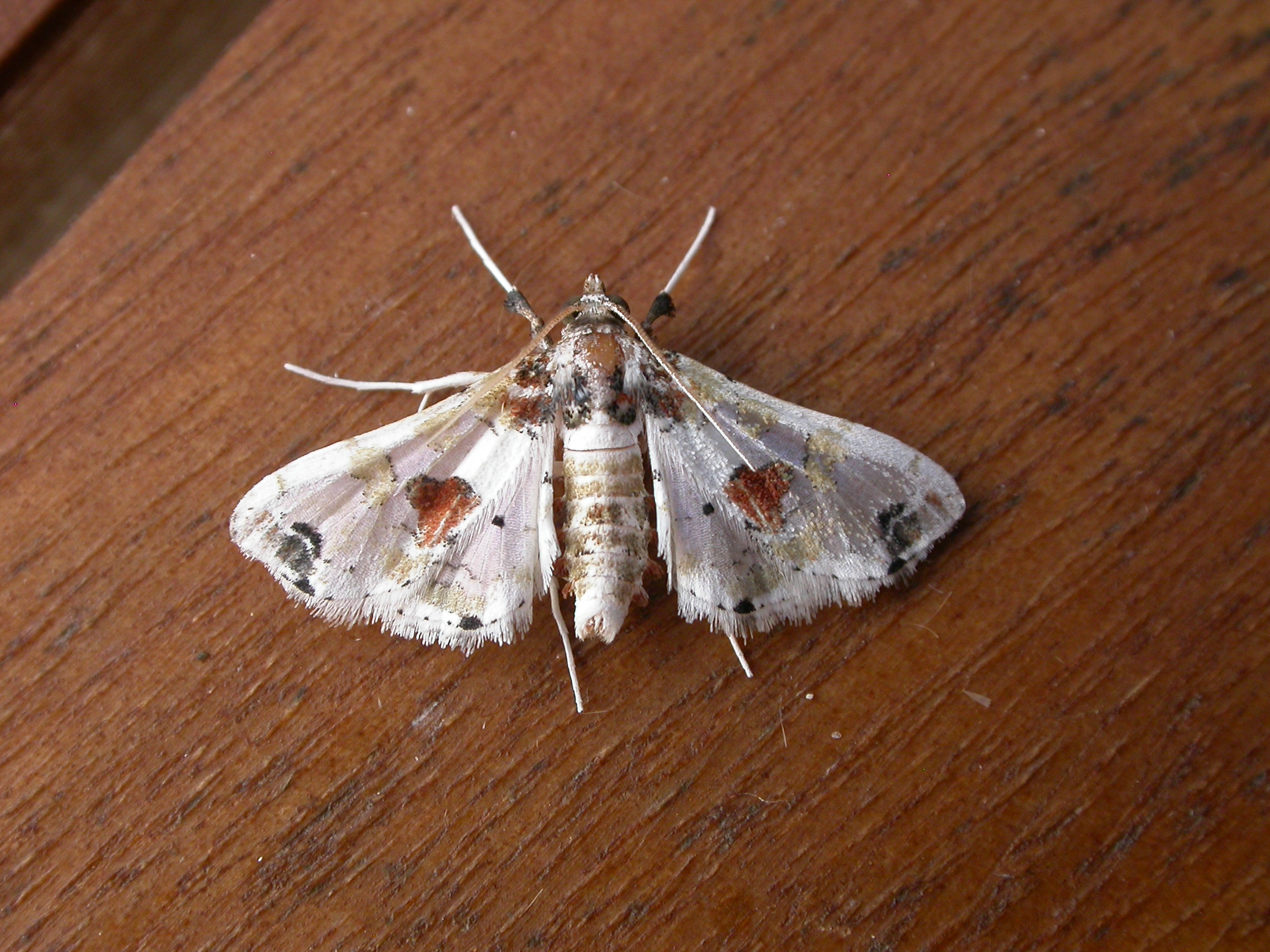
Leucinodes orbonalis

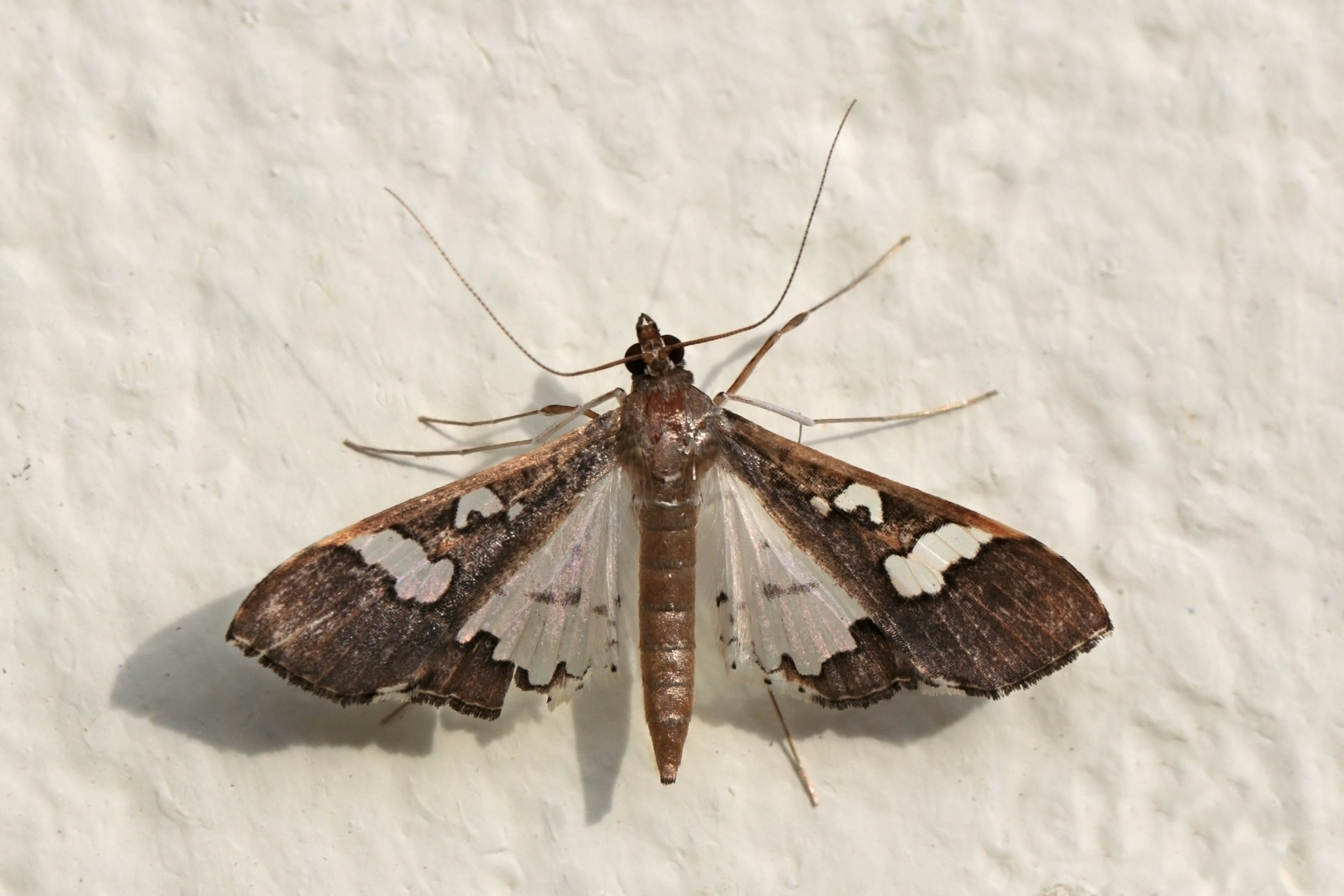
Maruca vitrata

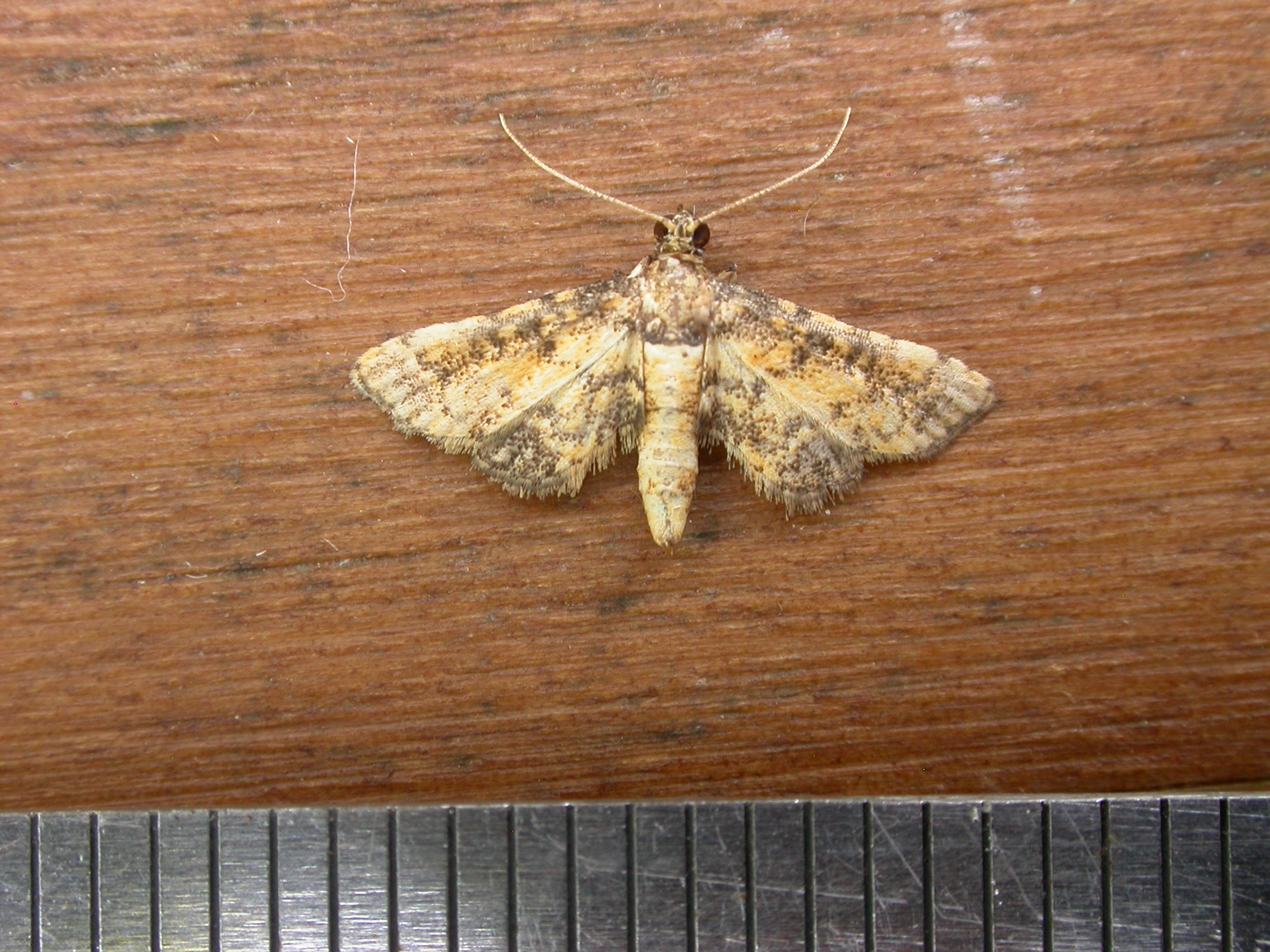
Metasia tiasalis

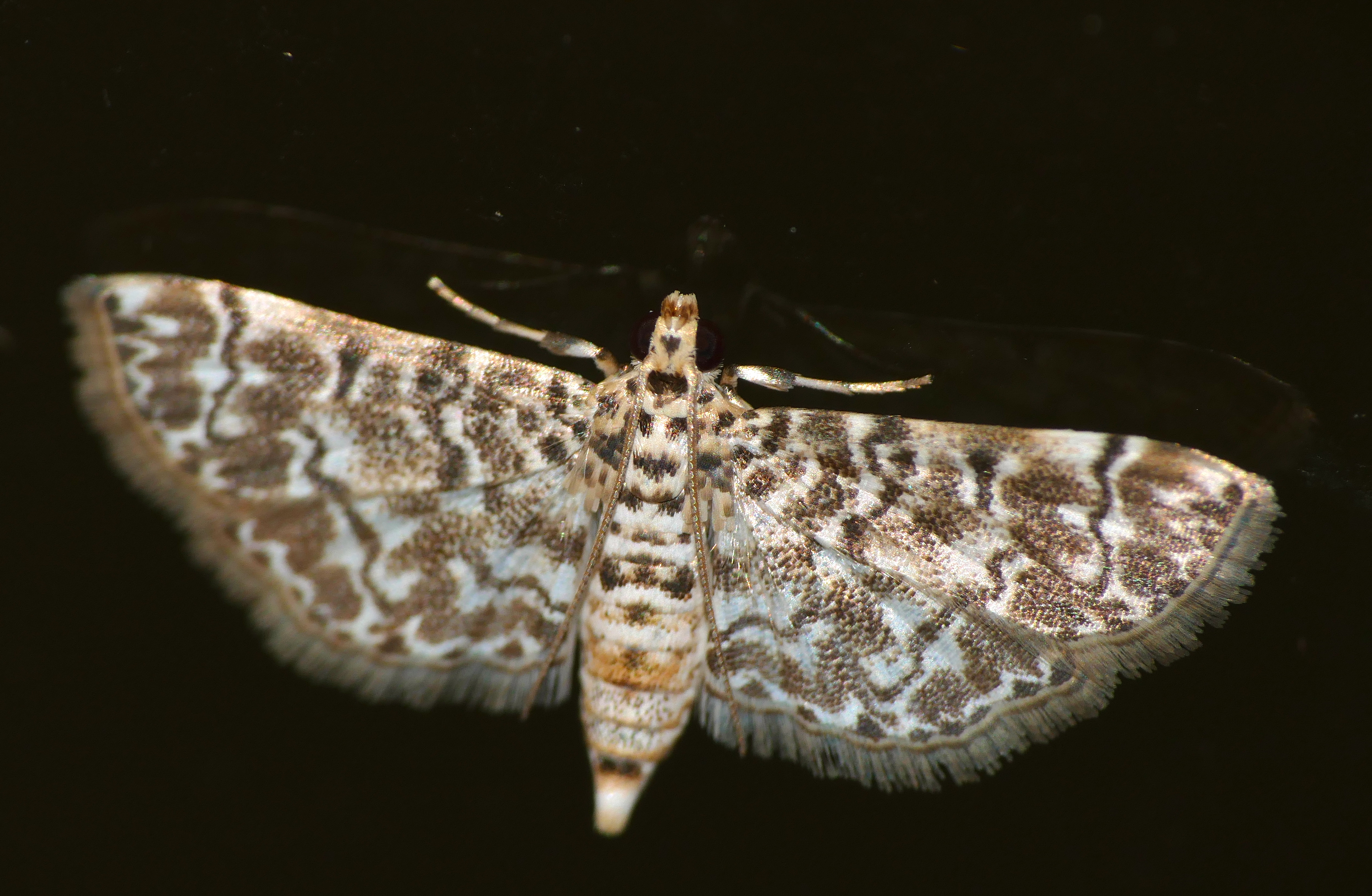
Metoeca foedalis

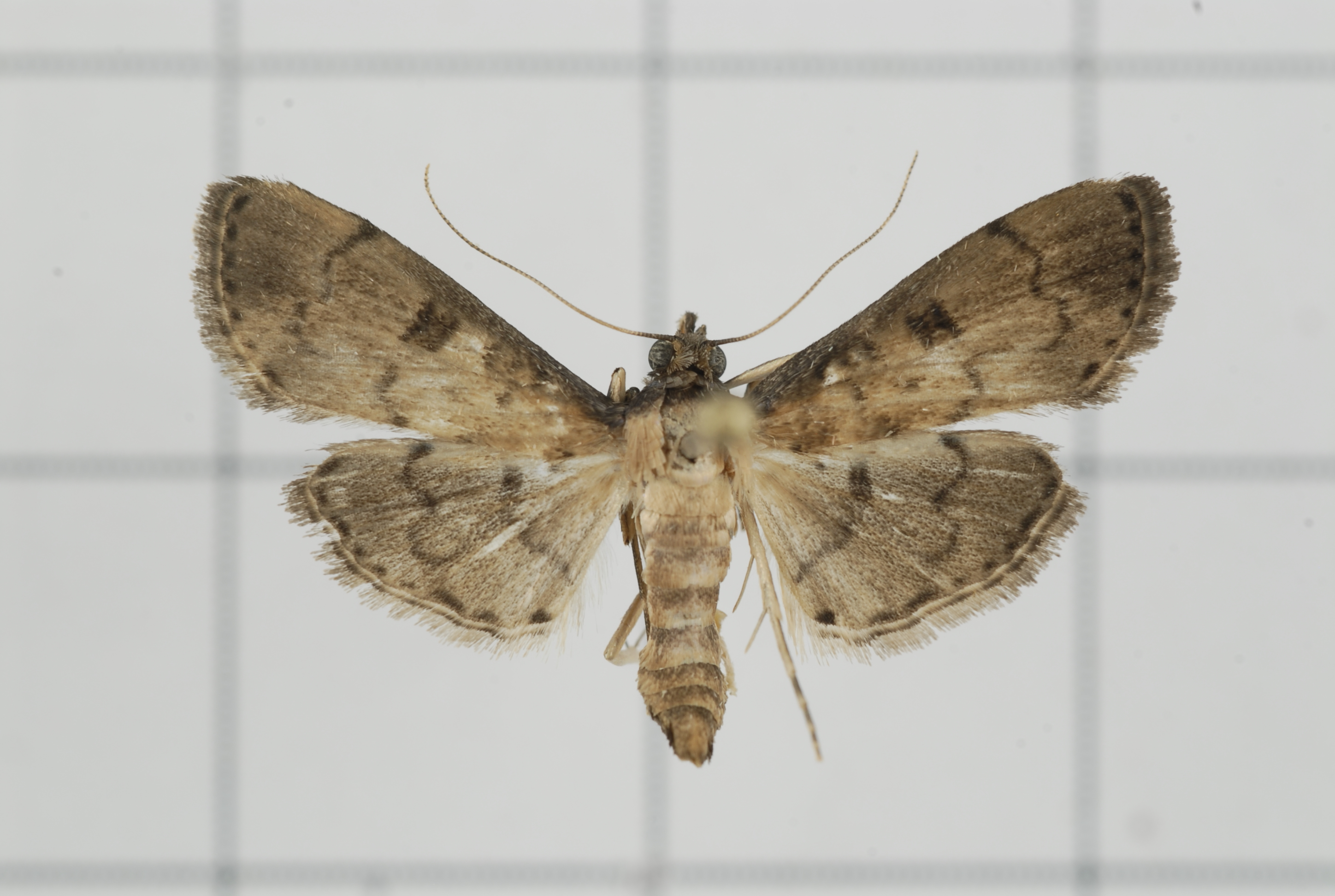
Nacoleia charesalis

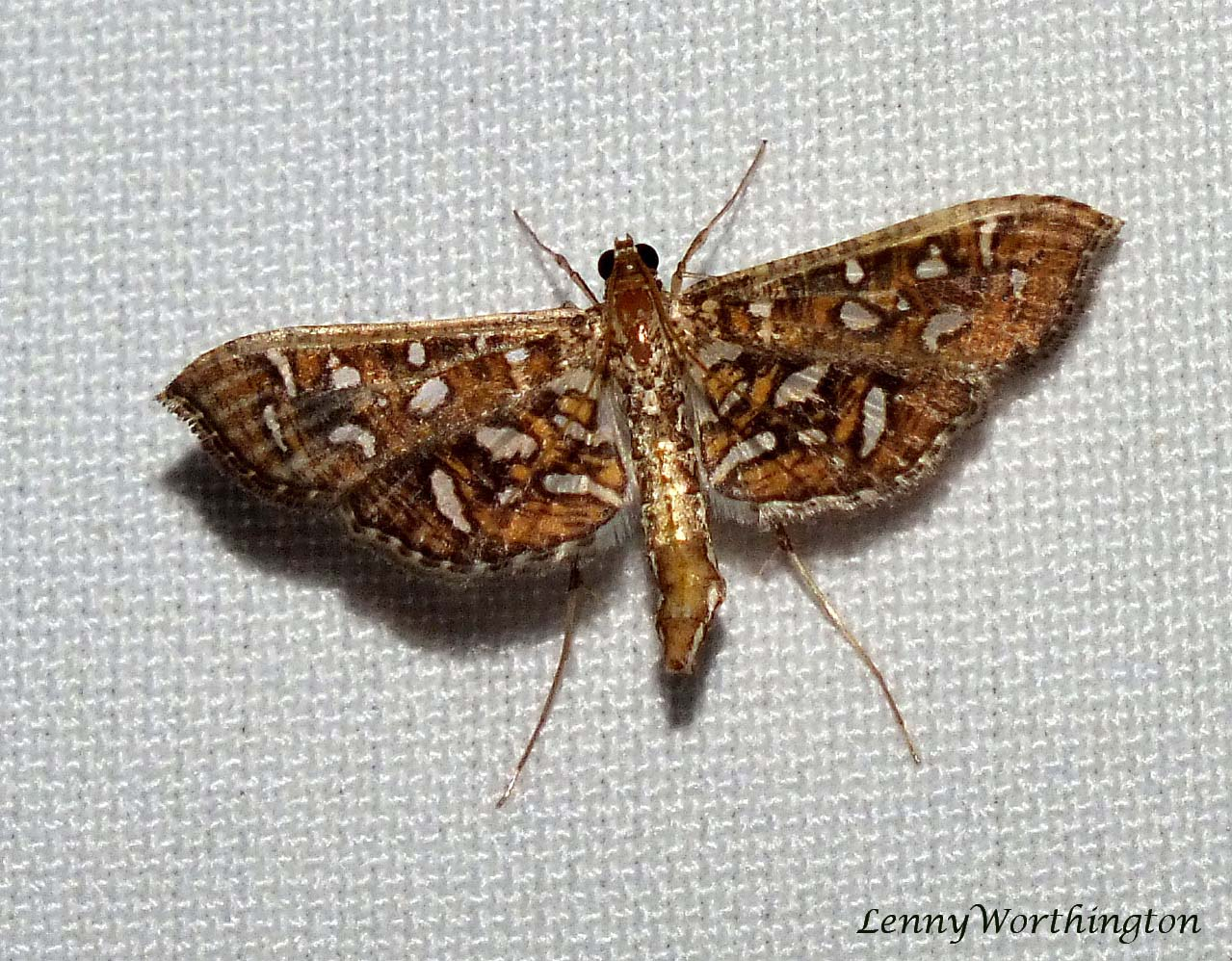
Nausinoe geometralis

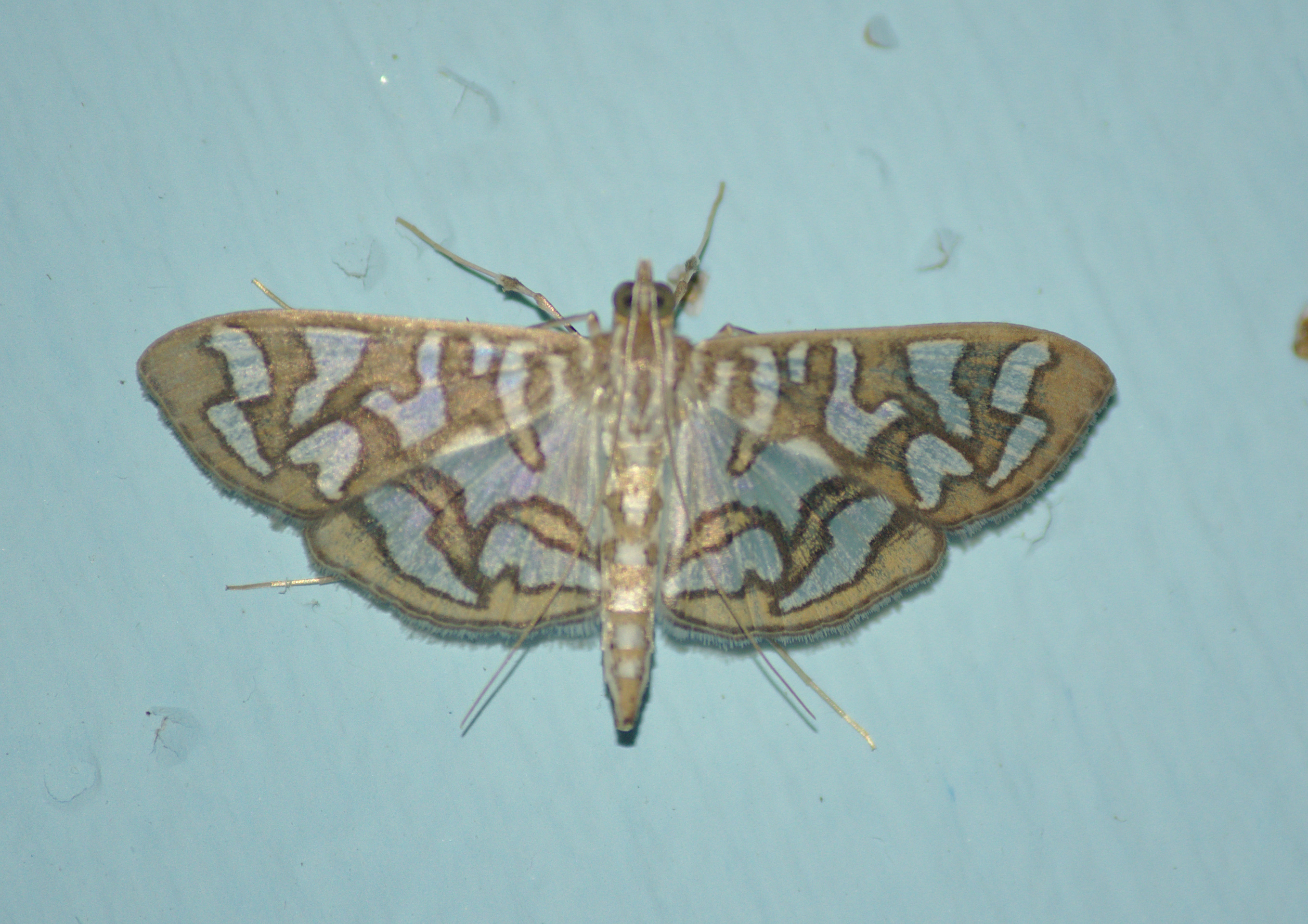
Nausinoe perspectata

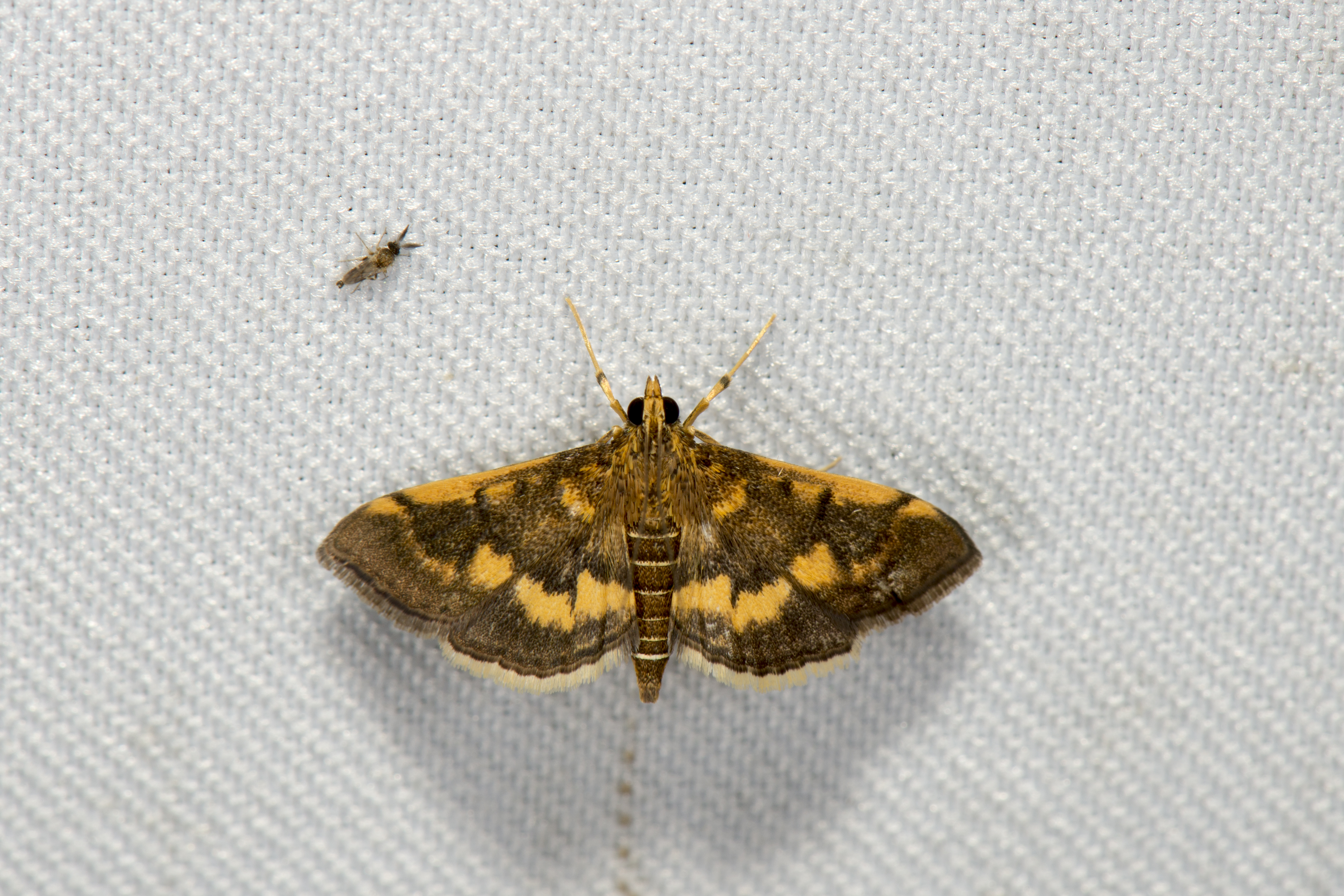
Omiodes diemenalis

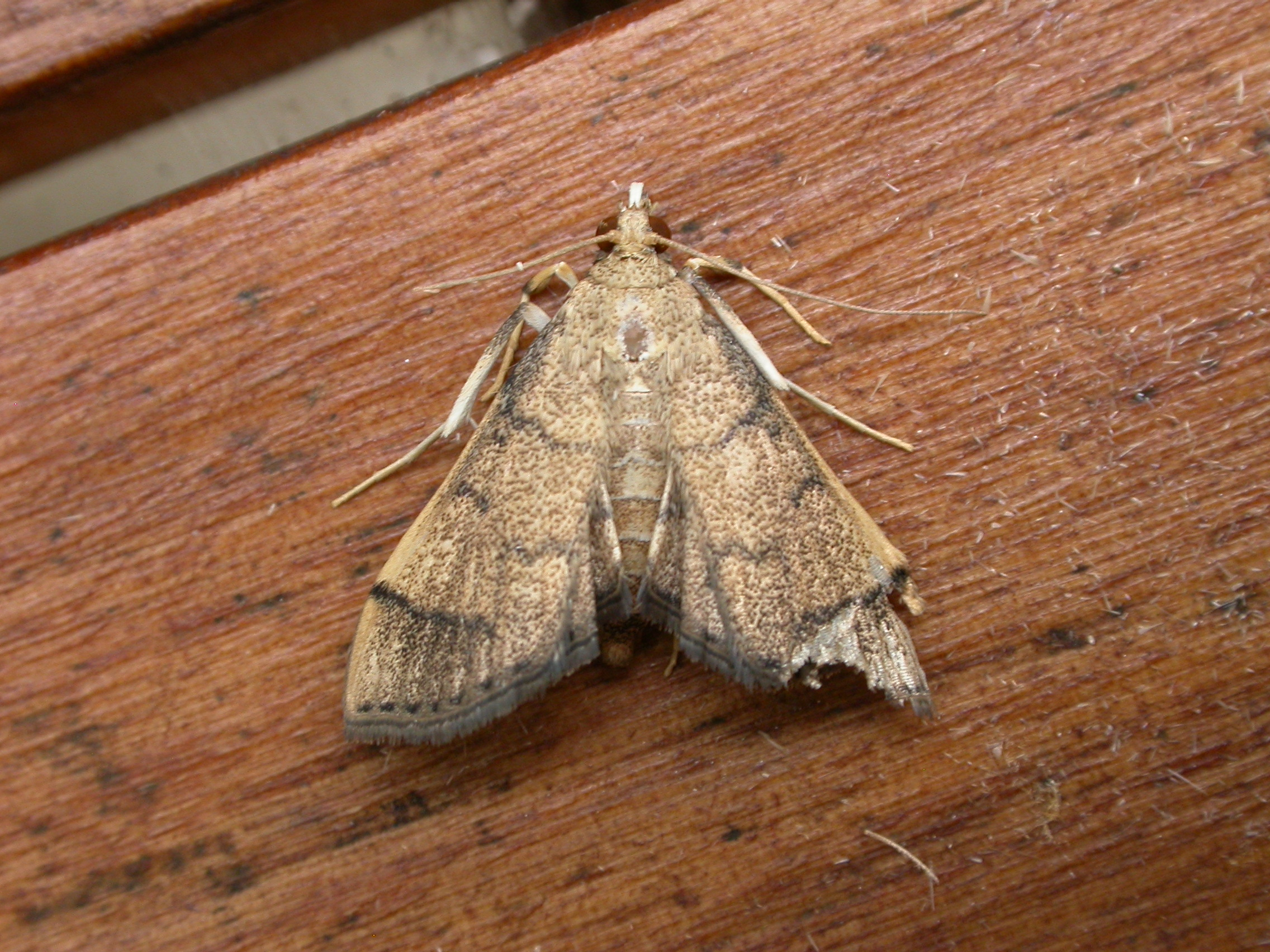
Omiodes indicata

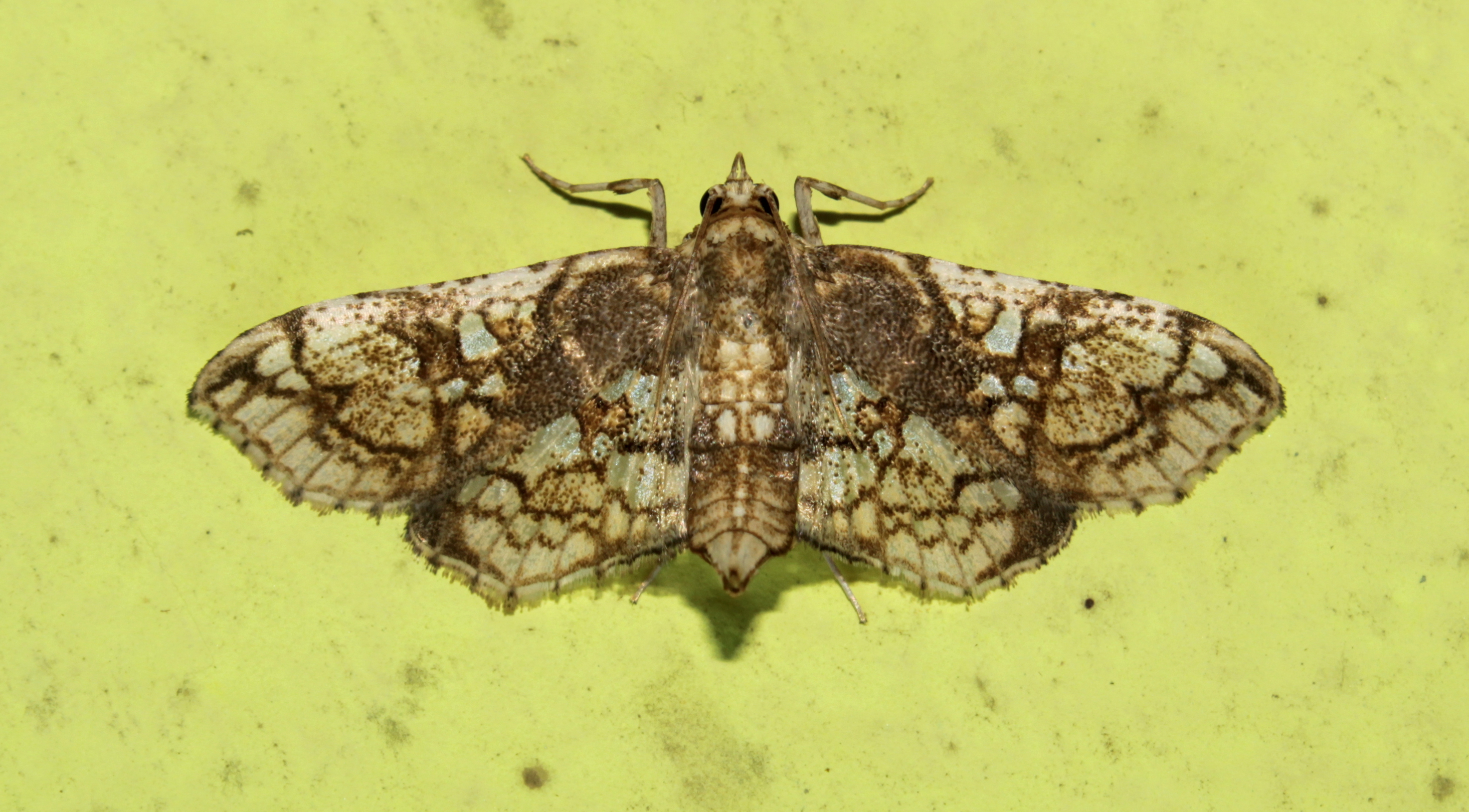
Omphisa anastomosalis

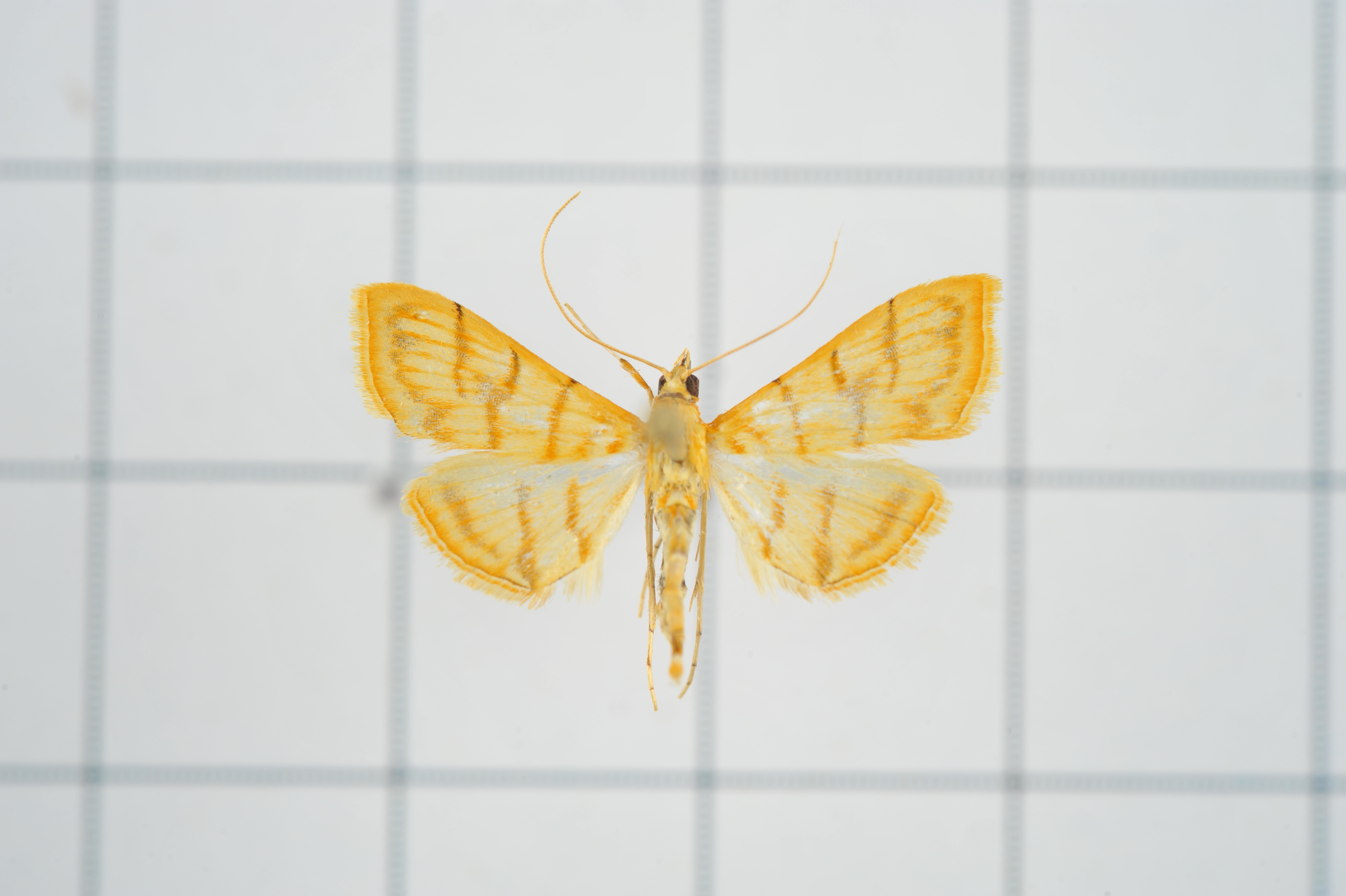
Pagyda botydalis

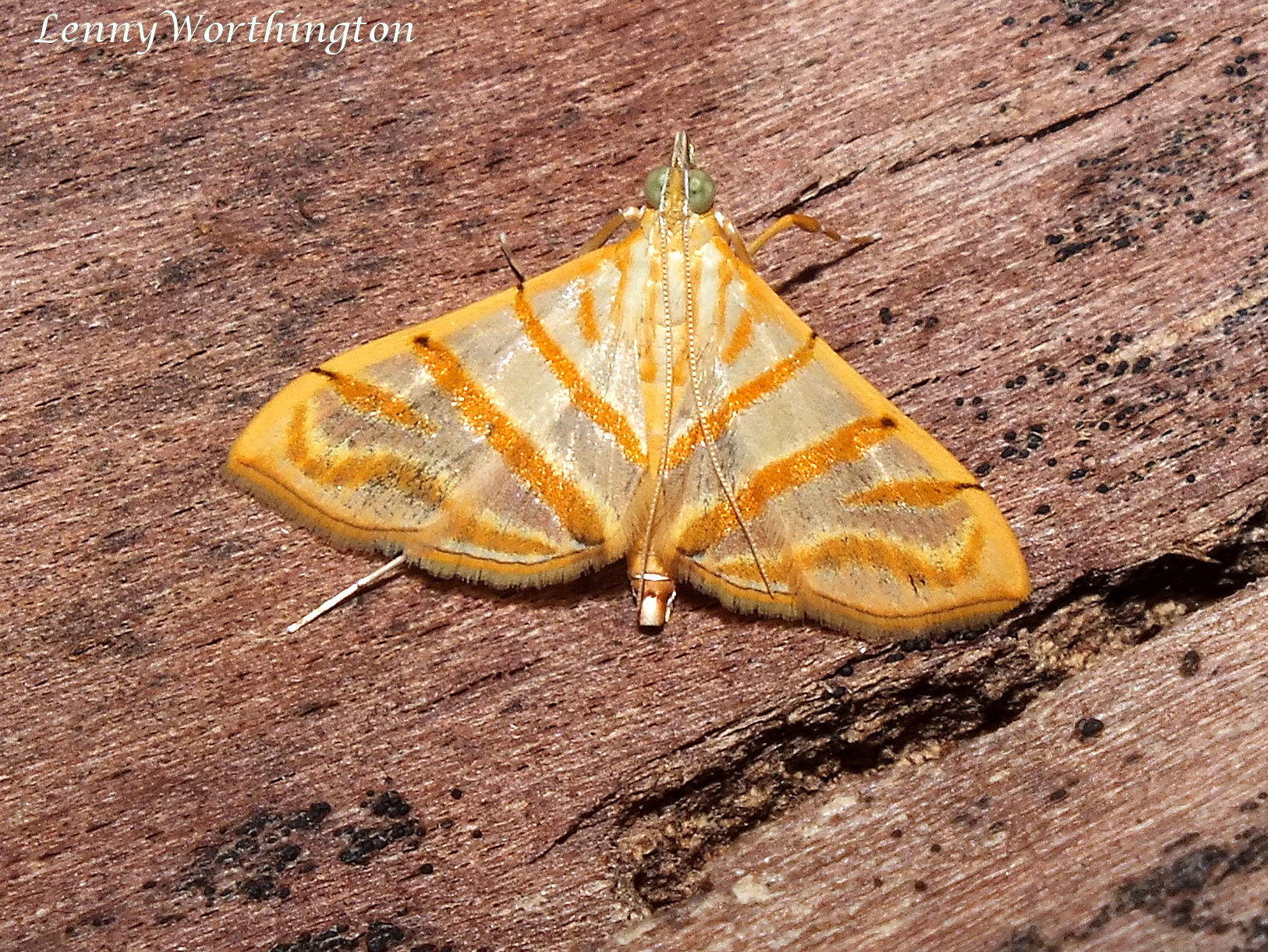
Pagyda salvalis

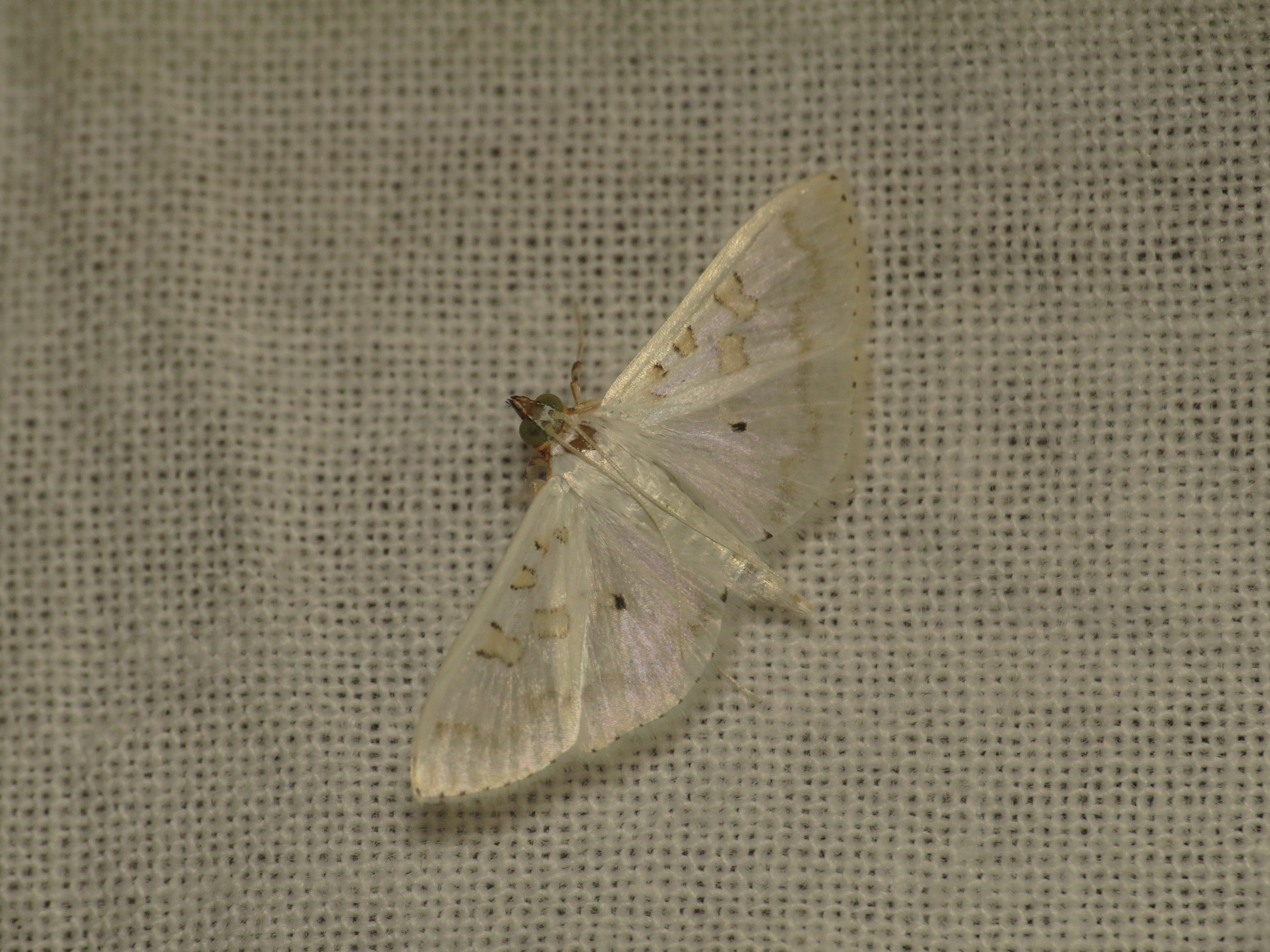
Palpita annulata

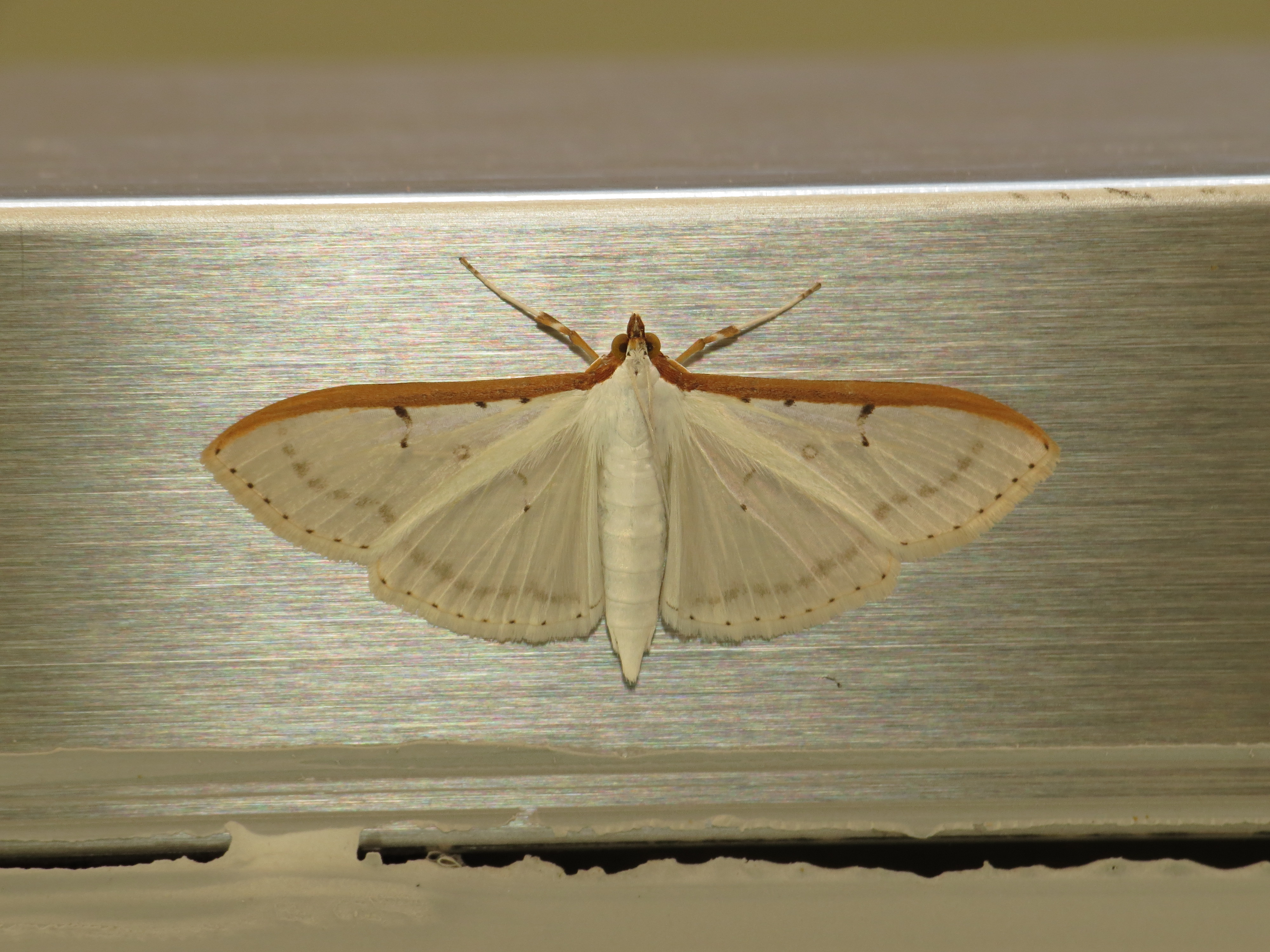
Palpita nigropunctalis

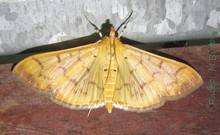
Pleuroptya balteata

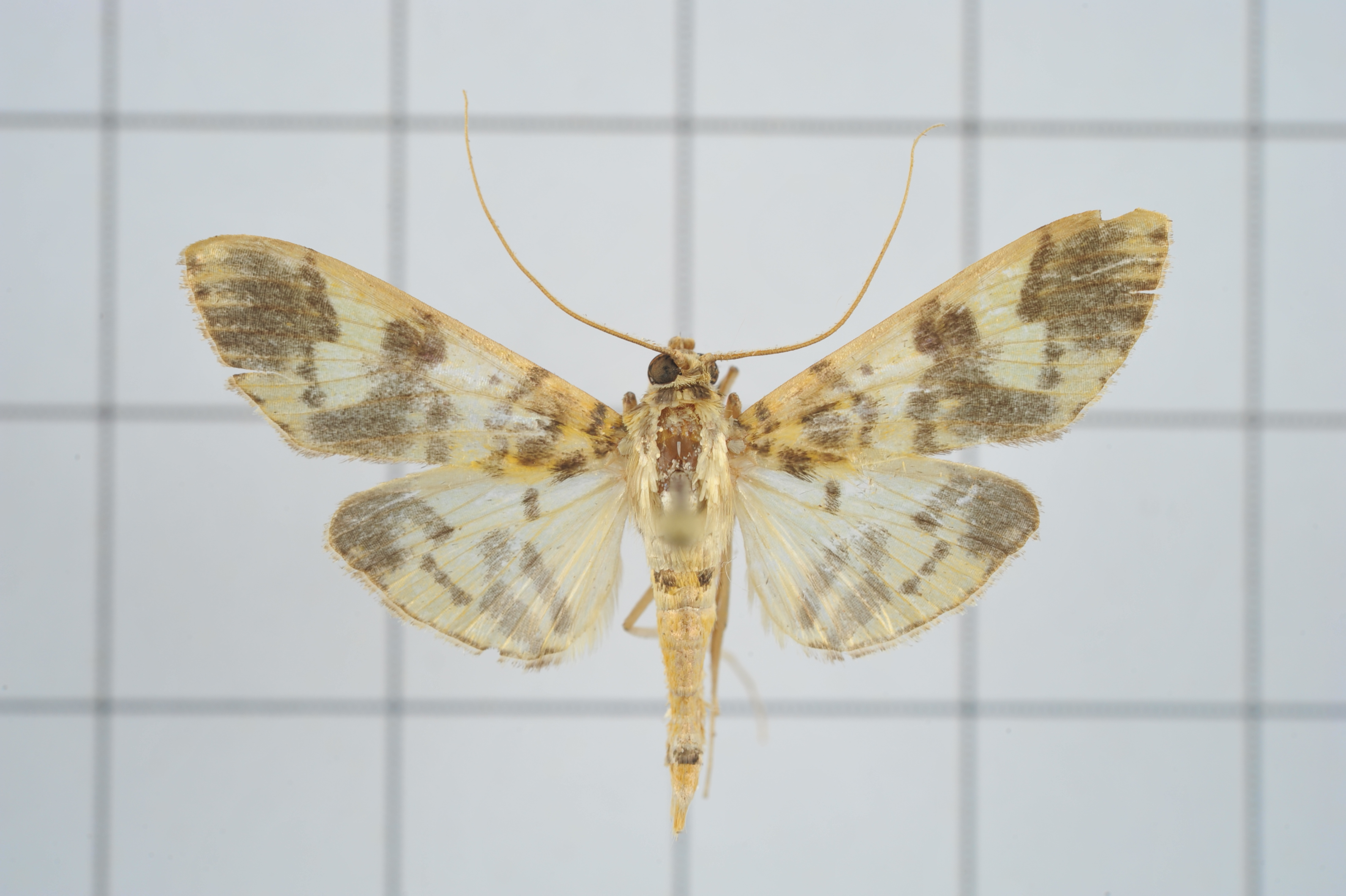
Patania iopasalis

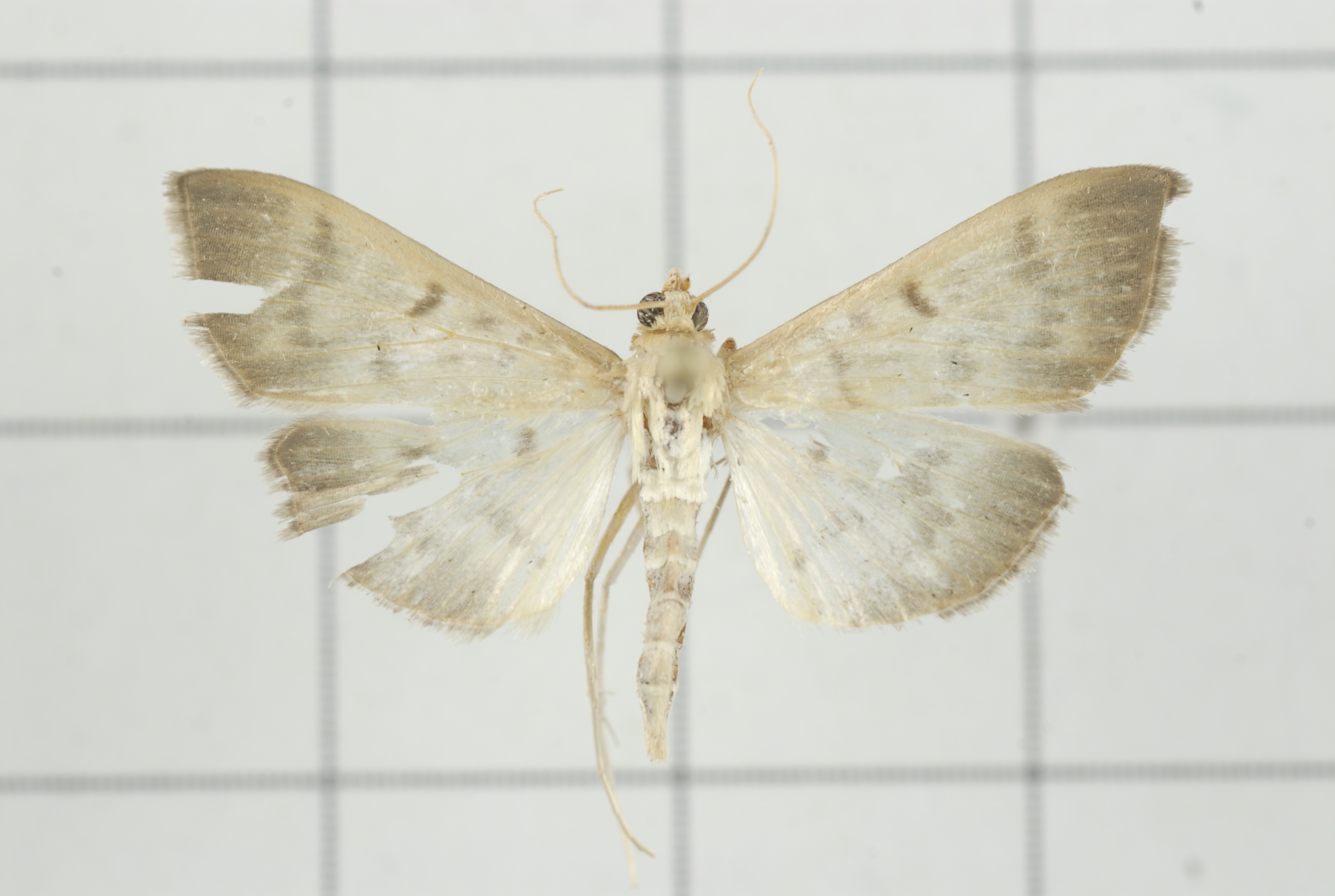
Patania sabinusalis

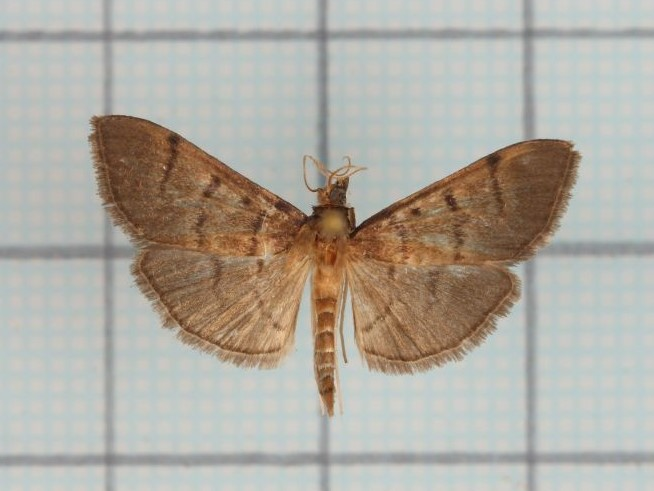
Phostria obscurata

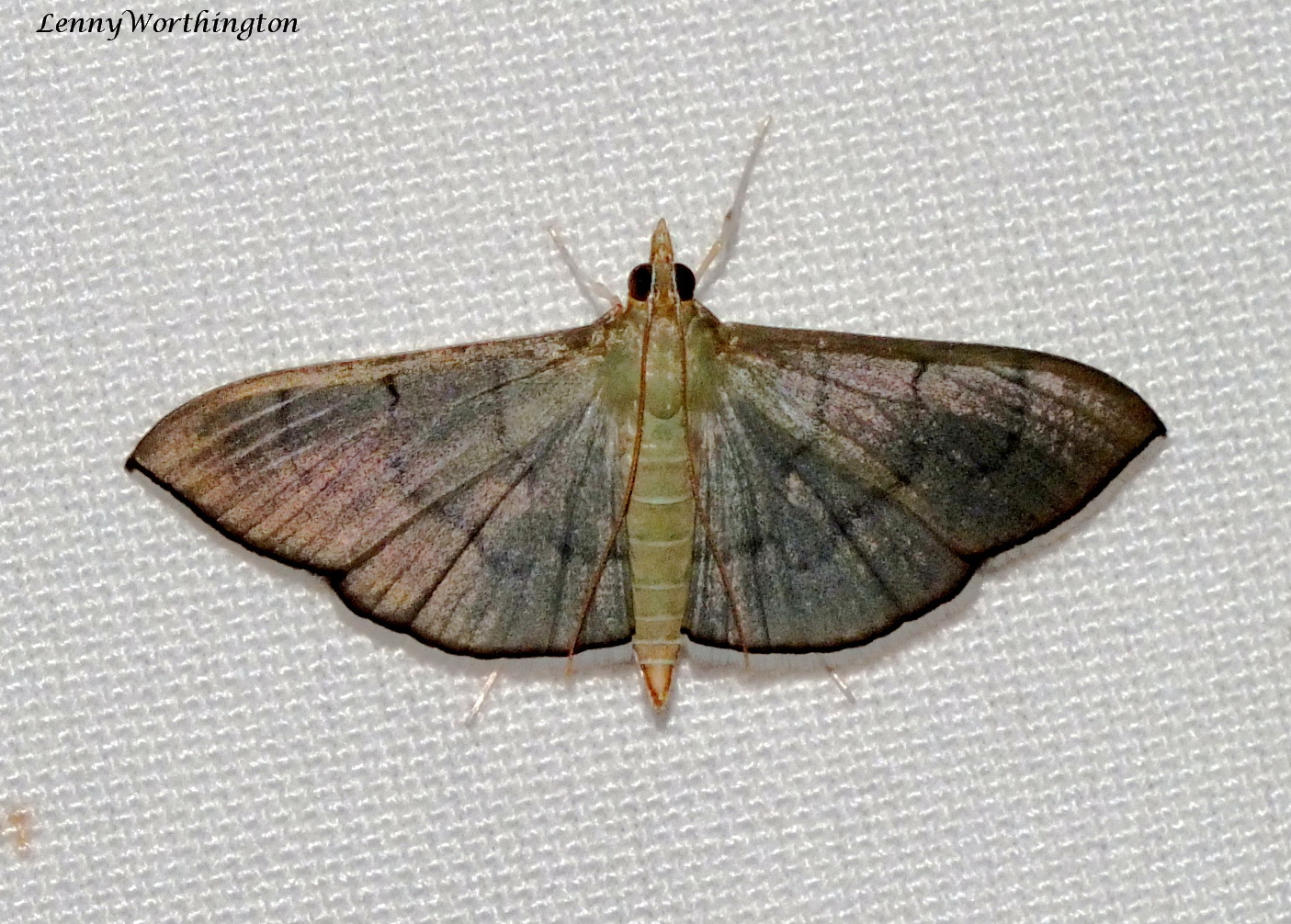
Poliobotys ablactalis

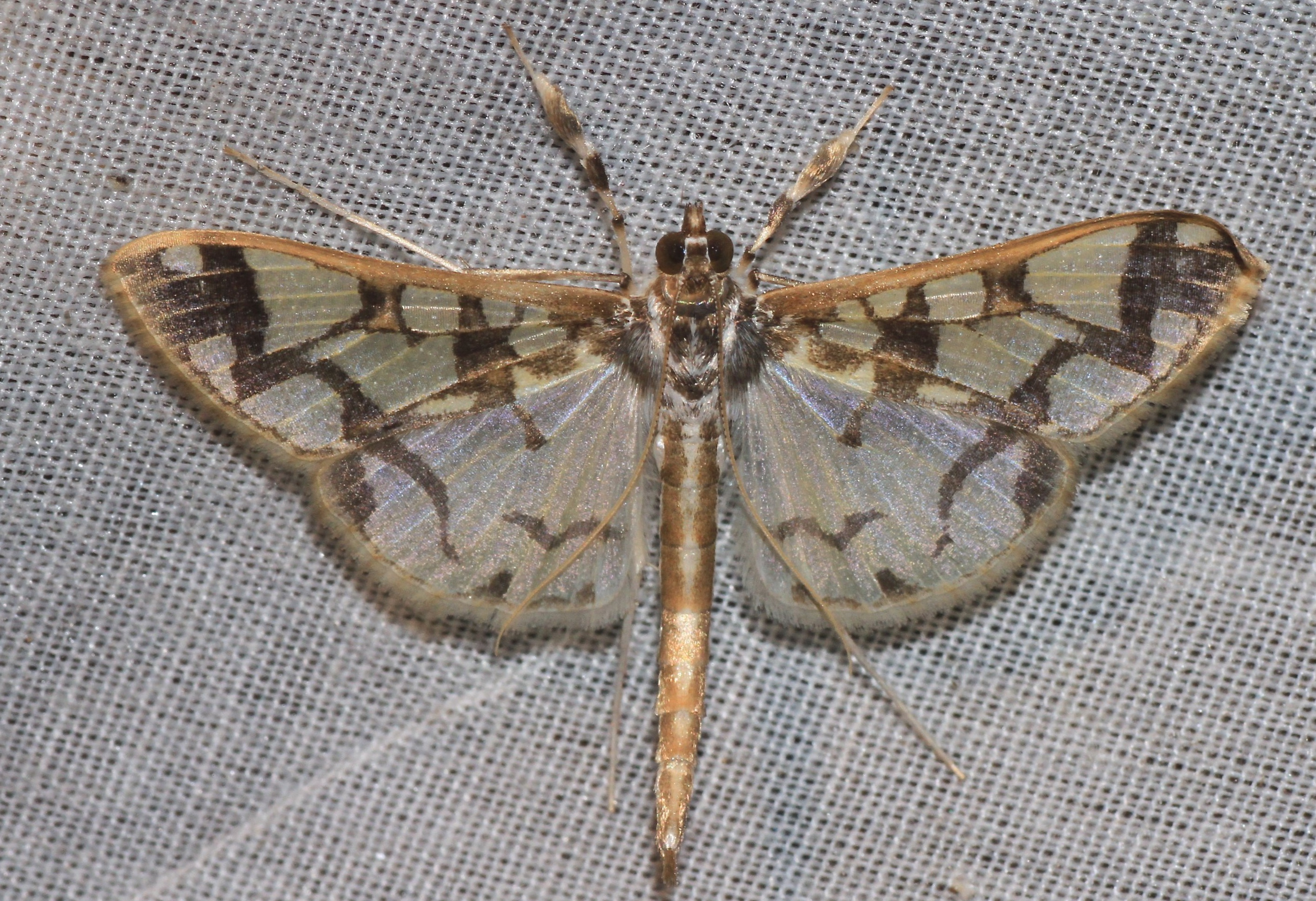
Polythlipta divaricata

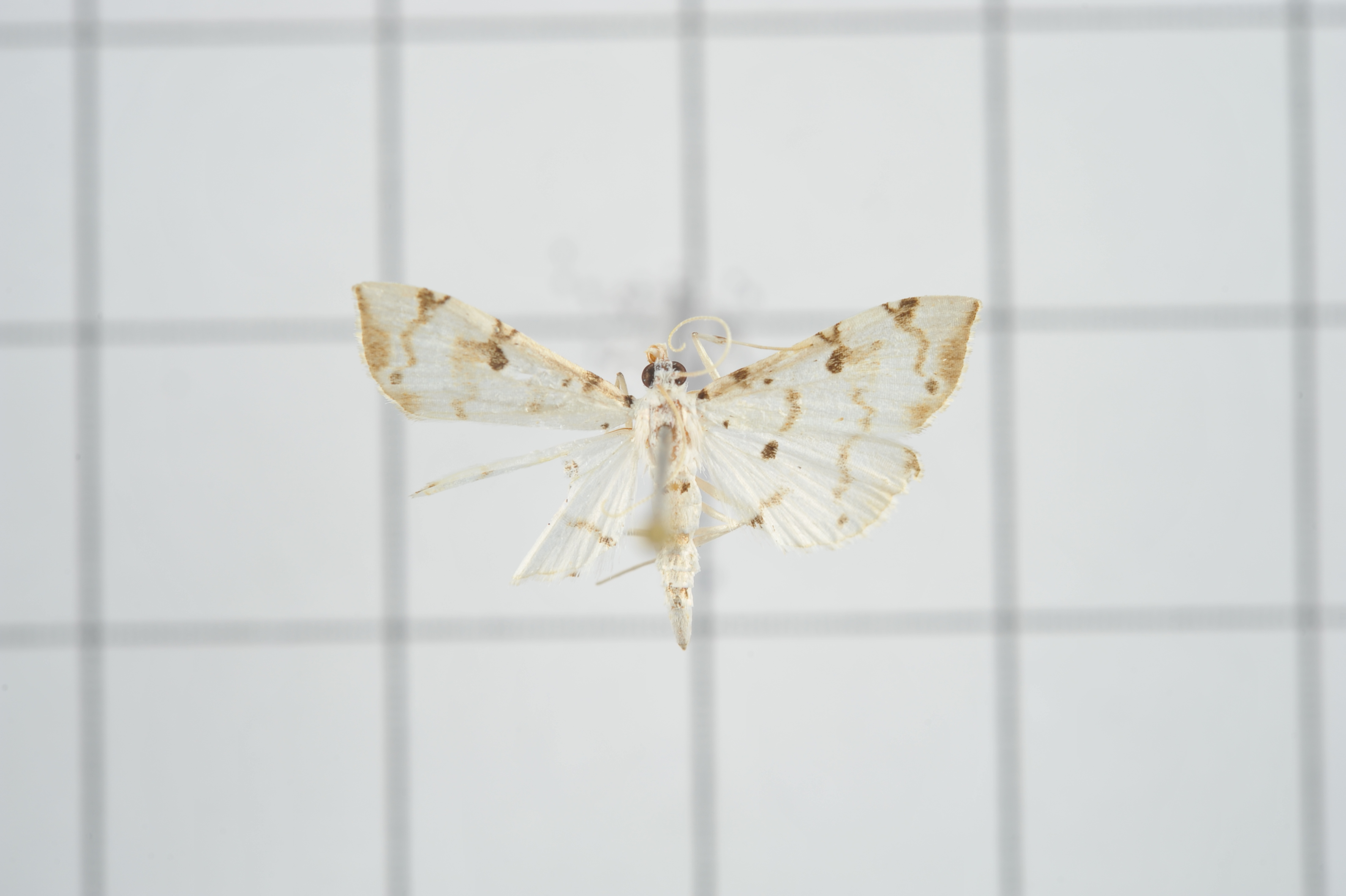
Pycnarmon meritalis

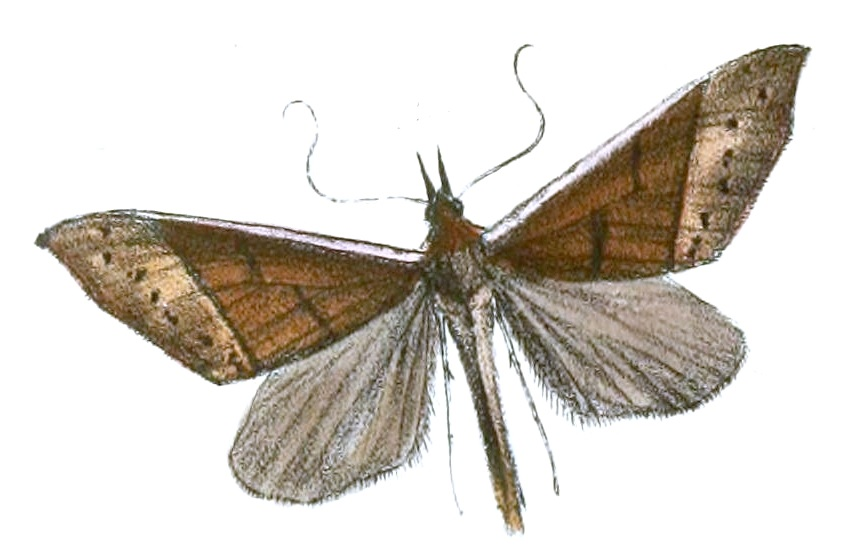
Pycnarmon virgatalis

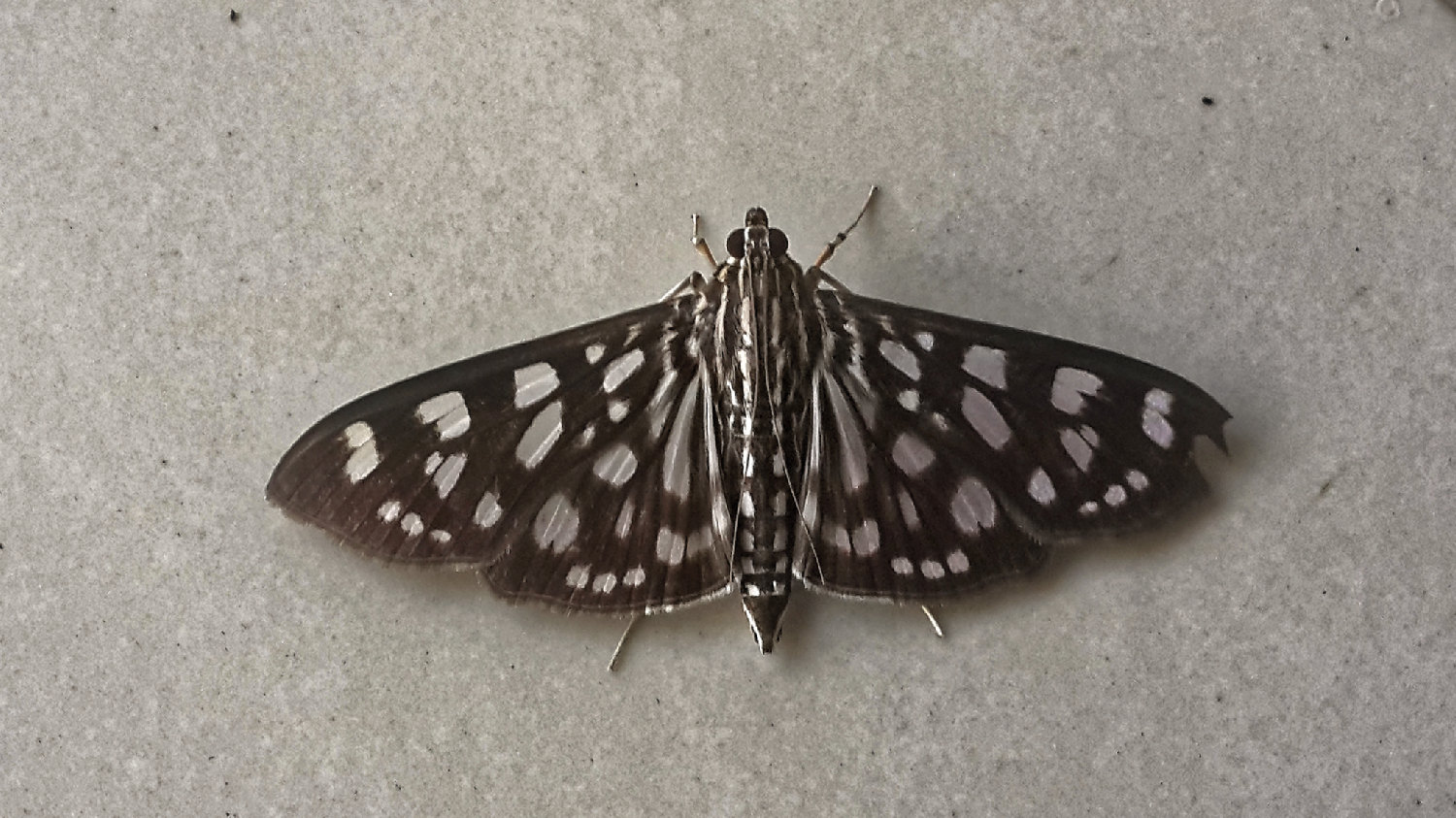
Pygospila tyres

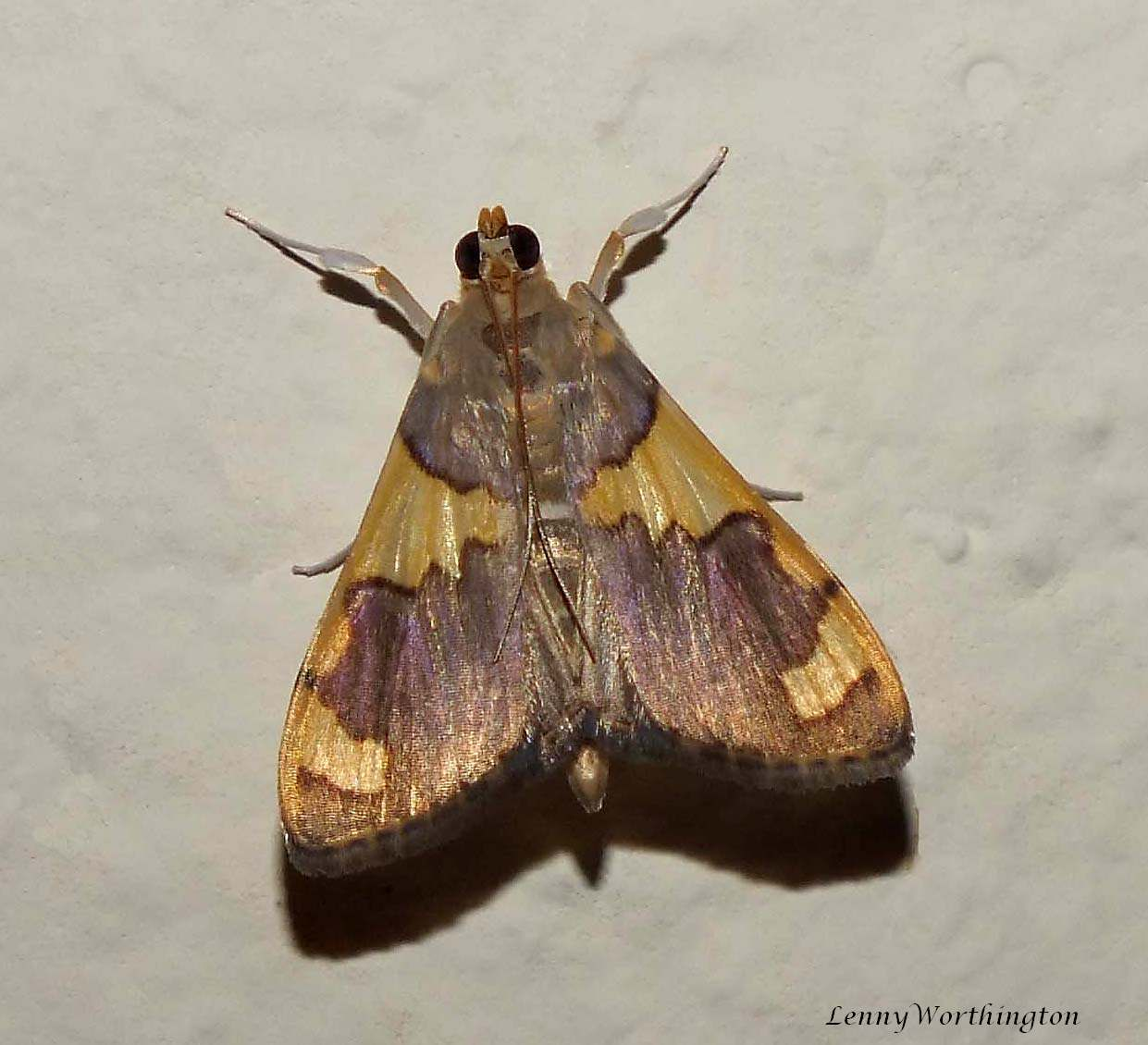
Rehimena phrynealis

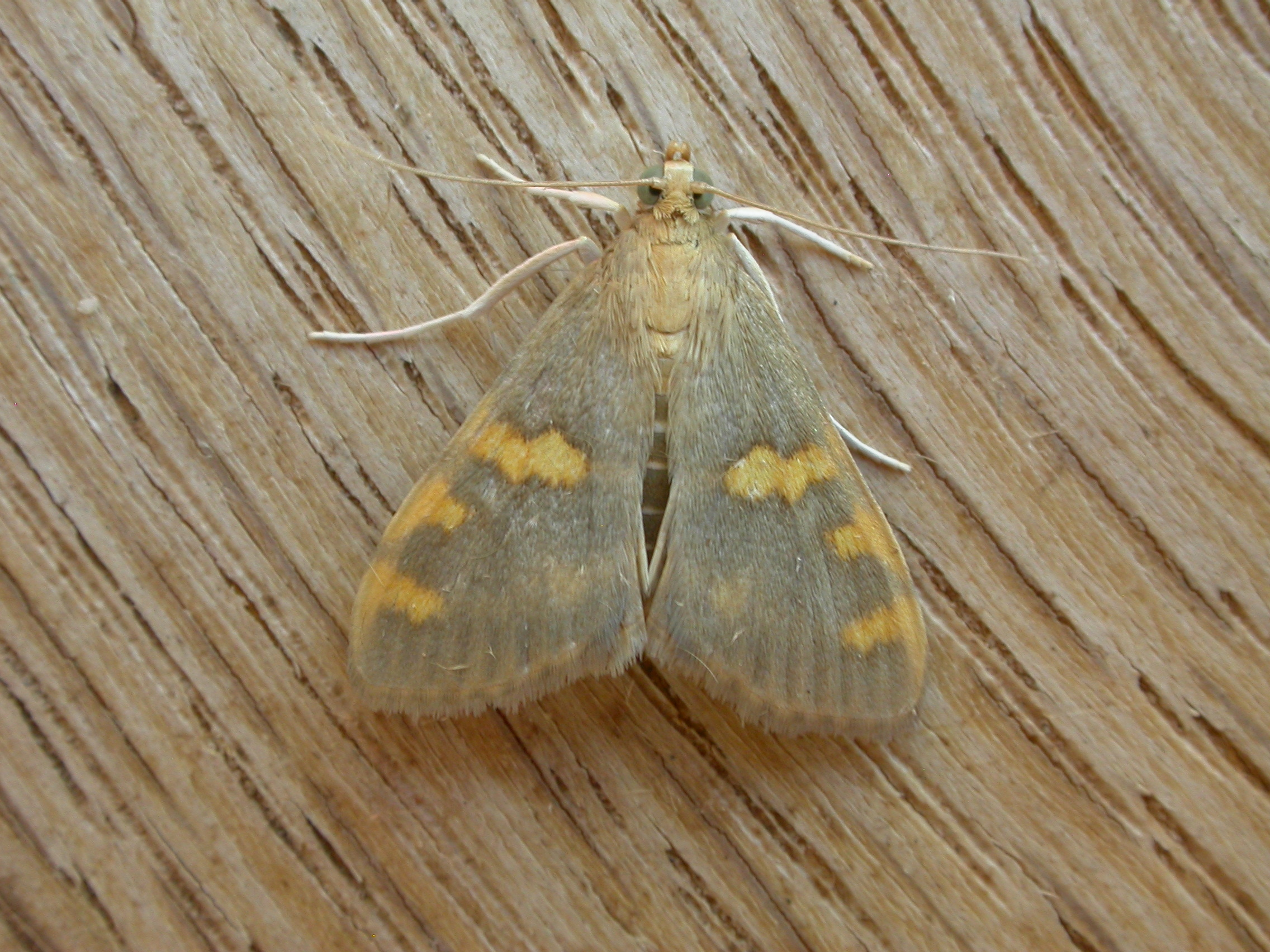
Rehimena surusalis

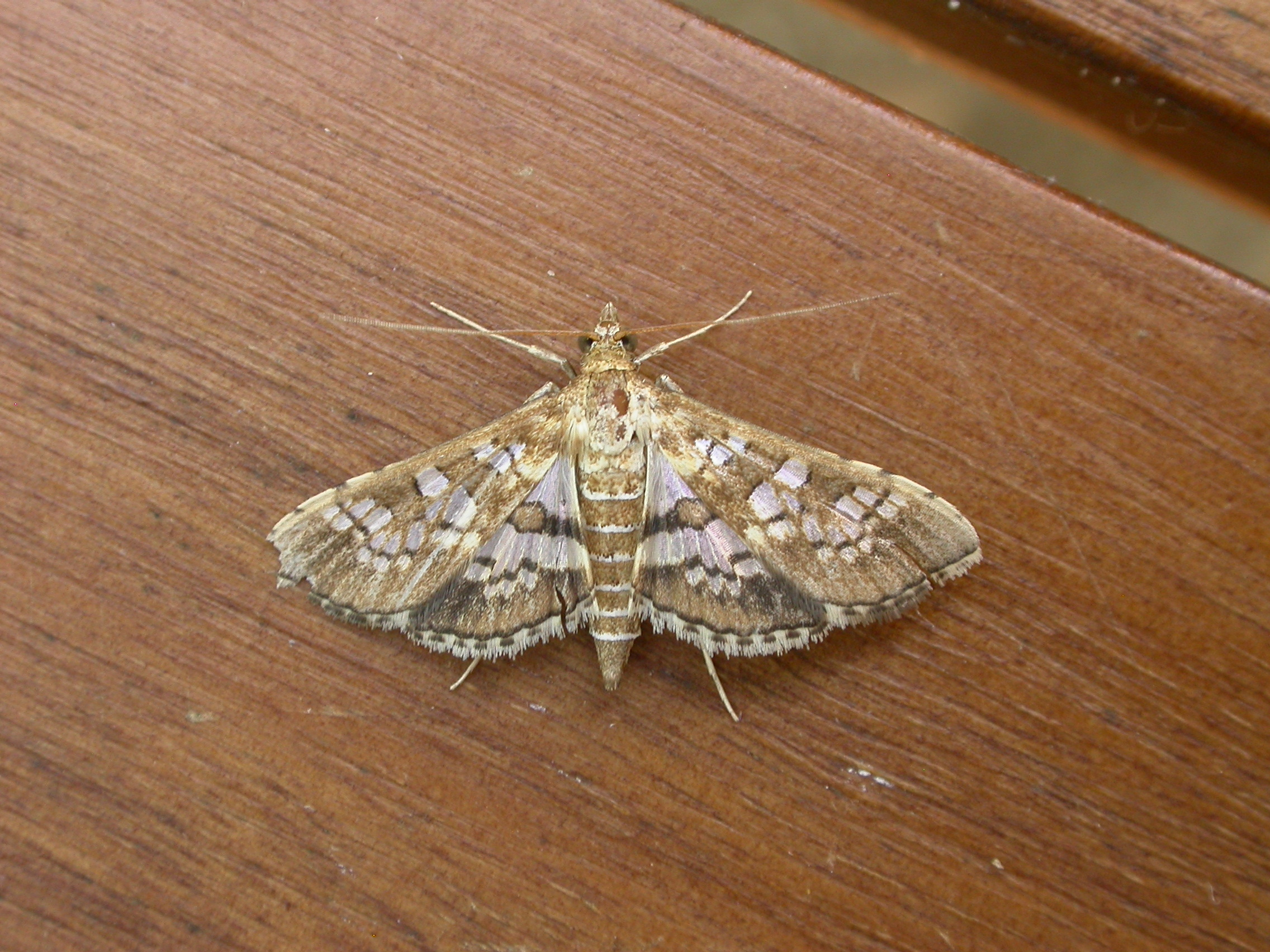
Sameodes cancellalis

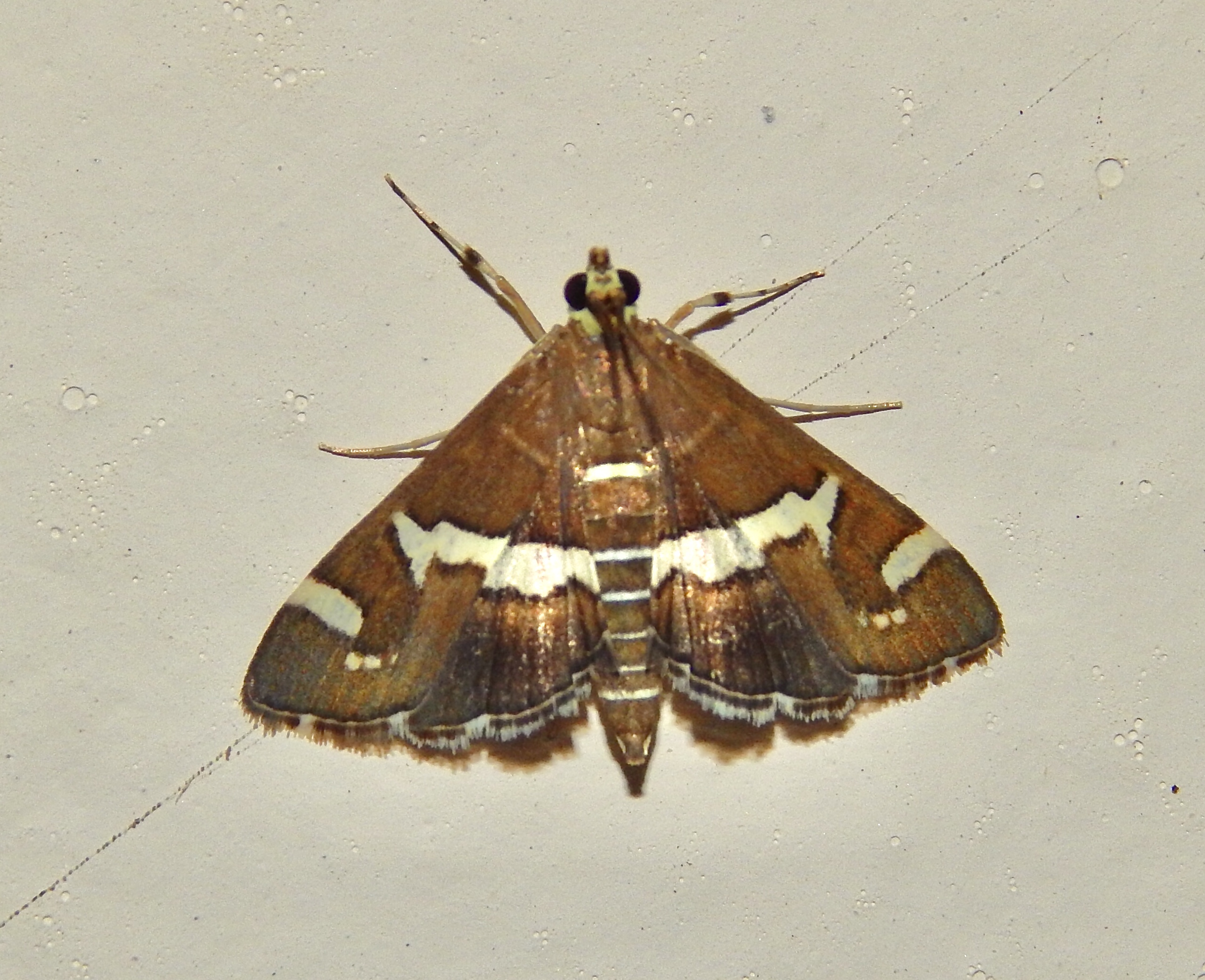
Spoladea recurvalis

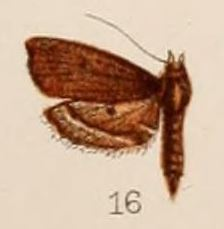
Sufetula nitidalis

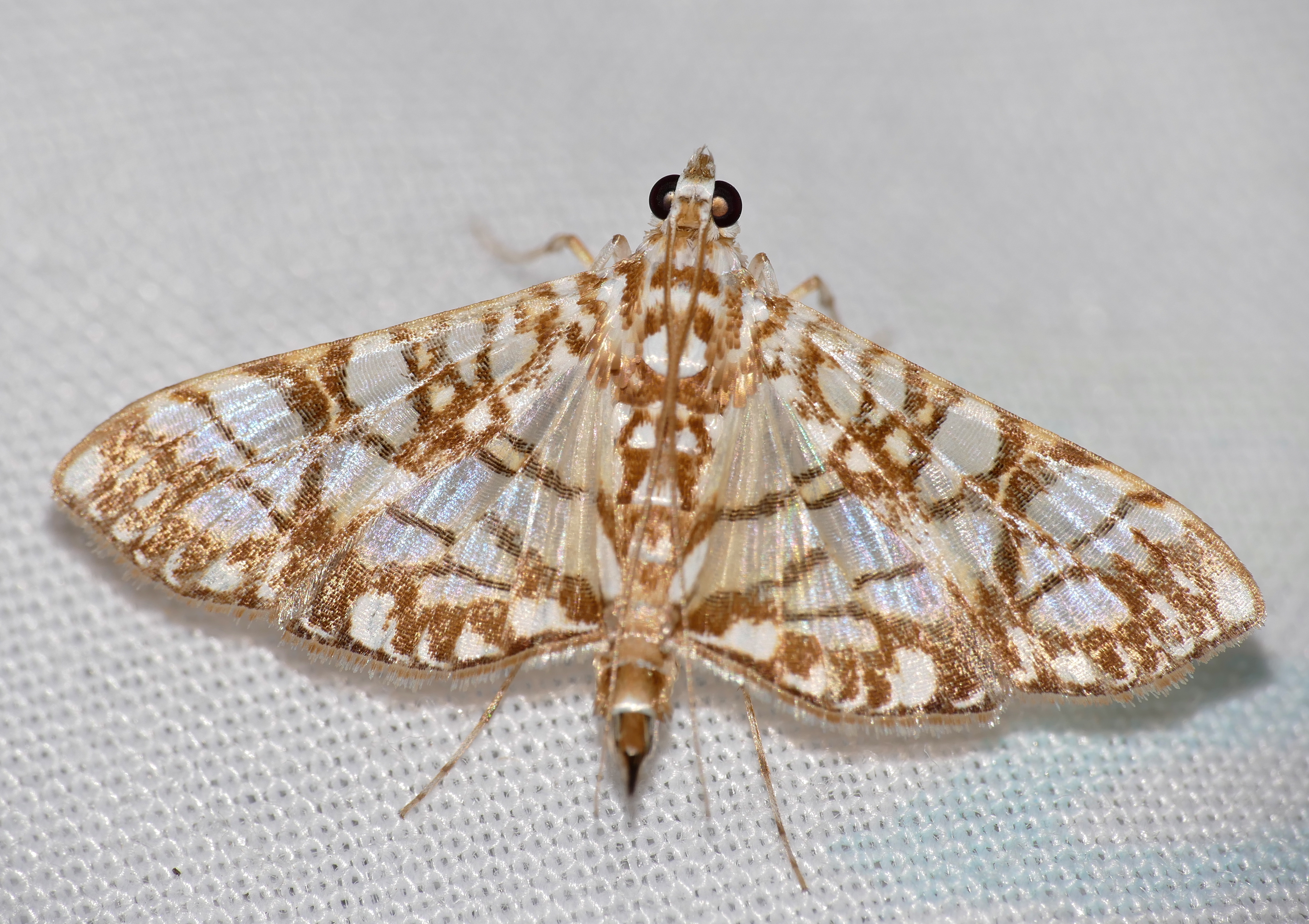
Synclera traducalis

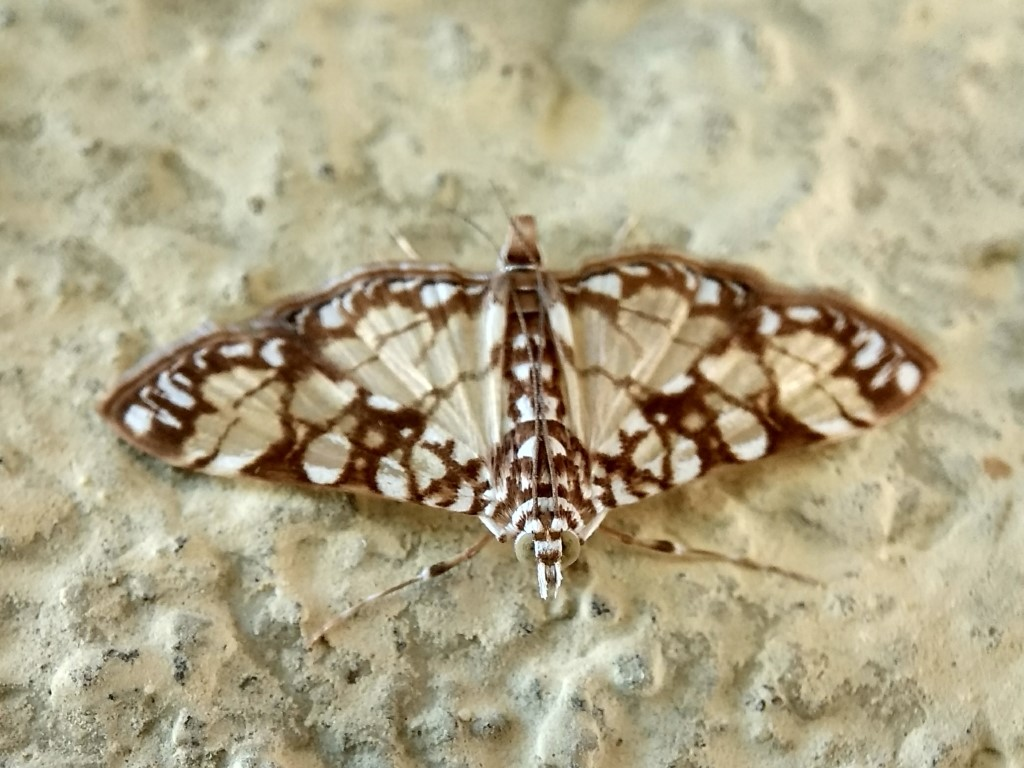
Synclera univocalis

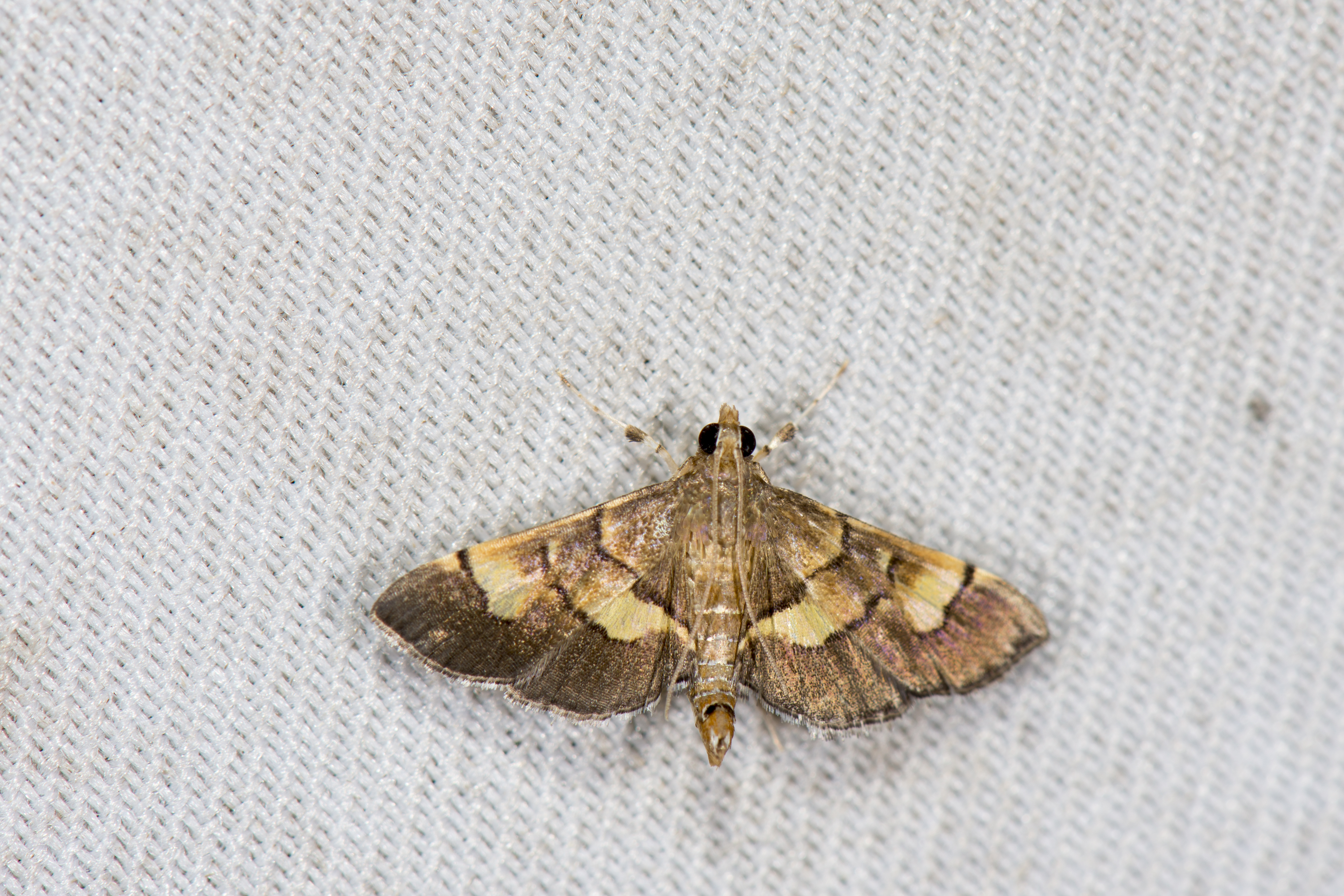
Syngamia falsidicalis

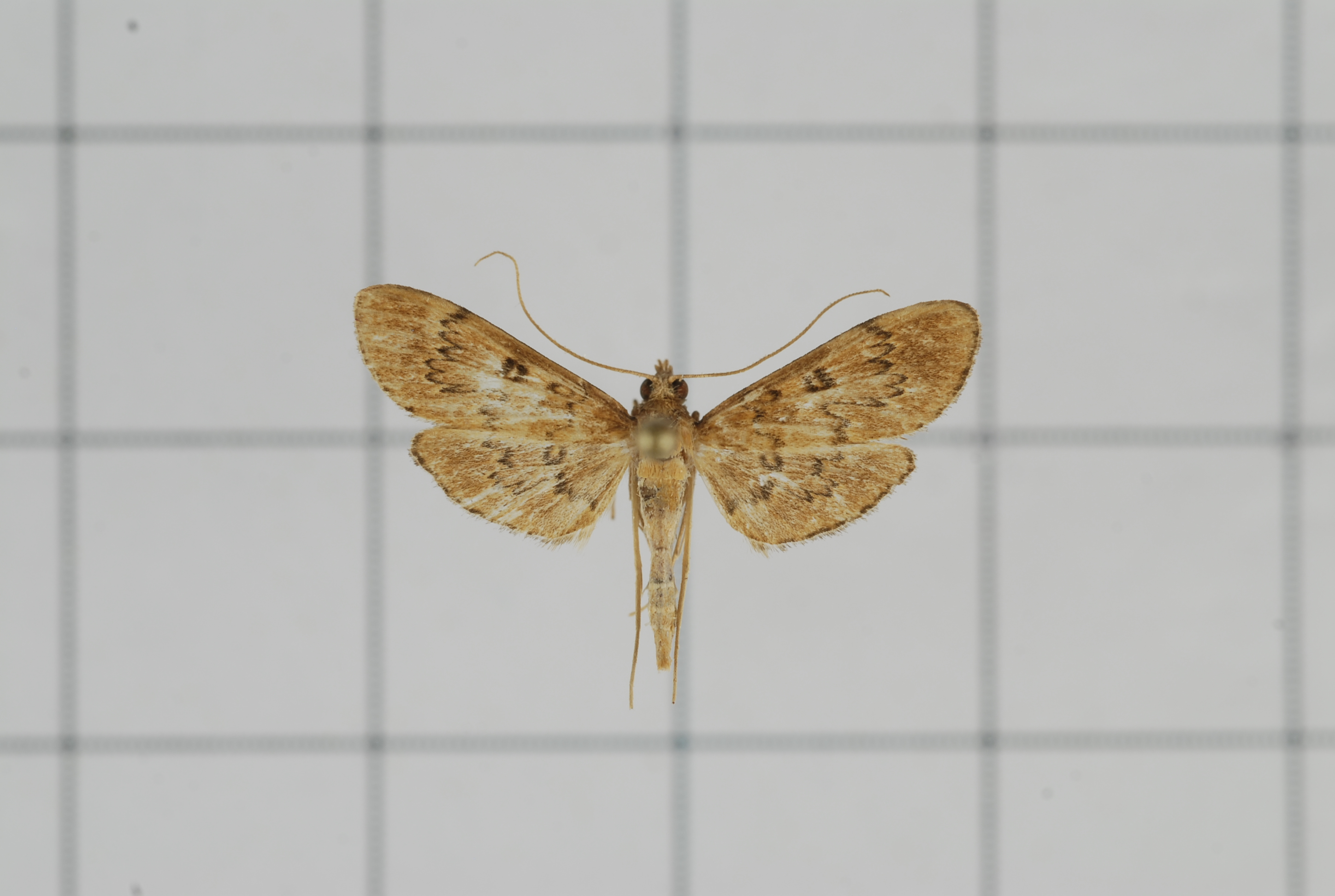
Tatobotys janapalis

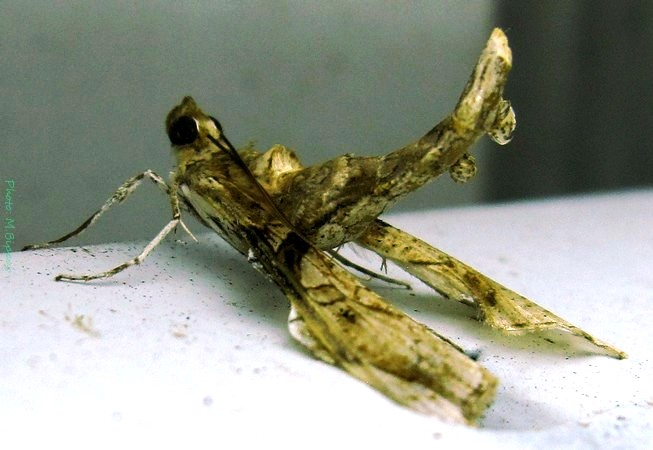
Terastia subjectalis

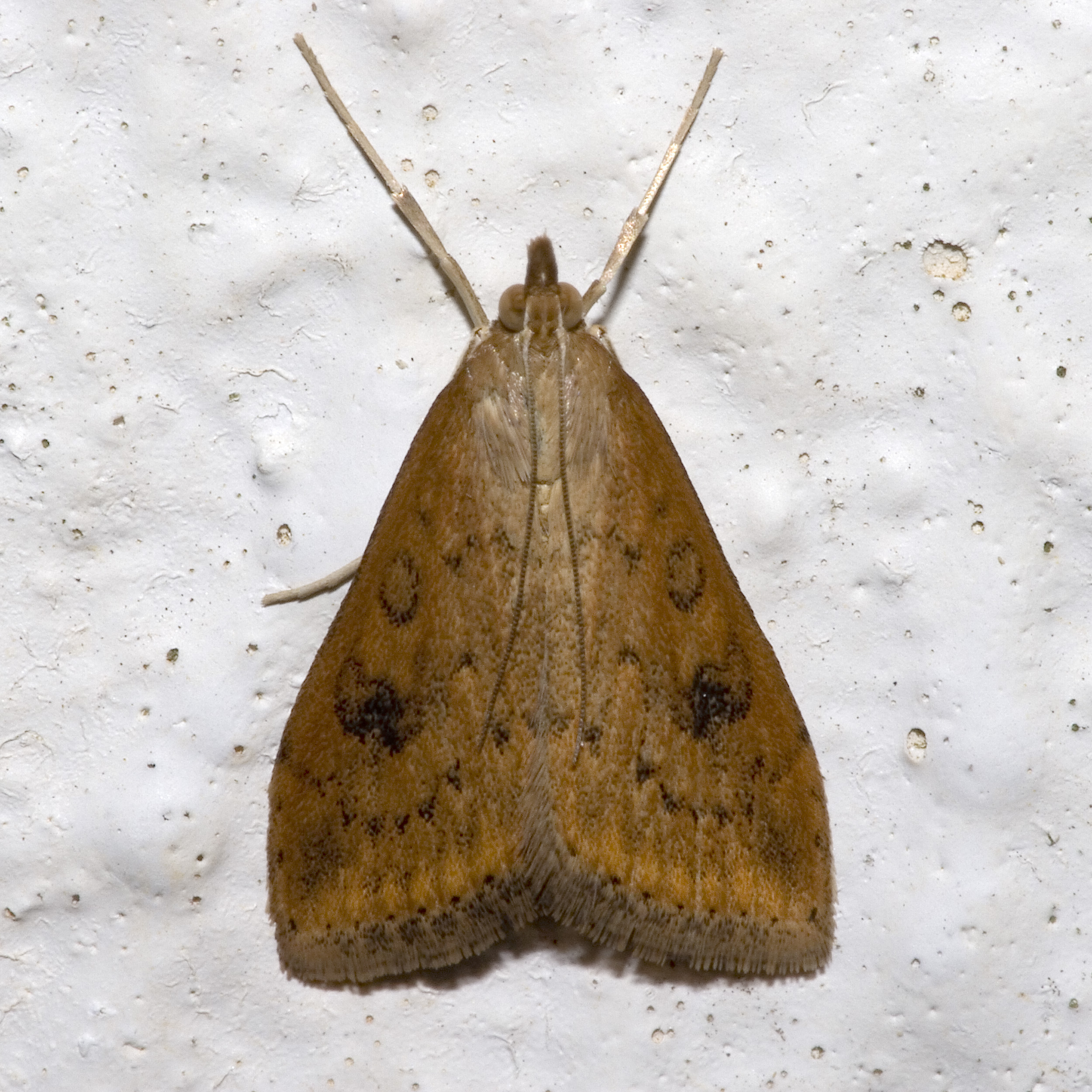
Udea ferrugalis

==== Wurthiinae ====
- Niphopyralis albida Hampson, 1893
- Niphopyralis contaminata Hampson, 1893
- Niphopyralis nivalis Hampson, 1893

=== Drepanidae - hooktip and false owlet moths ===
- Amphitorna albipuncta (Hampson, 1893)
- Callidrepana patrana (Moore, [1866])
- Canucha specularis (Moore, 1879)
- Drapetodes fratercula Moore, 1887
- Oreta extensa Walker, 1855
- Phalacra vidhisaria (Walker, 1860)
- Teldenia alba Moore, 1882
- Tridrepana acuta Watson, 1957
- Tridrepana albonotata (Moore, 1879)
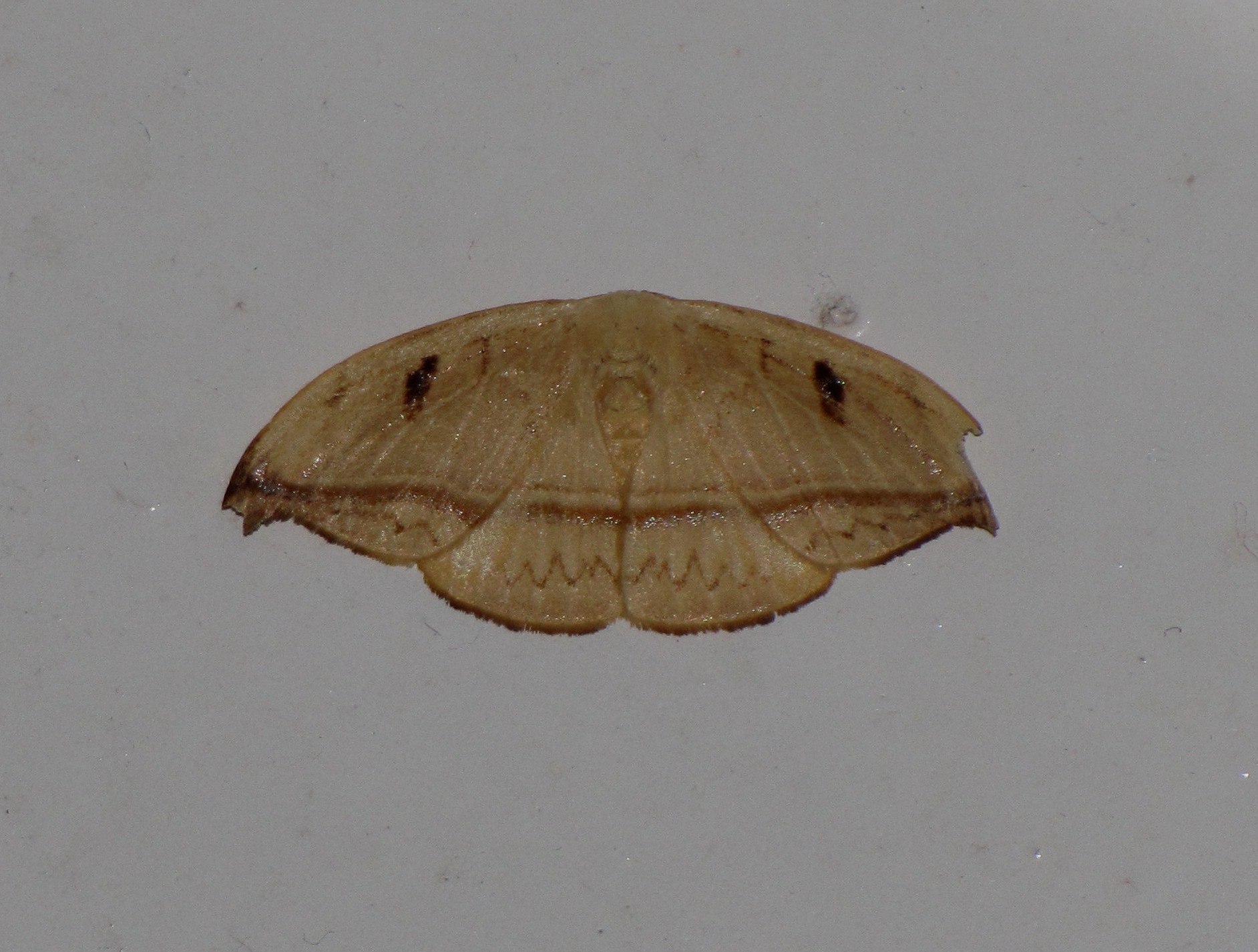
Callidrepana patrana

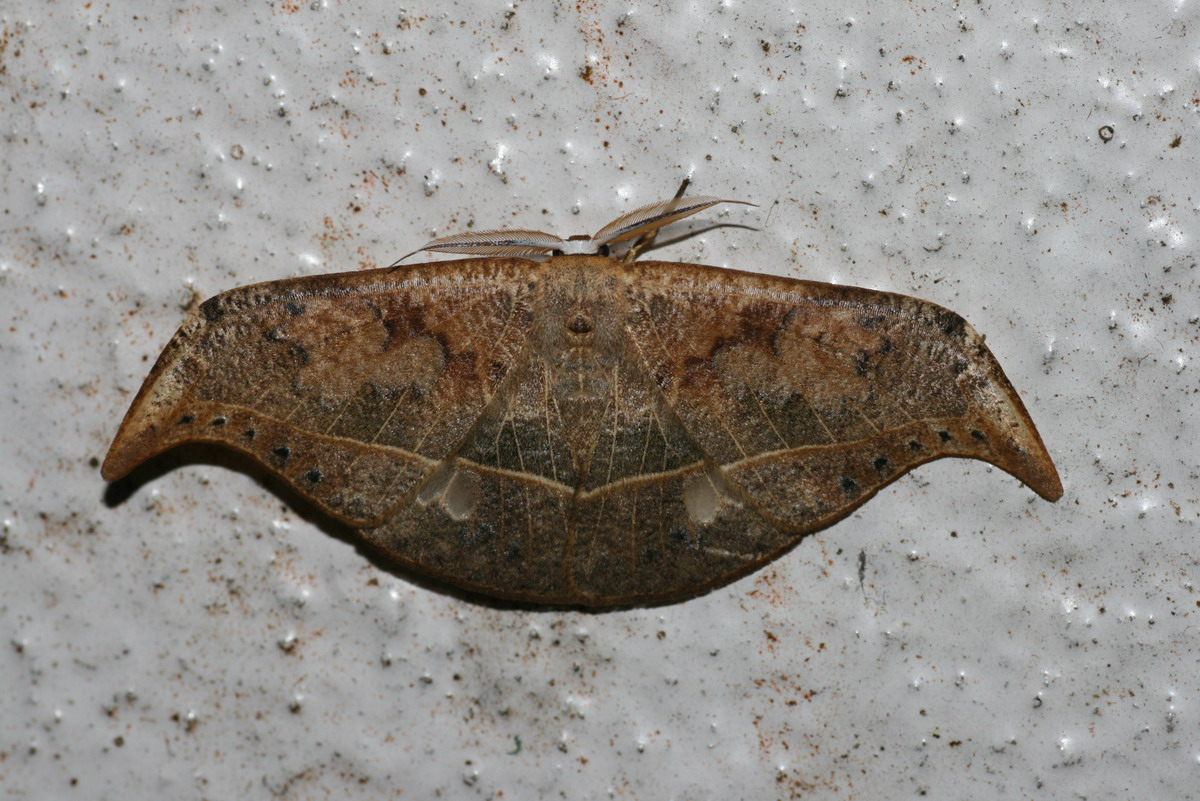
Canucha specularis

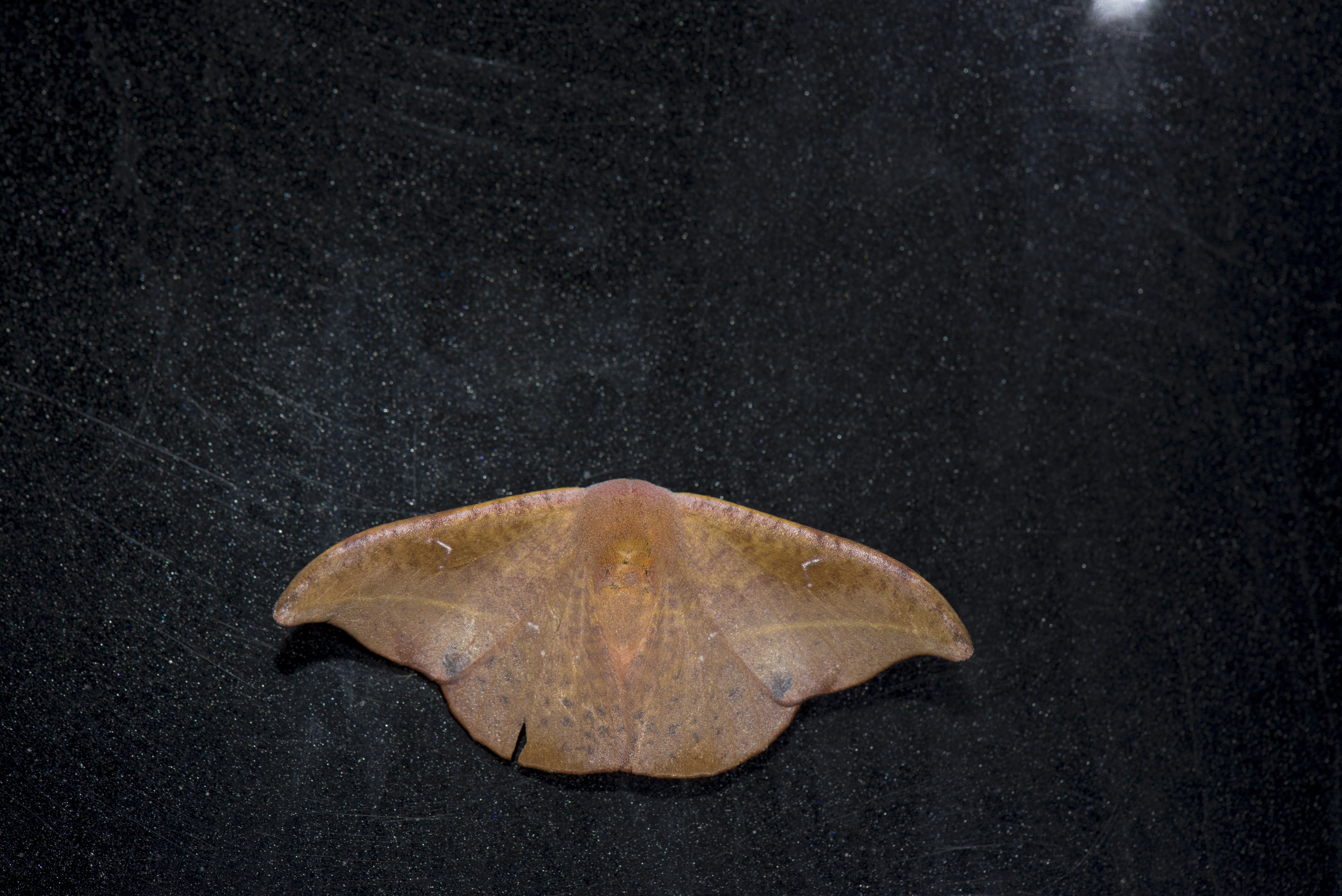
Oreta extensa

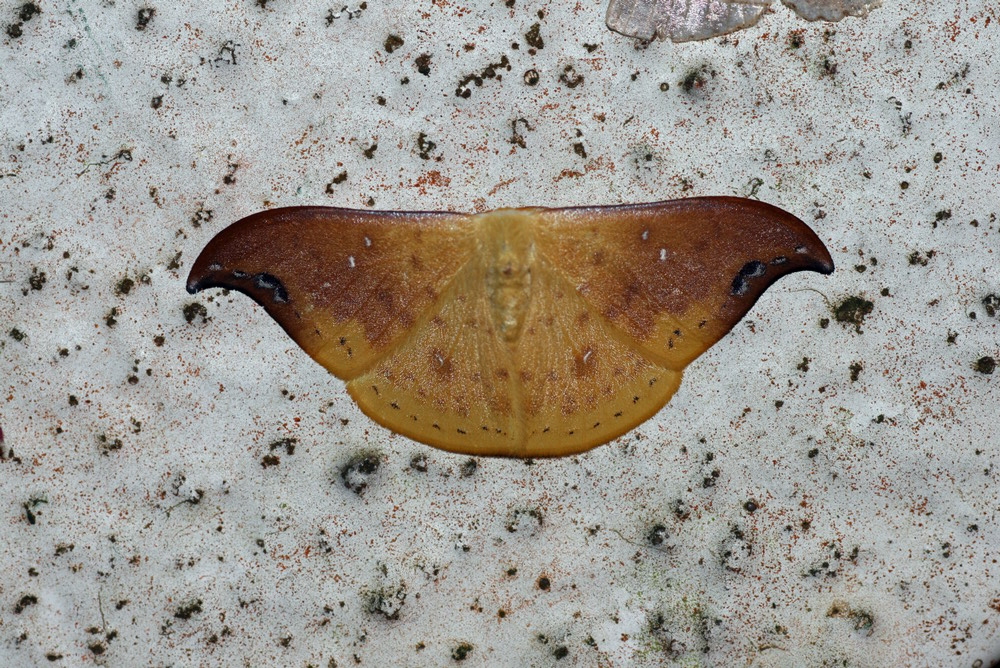
Tridrepana albonotata

=== Depressariidae ===
- Odites paracyrta (Meyrick, 1905)
- Odites psilotis (Meyrick, 1905)

=== Dudgeoneidae ===
- Dudgeonea leucosticta Hampson, 1900

=== Elachistidae - grass-miner moths ===
- Acria emarginella (Donovan, 1804)
- Acria obtusella (Walker, 1864)
- Cryptolechia aganopis (Meyrick, 1905)
- Cryptolechia chrysocoma (Meyrick, 1905)
- Cryptolechia micracma Meyrick, 1910
- Cryptolechia orthotoma (Meyrick, 1905)
- Cryptolechia tetraspilella (Walker, 1864)
- Elachista brachyplectra Meyrick, 1921
- Ethmia hilarella (Walker, 1863)

=== Epipyropidae - planthopper parasite moths ===
- Epipyrops pallidipuncta Hampson, 1896
- Epipyrops poligrapha Hampson, 1910
- Epiricania melanoleuca (T. B. Fletcher, 1939)

=== Erebidae - underwing moths ===
==== Aganainae ====
- Asota caricae (Fabricius; 1775)
- Asota ficus (Fabricius; 1775)
- Asota plaginota (Butler, 1875)
- Asota plana (Walker, 1854)
- Asota producta (Butler, 1875)
- Digama fasciata Butler, 1877
- Digama hearseyana Moore, 1860
- Digama insulana (Felder, 1868)
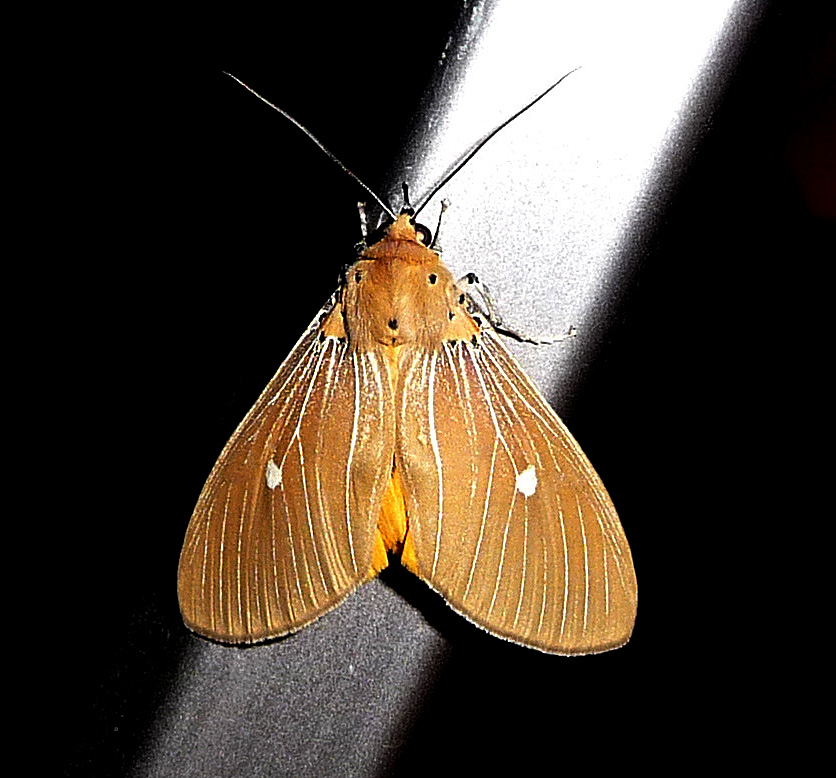
Asota caricae

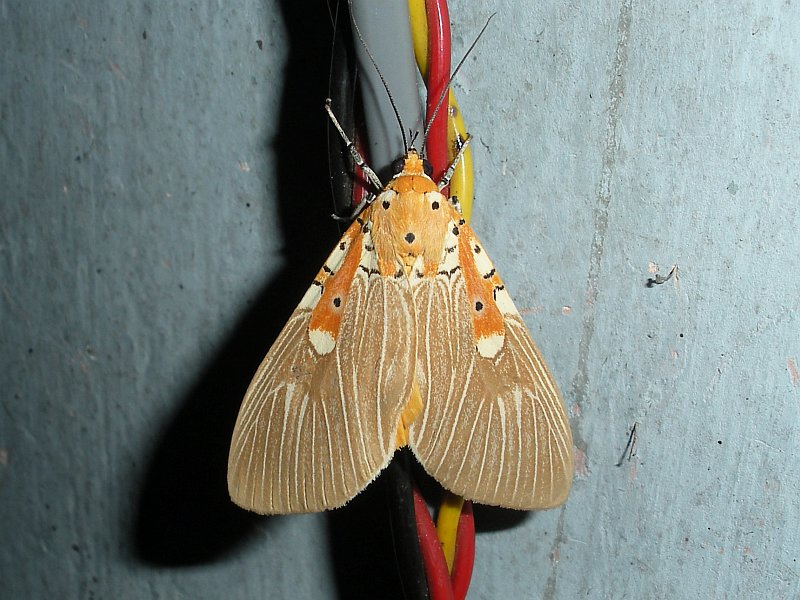
Asota ficus

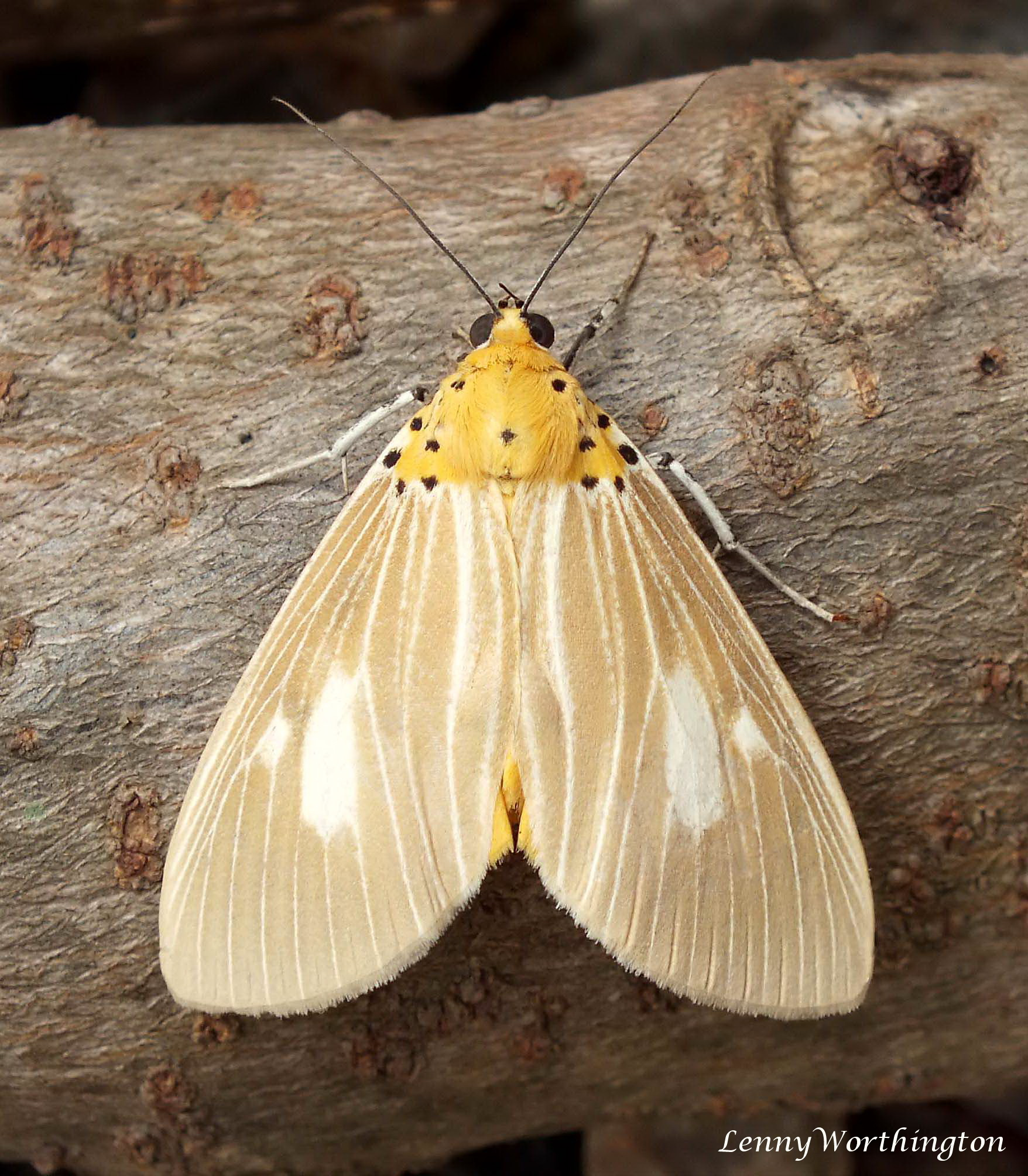
Asota plaginota

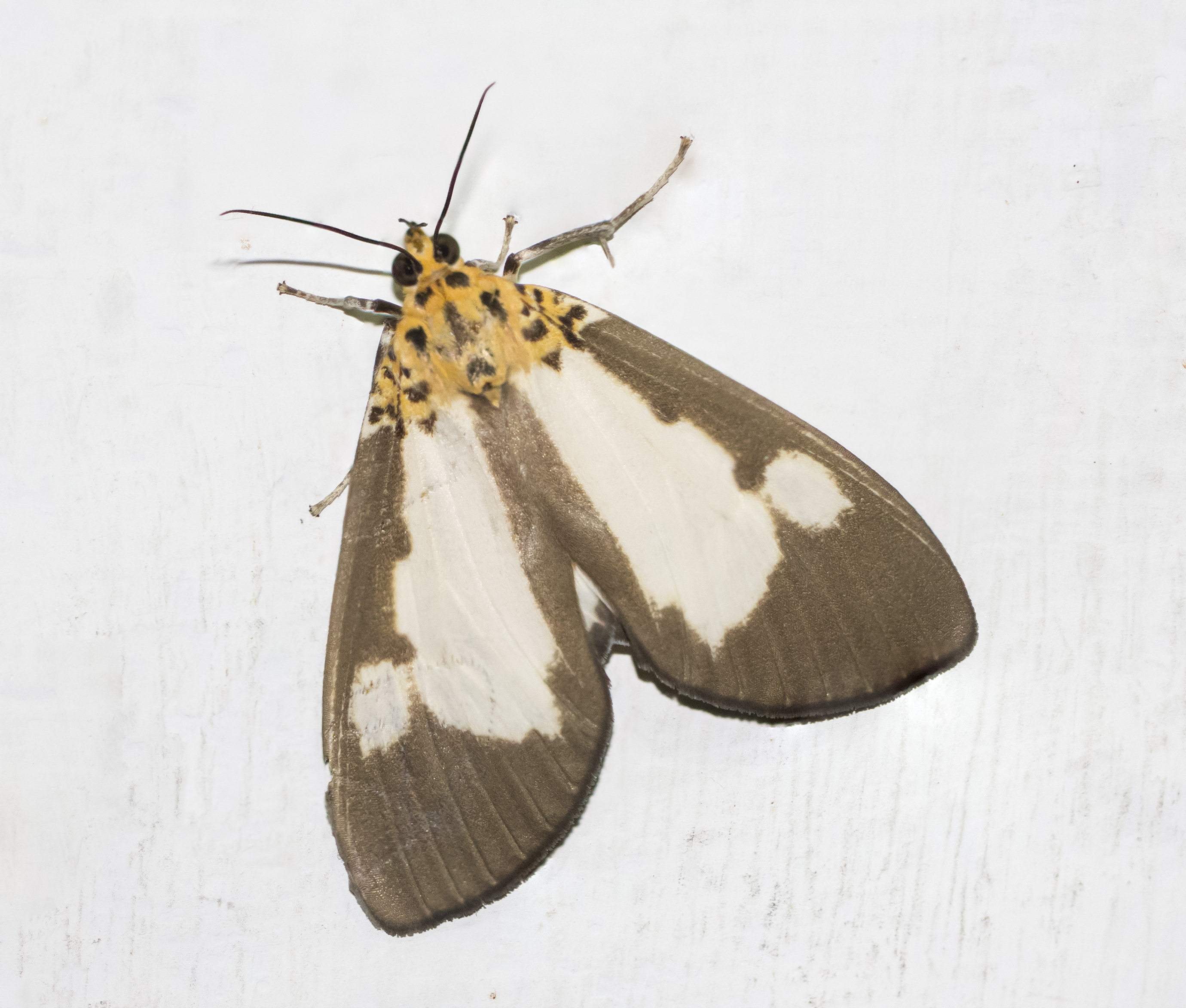
Asota plana

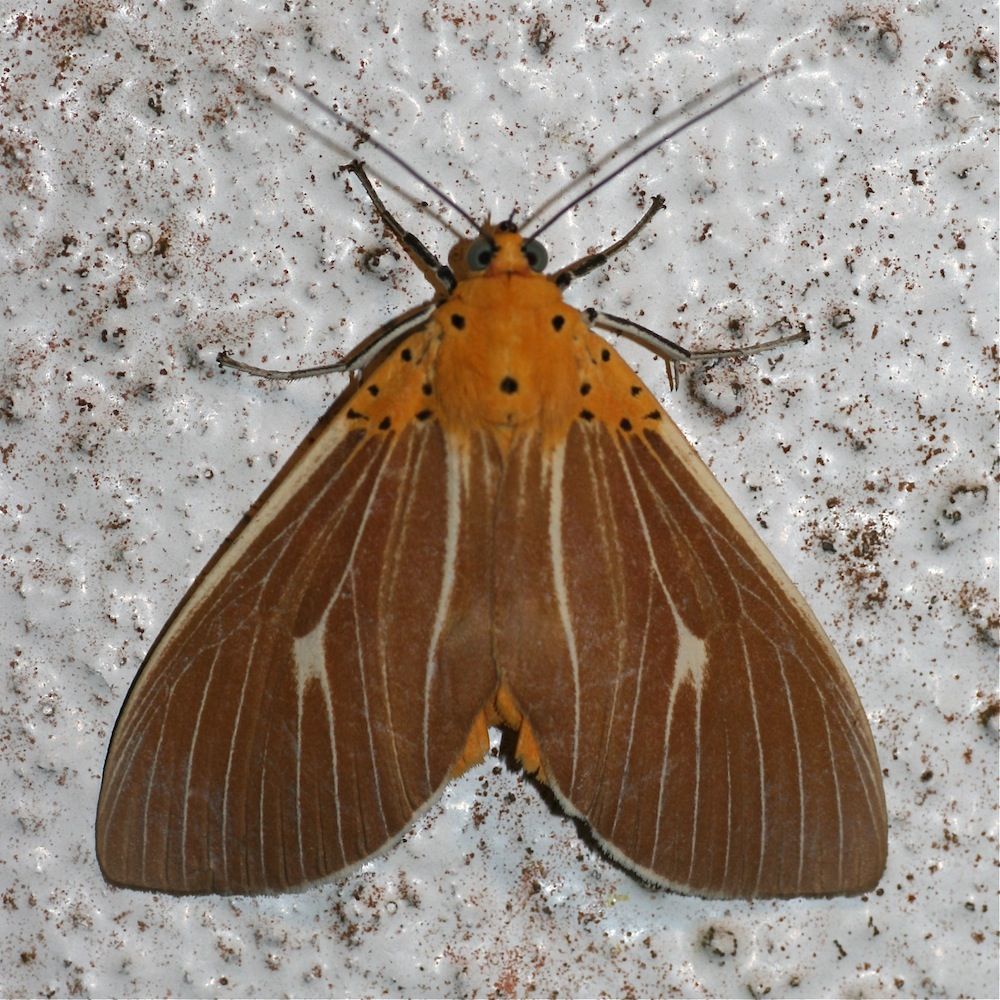
Asota producta

==== Anobinae - anobine moths ====
- Anoba sinuata (Fabricius 1775)

==== Arctiinae - tiger and lichen moths ====
- Aemene taprobanis Walker, 1854
- Aloa lactinea (Cramer, 1777)
- Alytarchia leonina (Walker, [1865])
- Amata albapex (Hampson, 1893)
- Amata cyssea (Stoll, 1782)
- Amata passalis (Fabricius, 1781)
- Amata thoracica Moore, 1877
- Amerila astreus (Drury, 1773)
- Amerila eugenia (Fabricius, 1794)
- Argina astrea (Drury, 1773)
- Asura arcuata (Moore, 1882)
- Asura hilaris Walker, 1854
- Asura ila Rothschild, 1913
- Asura floccosa (Walker, 1864)
- Asura metamelas (Hampson, 1893)
- Asura rubricosa (Moore, 1878)
- Asura ruptifascia (Hampson, 1893)
- Asura semifascia (Walker, 1854)
- Asura solita (Walker, 1854)
- Asura uniformis Hampson, 1893
- Asura varians (Hampson, 1893)
- Barsine cuneonotata (Walker, 1855)
- Barsine defecta Walker, 1854
- Brunia antica (Walker 1854)
- Ceryx diptera (Fabricius, 1775)
- Chamaita nympha (Moore, 1887)
- Creatonotos gangis (Linnaeus, 1763)
- Creatonotos interrupta (Linnaeus, 1767)
- Curoba sangarida (Stoll, 1782)
- Cyana detrita Walker, 1854
- Cyana peregrina (Walker, 1854)
- Cyana puella (Dryry, 1773)
- Cyana subornata (Walker, 1854)
- Cyclosiella dulcicula (Swinhoe, 1890)
- Diduga albicosta Hampson, 1893
- Diduga flavicostata (Snellen, 1878)
- Dolgoma angulifera (Felder, 1868)
- Dolgoma oblitterans (Felder, 1868)
- Eilema fuscipes (Hampson, 1893)
- Eilema fasciata (Moore, 1878)
- Eilema intermixta Kühne, 2007
- Eilema punctifera Hampson, 1893
- Eressa confinis (Walker, 1854)
- Eressa subaurata (Walker, 1854)
- Eressa vespa Hampson, 1898
- Euchromia magna (Swinhoe, 1891)
- Euchromia polymena (Linnaeus, 1758)
- Eugoa bipunctata (Walker, 1862)
- Eugoa bipuncta (Heylaerts, 1891)
- Eugoa trifasciella Strand, 1922
- Eurosia grisea (Hampson, 1893)
- Eurosia trimaculata (Hamson, 1893)
- Gampola fasciata Moore, 1878
- Garudinia latana (Walker, 1863)
- Hemonia orbiferana (Walker, 1863)
- Holocraspedon nigropunctum Hampson, 1893
- Lemyra subfascia (Walker, 1855)
- Machairophora fulvipuncta Hampson, 1893
- Mangina argus (Kollar, 1844)
- Mangina syringa (Cramer, 1775)
- Micraloa lineola (Fabriius, 1793)
- Micraloa emittens (Walker, 1855)
- Migoplastis correcta (Walker, 1865)
- Migoplastis alba (Moore, 1877)
- Miltochrista gratiosa Guérin-Méneville, 1843
- Mithuna fuscivena Hampson, 1891
- Narosodes punctana (Walker, 1863)
- Nepita conferta (Walker, 1854)
- Nishada flabrifera Moore, 1878
- Nudaria diaphanella (Hampson, 1893)
- Nyctemera adversata (Schaller, 1788)
- Nyctemera coleta (Stoll, 1781)
- Nyctemera lacticinia (Cramer, 1779)
- Nyctemera latistriga Walker, 1854
- Oeonistis entella (Cramer, 1779)
- Olepa anomi Orhant, 1986
- Olepa duboisi Orhant, 1986
- Olepa koslandana Orhant, 1986
- Olepa ocellifera (Walker, 1855)
- Olepa ricini (Fabricius, 1775)
- Padenia transversa (Walker, 1854)
- Pangora erosa (Walker, 1855)
- Pareuchaetes pseudoinsulata Régo Barros, 1956
- Poliosia binotata (Hampson, 1893)
- Pseudoblabes oophora Zeller, 1853
- Rajendra biguttata (Walker, 1855)
- Scaptesyle bicolor Walker, 1864
- Schistophleps bipuncta Hampson, 1891
- Siccia guttulosana (Walker, 1863)
- Siccia minima Hampson, 1900
- Siccia nilgirica Hampson, 1891
- Siccia sordida (Butler, 1877)
- Siccia tau (Heylaerts, 1891)
- Spilarctia albicornis (Hampson, 1900)
- Spilarctia castanea (Hampson, 1893)
- Spilarctia eldorado (Rothschild, 1910)
- Spilosoma melanopsis (Walker, 1865)
- Spilosoma obliqua (Walker, 1855)
- Stictane fractilinea (Snellen, 1880)
- Stictane obliquilinea Hampson, 1900
- Stictane fusca (Hamson, 1901)
- Syntomoides imaon (Cramer, 1779)
- Tatargina ceylonensis (Hampson, 1901)
- Teulisna tumida (Walker, 1862)
- Thumatha fuscescens Walker, 1866
- Thumatha orientalis Holloway, 2001
- Trischalis absconditana (Walker, 1863)
- Utetheisa lotrix (Cramer, 1777)
- Utetheisa pulchelloides Hampson, 1907
- Utriculofera fuscapex Hampson, 1893
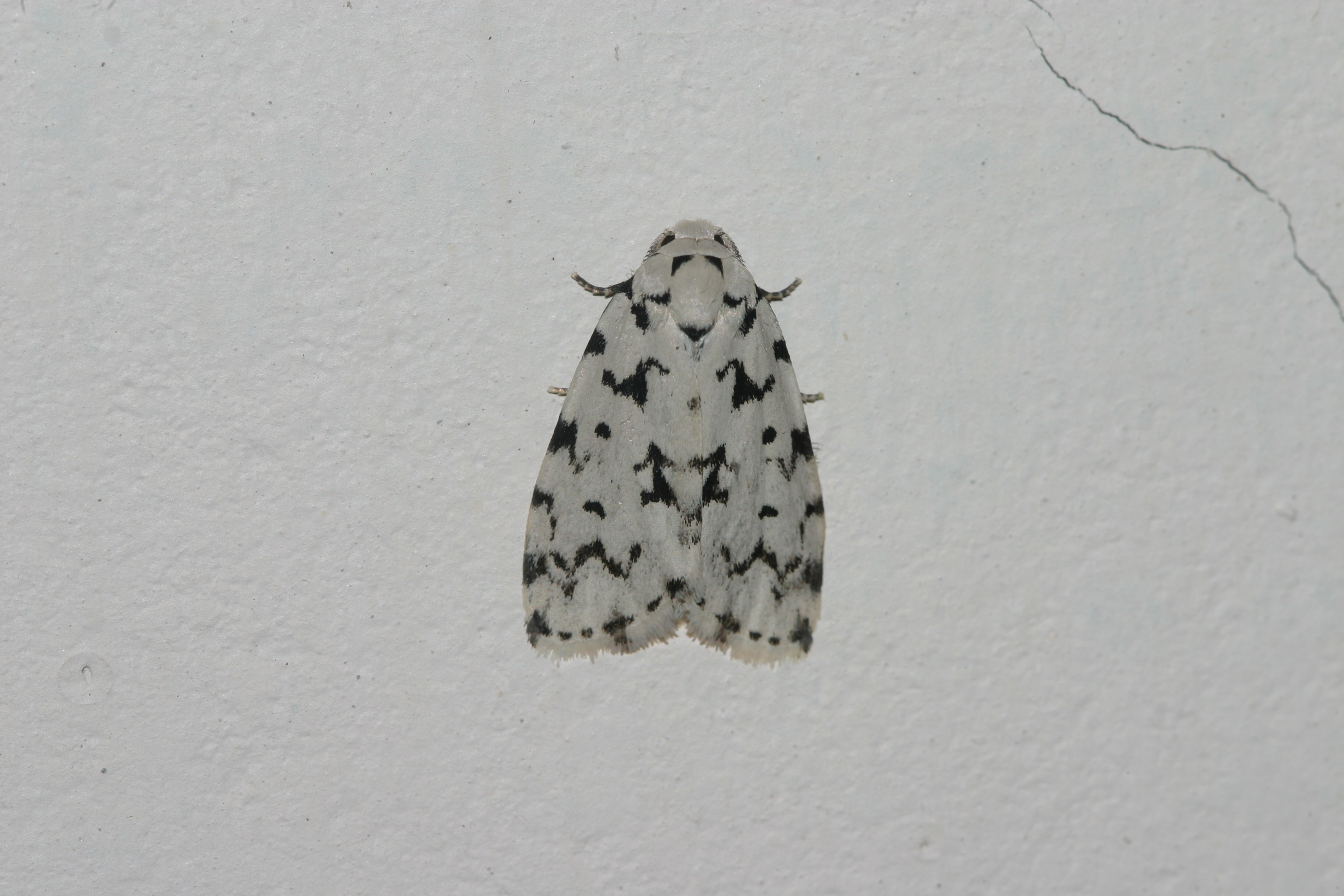
Aemene taprobanis

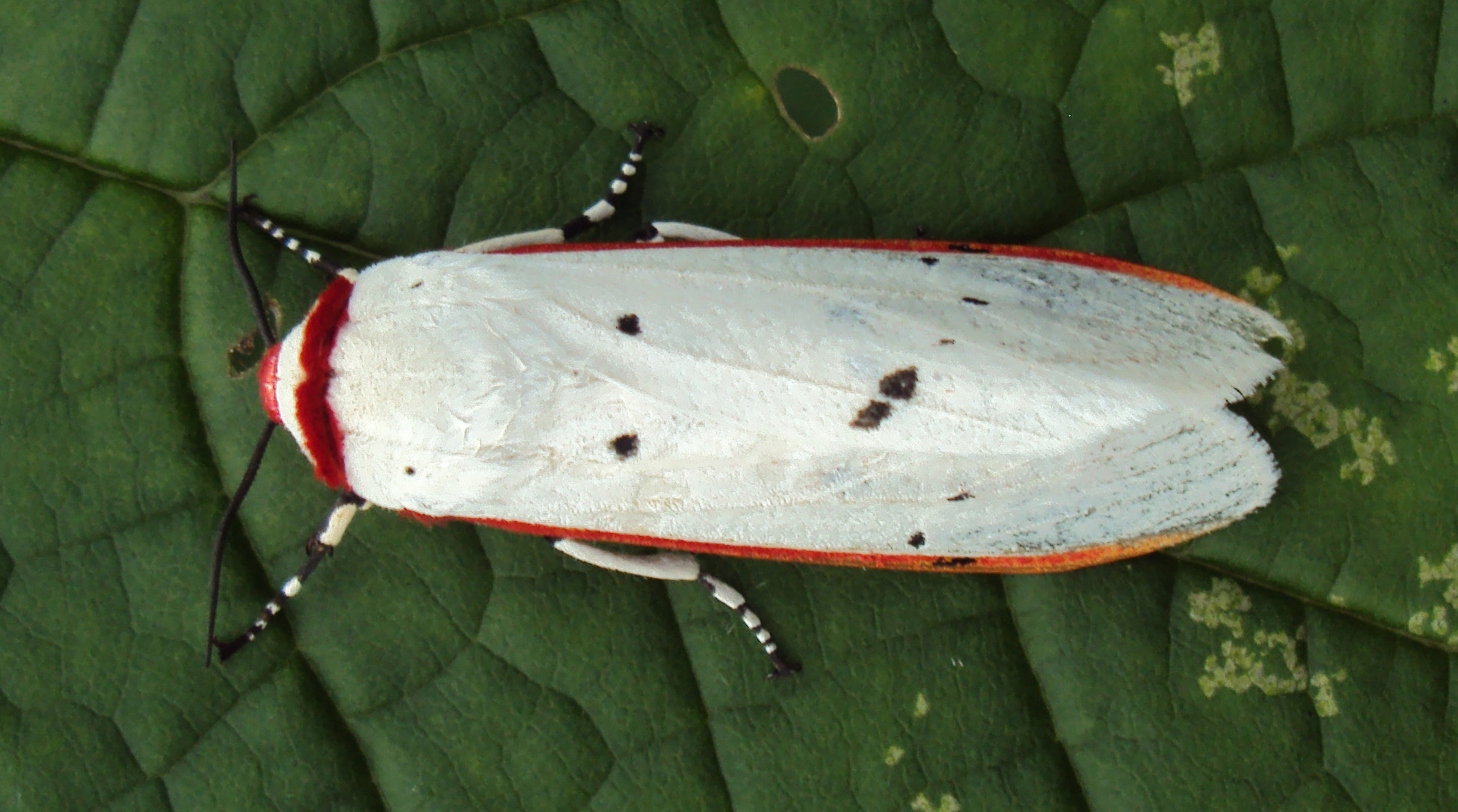
Aloa lactinea

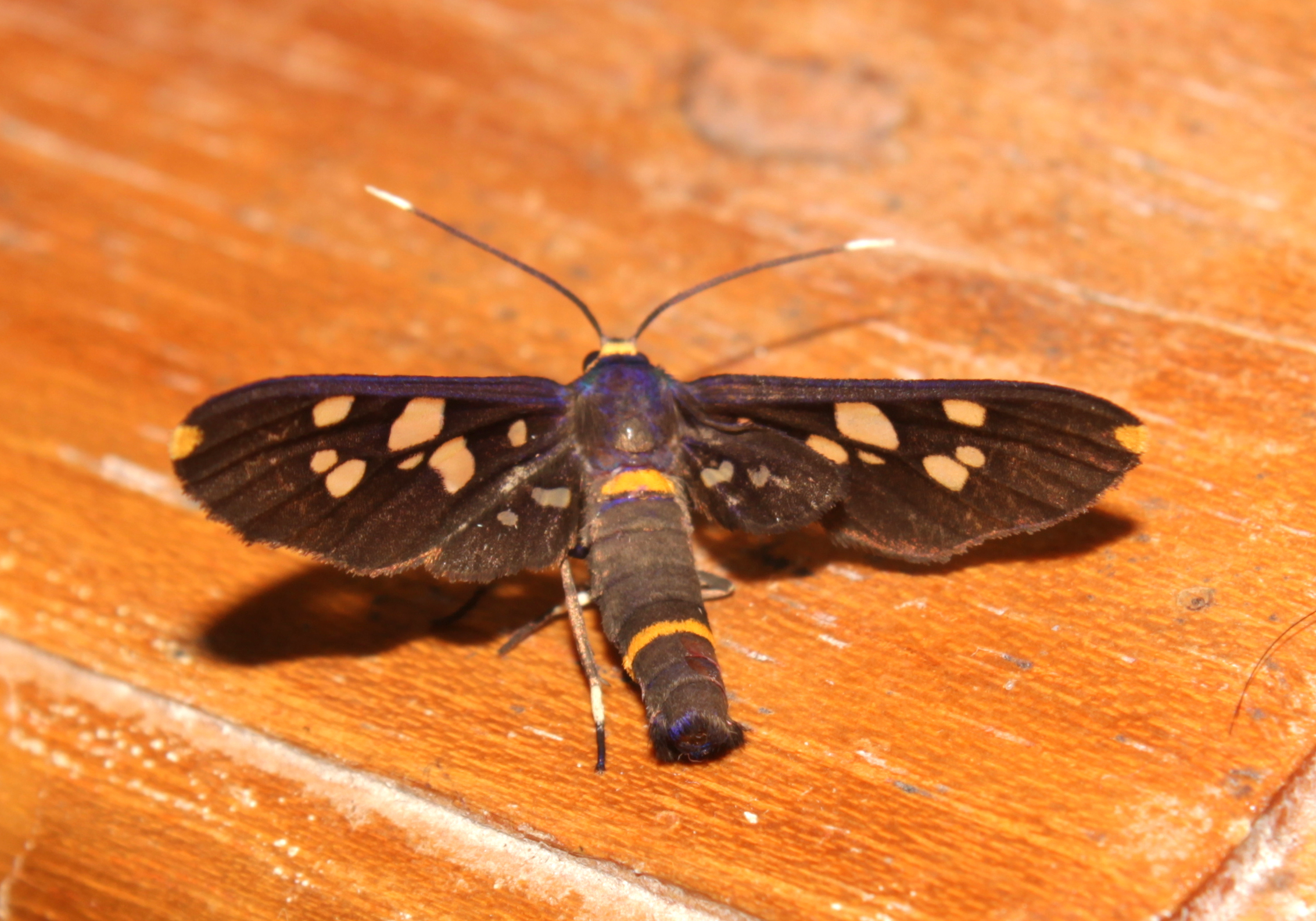
Amata cyssea

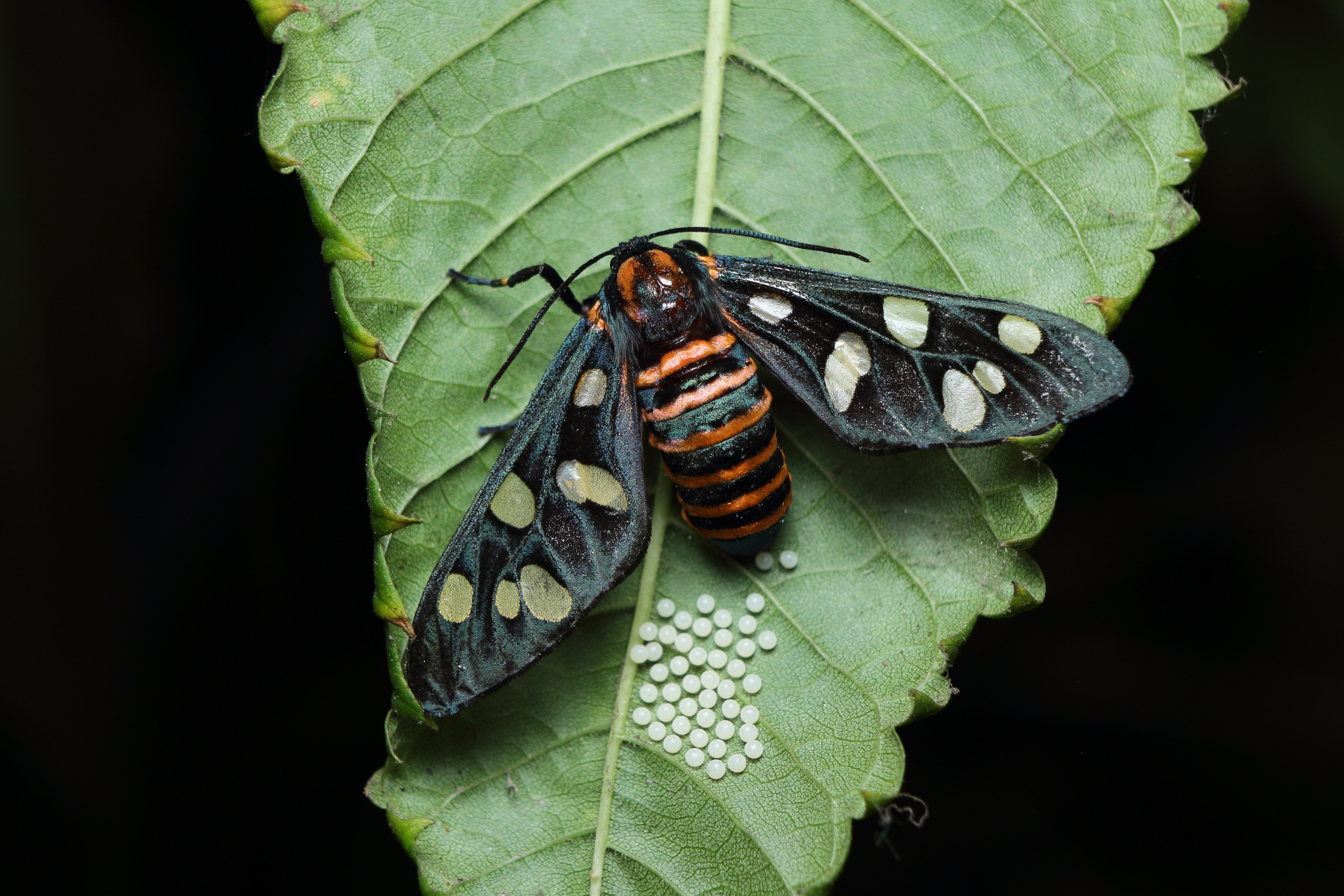
Amata passalis

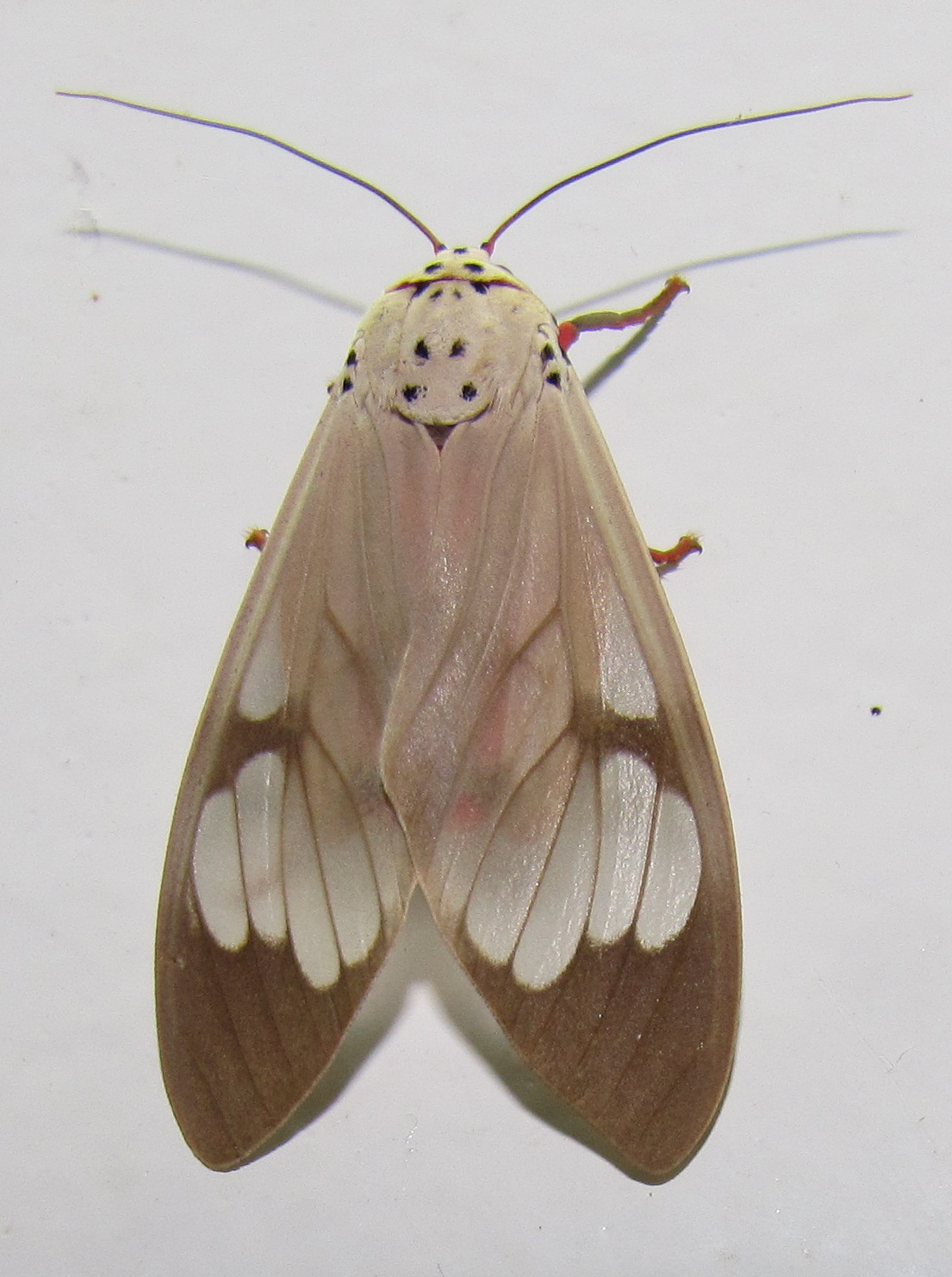
Amerila astreus

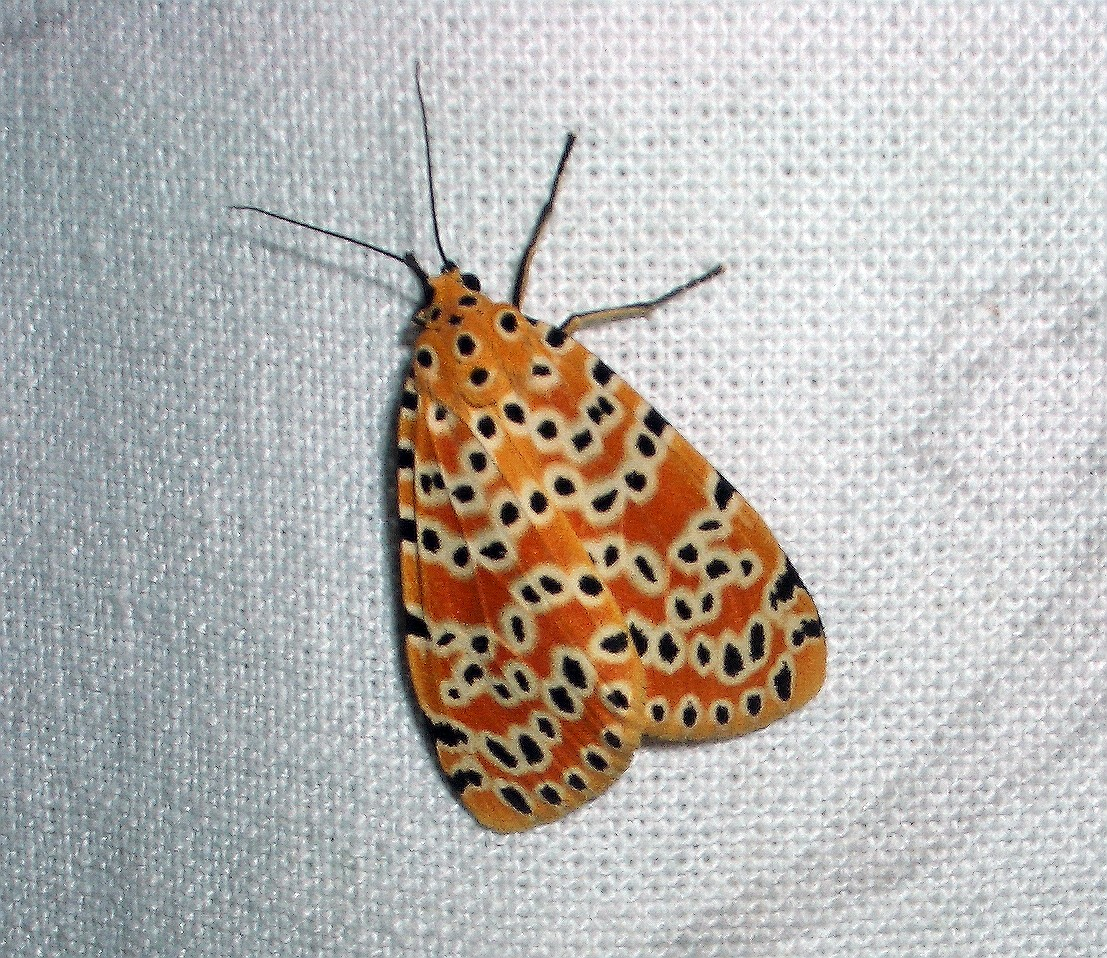
Argena astrea

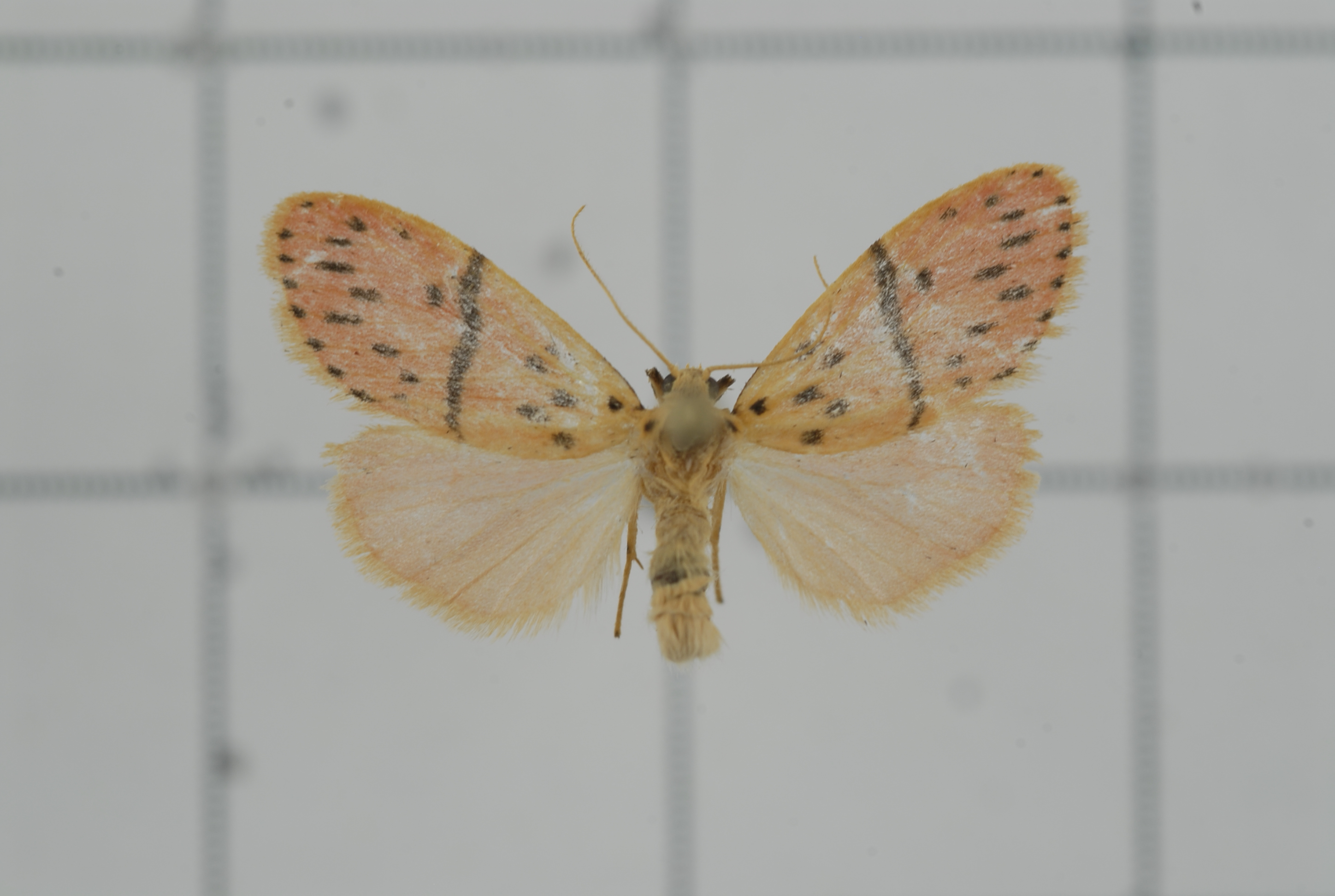
Asura arcuata

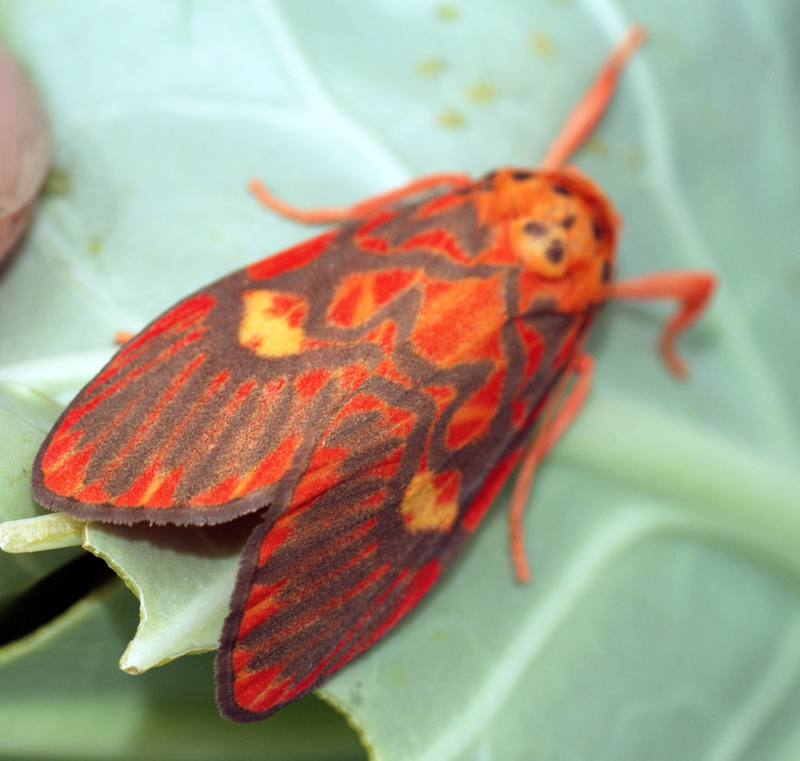
Barsine cuneonotata

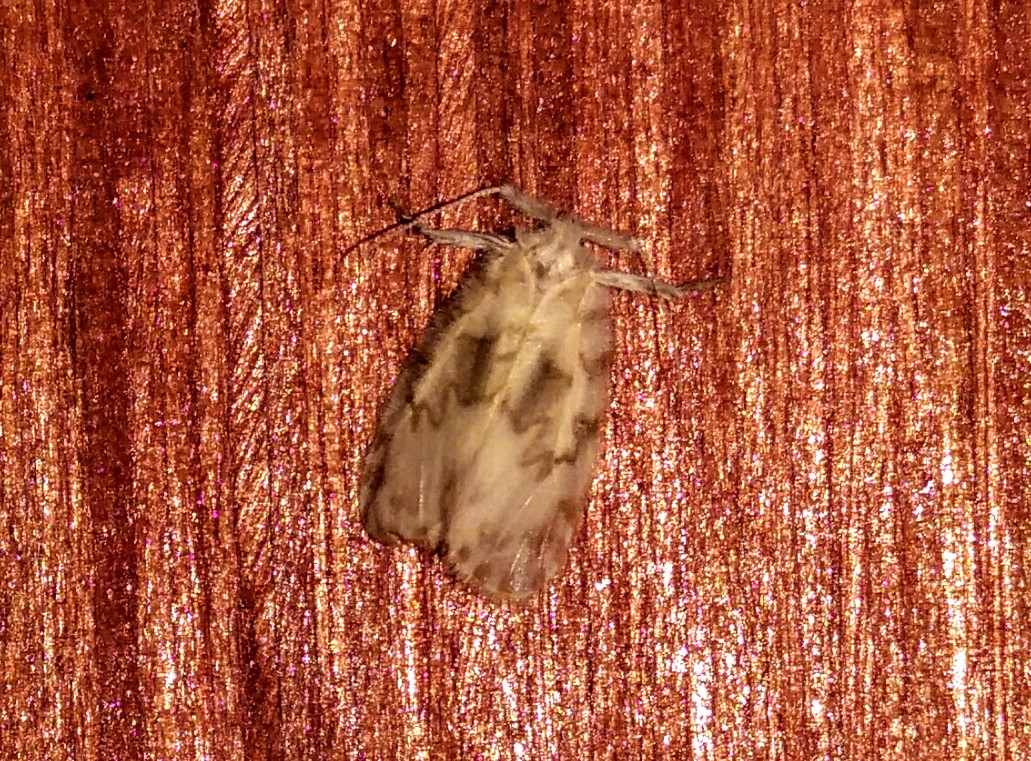
Chamaita nympha

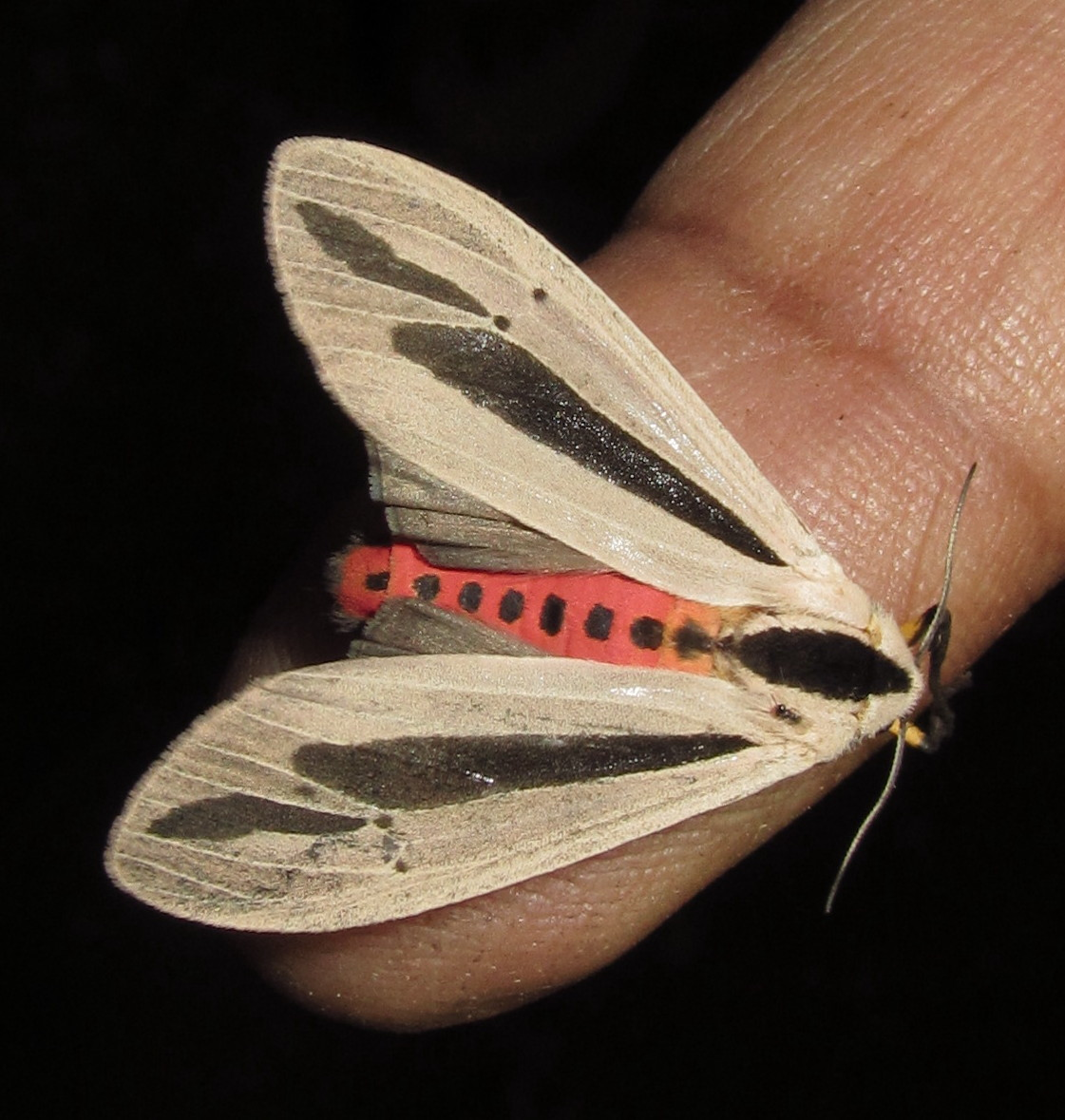
Creatonotos gangis

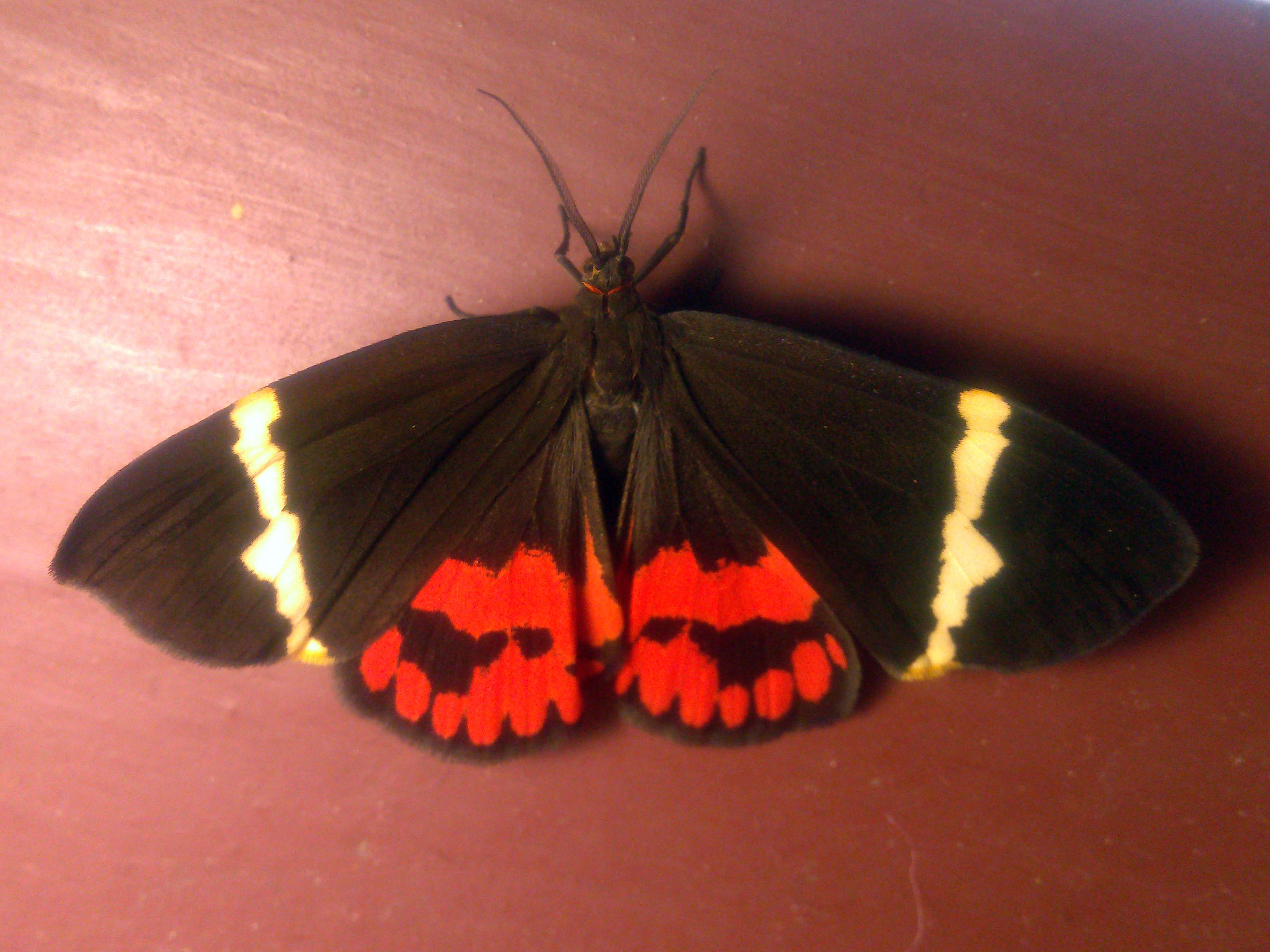
Curoba sangarida

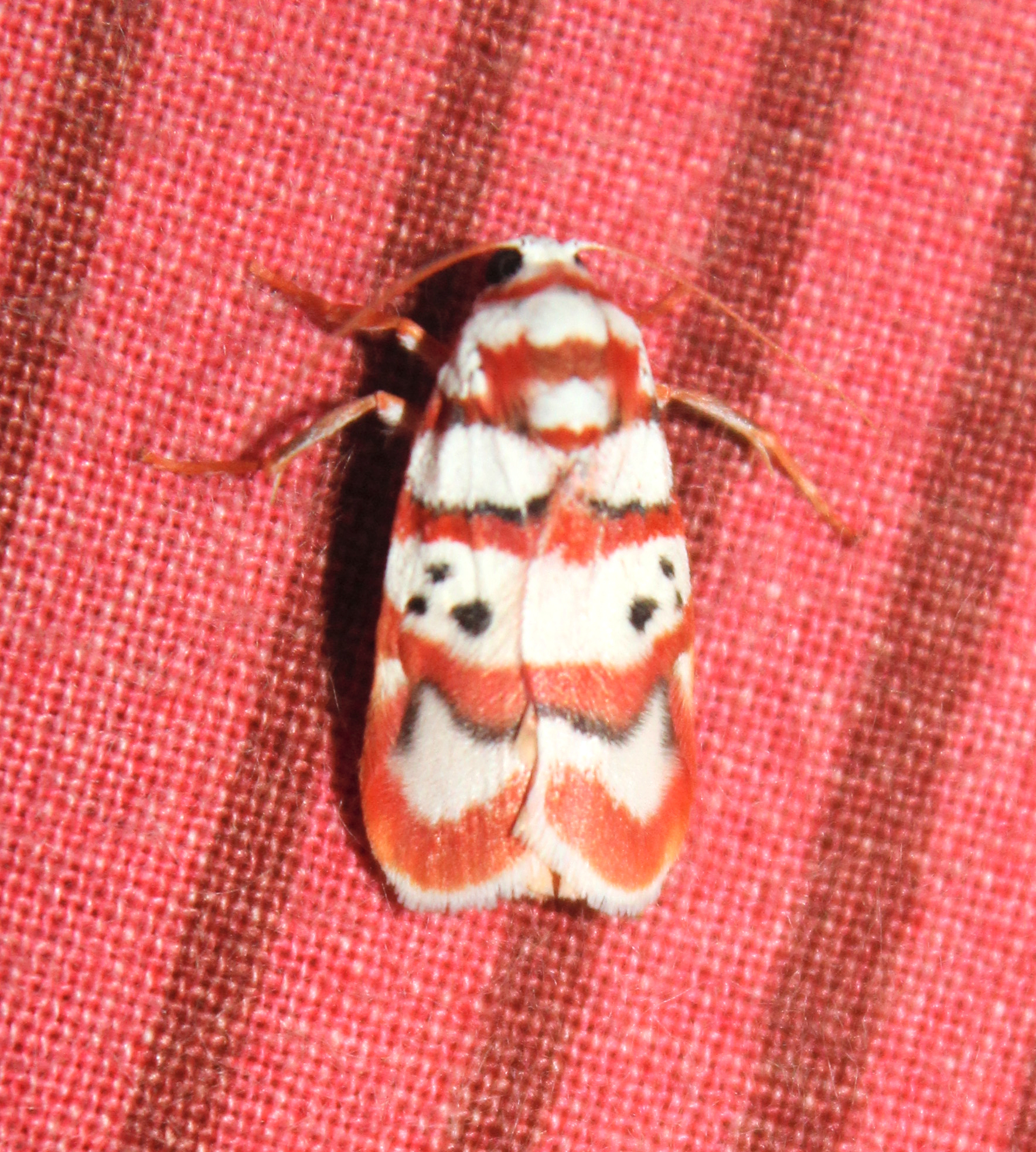
Cyana peregrina

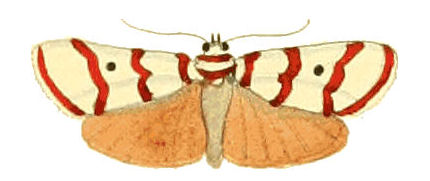
Cyana puella

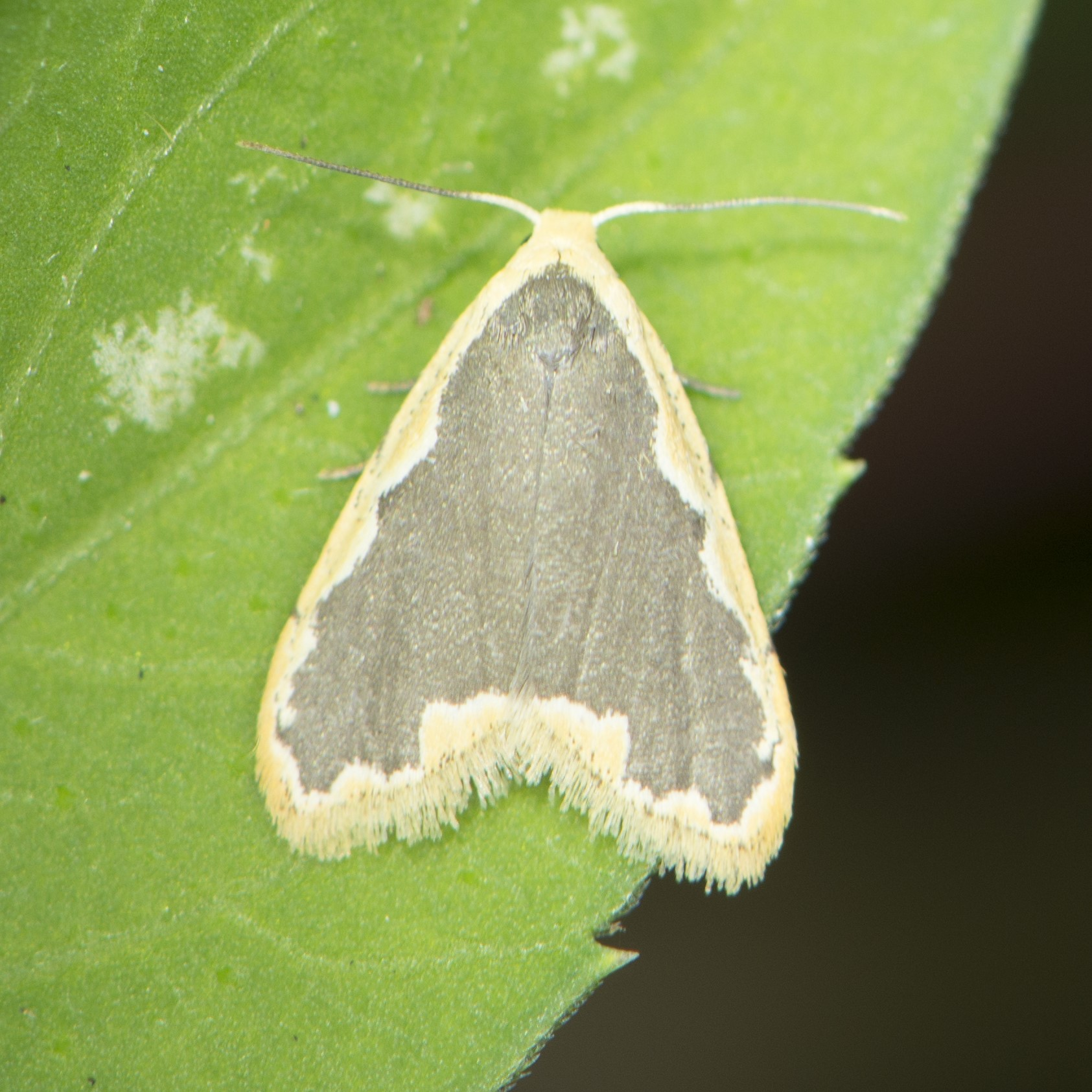
Diduga flavicostata

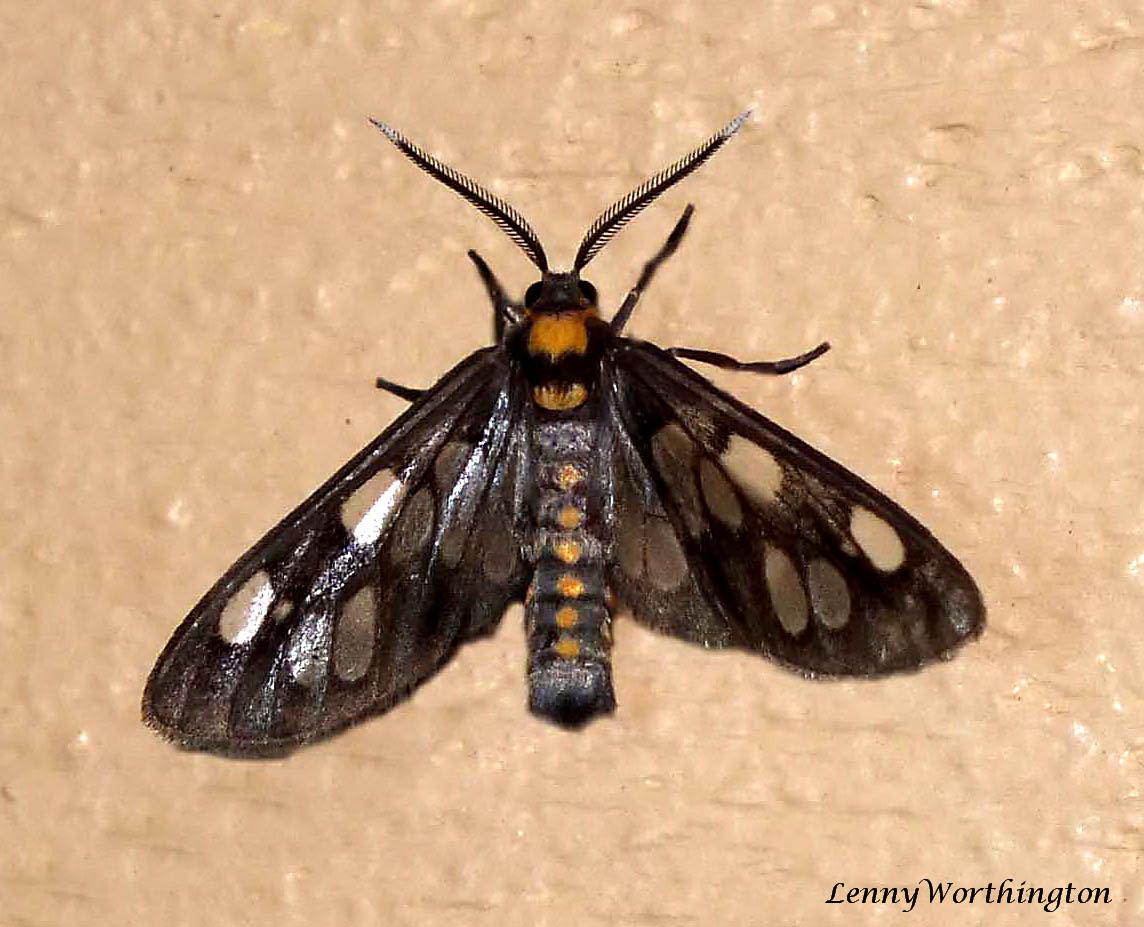
Eressa confinis

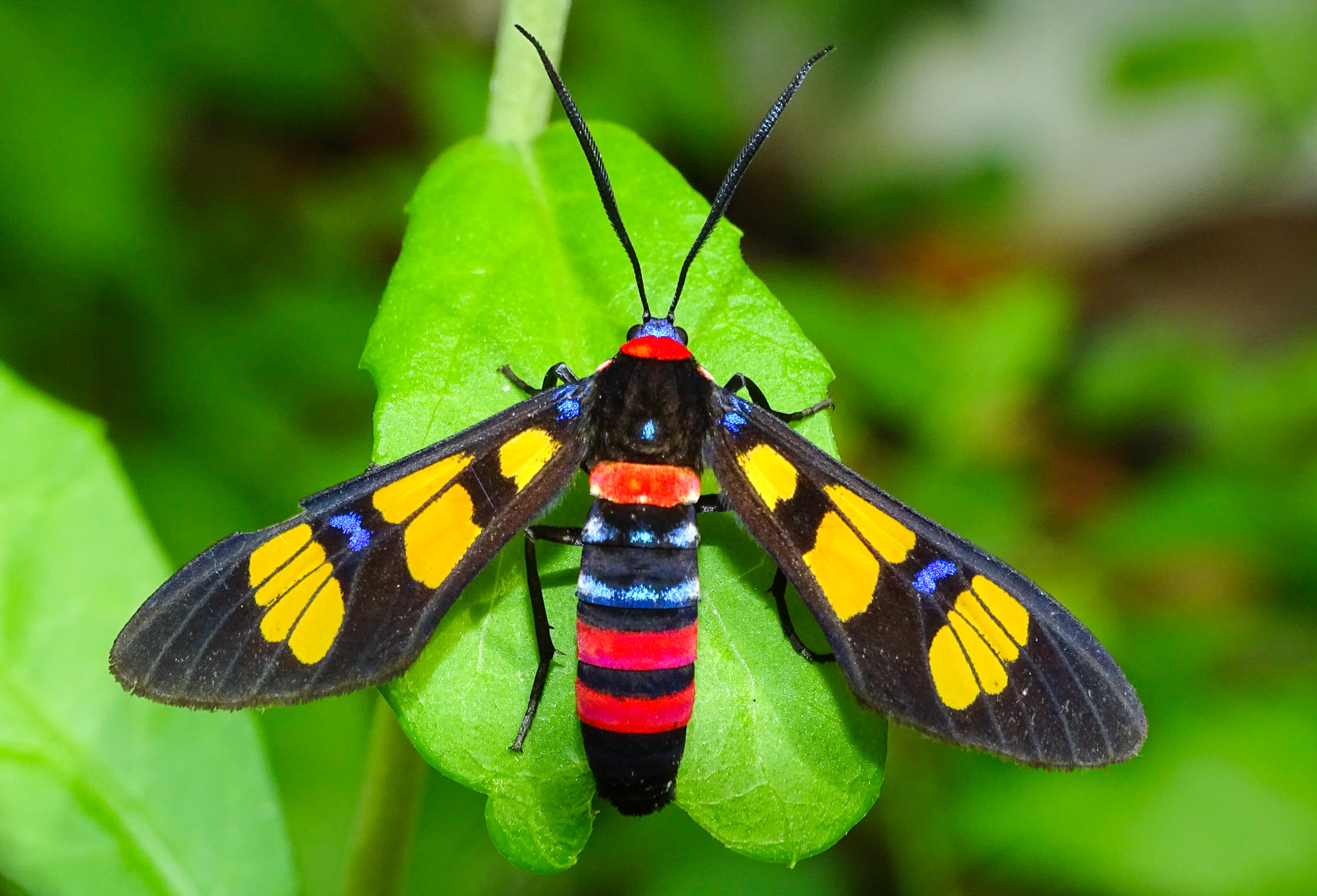
Euchromia polymena

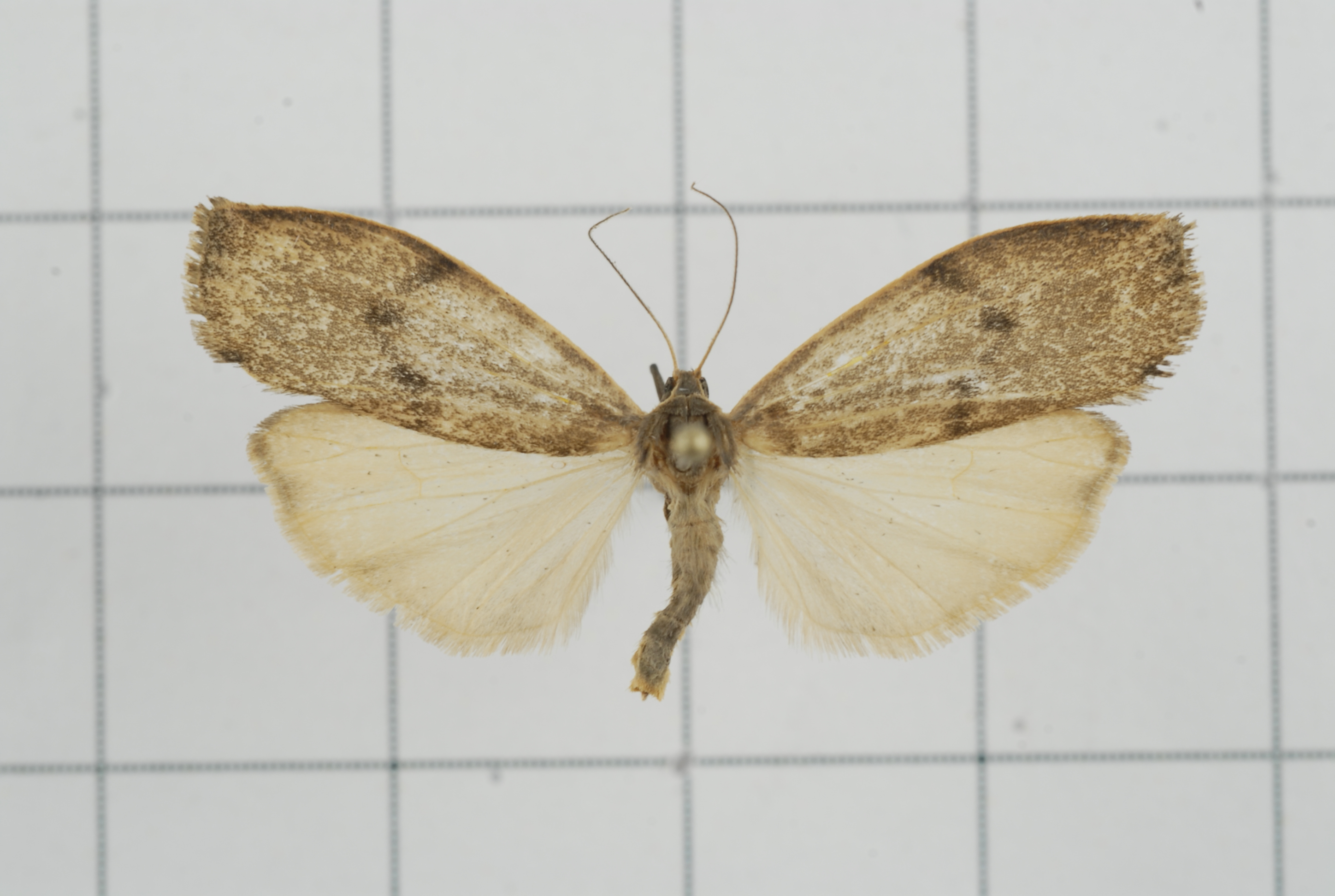
Gampola fasciata

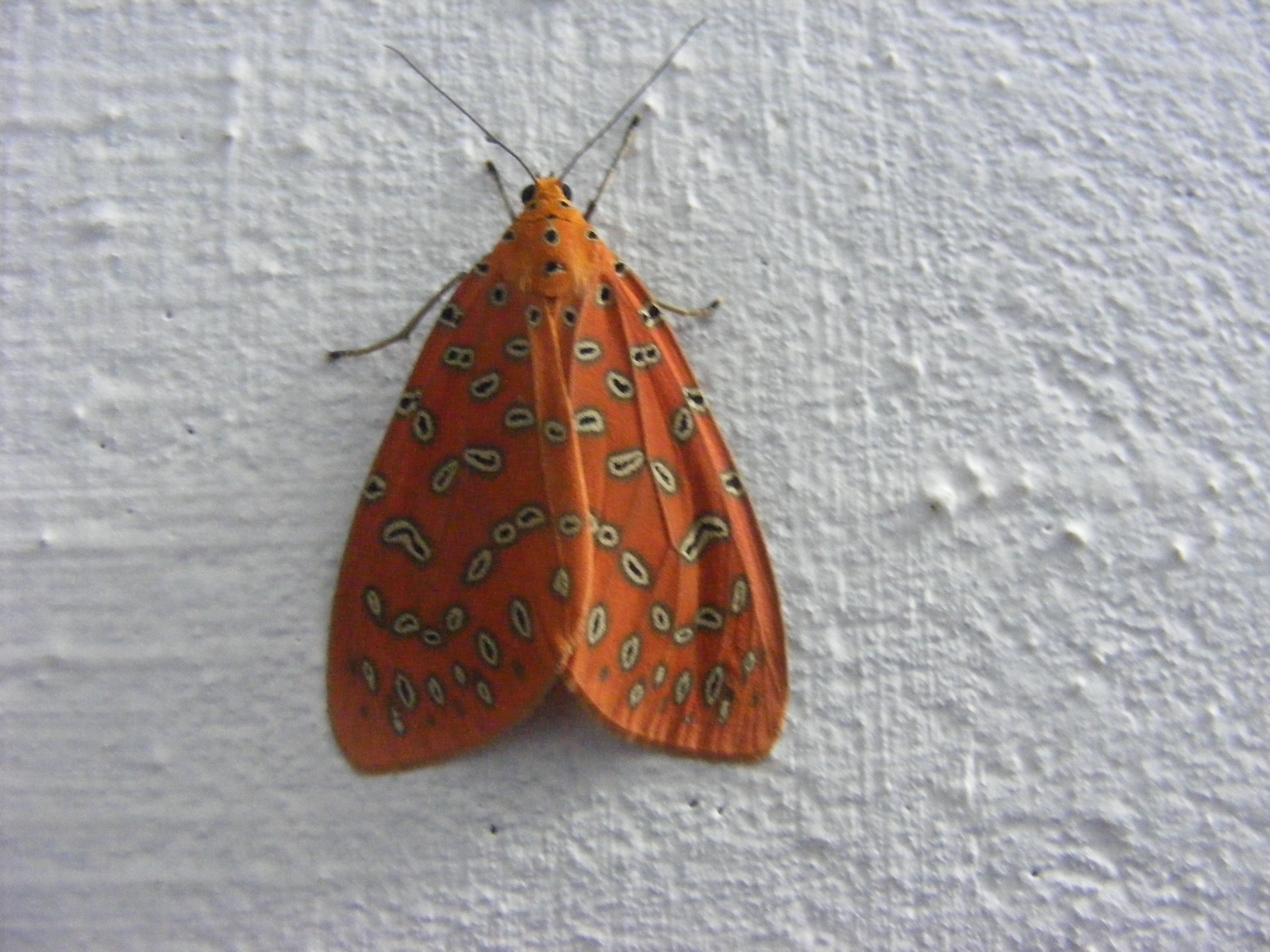
Mangina argus

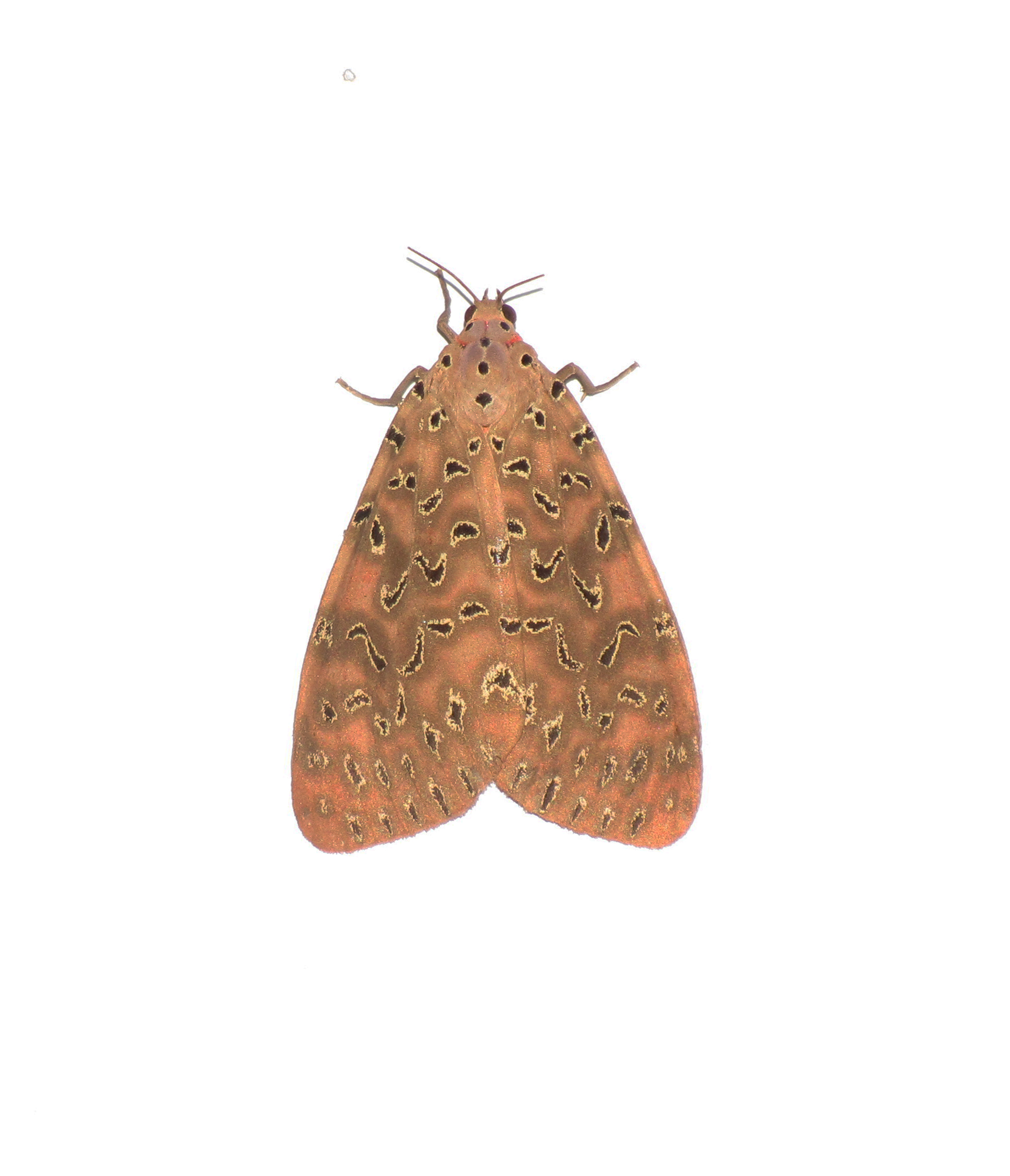
Mangina syringa

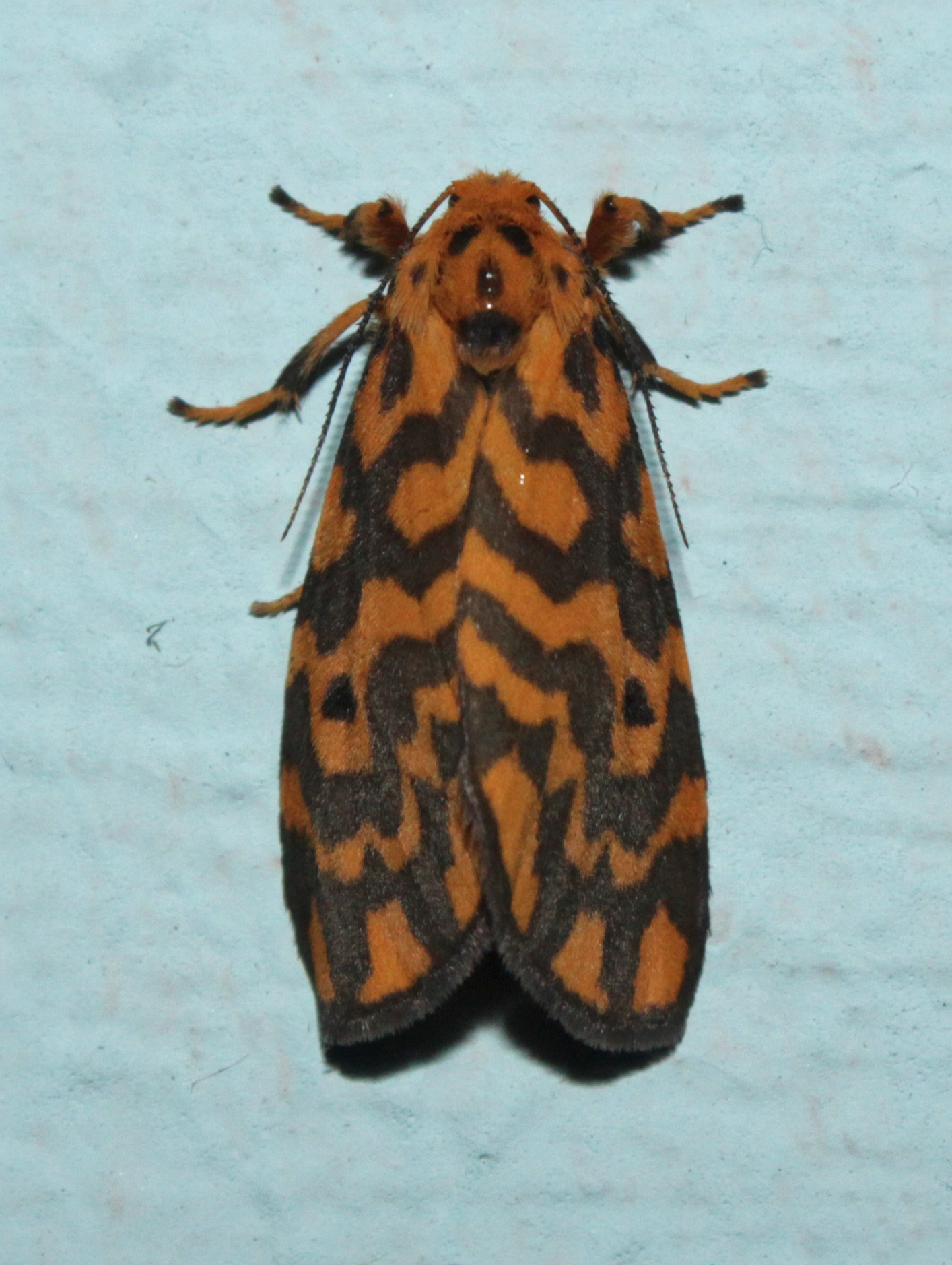
Nepita conferta

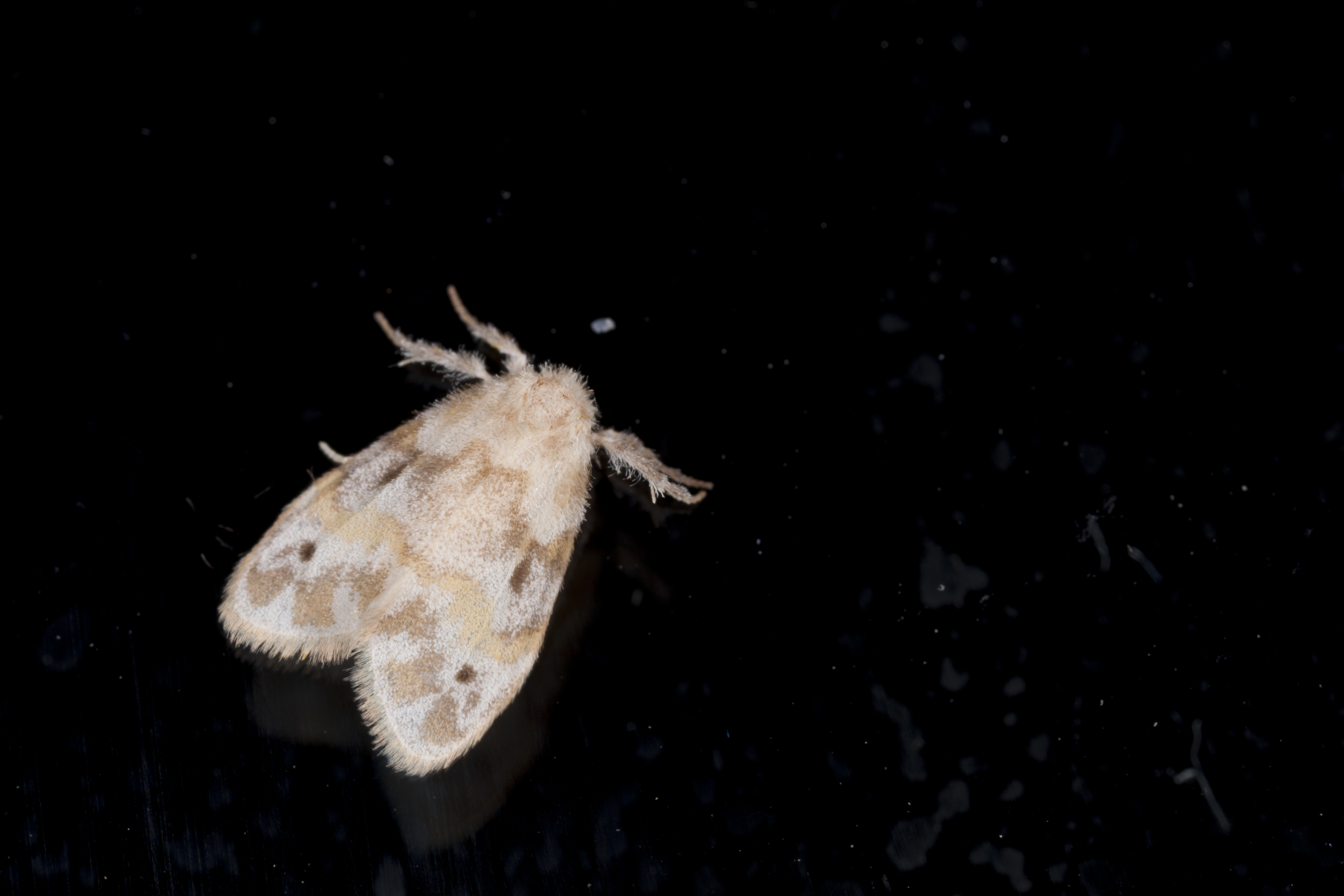
Nudaria diaphanella

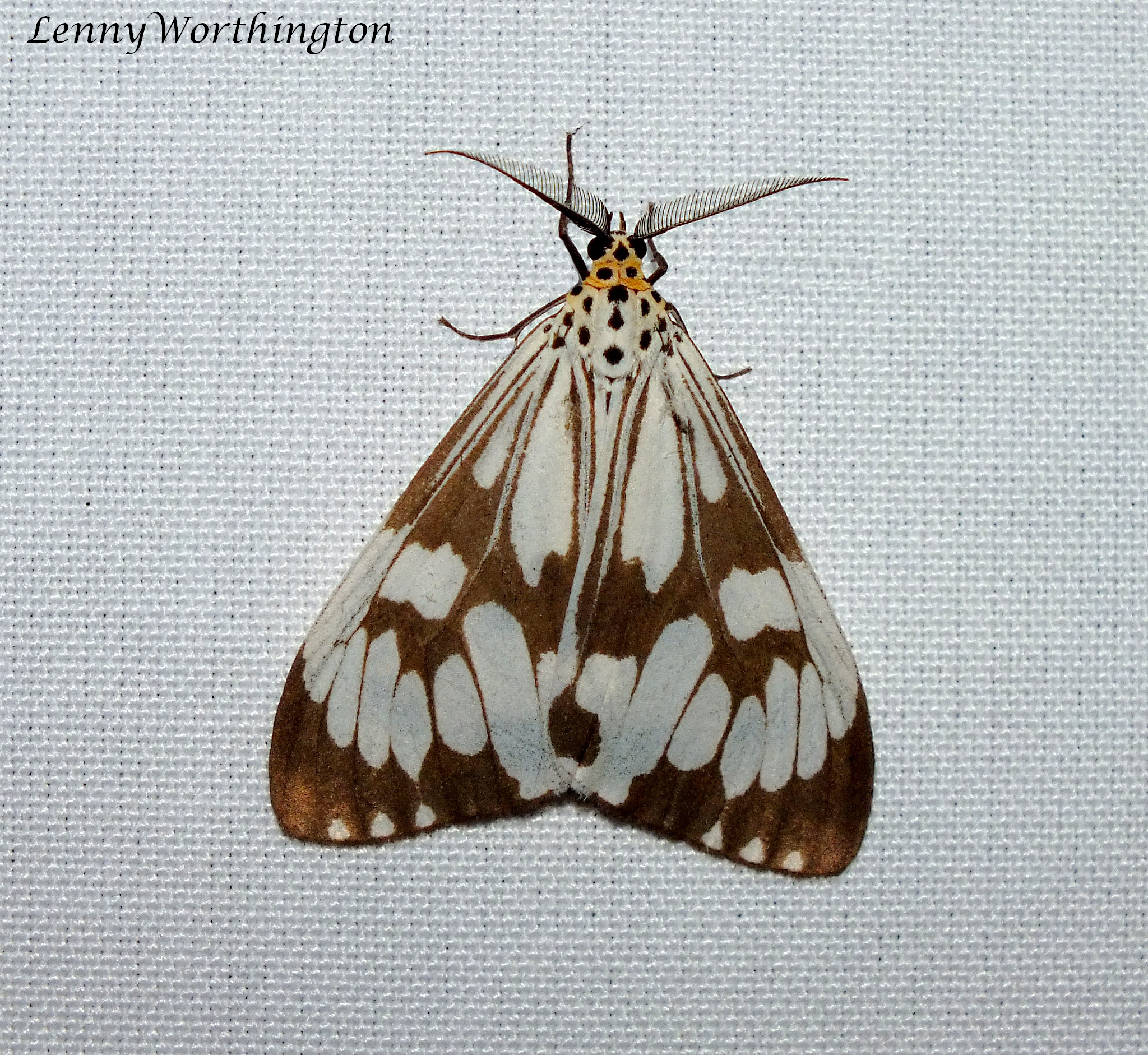
Nyctemera adversata

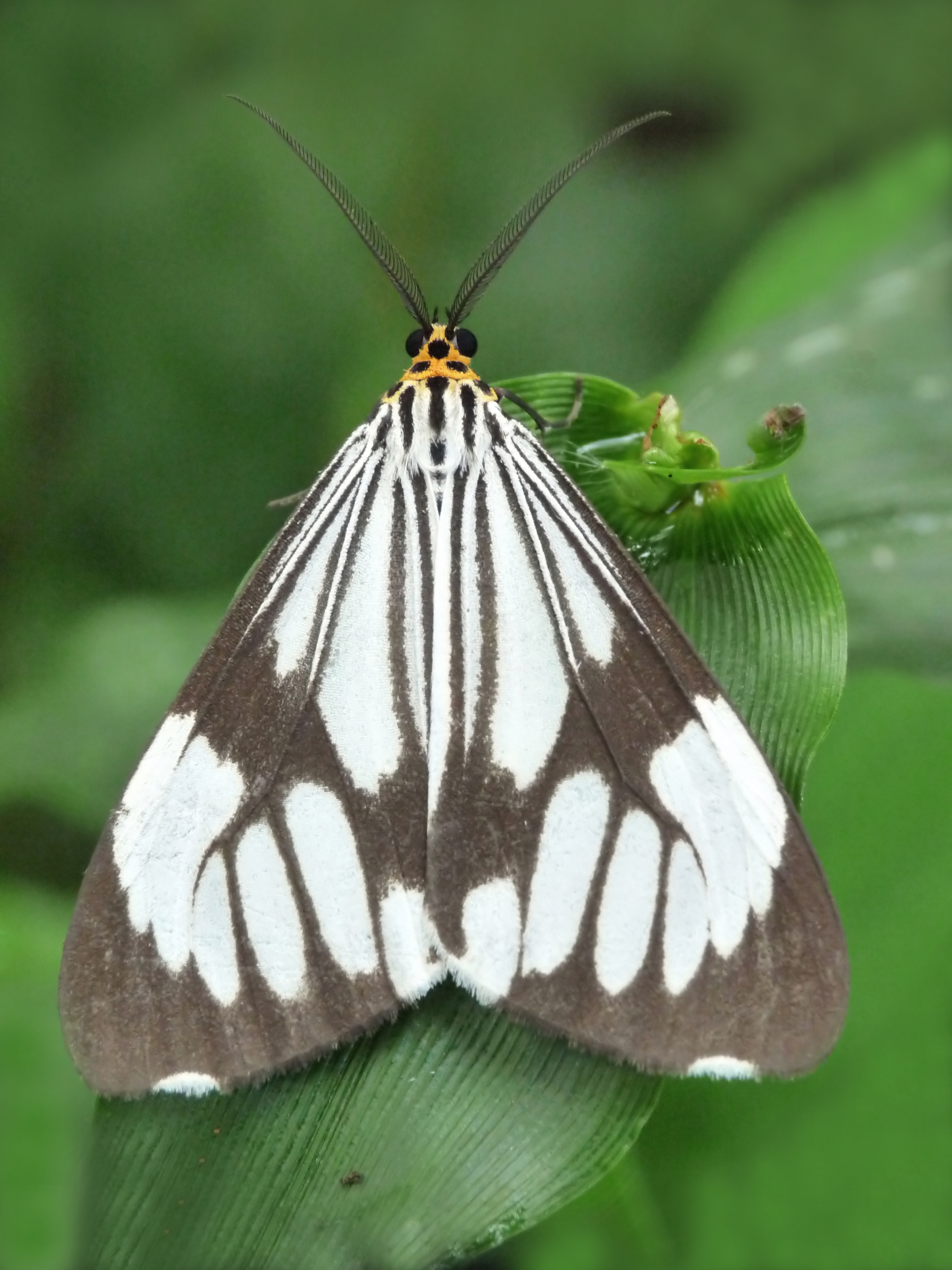
Nyctemera coleta

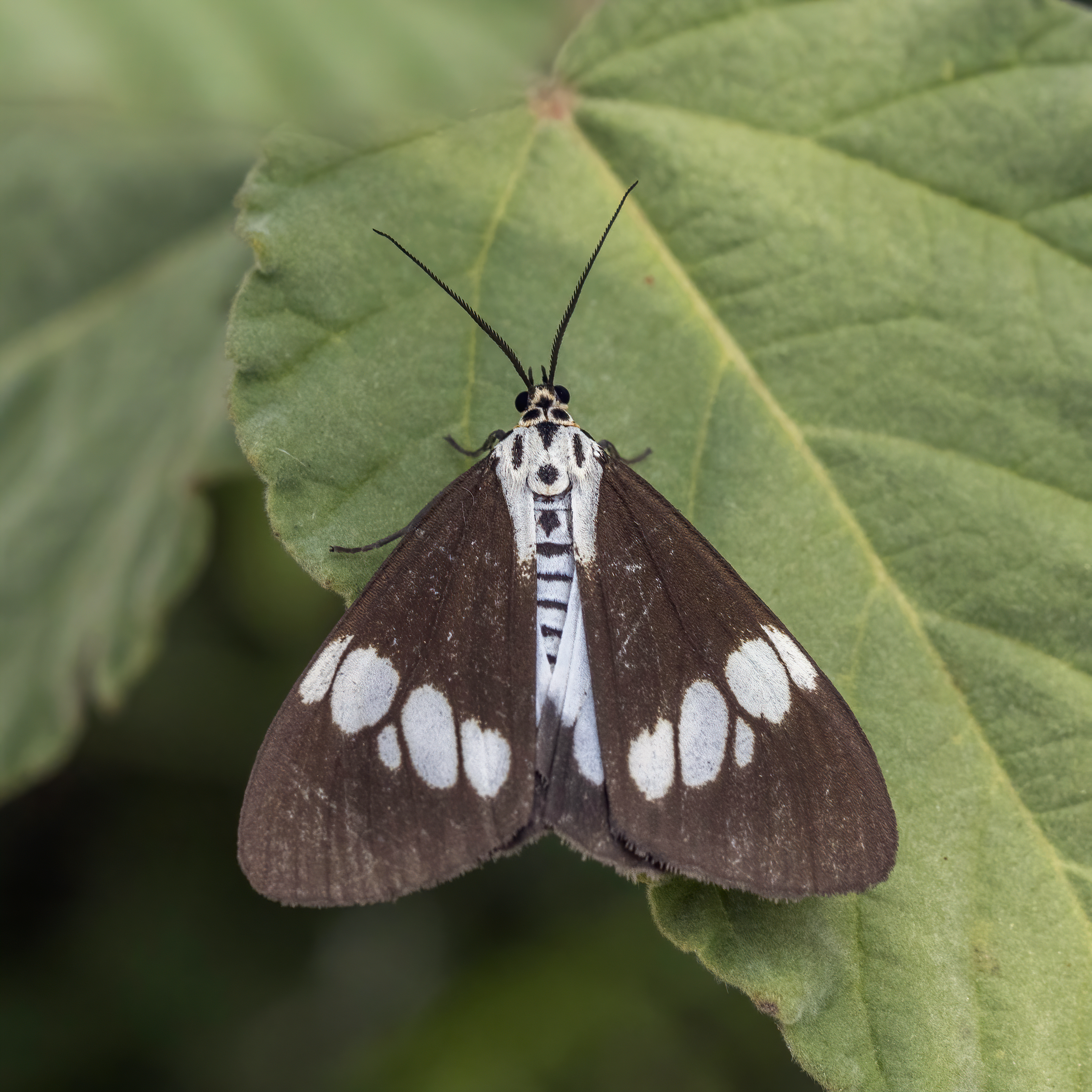
Nyctemera lacticinia

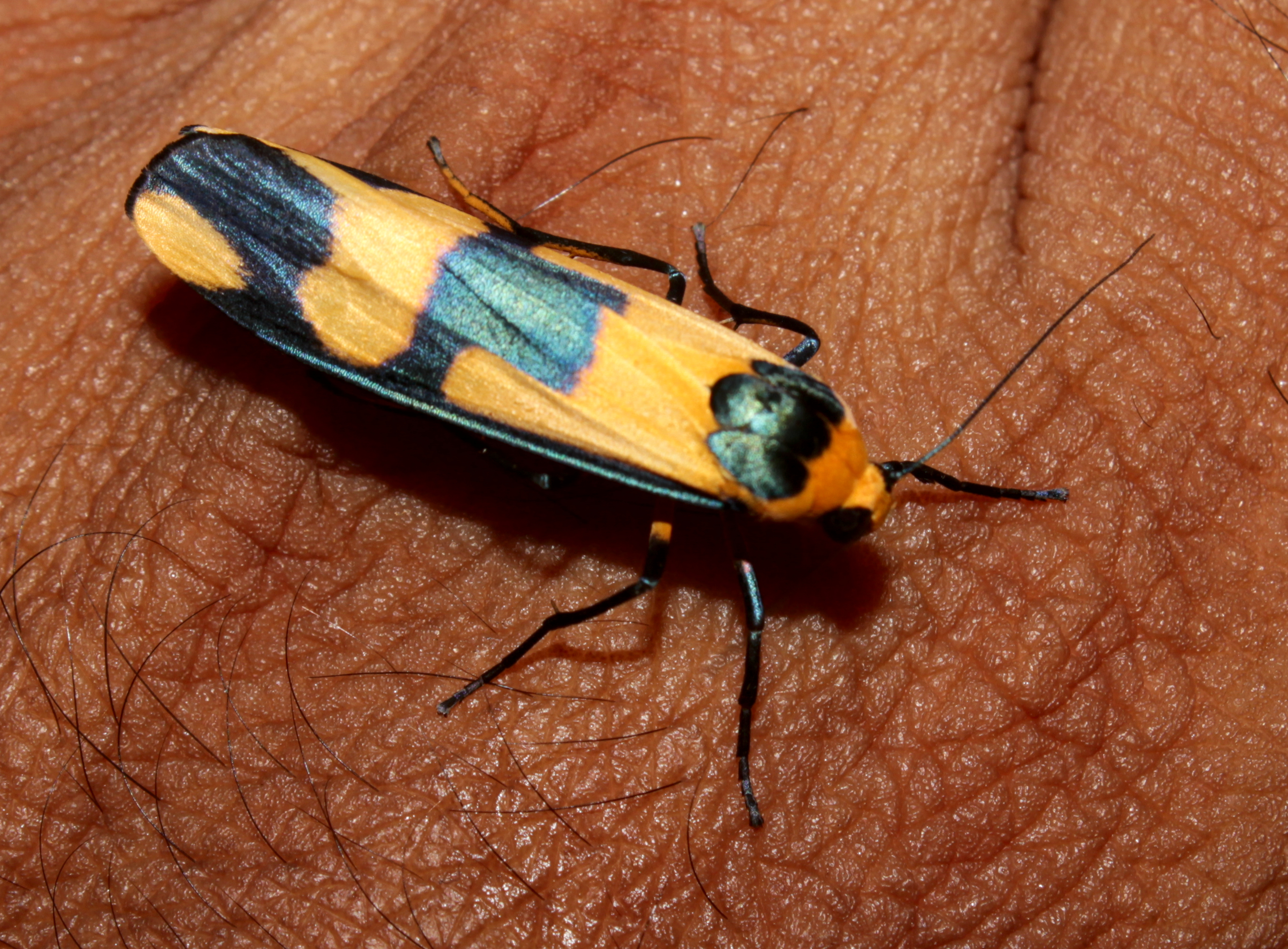
Oeonistis entella

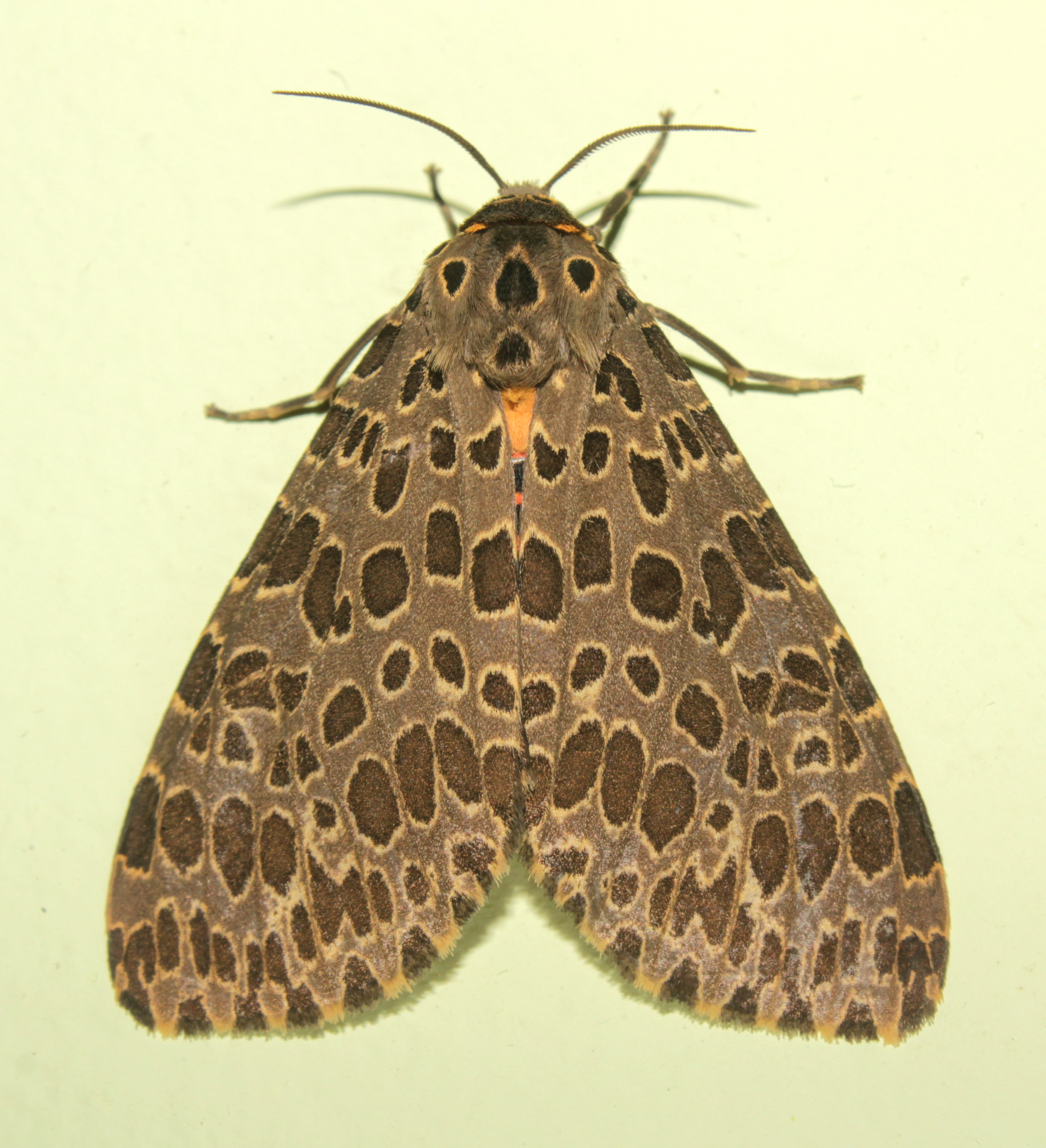
Olepa ocellifera

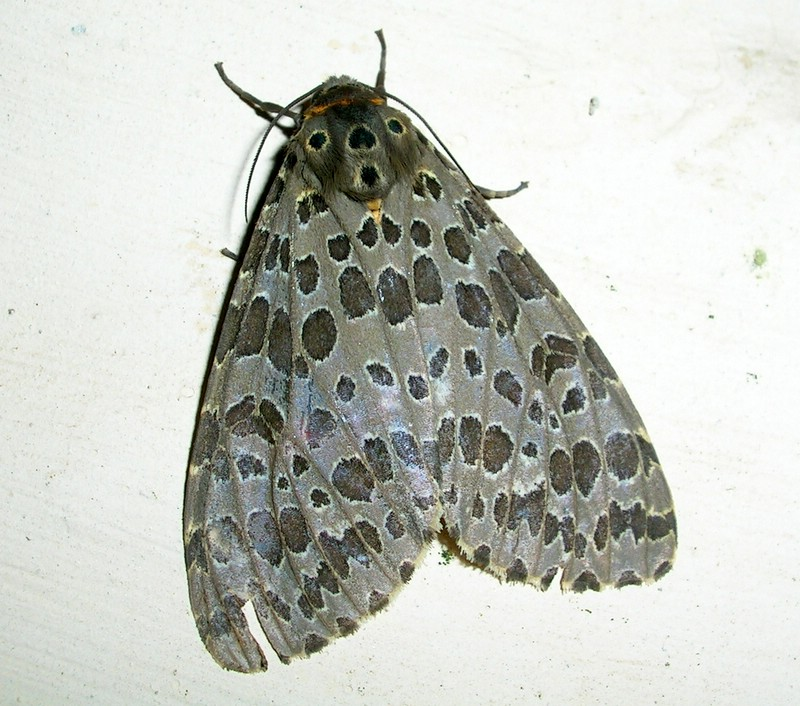
Olepa ricini

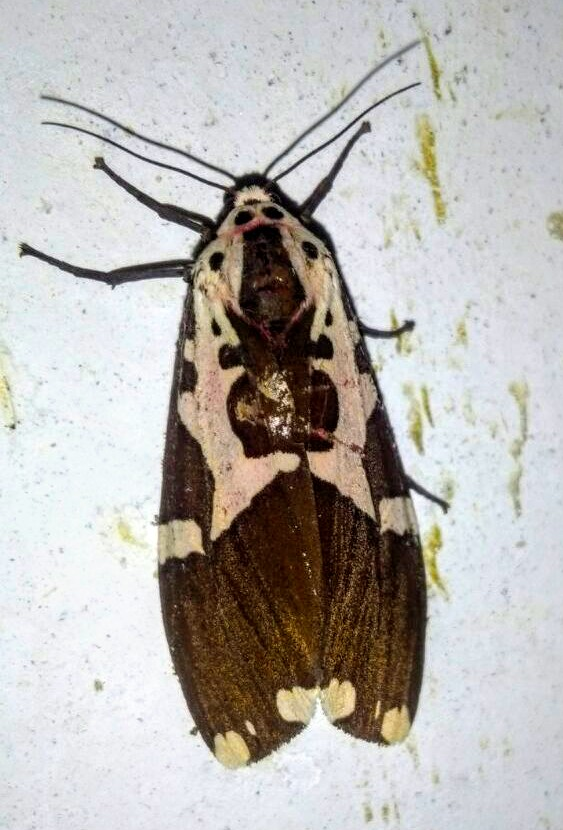
Pangora erosa

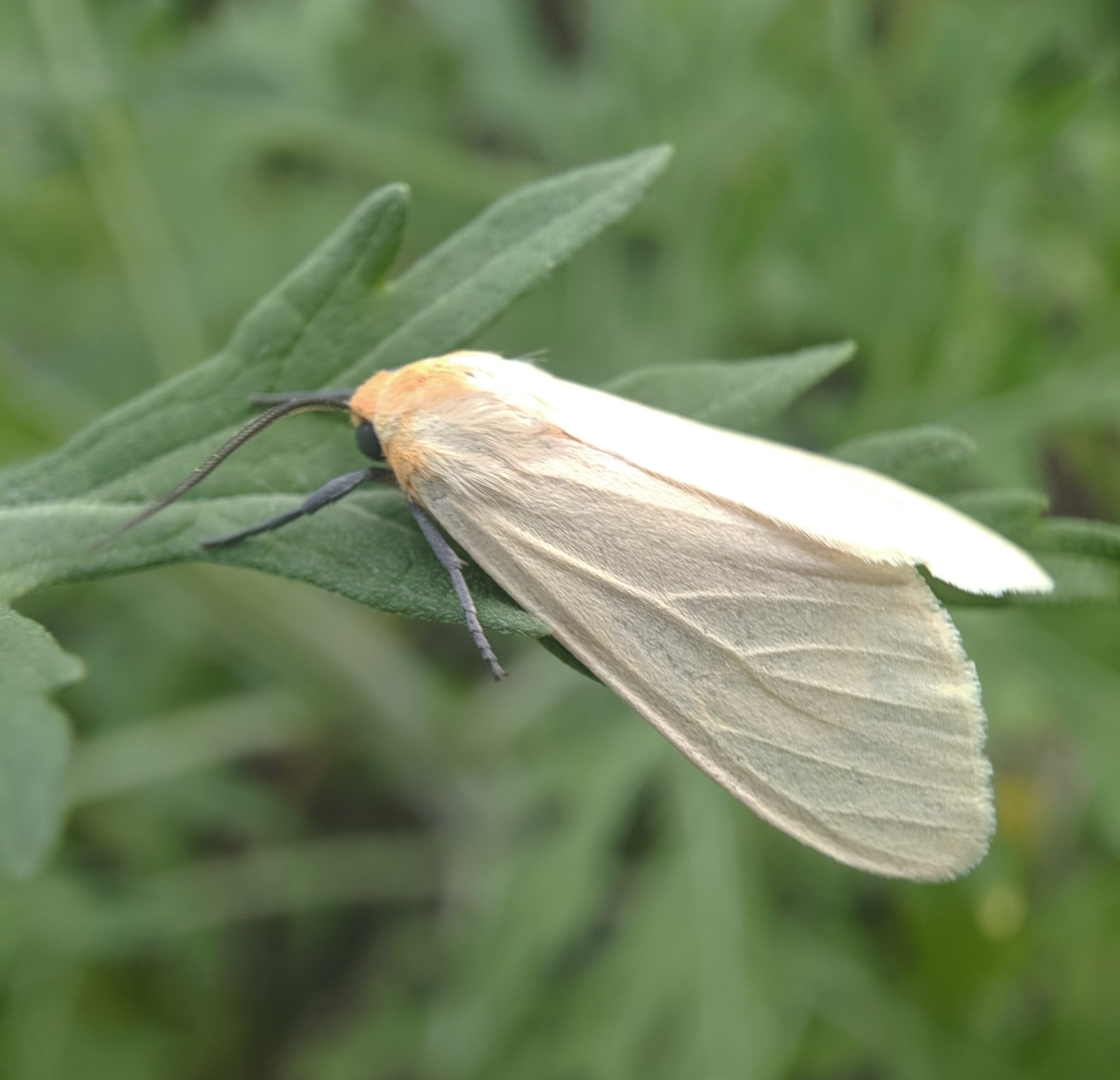
Pareuchaetes pseudoinsulata

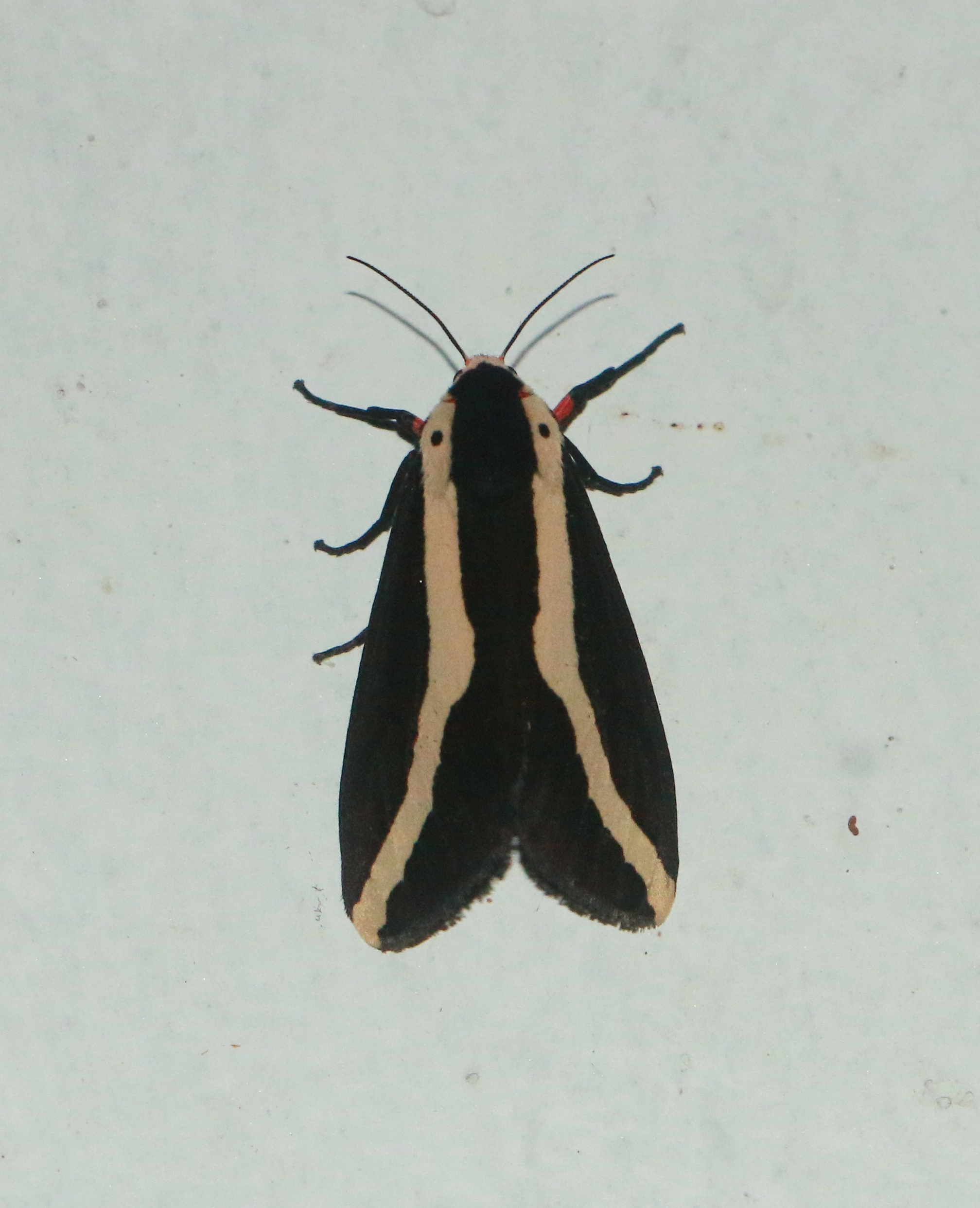
Rajendra biguttata

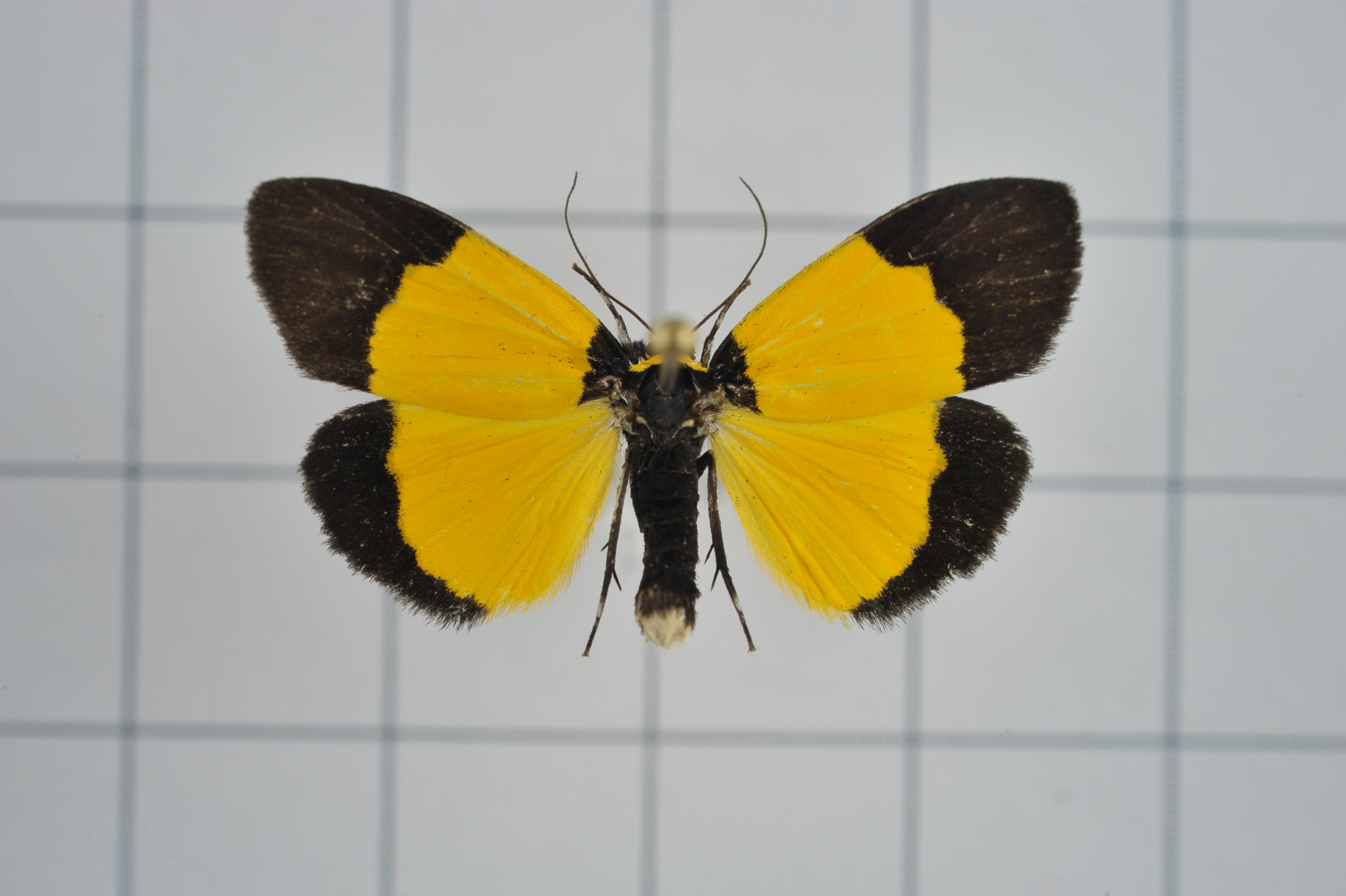
Scaptesyle bicolor

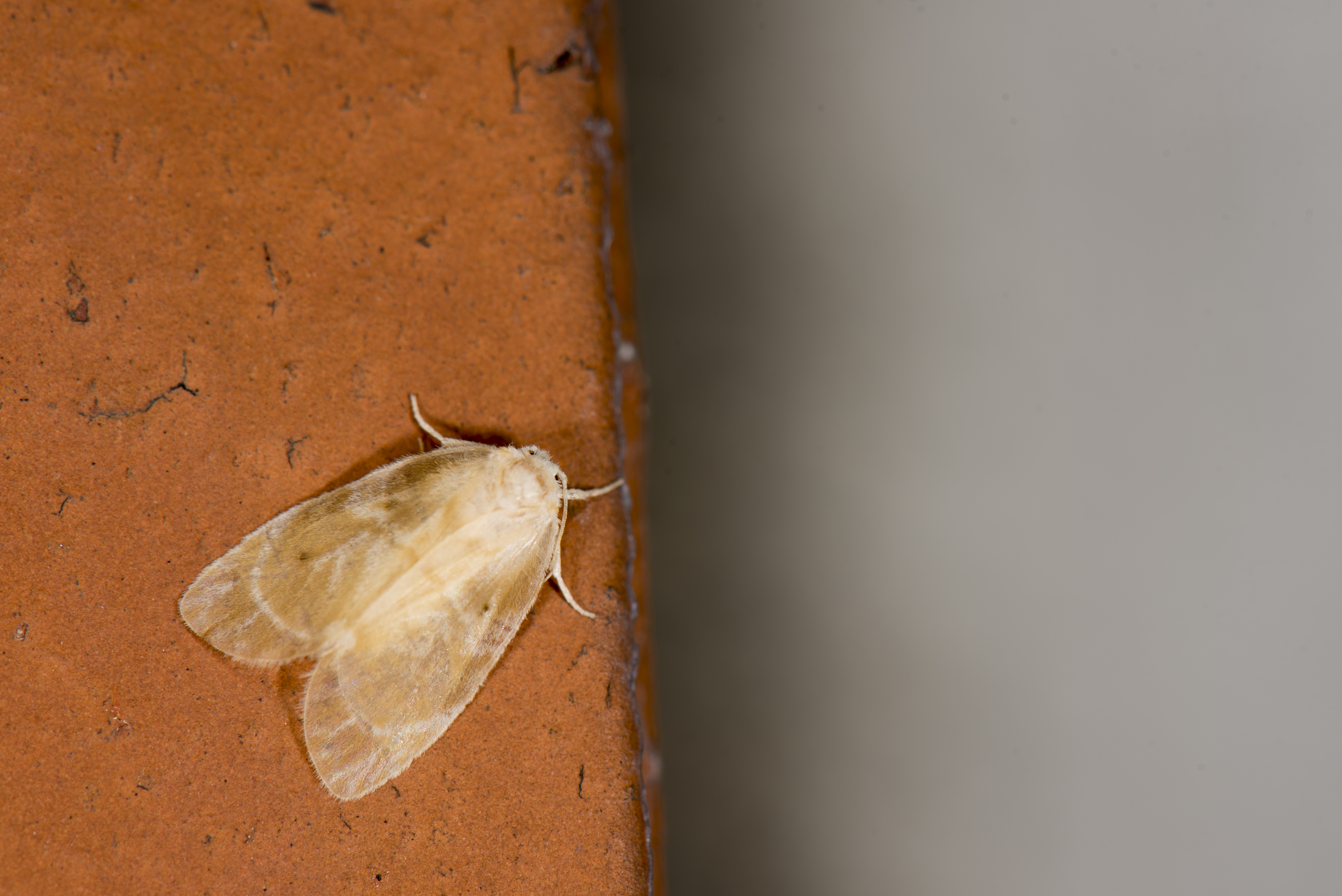
Schistophleps bipuncta

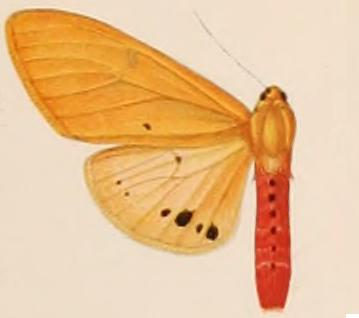
Spilarctia eldorado male

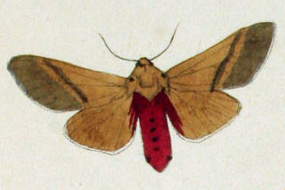
Spilosoma melanopsis

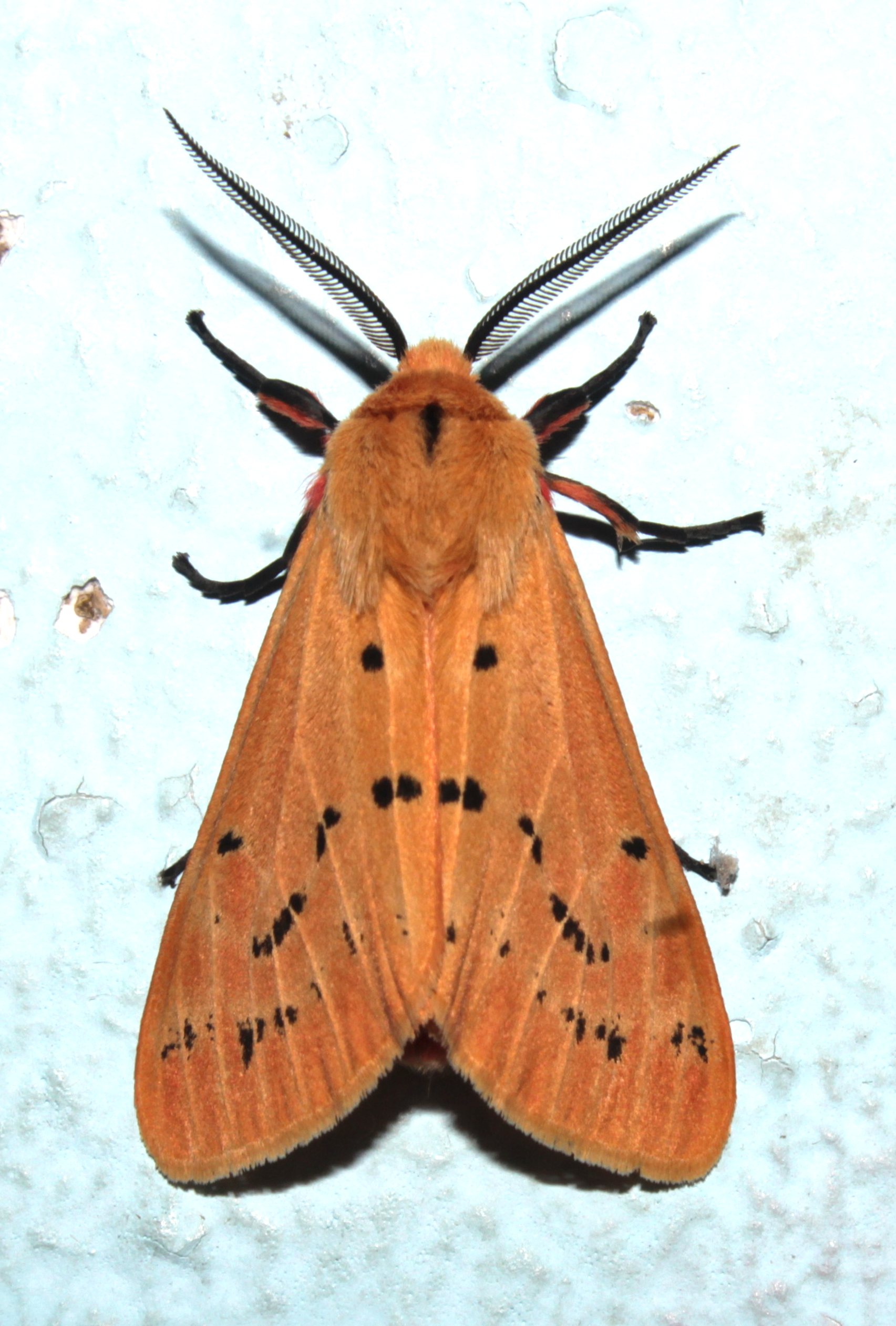
Spilosoma obliqua

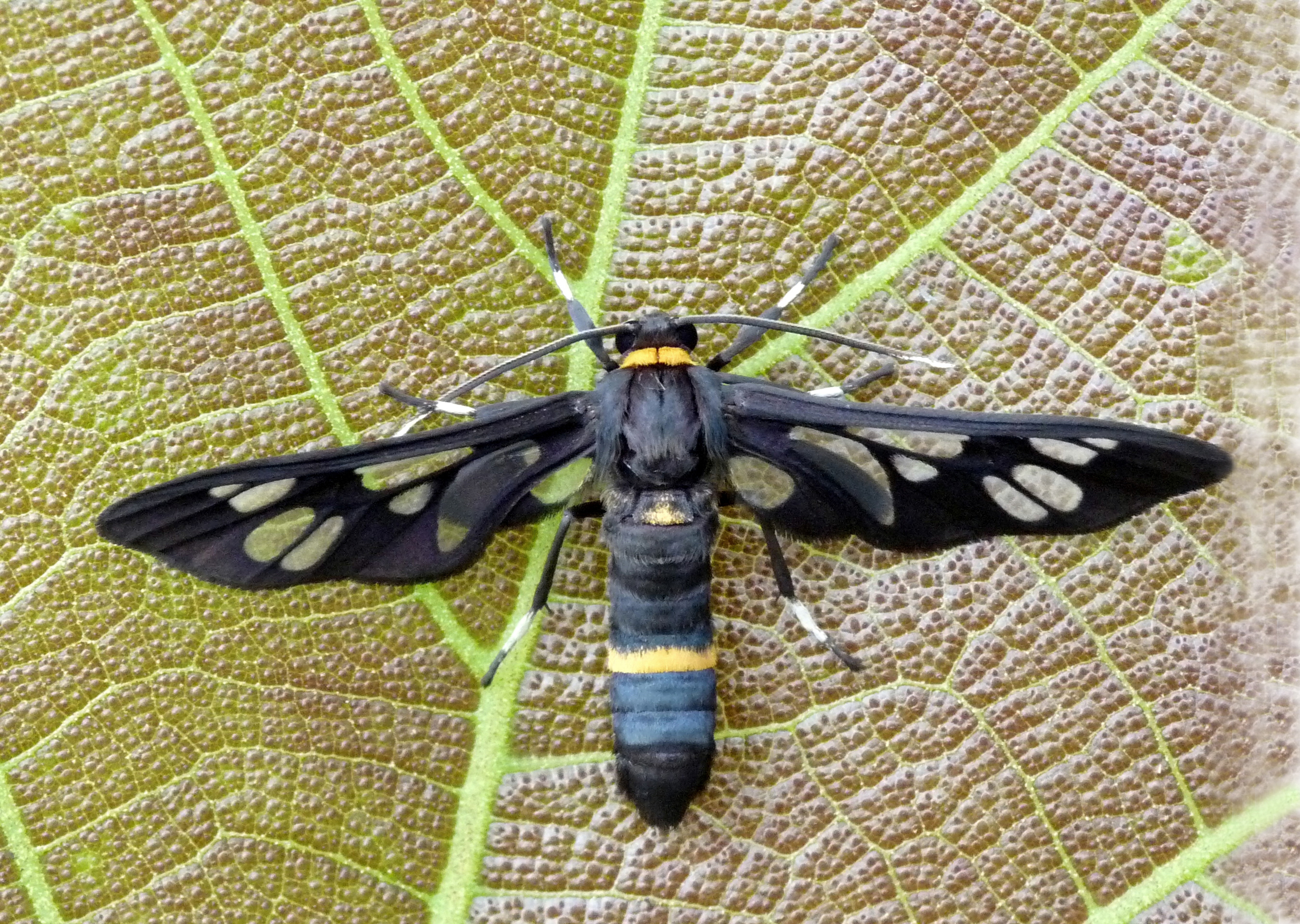
Syntomoides imaon

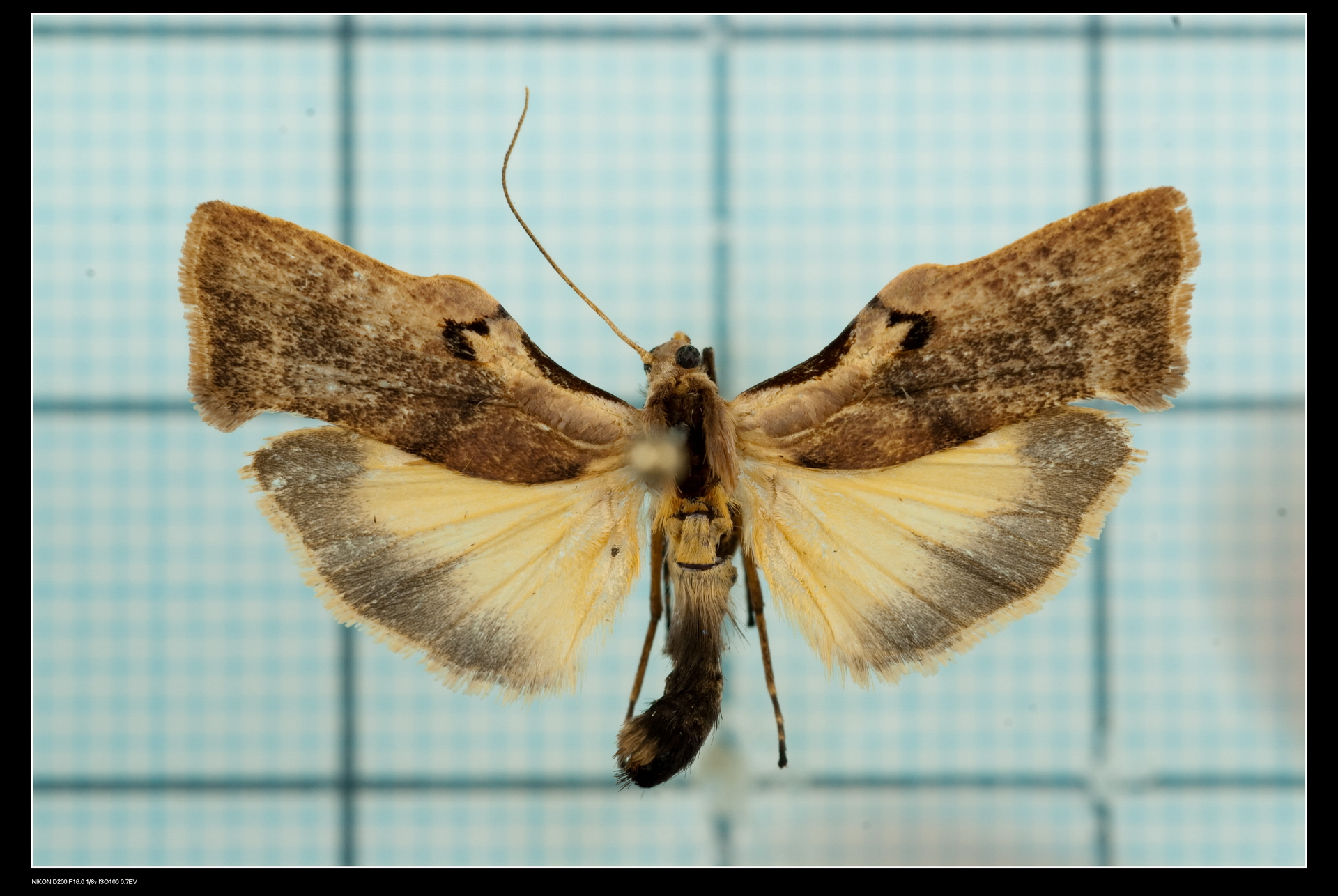
Teulisna tumida

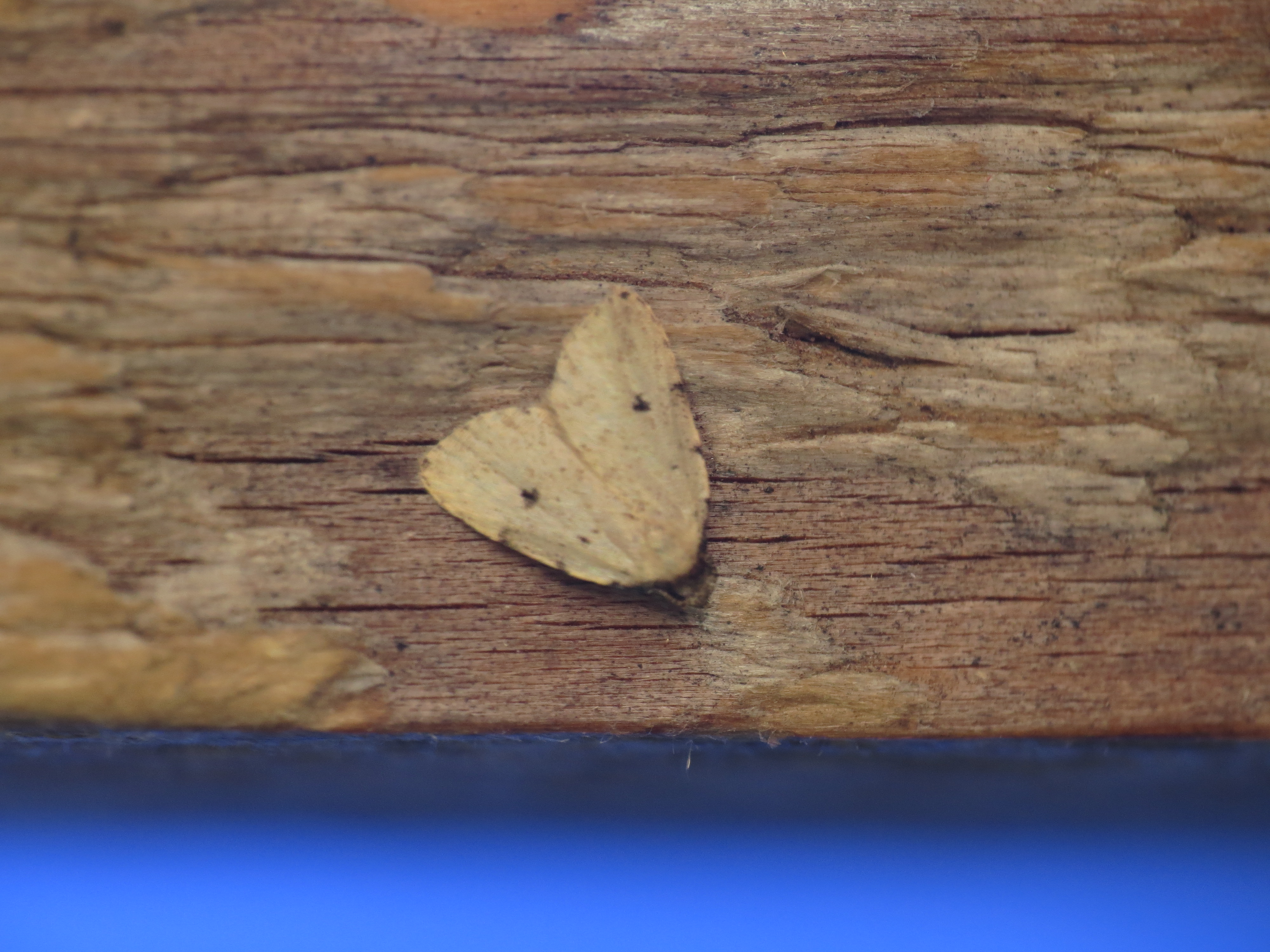
Thumatha fuscescens

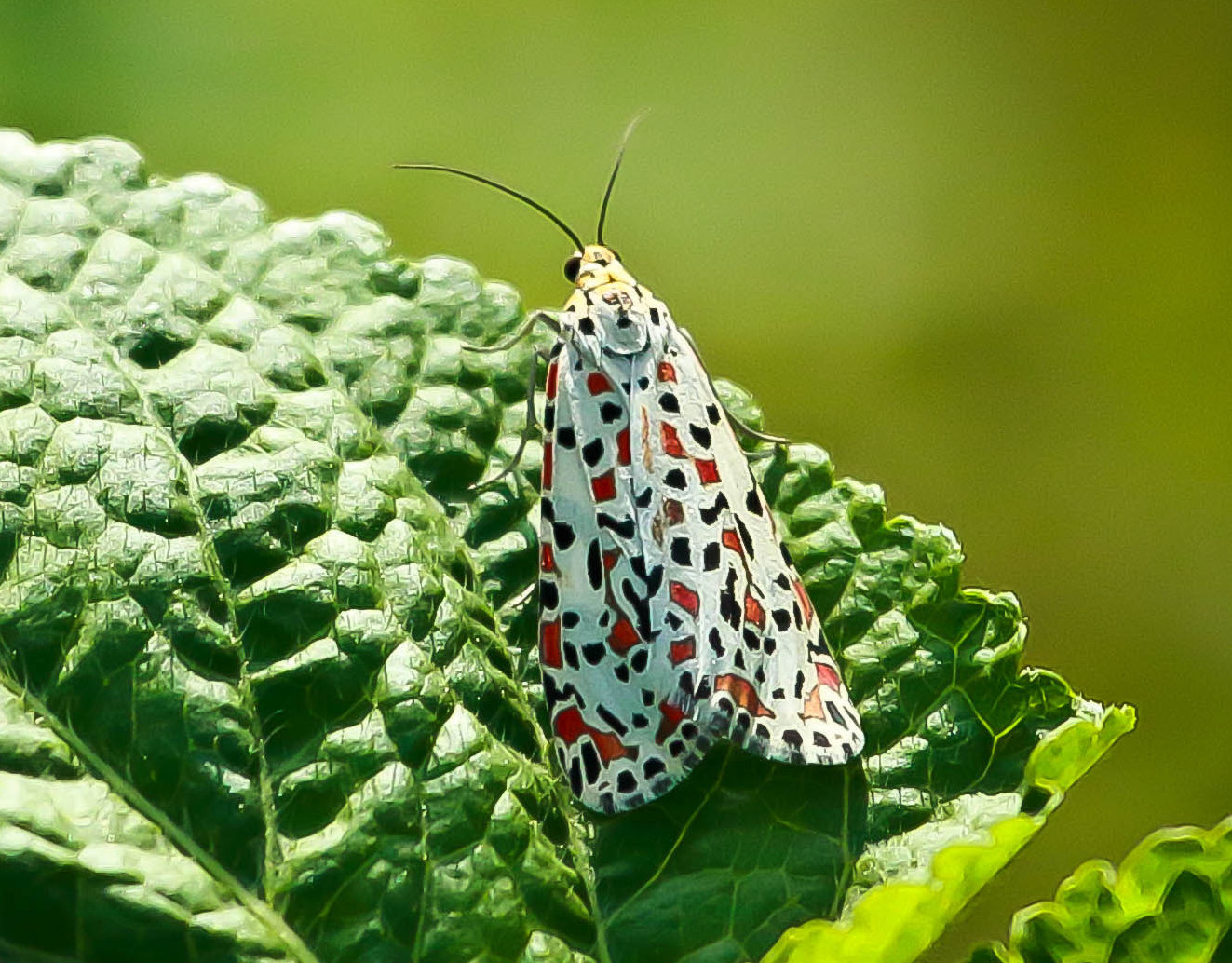
Utetheisa lotrix

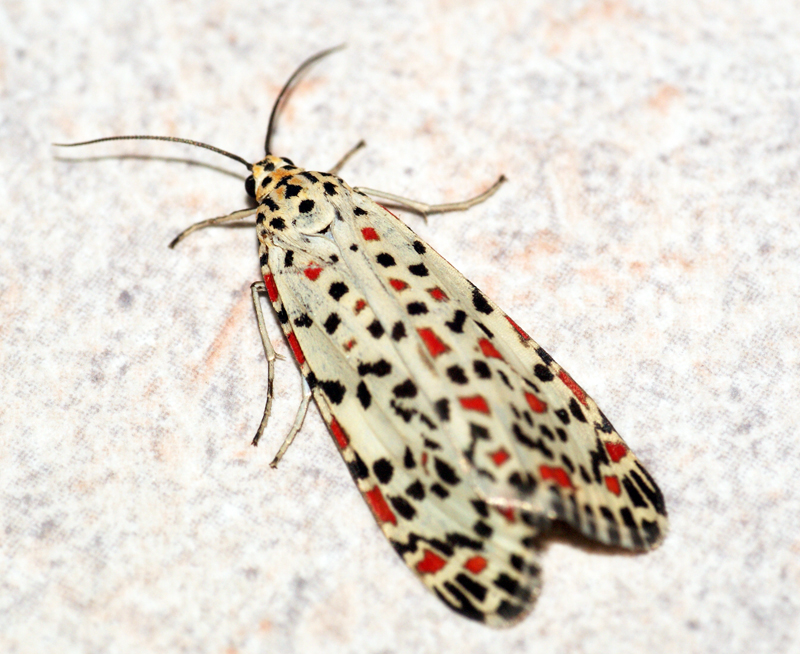
Utetheisa pulchelloides

==== Boletobiinae ====
- Araeopteron griseata Hampson, 1907
- Araeopteron nivalis Hampson, 1907
- Araeopteron pictale Hampson, 1893
- Araeopteron poliophaea (Hampson, 1910)
- Araeopteron proleuca Hampson, 1907
- Araeopteron rufescens (Hampson, 1910)
- Araeopteron xanthopis (Hampson, 1907)
- Autoba abrupta Walker, 1865
- Autoba angulifera (Moore, 1882)
- Autoba brachygonia (Hampson, 1910)
- Autoba olivacea Walker, [1858]
- Condate arenacea (Walker 1865)
- Corgatha zonalis Walker, [1859]
- Enispa oblataria Walker, 1861
- Enispa albinellus Hampson, 1896
- Enispa atricincta (Hampson, 1907)
- Enispa croceicincta (Hampson, 1903)
- Enispa minuta (Hampson, 1893)
- Enispa oinistis (Hampson, 1907)
- Enispa poliorhoda (Hampson, 1907)
- Enispa purpurascens (Hampson, 1907)
- Enispa rosea (Hampson, 1893)
- Enispa rubrifuscaria (Hampson, 1903)
- Enispa rufapicia Hampson, 1918
- Eublemma amabilis Moore, [1884]
- Eublemma anachoresis (Wallengren, 1863)
- Eublemma baccalix (Swinhoe, 1886)
- Eublemma cochylioides (Guenée, 1852)
- Eublemma dimidialis (Fabricius, 1794)
- Eublemma pudica Snellen, 1880
- Eublemma rivula Moore, 1882 - syn. Rivula pallida
- Eublemma scitulum (Rambur, 1833)
- Eublemma trifasciata Moore, 1881
- Hiccoda dosaroides Moore, 1882
- Hiccoda nigripalpis (Walker, 1866)
- Homodes vivida Guenée, 1852
- Hypenagonia brachypalpia Hampson, 1912
- Hypenagonia flavisigna Hampson, 1912
- Hypenagonia longipalpis Hampson, 1912
- Hypenagonia nigrifascia Hampson, 1893
- Hypenagonia vexataria Walker, 1861
- Metachrostis egens Moore, [1884]
- Metachrostis pectinata Hampson, 1907
- Micraeschus elataria Walker, 1861
- Micraeschus rosellus Hampson, 1893
- Neachrostia undulata (Hampson 1893)
- Oruza divisa (Walker, 1862)
- Sophta ruficeps (Walker, 1864)
- Tamba decolor Walker, 1865
- Tamba lineifera Walker, 1865
- Tamba usurpatalis Walker, 1858
- Zurobata vacillans (Walker, 1864)
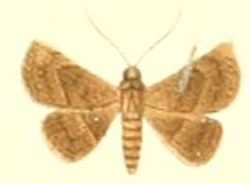
Autoba abrupta

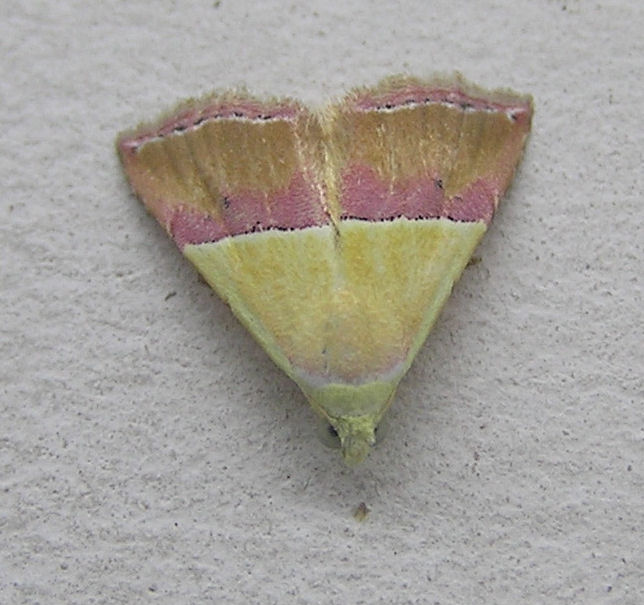
Eublemma anachoresis

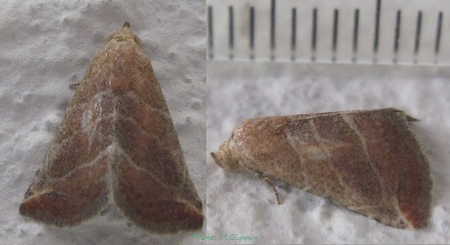
Eublemma baccalix

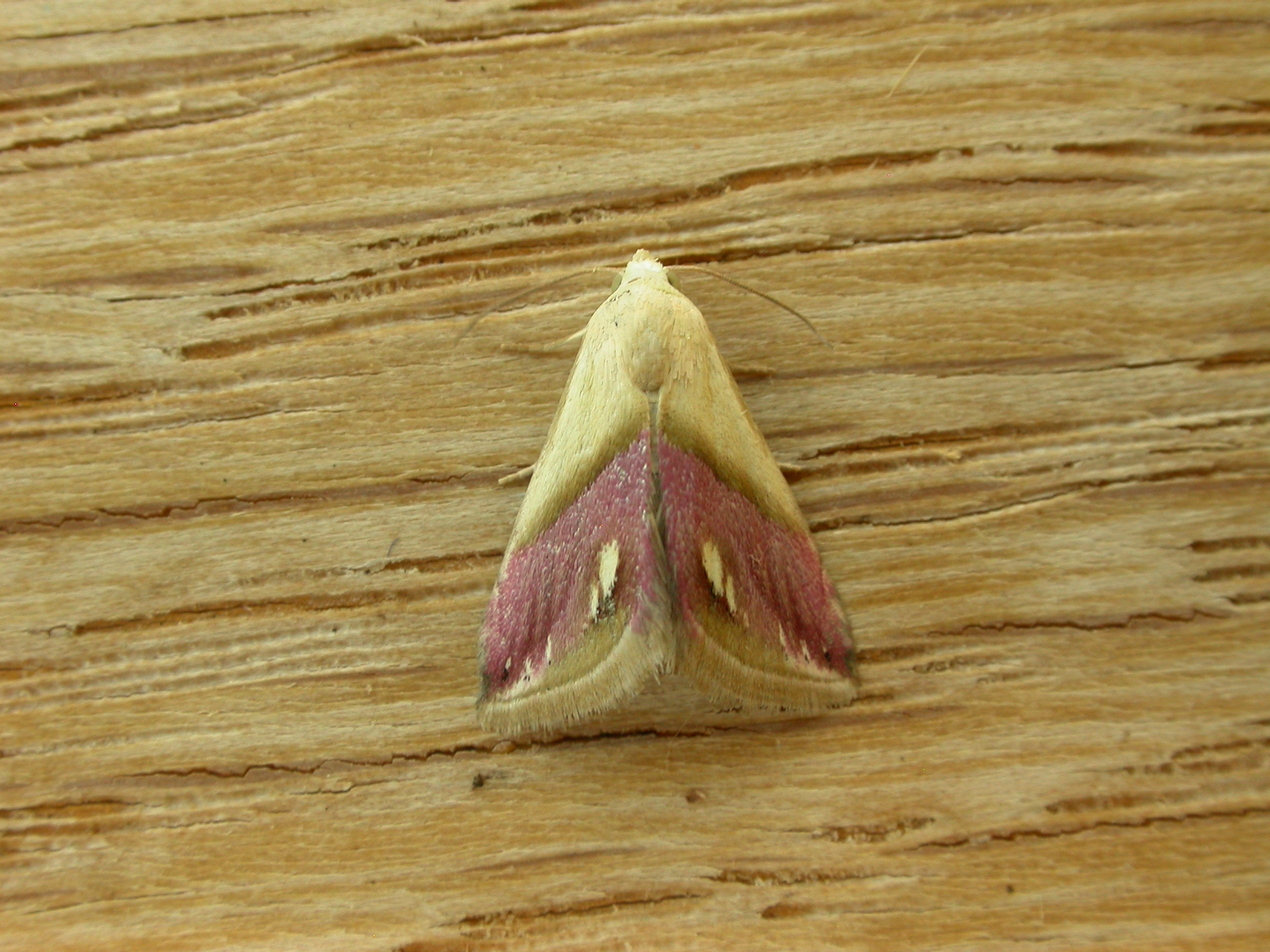
Eublemma cochylioides

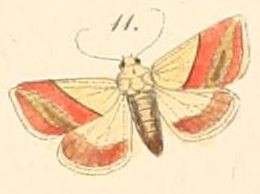
Eublemma dimidialis

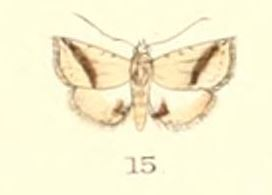
Eublemma pudica

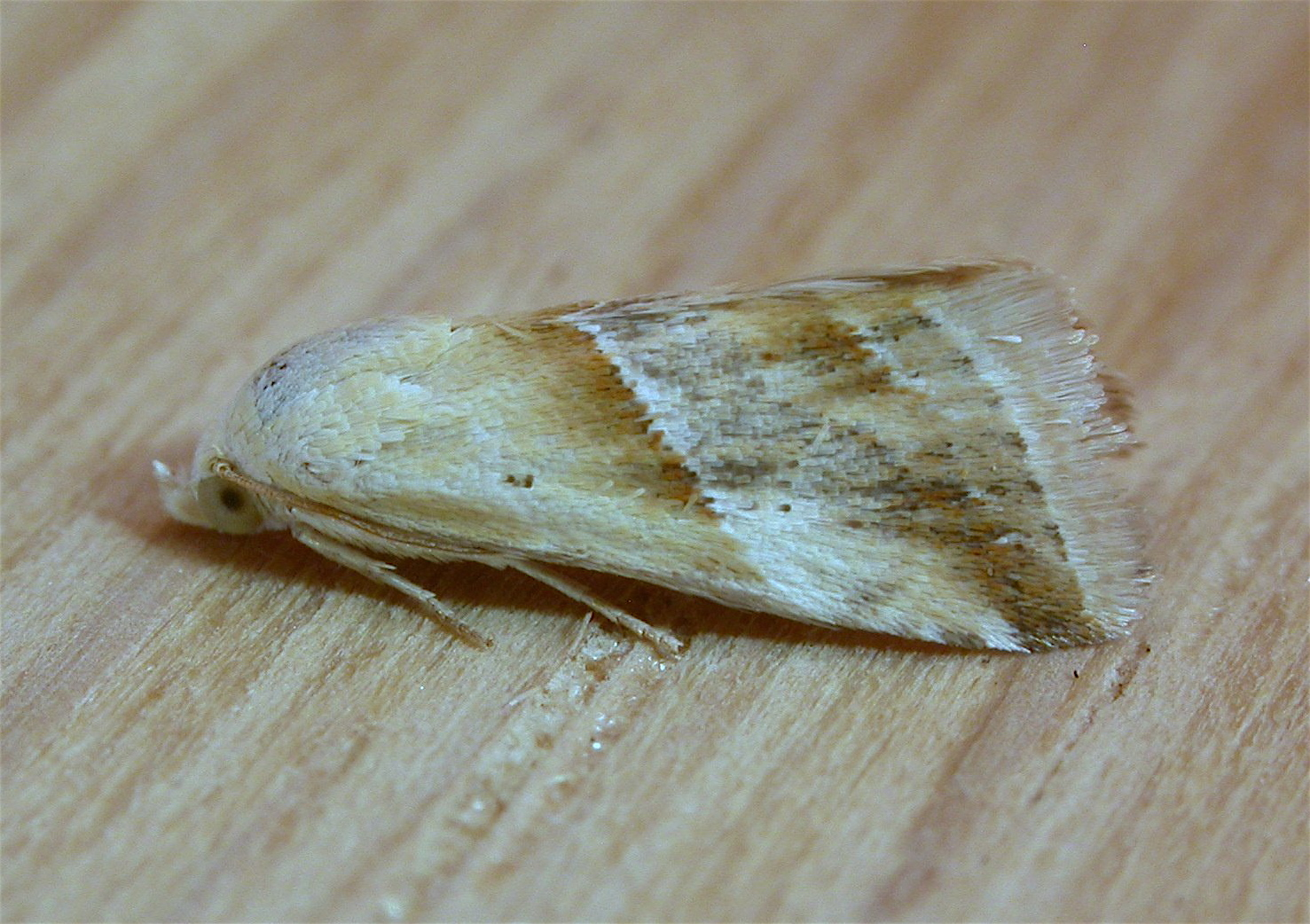
Eublemma rivula

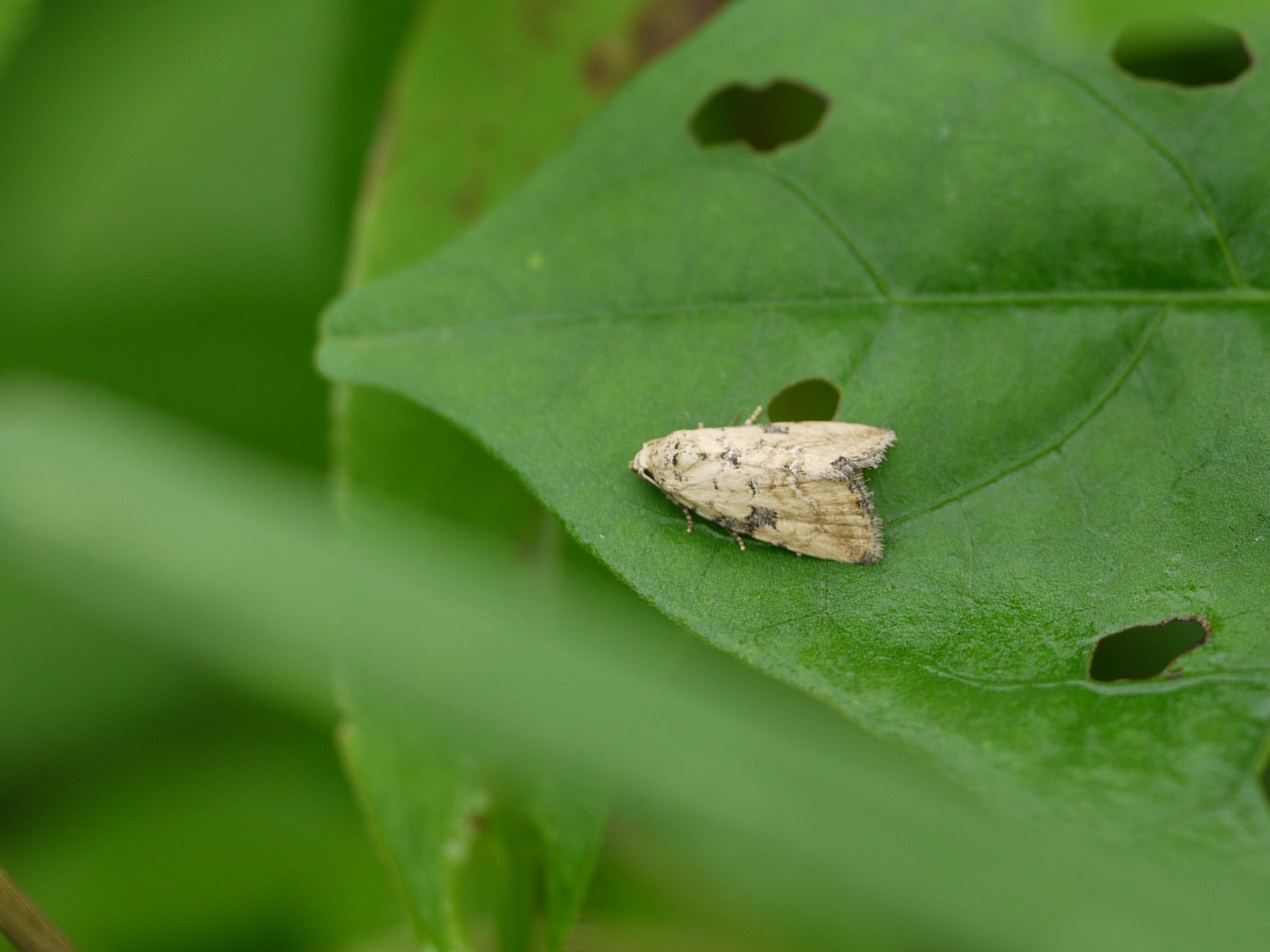
Hiccoda dosaroides

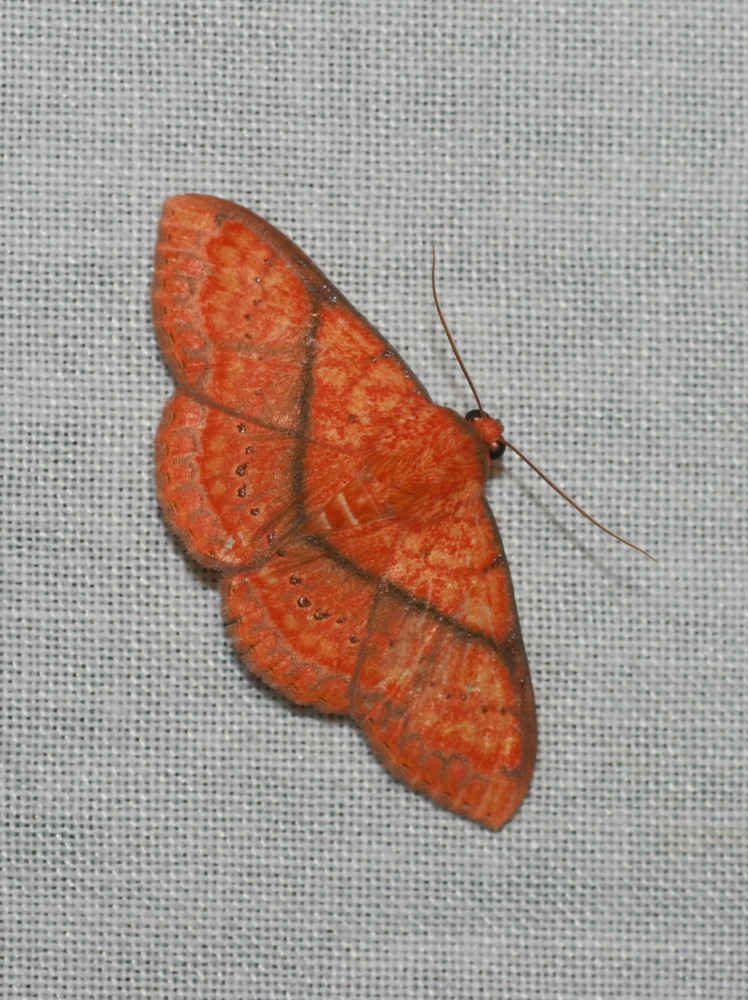
Homodes vivida

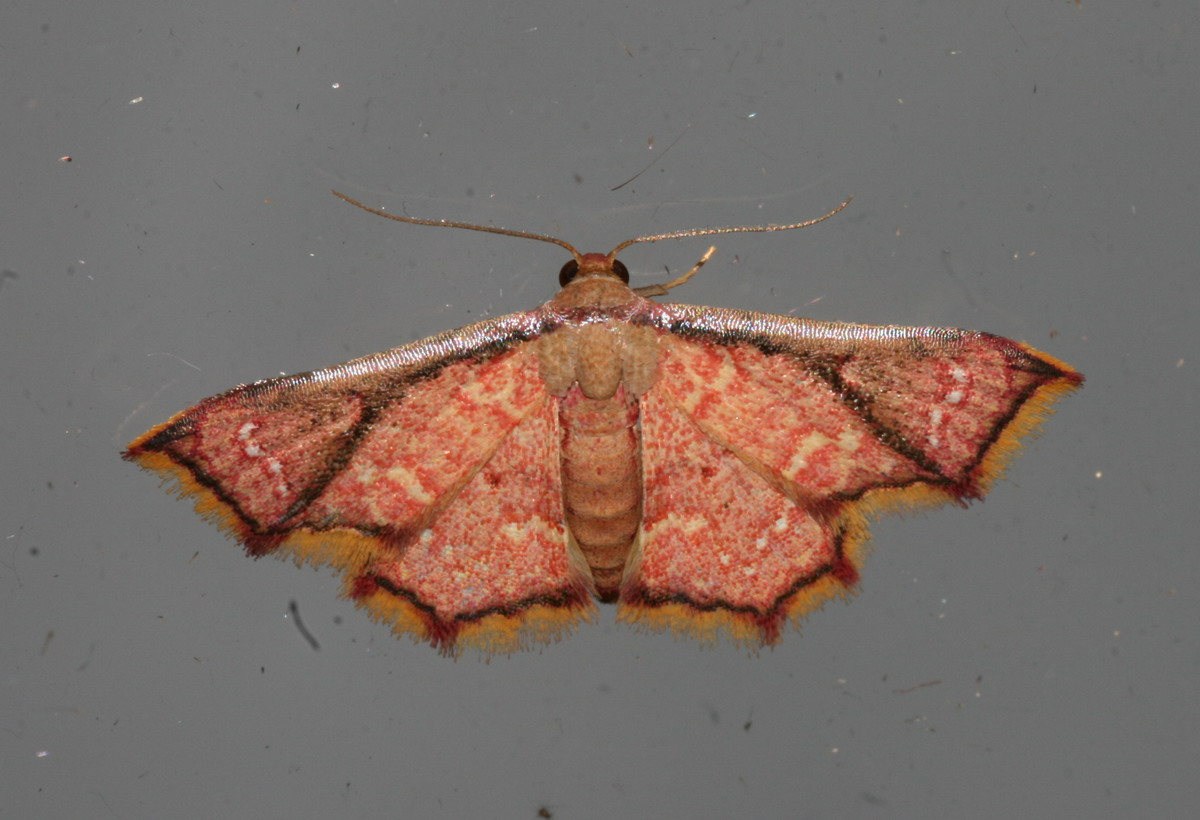
Micraeschus elataria

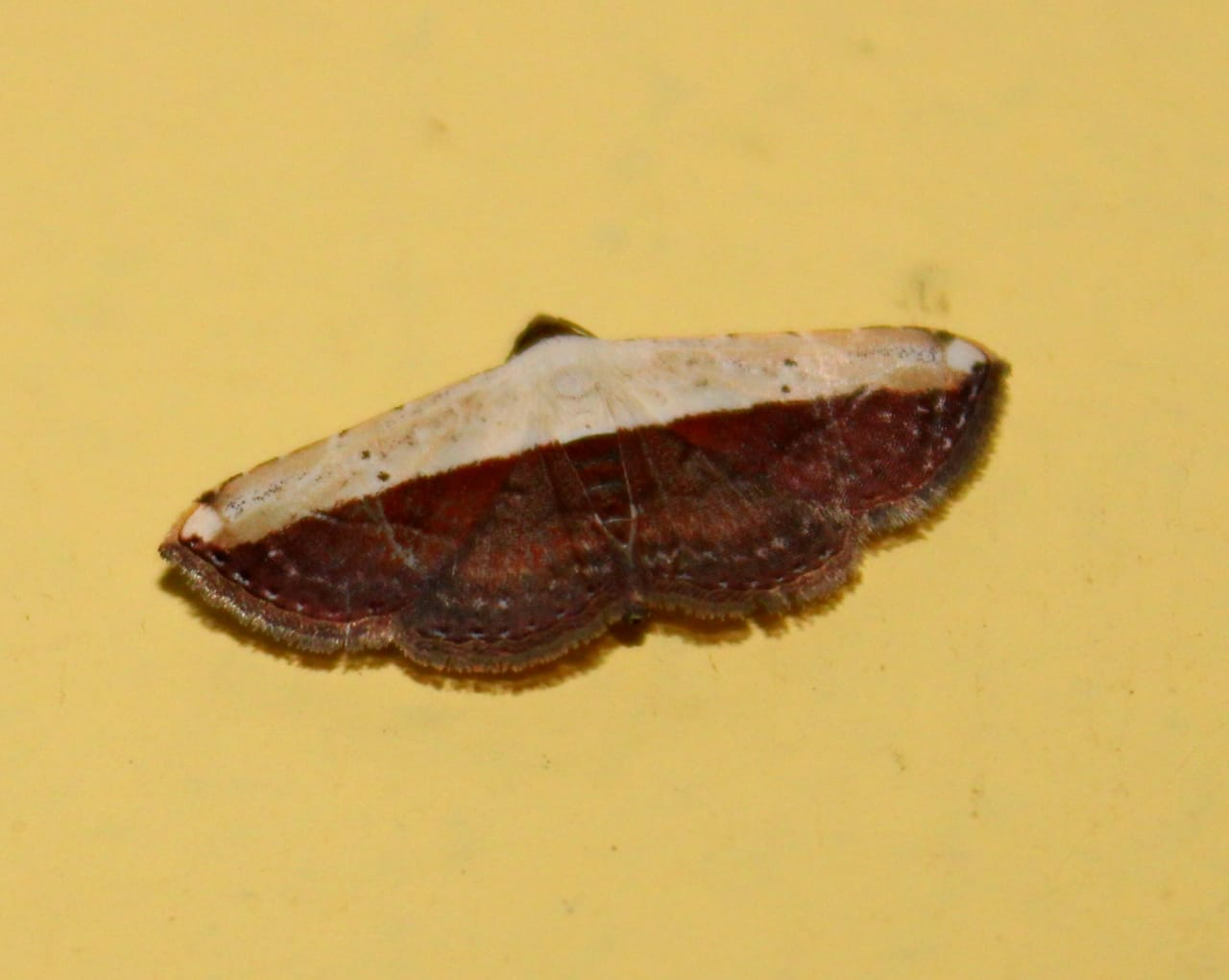
Oruza divisa

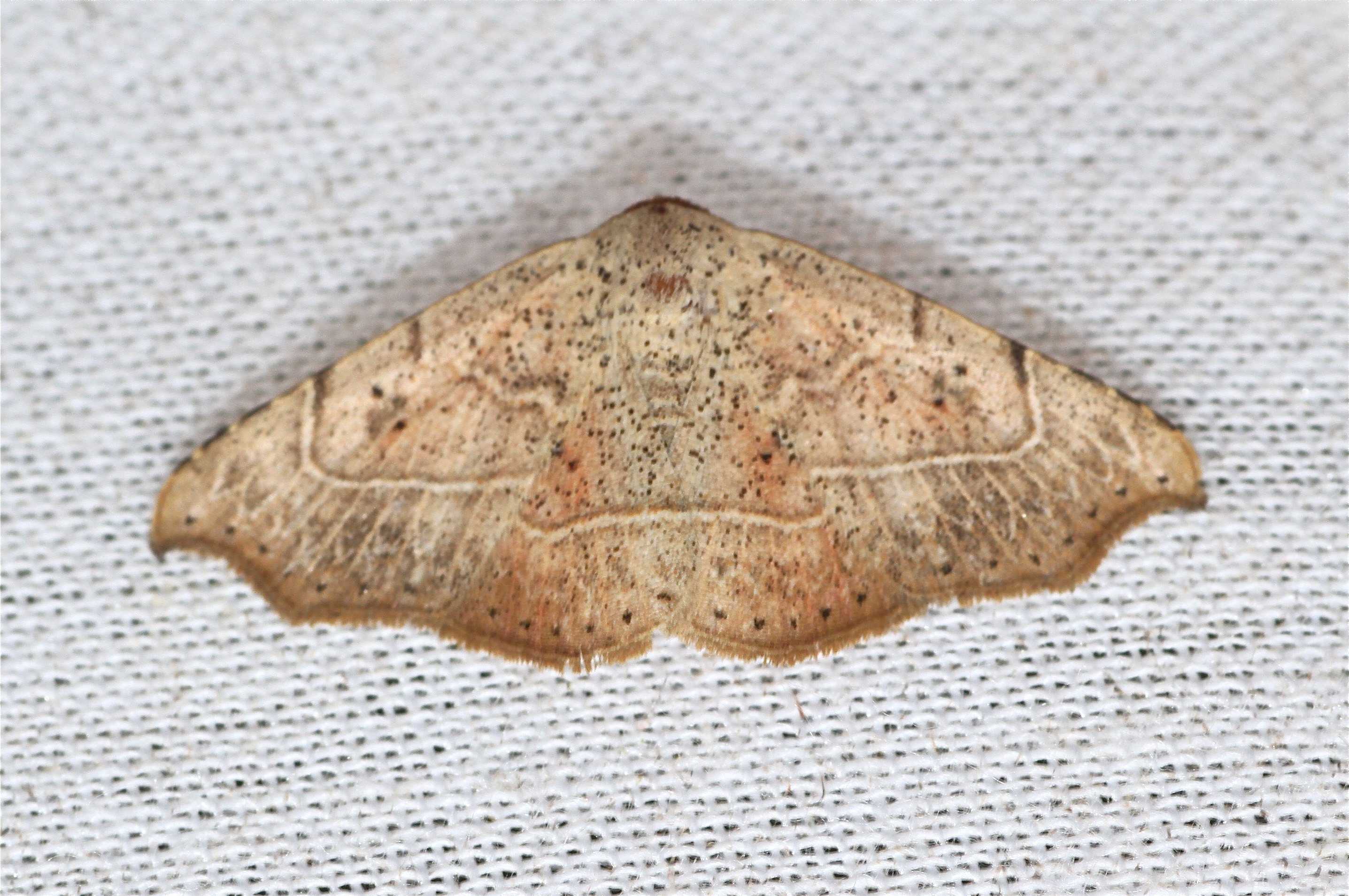
Sophta ruficeps

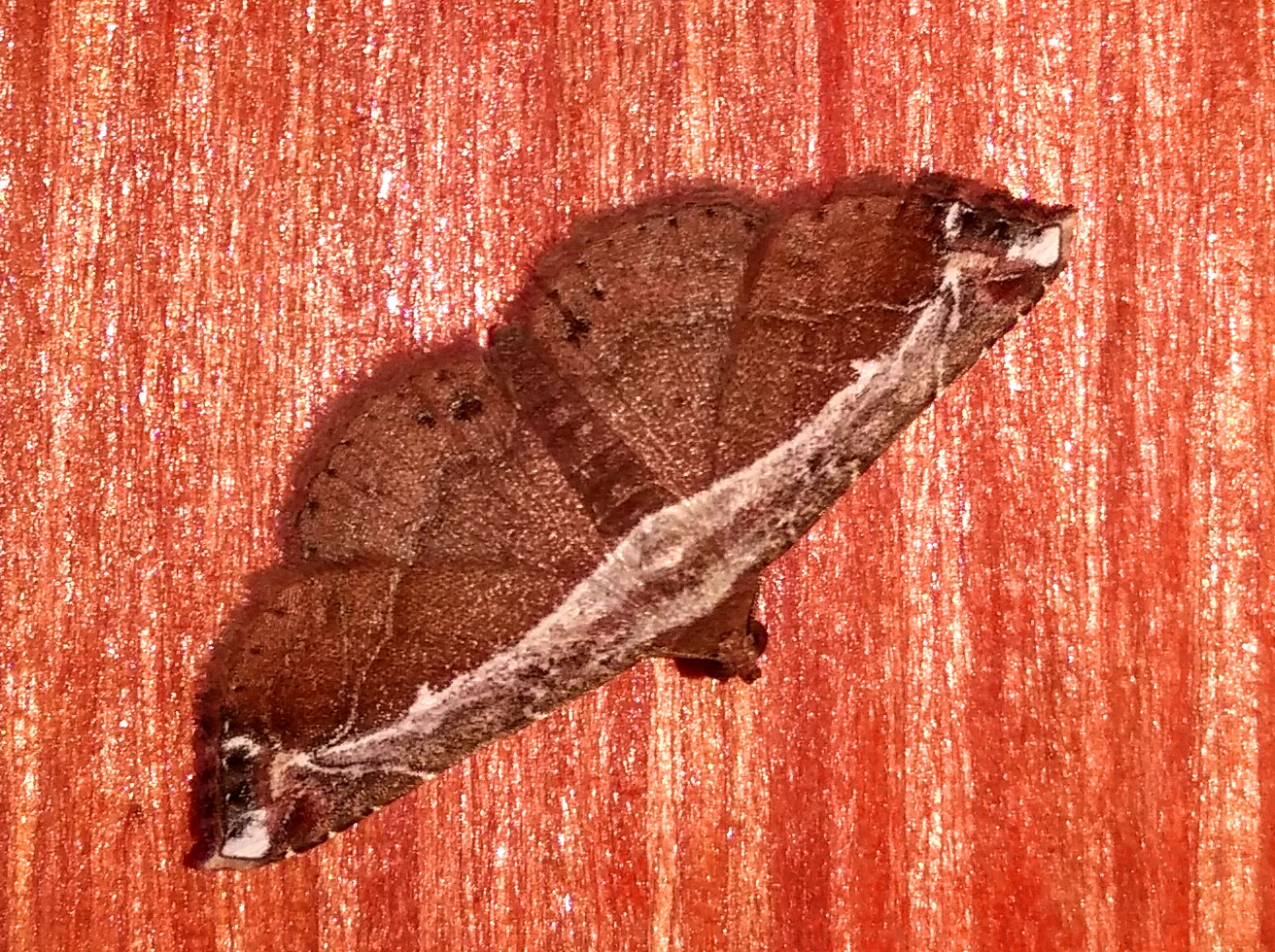
Zurobata vacillans

==== Calpinae - fruit-piercing moths ====
- Acantholipes trajecta (Walker, 1865)
- Araeognatha umbrosa Hampson, 1893
- Bamra albicola (Walker, 1858)
- Bamra mundata (Walker, 1858)
- Belciana biformis (Walker, 1858)
- Bocula pallens (Moore, 1882)
- Bocula xanthostola Hampson, 1926
- Brana calopasa Walker, [1858]
- Brevipecten captata (Butler, 1889)
- Buzara onelia (Guenée, 1852)
- Buzara umbrosa (Walker, 1865)
- Caduca albopunctata (Walker, 1858)
- Calesia dasyptera (Kollar, 1844)
- Calesia flabellifera Moore, 1878
- Calesia fuscicorpus Hampson, 1891
- Calesia haemorrhoa Guenée, 1852
- Calesia rufipalpis (Walker, 1858)
- Calesia stillifera Felder & Rogenhofer, 1874
- Calyptra eustrigata (Hampson, 1926)
- Calyptra minuticornis (Guenée, 1852)
- Calymniops trapezata Moore, 1887
- Chusaris figurata (Moore, [1885])
- Chusaris idaeoides (Hampson, 1891)
- Chusaris paucimaculata (Hampson, 1893)
- Chusaris retatalis Walker, [1859]
- Claterna cydonia (Cramer, [1775])
- Corcobara angulipennis Moore, 1882
- Cyclodes omma (van der Hoeven, 1840)
- Daona mansueta Walker, 1864
- Delgamma pangonia (Guenée, 1852)
- Diascia transvitta (Moore 1887)
- Dierna patibulum (Fabricius, 1794)
- Diomea rotundata Walker, [1858] 1857
- Dordura aliena Walker, 1865
- Dunira scitula Walker, 1865
- Dunira maculapex Hampson, 1893
- Dunira punctimargo Wileman, 1911
- Egnasia accingalis (Walker, 1859)
- Egnasia ephyrodalis Walker, [1859]
- Egnasia ocellata (Walker, 1885)
- Egnasia participalis (Moore, 1885)
- Egnasia polia Hampson, 1891
- Episparis liturata (Fabricius, 1787)
- Episparis tortuosalis Moore, 1867
- Eudocima aurantia (Moore, 1877)
- Eudocima cajeta (Cramer, 1775)
- Eudocima homaena (Bübner, 1823)
- Eudocima hypermnestra (Cramer, 1780)
- Eudocima materna Linnaeus, (1767)
- Eudocima phalonia (Linnaeus, 1763)
- Eudocima salaminia (Cramer, 1777)
- Falana sordida Moore, 1882
- Fodina pallula Guenée, 1852
- Fodina stola Hampson, 1893 F. postmaculata is considered as a synonym
- Gesonia obeditalis (Walker, 1866)
- Goniocraspedon mistura (Swinhoe, 1891)
- Hyperlopha cristifera (Walker, 1865)
- Hypocala deflorata (Fabricius, 1792)
- Hypocala violacea Butler, 1879
- Ilyrgis echephurealis Walker, 1859
- Maguda palpalis Walker, 1865
- Marapana pulverata Guenée, 1852
- Mecodina praecipua Walker, 1865
- Mecistoptera griseifusa Hampson, 1893
- Micreremites rasalis Warren, 1891
- Nagadeba indecoralis Walker, 1865
- Nagadeba polia (Hampson, 1891)
- Nolasena ferrifervens Walker [1858]
- Olulis lactigutta (Hampson, 1907)
- Olulis puncticinctalis Walker, 1863
- Oraesia emarginata (Fabricius, 1794)
- Oraesia provocans Walker, 1857
- Oxygonitis sericeata Hampson, 1893
- Panilla dispila Walker, 1865
- Pantydia metaspila (Walker, 1857)
- Papuacola lignicolor Hampson, 1926
- Phyllodes consobrina Westwood, 1848
- Pilipectus prunifera (Hampson, 1894)
- Plusiodonta coelonota (Kollar & Redtenbacher, 1844)
- Pseudogyrtona perversa Walker, 1862
- Radara subcupralis (Walker, 1866)
- Ramadasa pavo (Walker, 1856)
- Rema tetraspila (Walker, 1865)
- Rhangena roseipennis Moore, 1886
- Rhesala imparata (Walker, 1858)
- Rhesala moestalis (Walker, 1866)
- Saroba ceylonica Walker 1865
- Saroba maculicosta Walker, 1858
- Saroba pustulifera Walker, 1865
- Serrodes campana Guenée, 1852
- Serrodes partita (Fabricius, 1775)
- Tadaxa bijungens (Walker, 1865)
- Tephriopis divulsa Walker, 1865
- Tipasa omariusalis Walker, 1859
- Tipasa renalis Moore, 1885

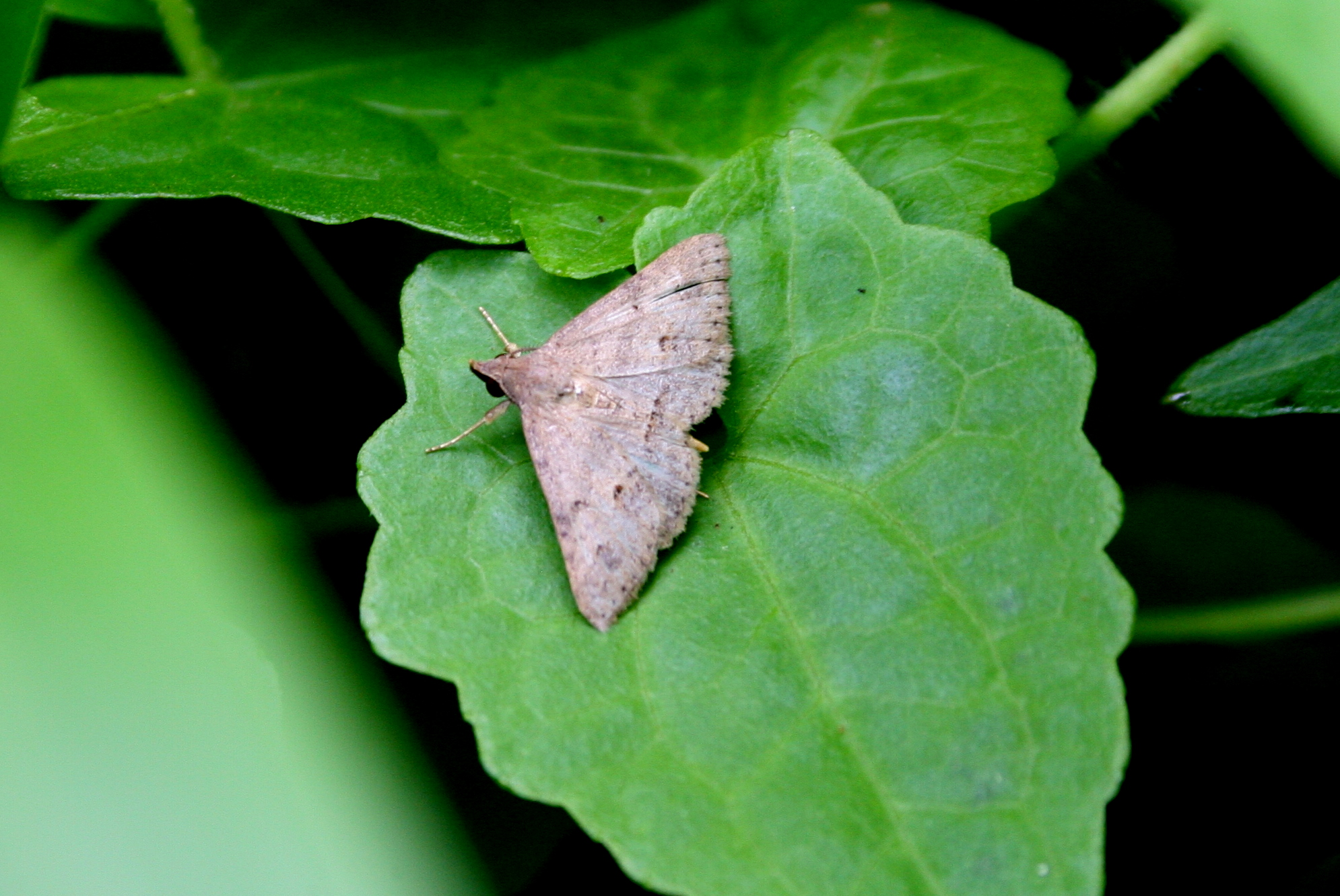
Gesonia obeditalis

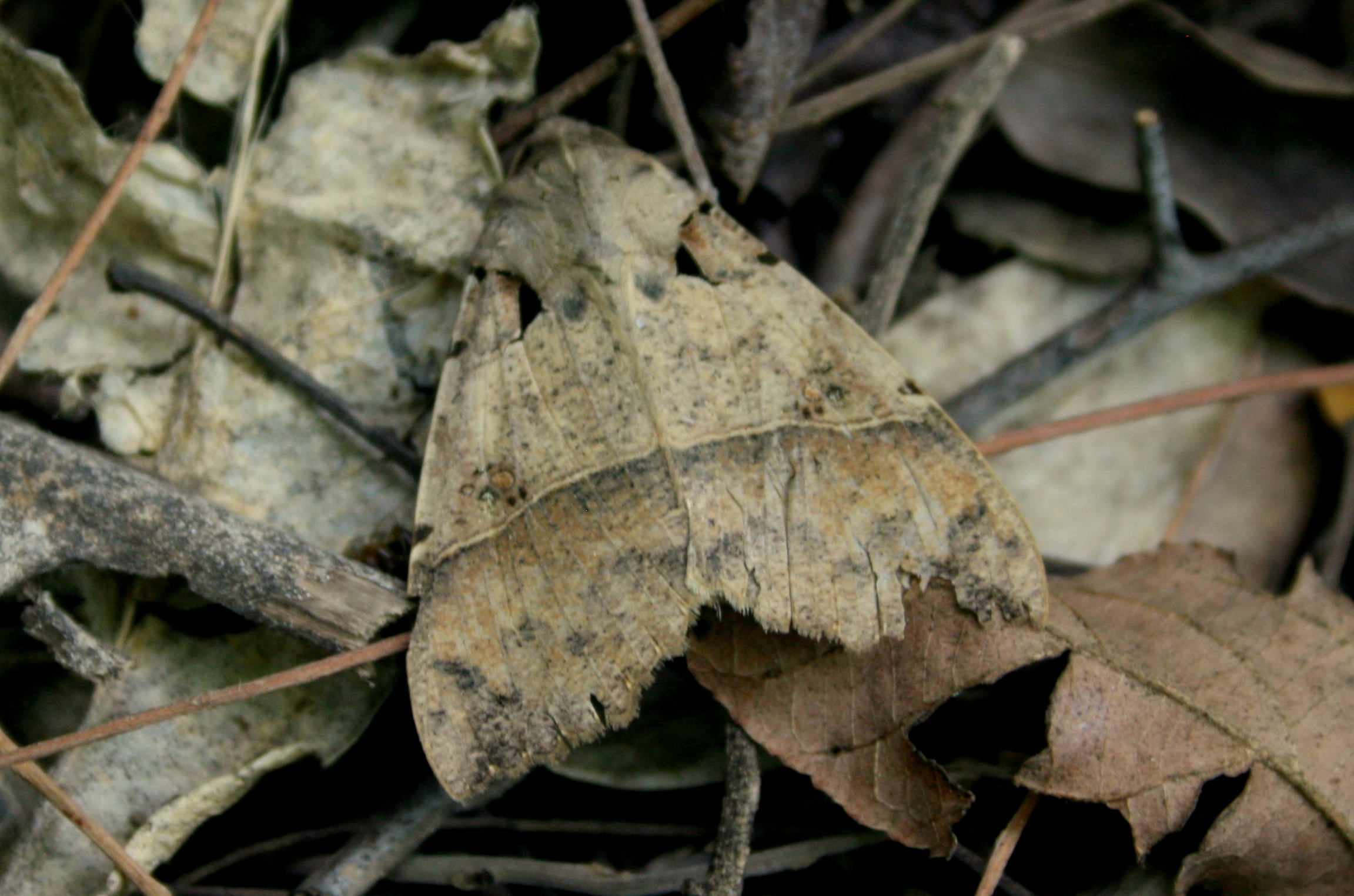
Serrodes campana

==== Erebinae ====
- Achaea janata (Linnaeus, 1758)
- Achaea mercatoria (Fabricius, 1775)
- Achaea mezentia (Stoll, 1780)
- Achaea serva (Fabricius, 1775)
- Avatha bubo (Geyer, 1832)
- Avatha discolor (Fabricius, 1794)
- Bastilla absentimacula (Guenée, 1852)
- Bastilla amygdalis (Moore, 1887)
- Bastilla analis (Guenée, 1852)
- Bastilla arctotaenia (Guenée, 1852)
- Bastilla arcuata (Moore, 1877)
- Bastilla crameri (Moore, 1885)
- Bastilla fulvotaenia (Guenée, 1852)
- Bastilla simillima (Guenée, 1852)
- Dysgonia rigidistria (Guenée, 1852)
- Dysgonia calefasciens (Guenée, 1852)
- Dysgonia stuposa (Fabricius, 1794)
- Dysgonia torrida (Guenée, 1852)
- Ercheia cyllaria (Cramer, 1779)
- Erebus caprimulgus (Fabricius, 1781)
- Erebus ephesperis (Hübner, 1827)
- Erebus hieroglyphica (Drury, 1773)
- Erebus ipsa (Swinhoe, 1918)
- Erebus macrops (Linnaeus, 1768)
- Ericeia congressa (Walker, 1858)
- Ericeia elongata Prout, 1929
- Ericeia eriophora (Guenée, 1852)
- Ericeia fraterna (Moore, 1885)
- Ericeia inangulata (Guenée, 1852)
- Ericeia lituraria (Saalmüller, 1880)
- Ericeia pertendens Walker, 1858
- Erygia apicalis Guenée, 1852
- Erygia spissa (Guenée, 1852)
- Grammodes geometrica (Fabricius, 1775)
- Hulodes caranea (Cramer, 1780))
- Hypopyra meridionalis (Hampson, 1913)
- Hypopyra unistrigata Guenée, 1852
- Hypopyra vespertilio (Fabricius, 1787)
- Hypospila bolinoides Guenée, 1852
- Lacera alope (Cramer, 1780)
- Lygniodes ciliata Moore, 1867
- Lygniodes vampyrus (Fabricius, 1794)
- Mocis frugalis (Fabricius, 1775)
- Mocis undata (Fabricius, 1775)
- Nagia linteola (Guenée, 1852)
- Ophisma gravata Guenée, 1852
- Ophiusa discriminans (Walker, 1858)
- Ophiusa disjungens (Walker, 1858)
- Ophiusa trapezium (Guenée, 1852)
- Pandesma quenavadi Guenée, 1852
- Polydesma boarmoides Guenée, 1852
- Polydesma umbricola Boisduval, 1833
- Pterocyclophora pictimargo GuHampson, 1893
- Speiredonia itynx (Fabricius, 1787)
- Speiredonia mutabilis (Fabricius, 1794)
- Speiredonia obscura (Cramer, 1780)
- Speiredonia substruens (Walker, 1858)
- Sphingomorpha chlorea (Cramer, 1777)
- Spirama helicina (Hübner, 1831)
- Spirama indenta Hampson, 1891
- Spirama retorta (Clerck, 1764)
- Thyas coronata (Fabricius, 1775)
- Thyas honesta (Hübner, 1806)
- Trigonodes hyppasia (Cramer, 1779)
- Ulotrichopus rama (Moore, 1885)
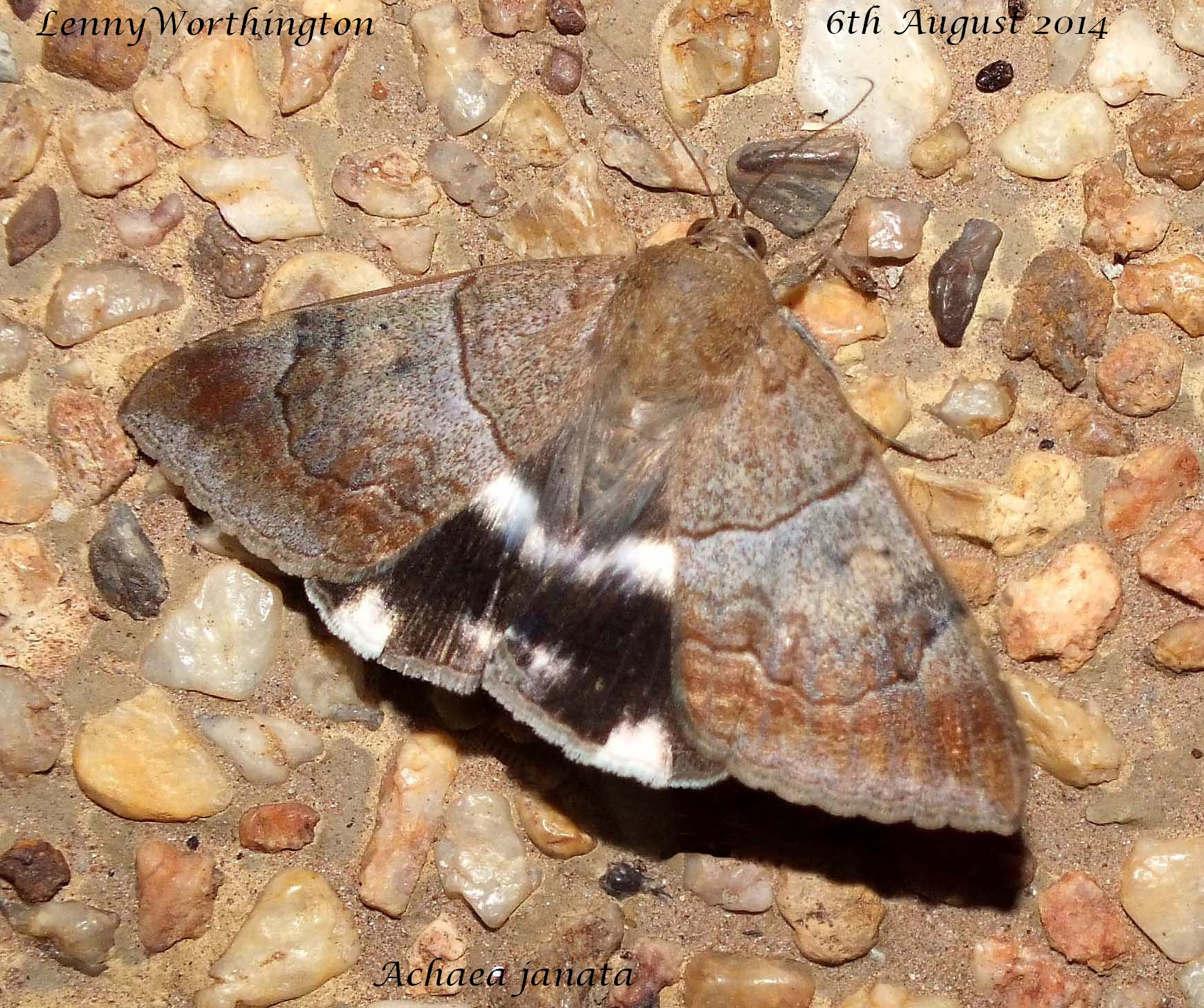
Achaea janata

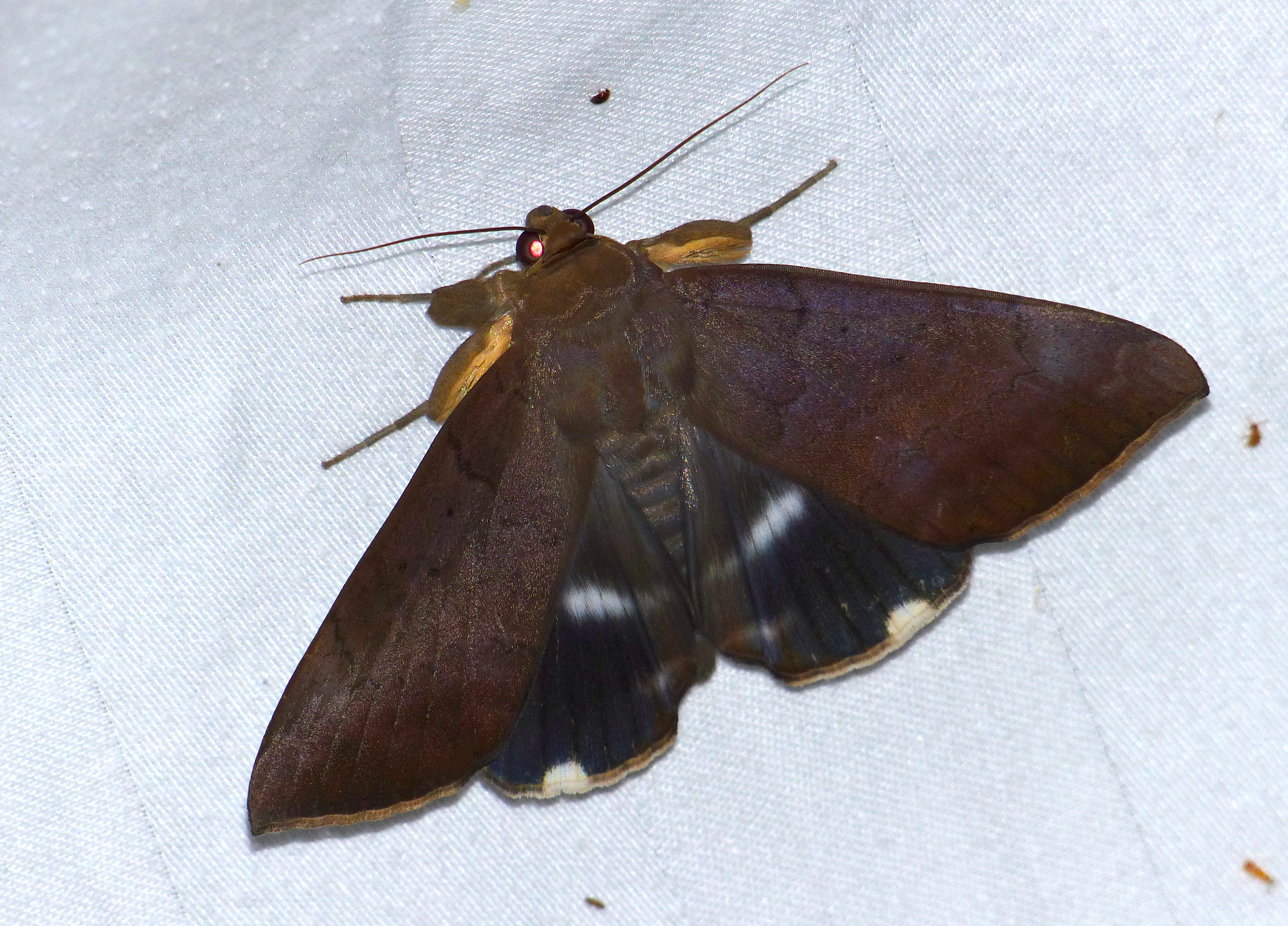
Achaea serva

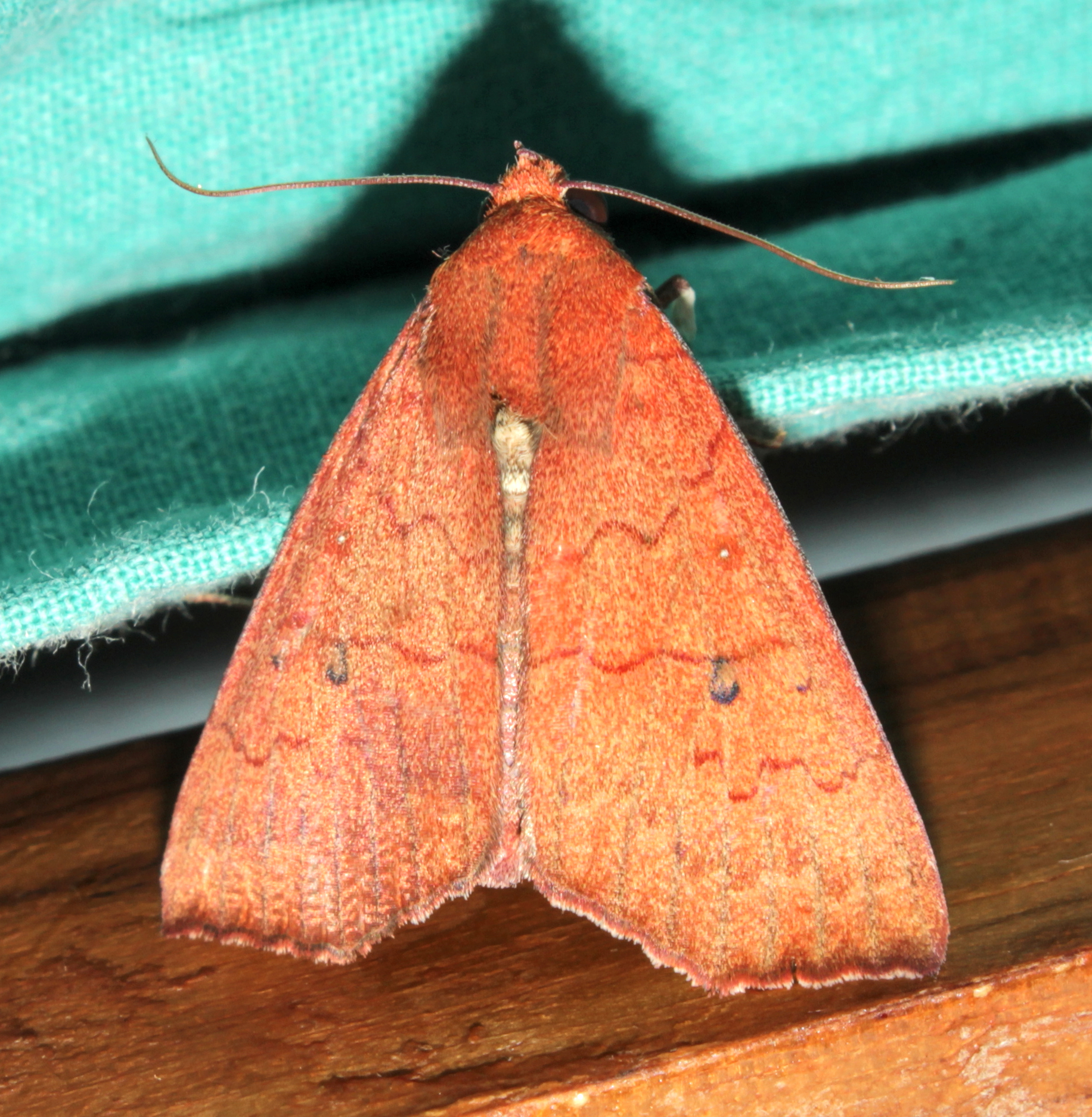
Anomis fulvida

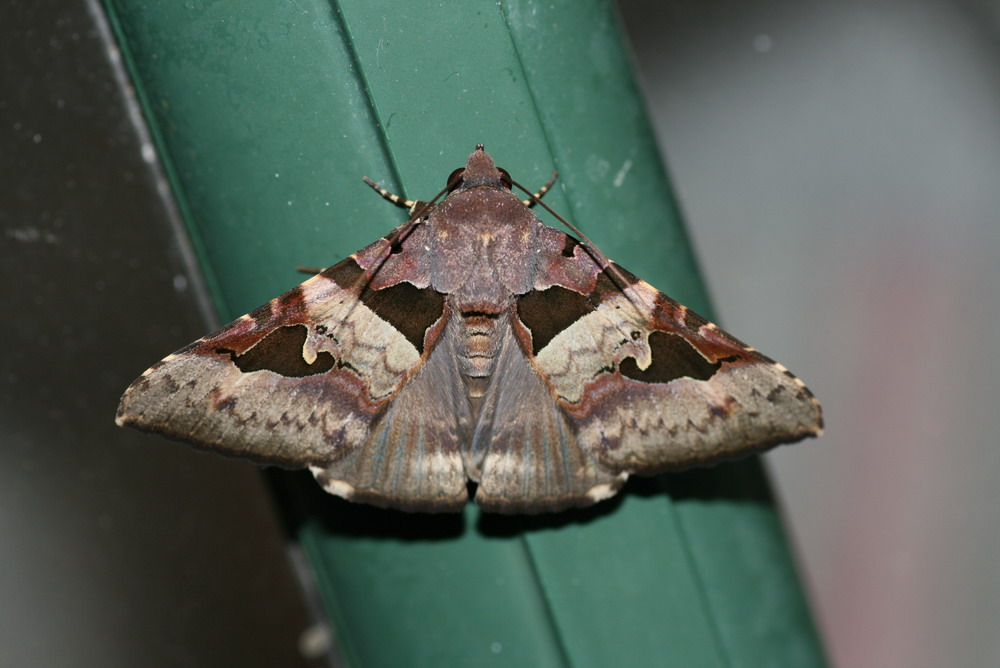
Avatha bubo

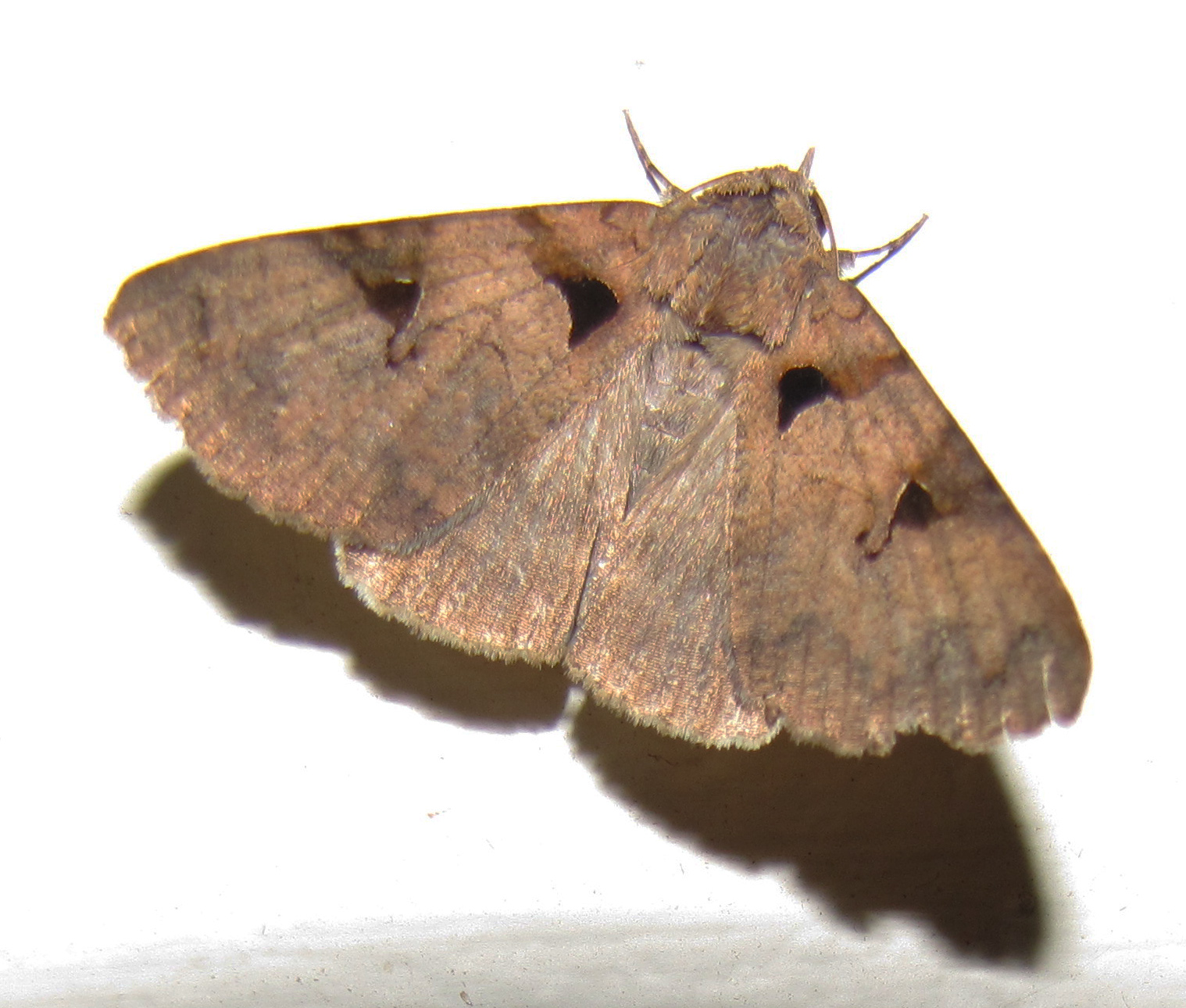
Avatha discolor

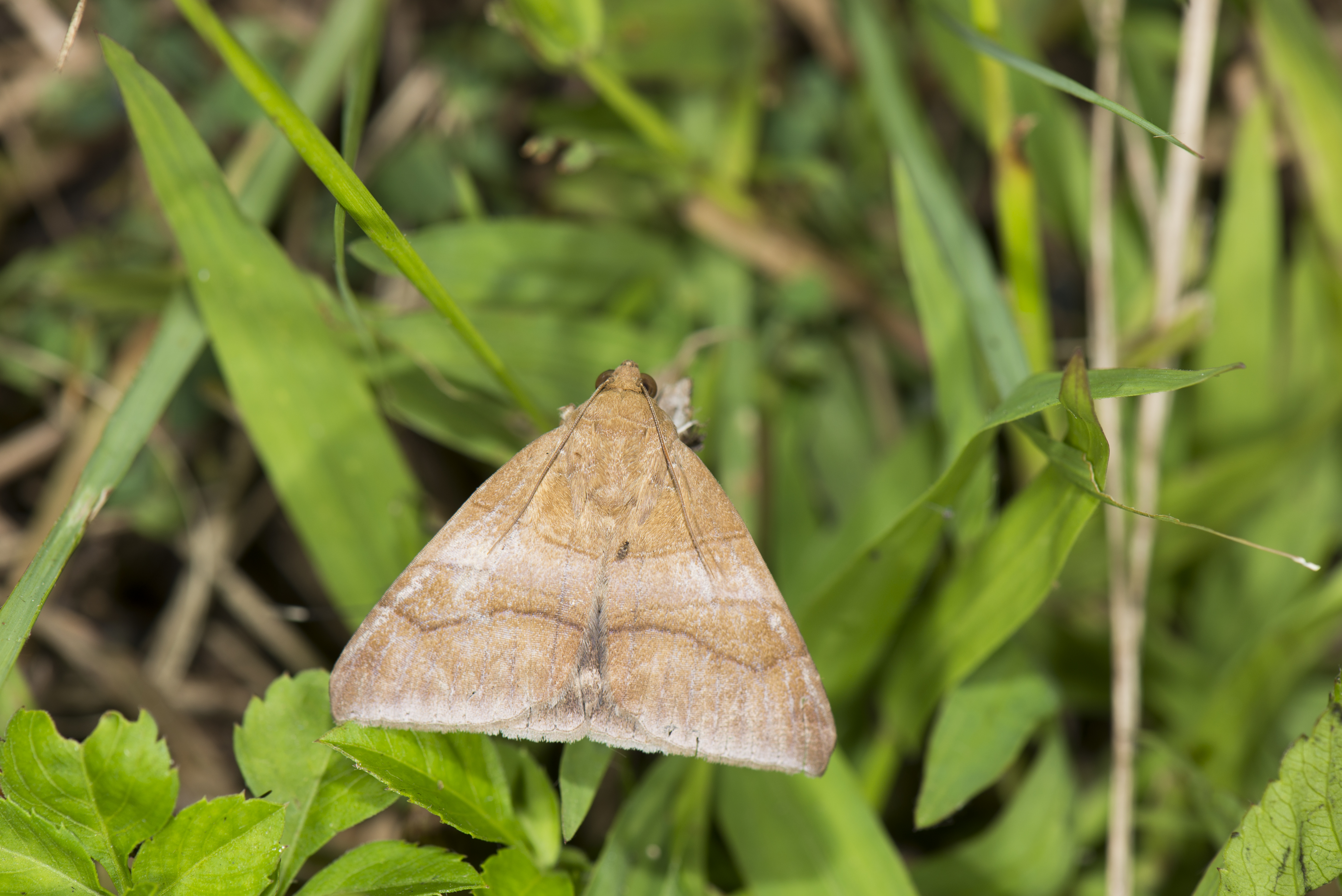
Bastilla absentimacula

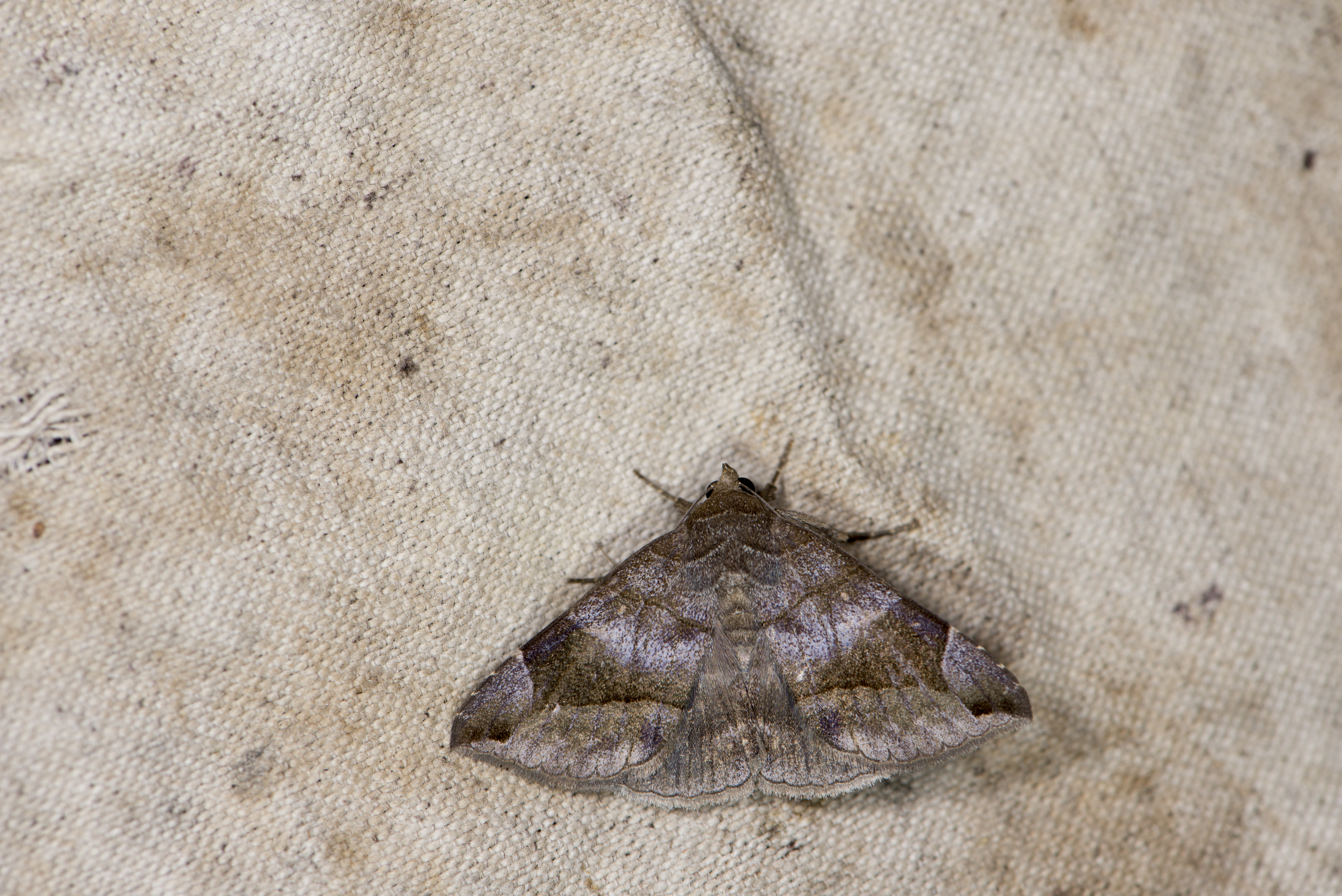
Bastilla amygdalis

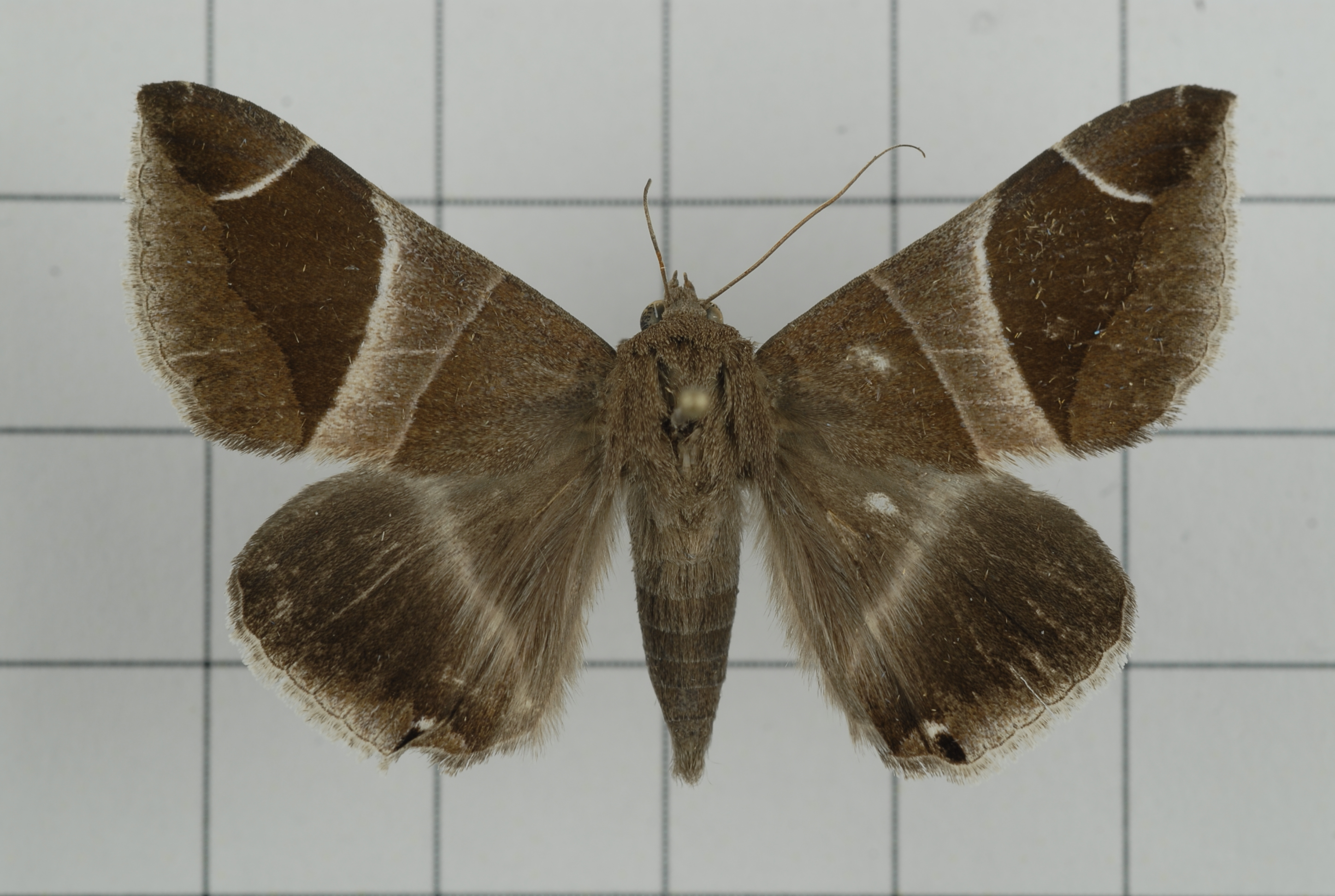
Bastilla analis

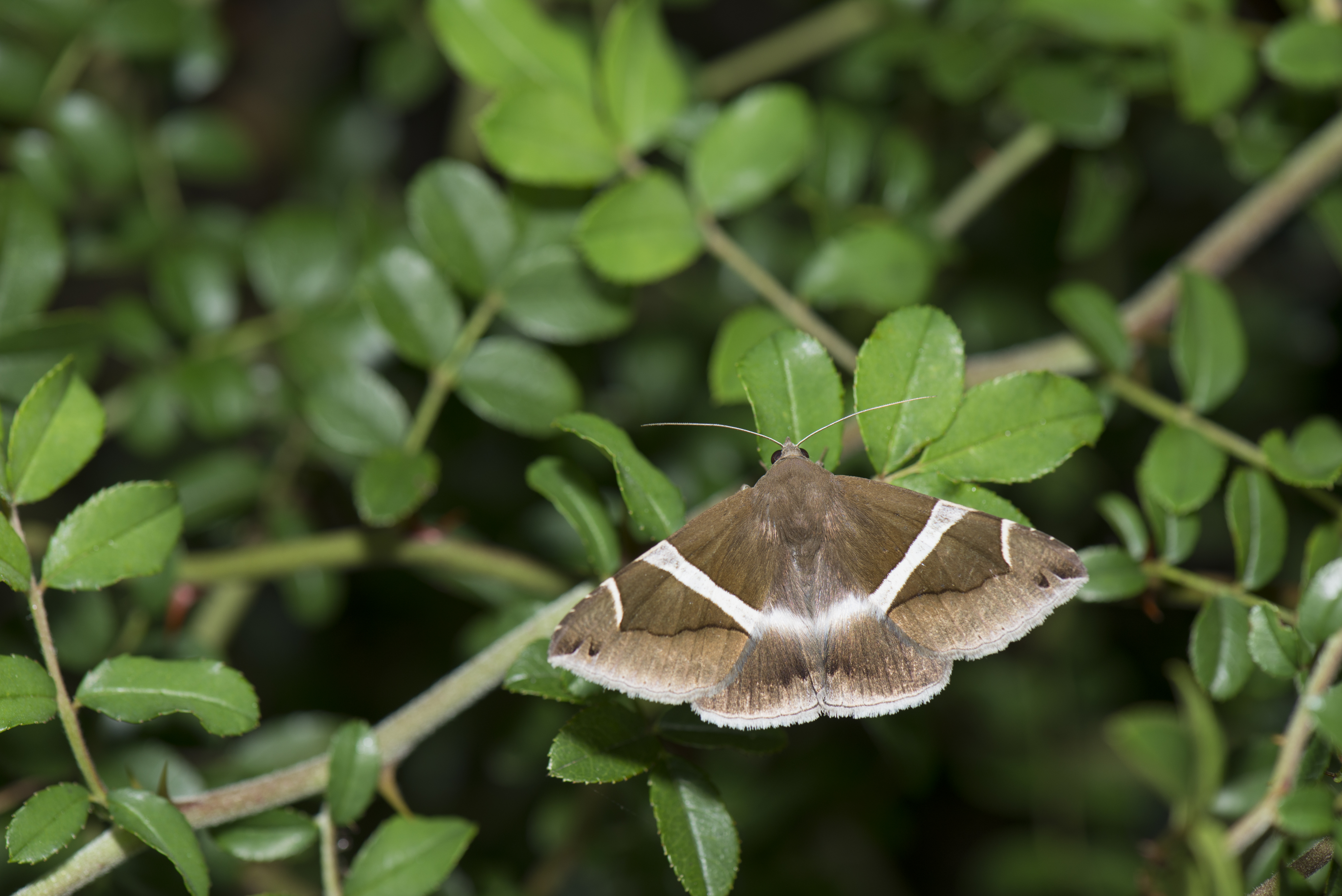
Bastilla arctotaenia

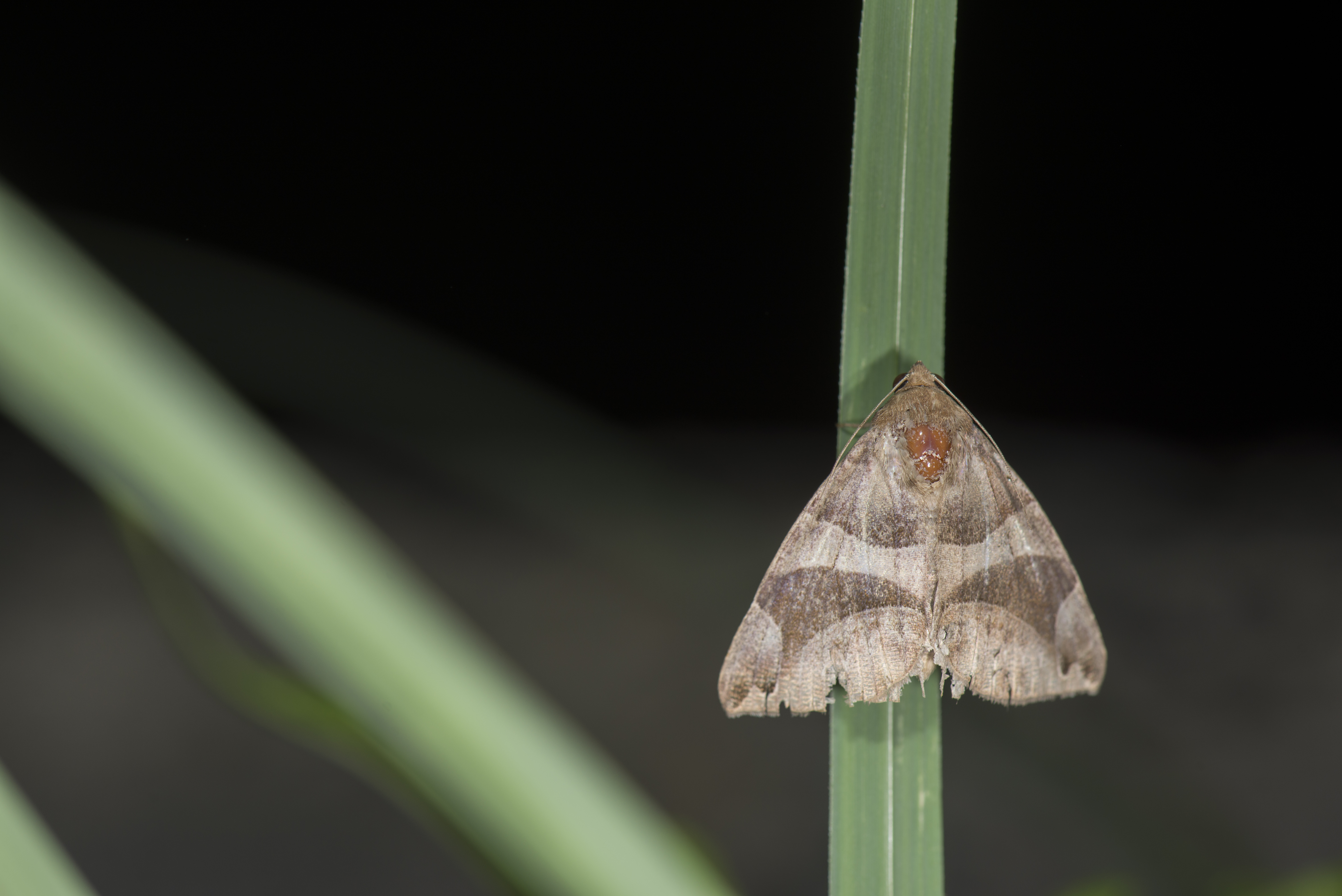
Bastilla arcuata

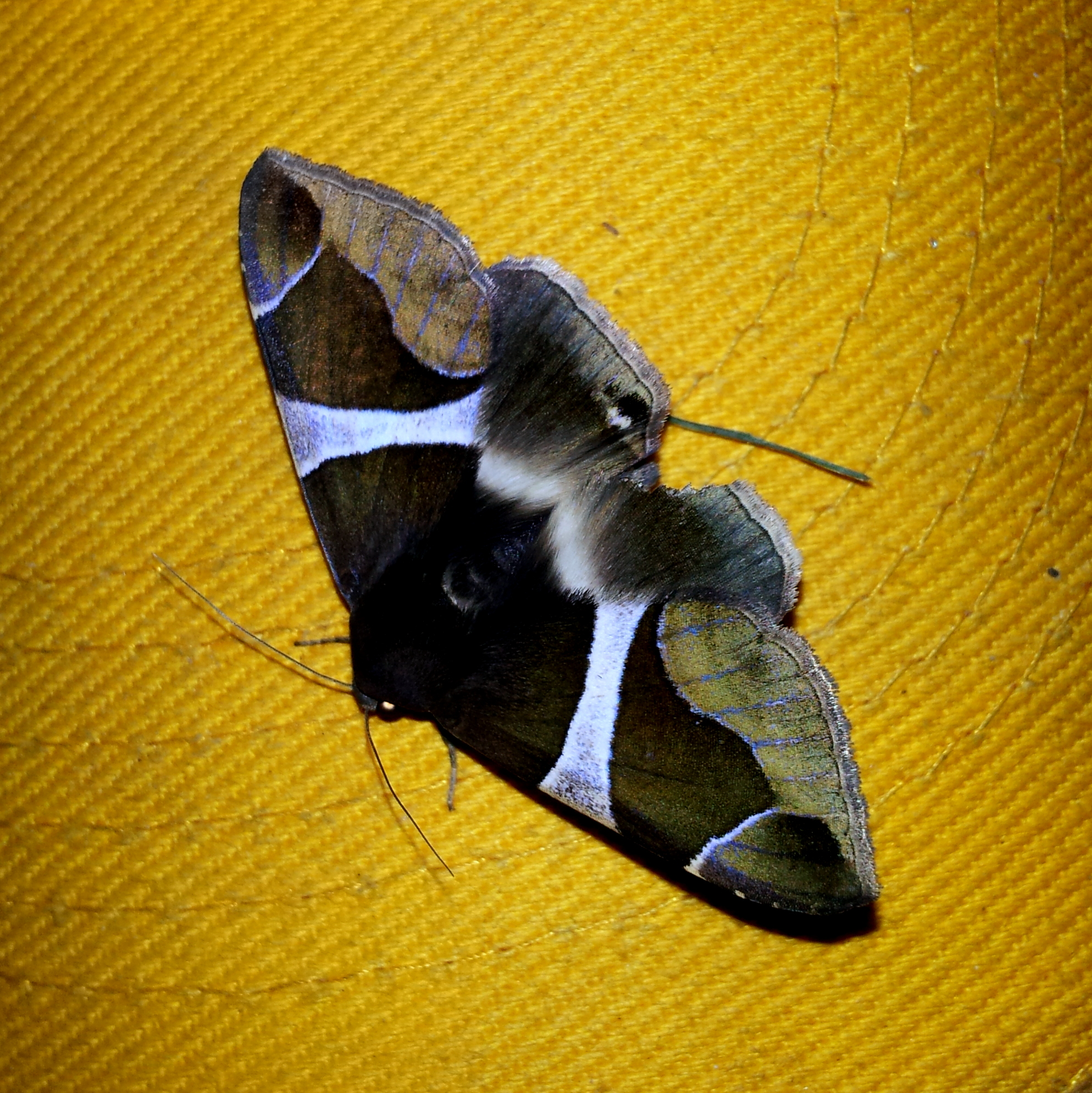
Bastilla crameri

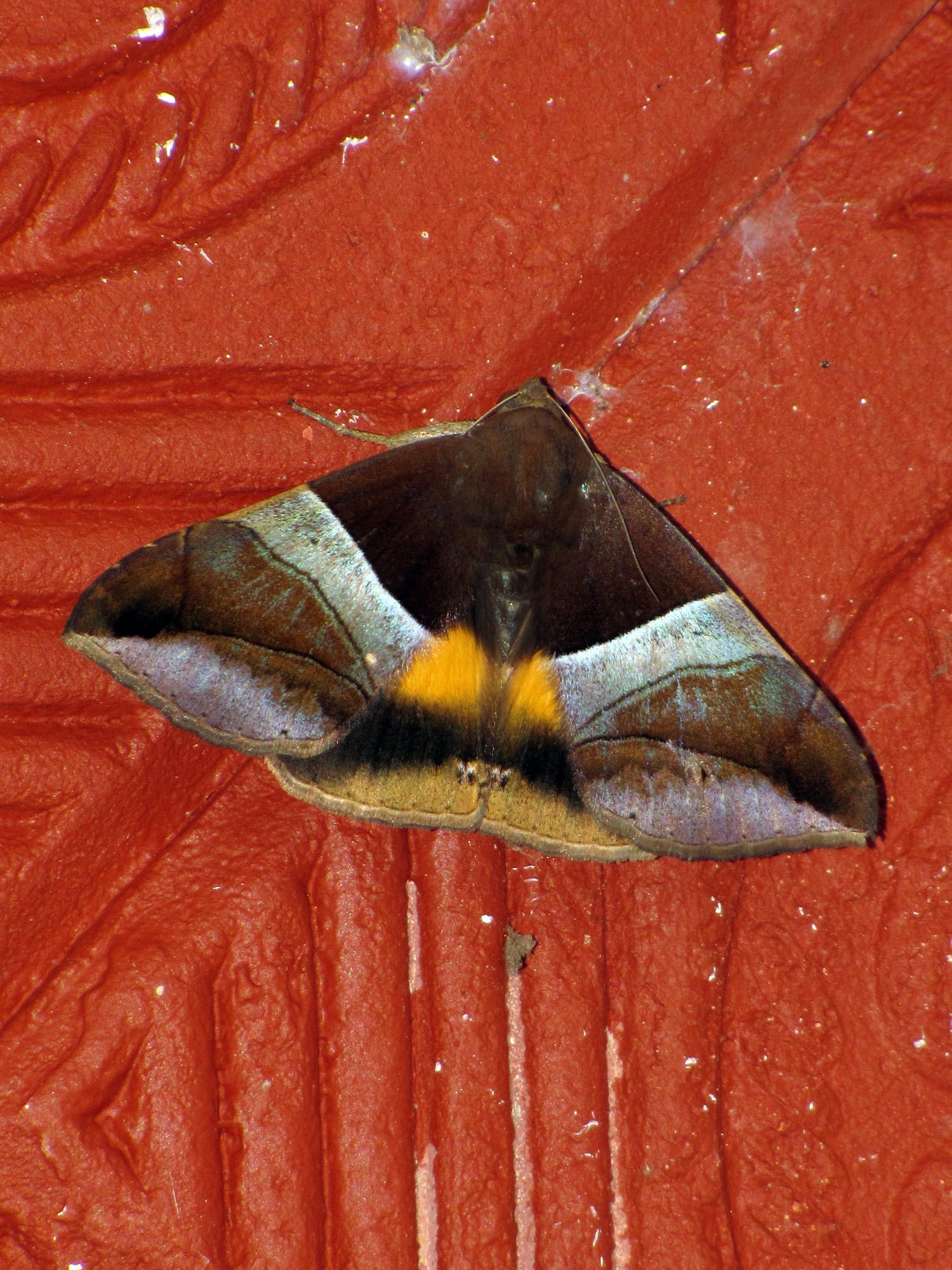
Bastilla fulvotaenia

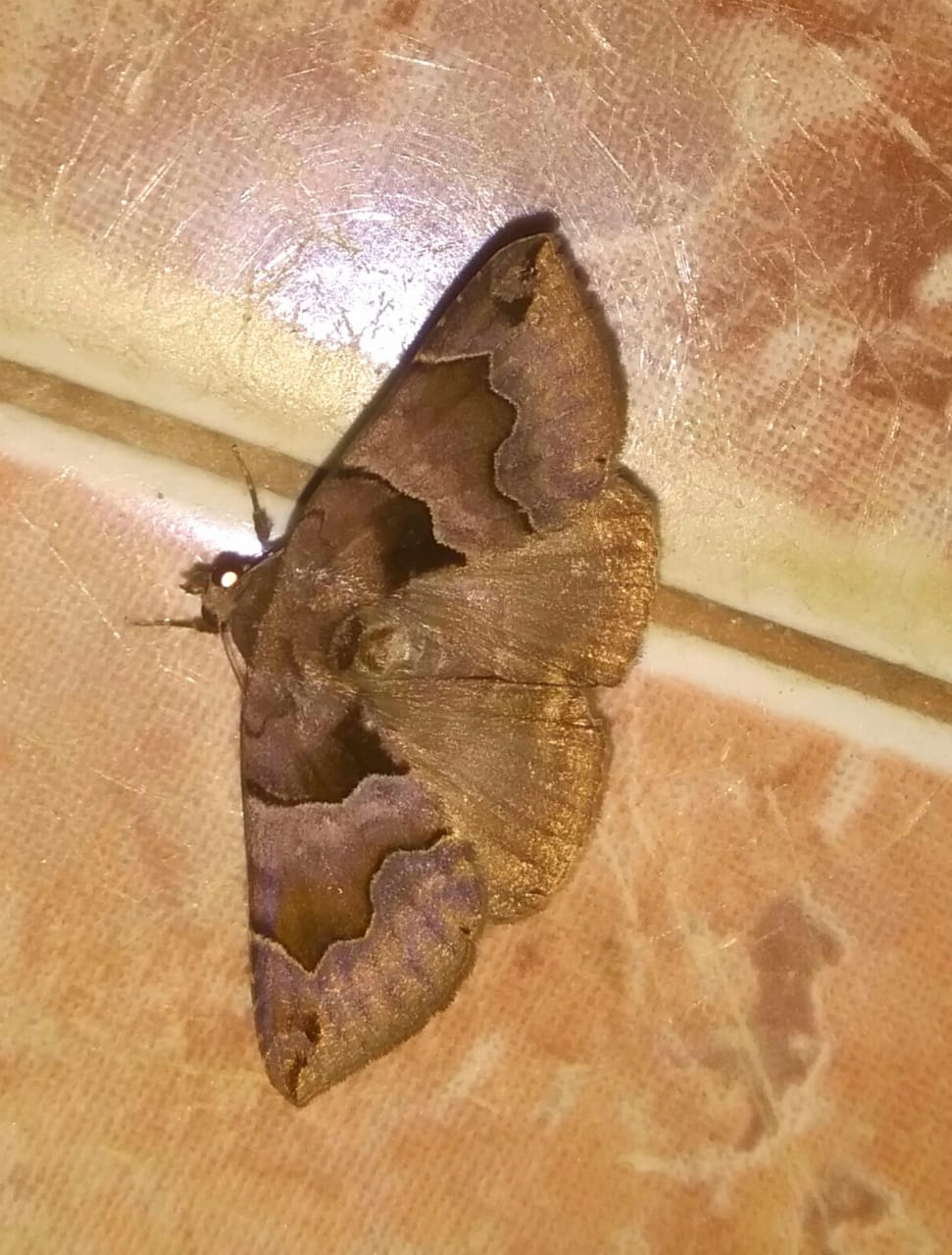
Bastilla simillima

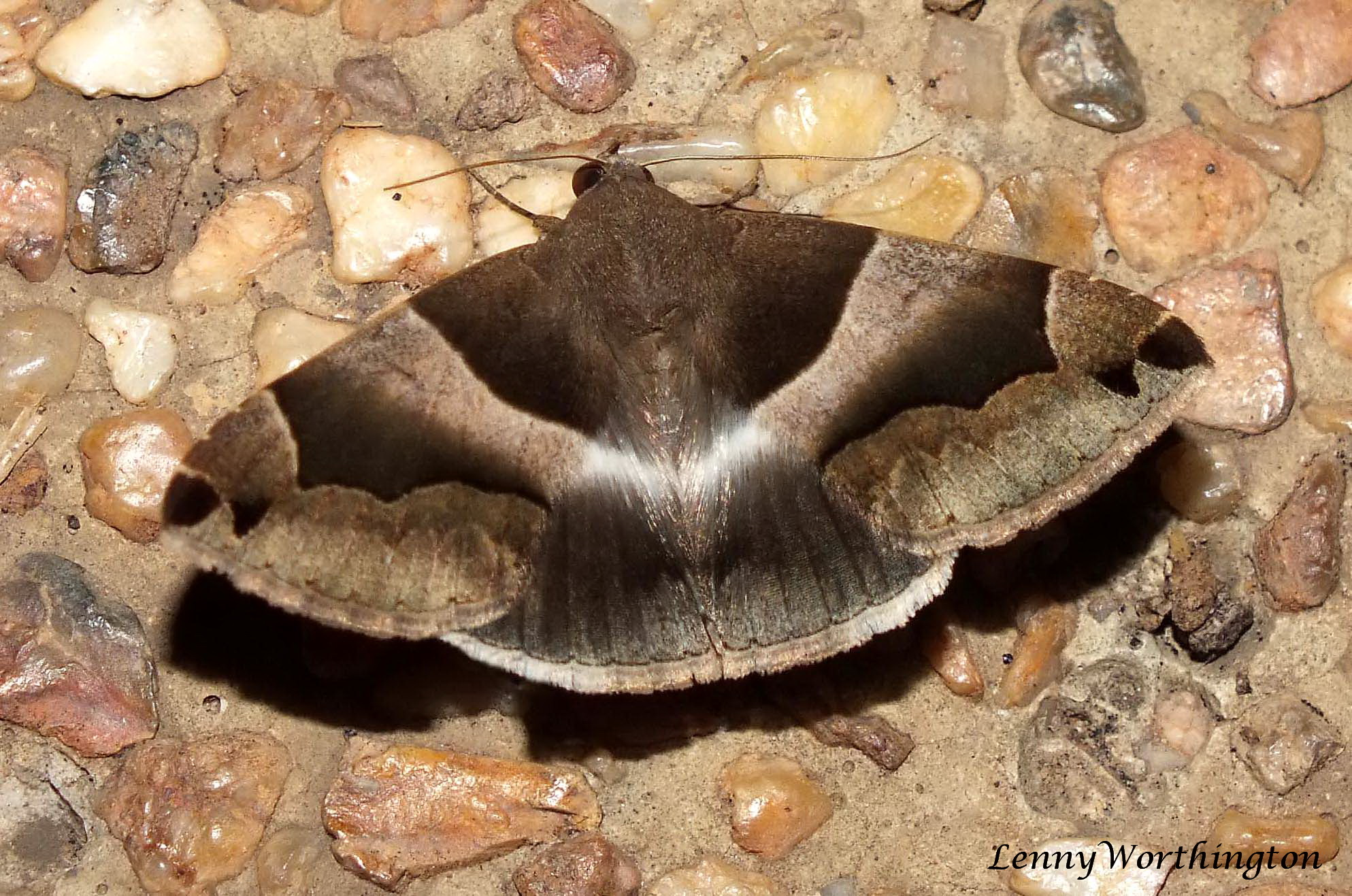
Dysgonia stuposa

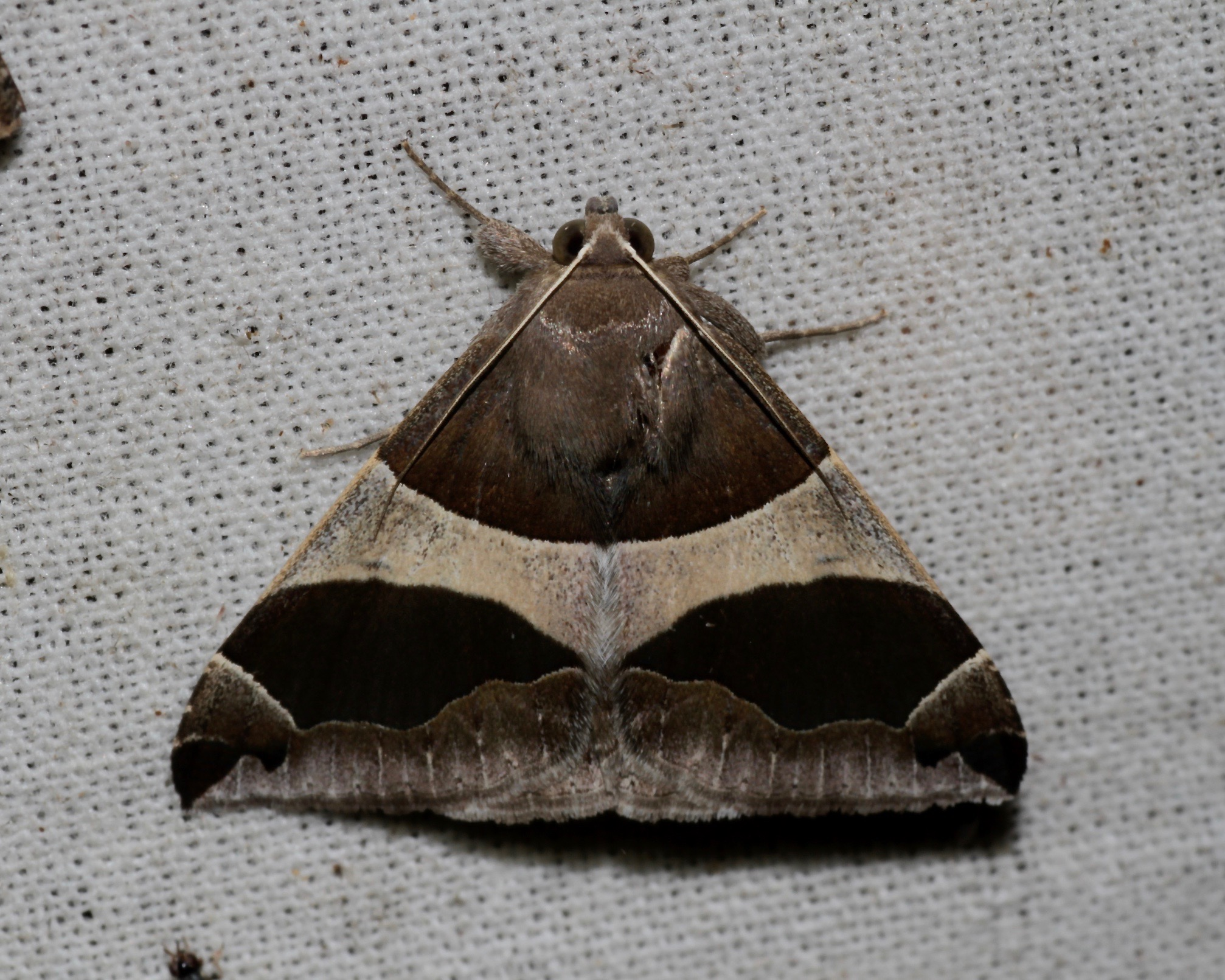
Dysgonia torrida

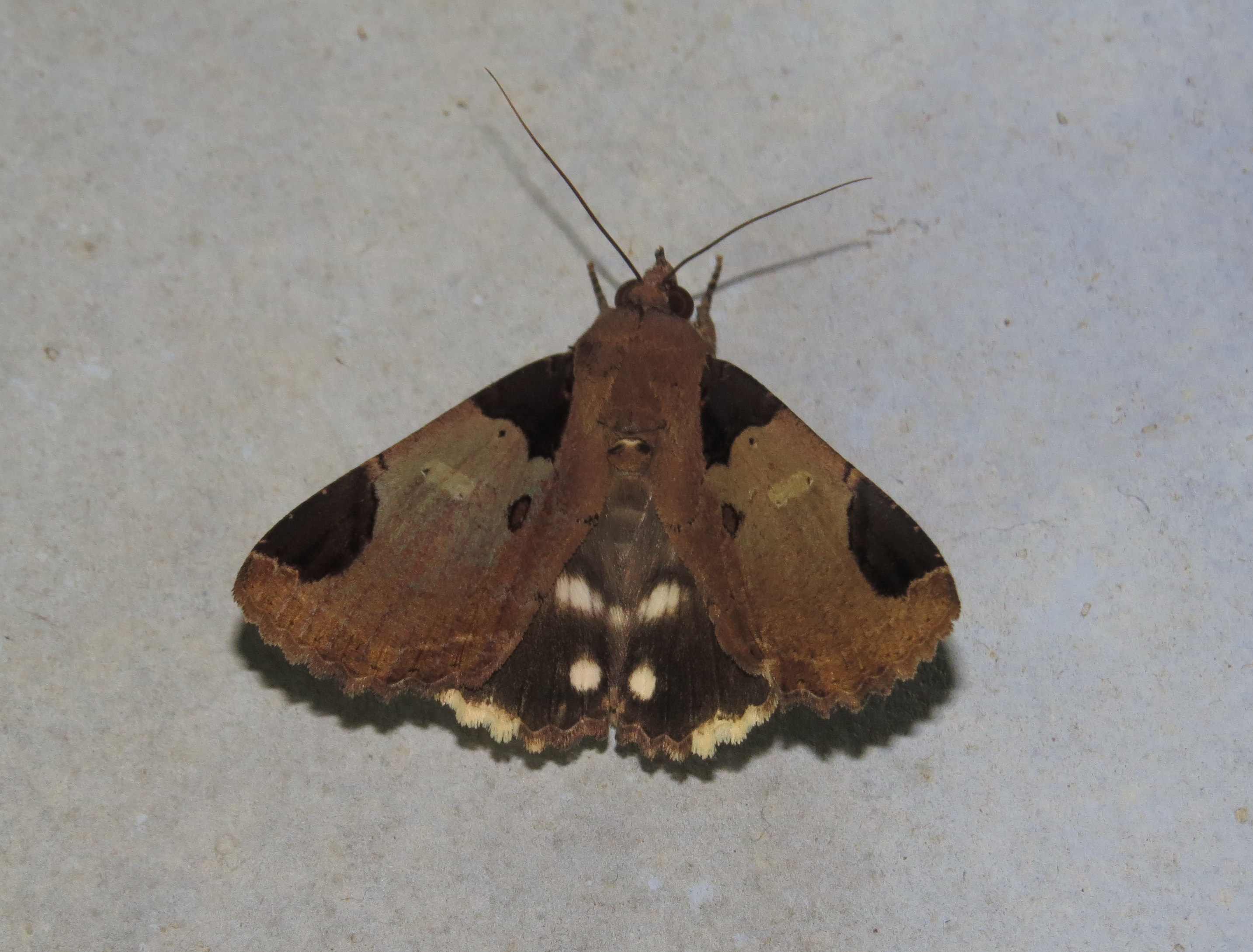
Ercheia cyllaria

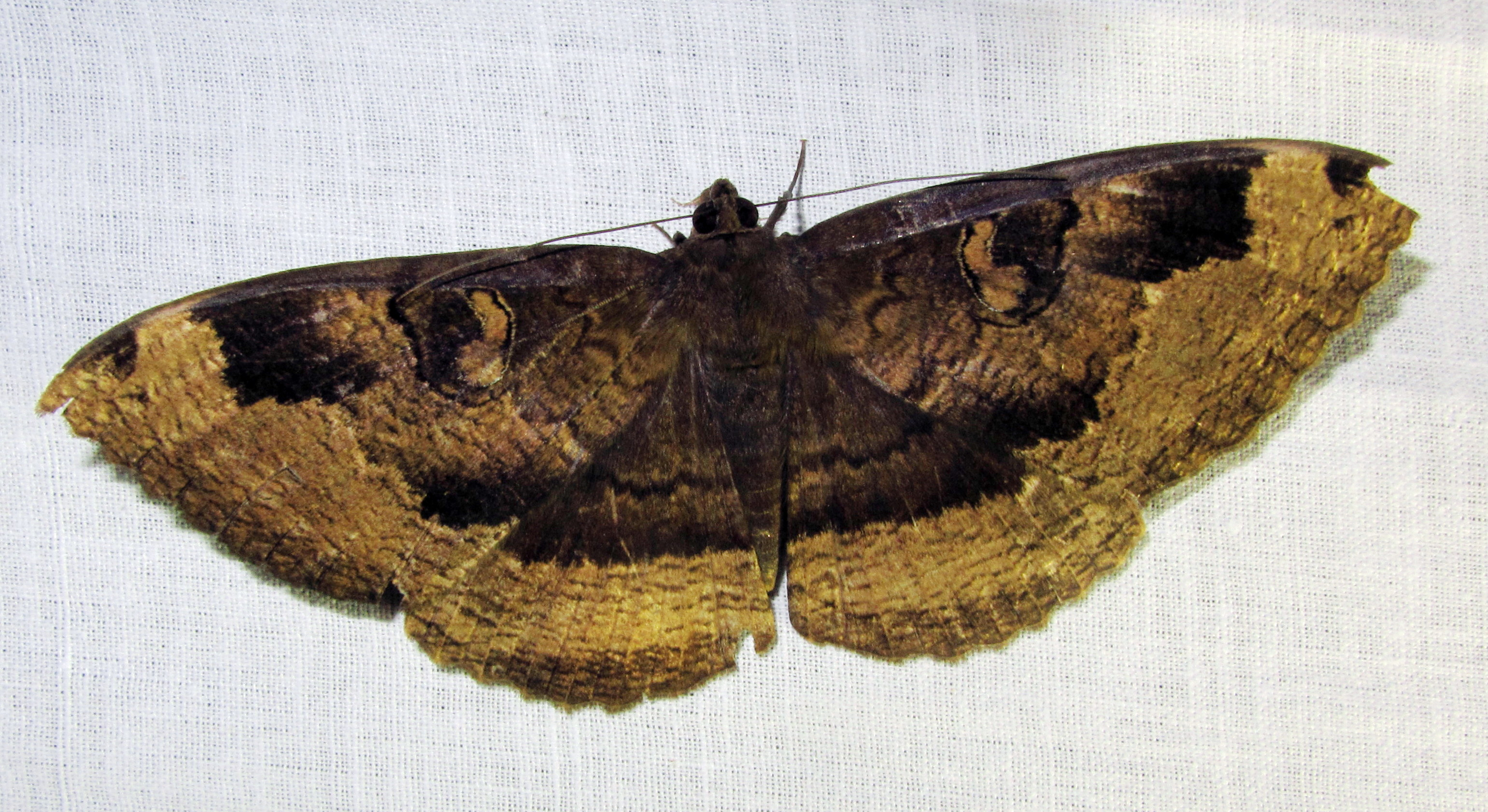
Erebus caprimulgus female

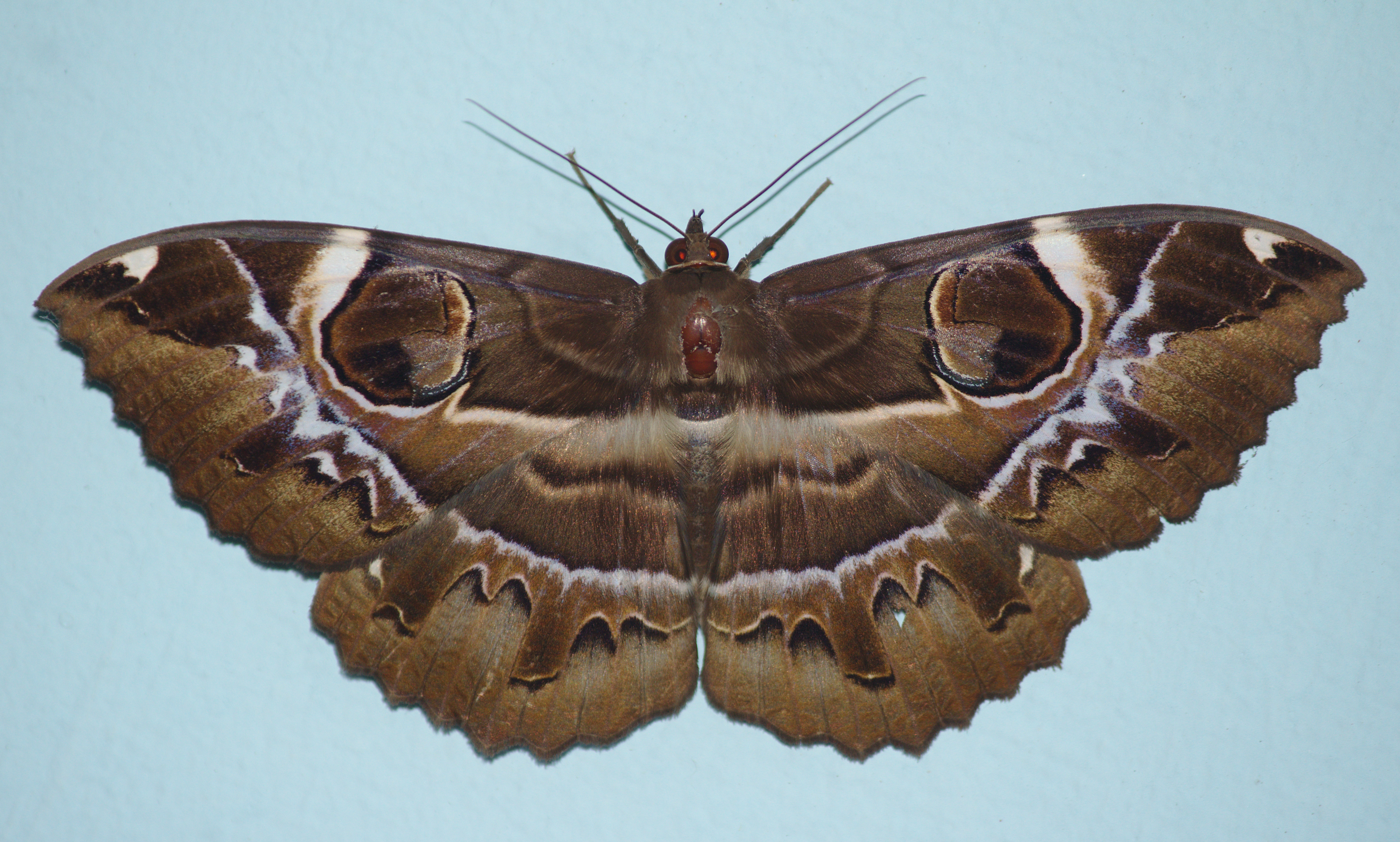
Erebus ephesperis

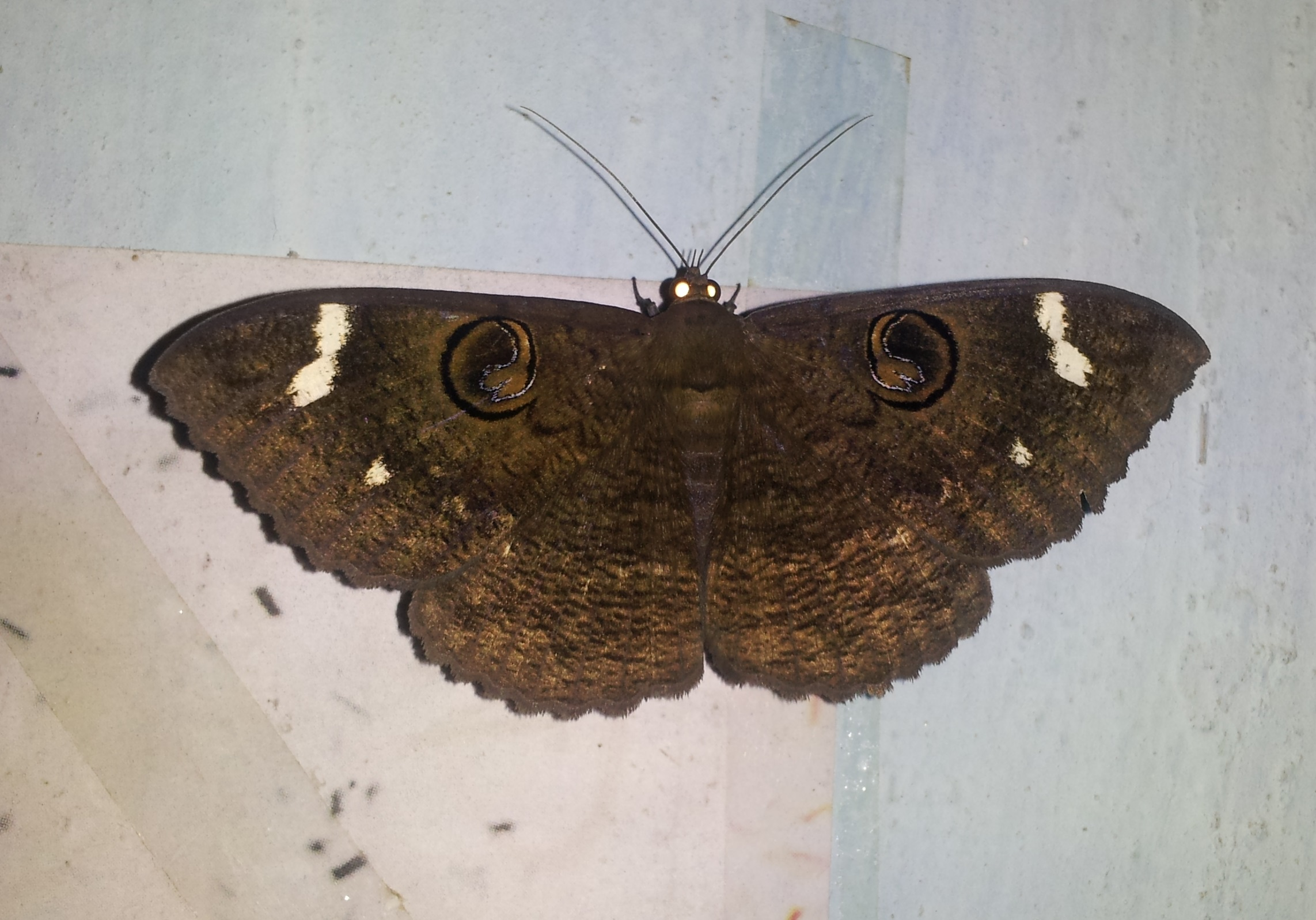
Erebus hieroglyphica

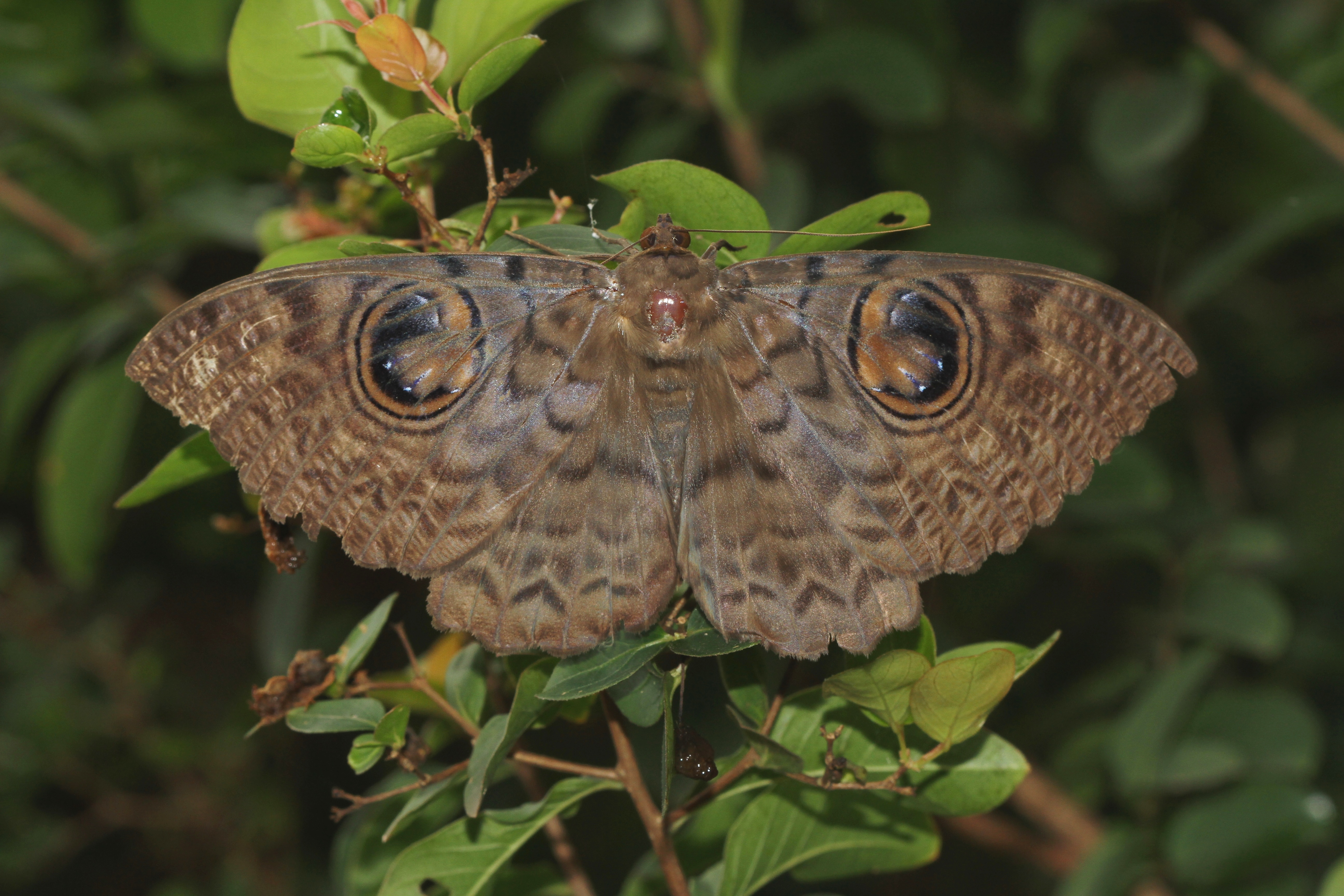
Erebus macrops

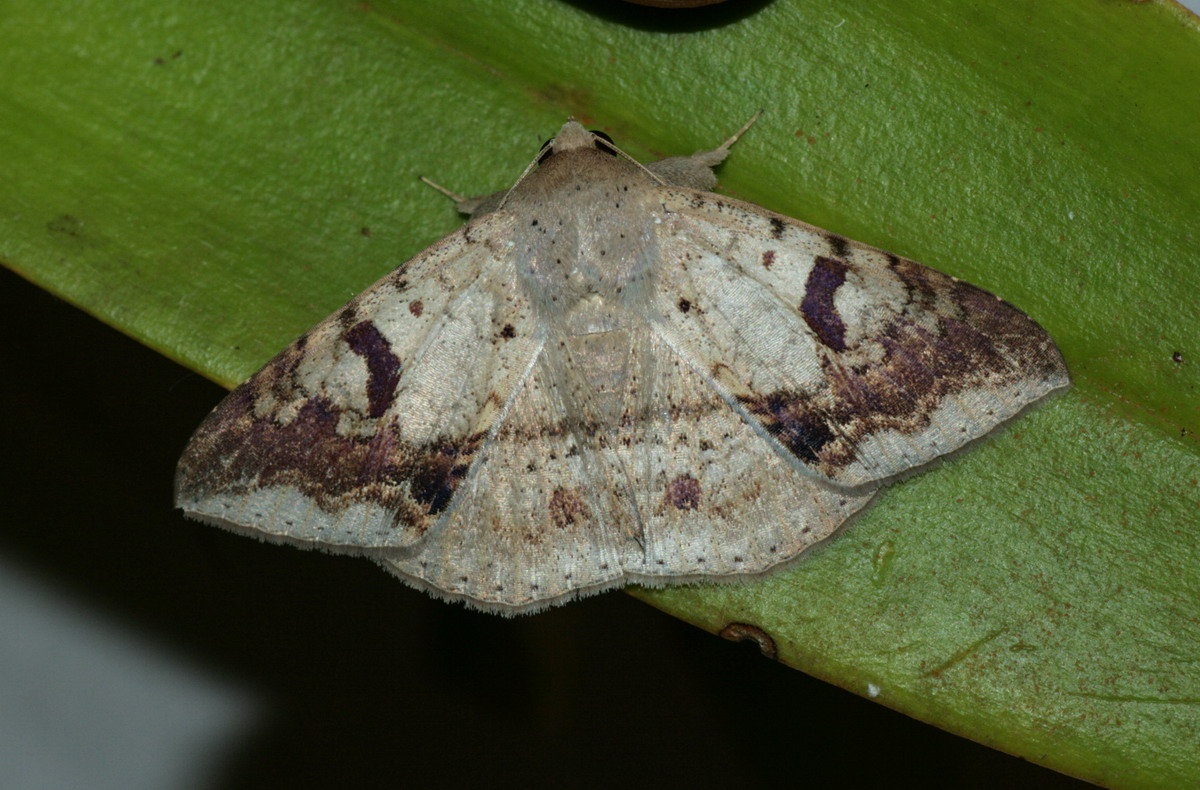
Ericeia eriphora male

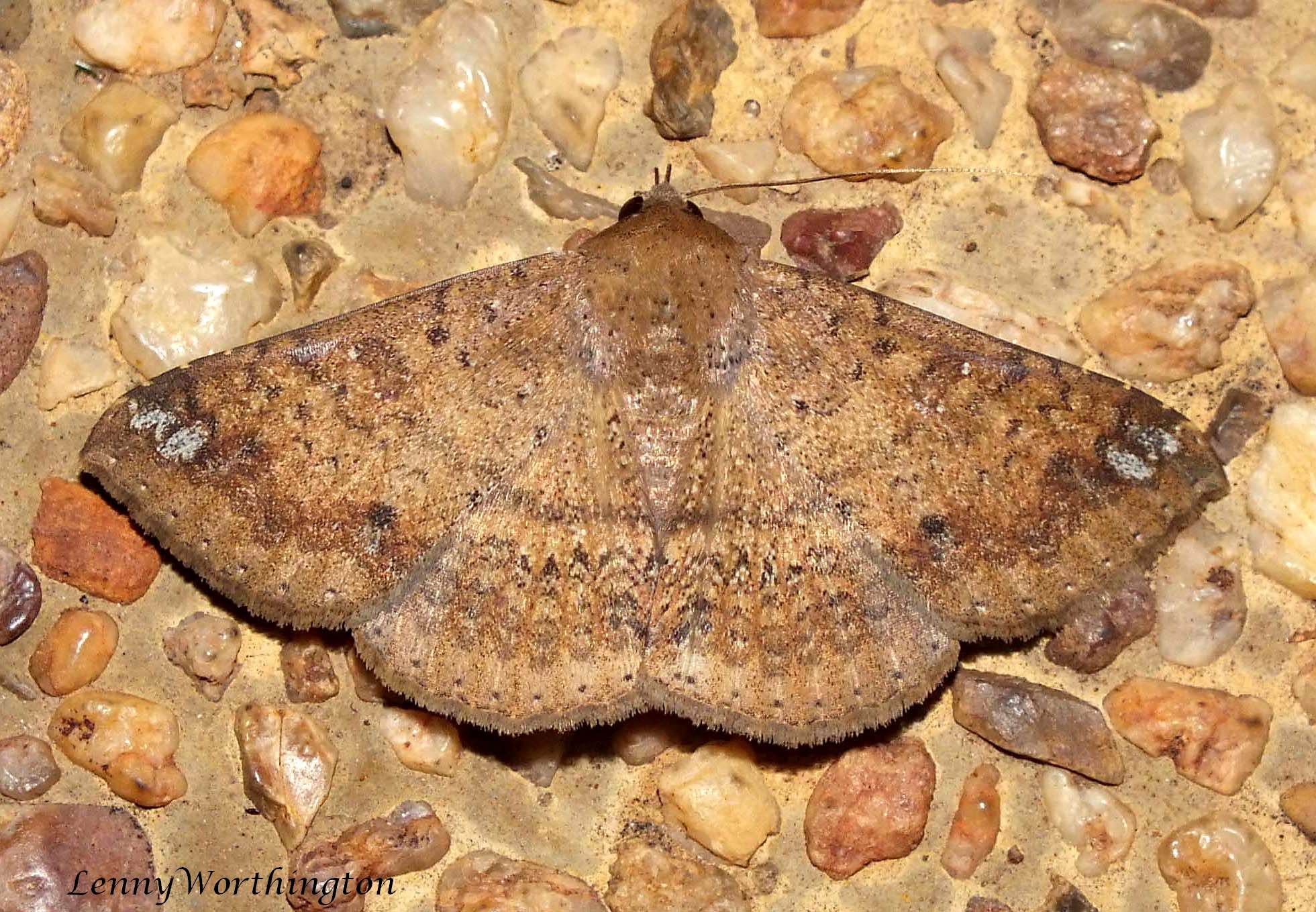
Ericeia inangulata

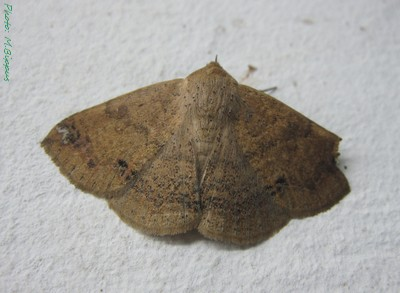
Ericeia lituraria

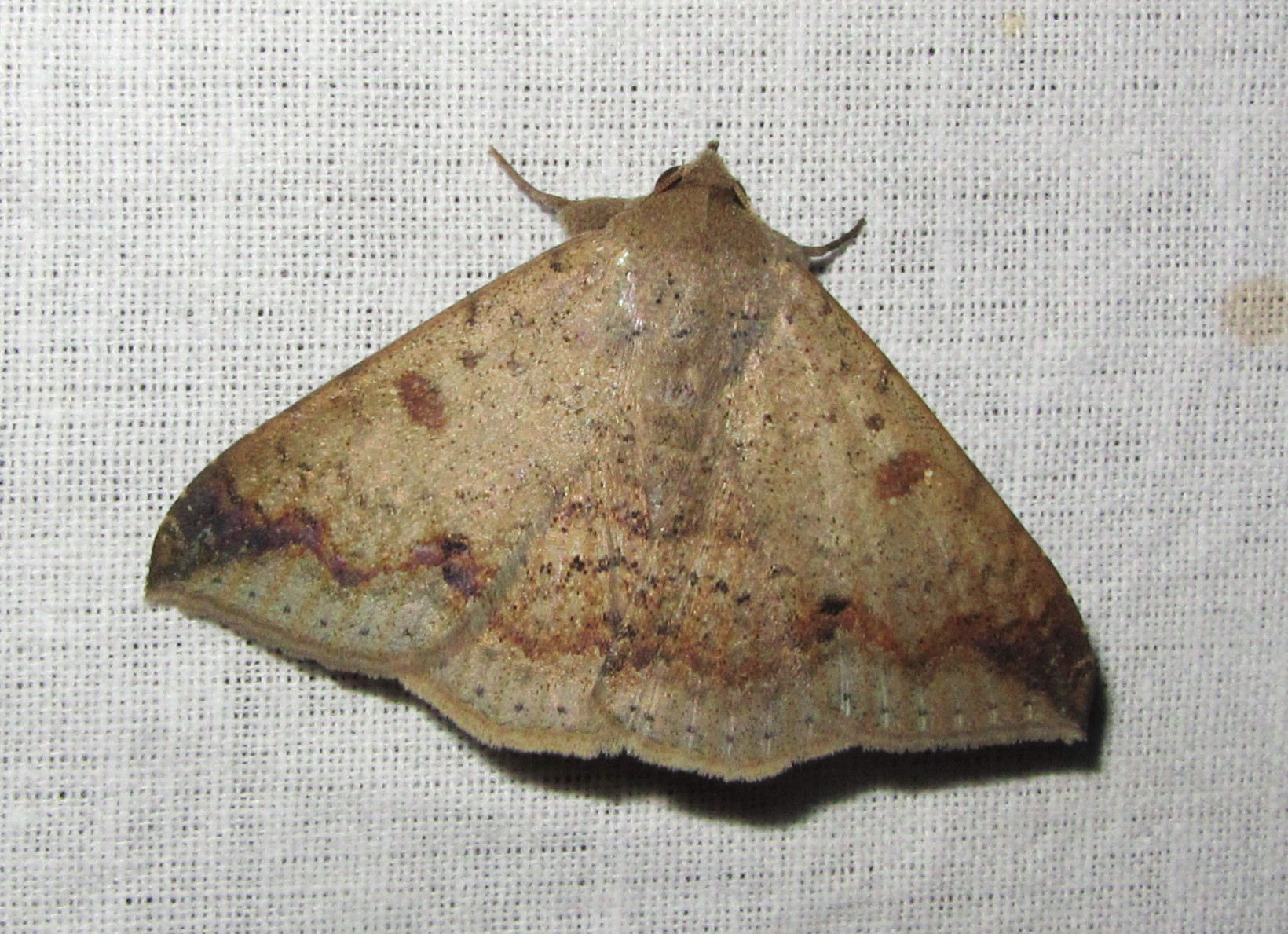
Ericeia pertendens

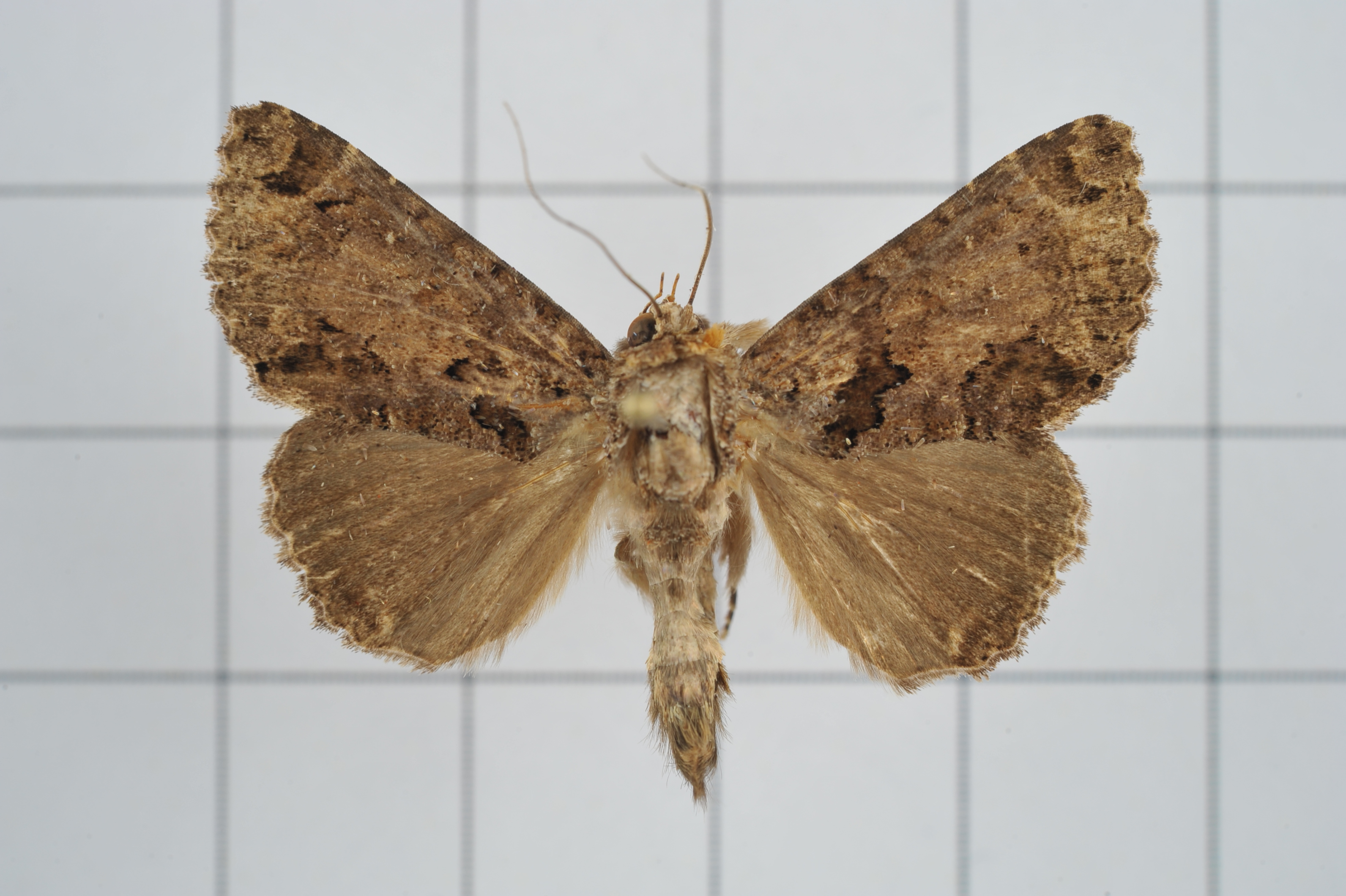
Erygia spissa

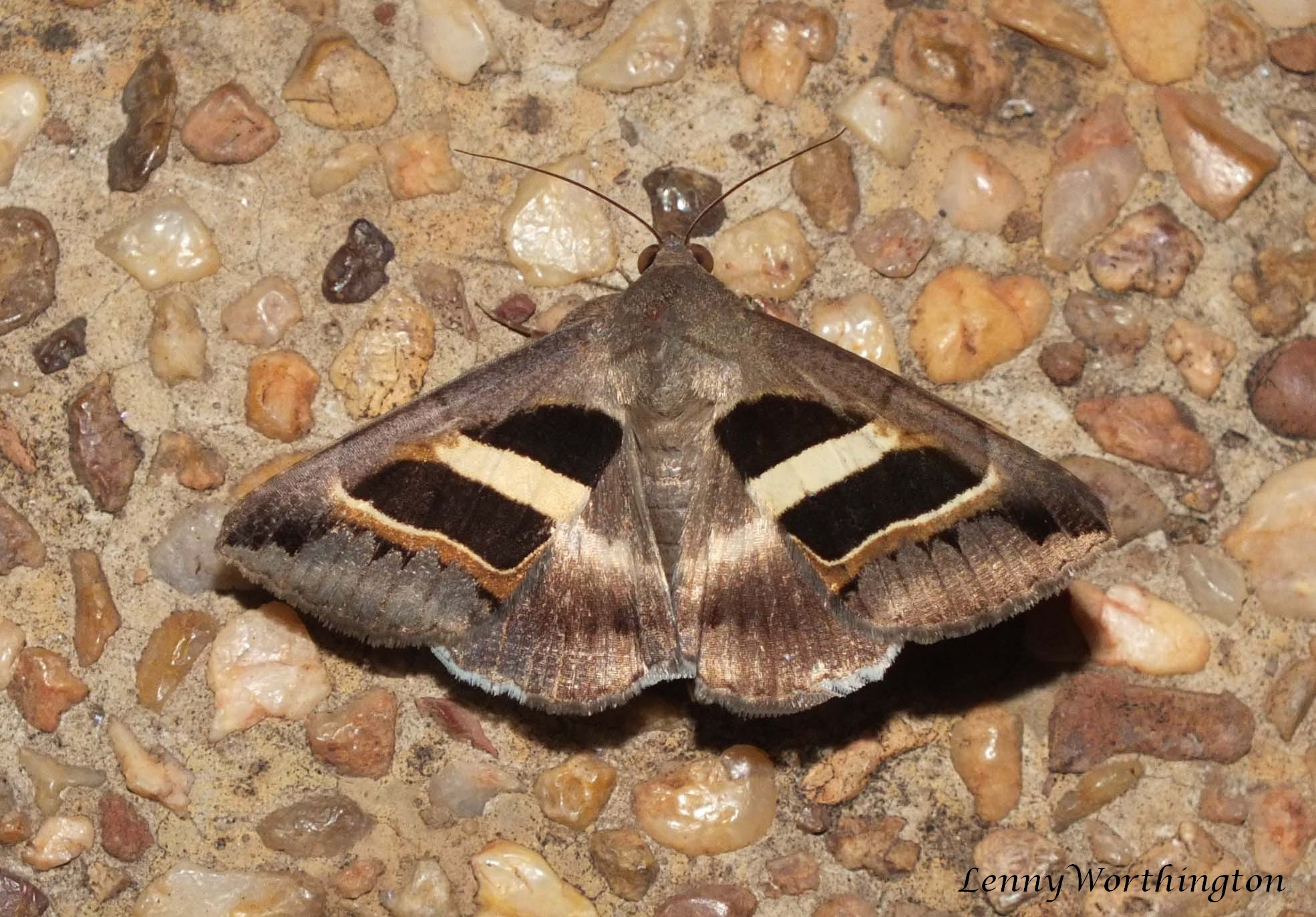
Grammodes geometrica

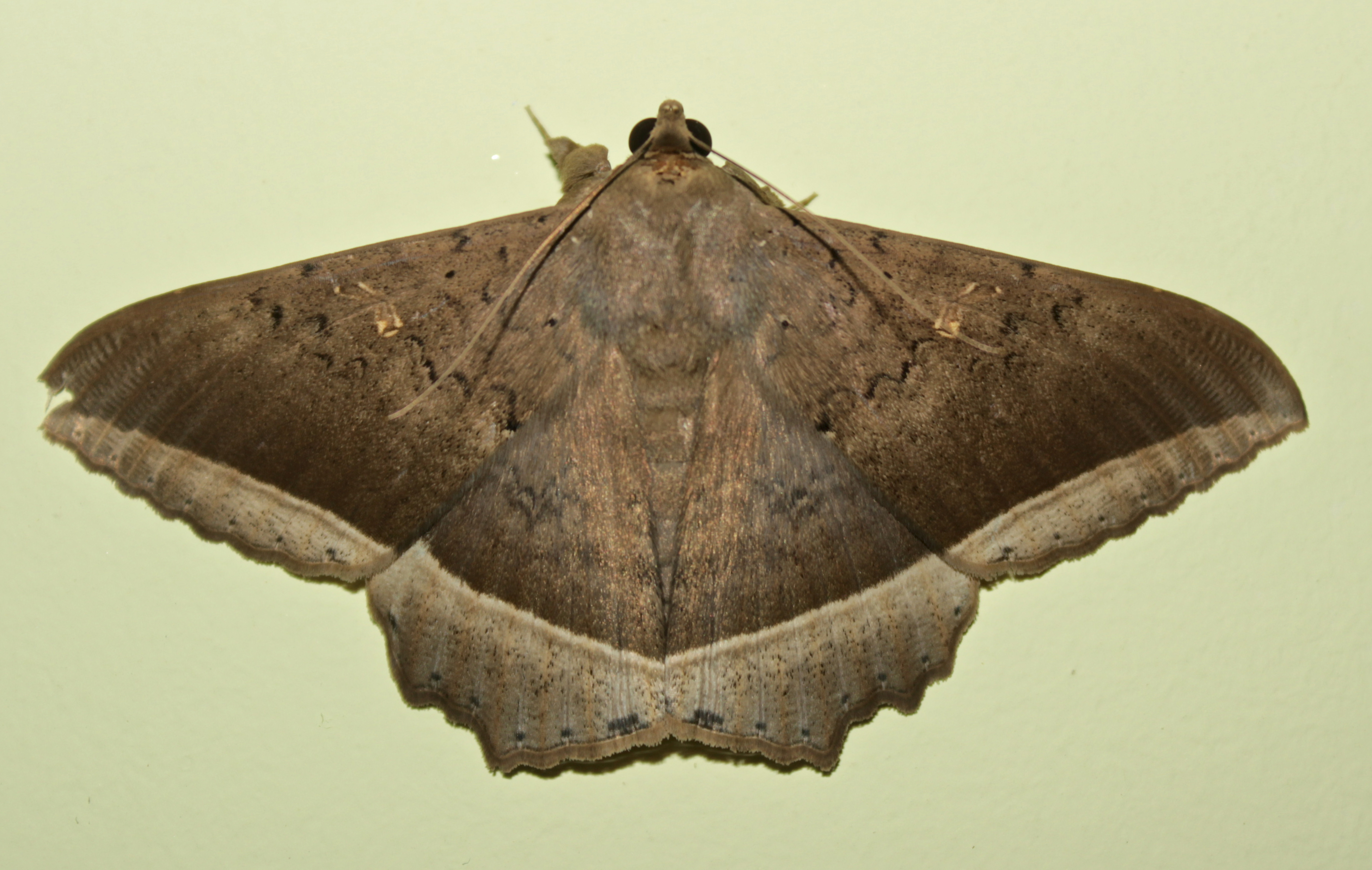
Hulodes caranea

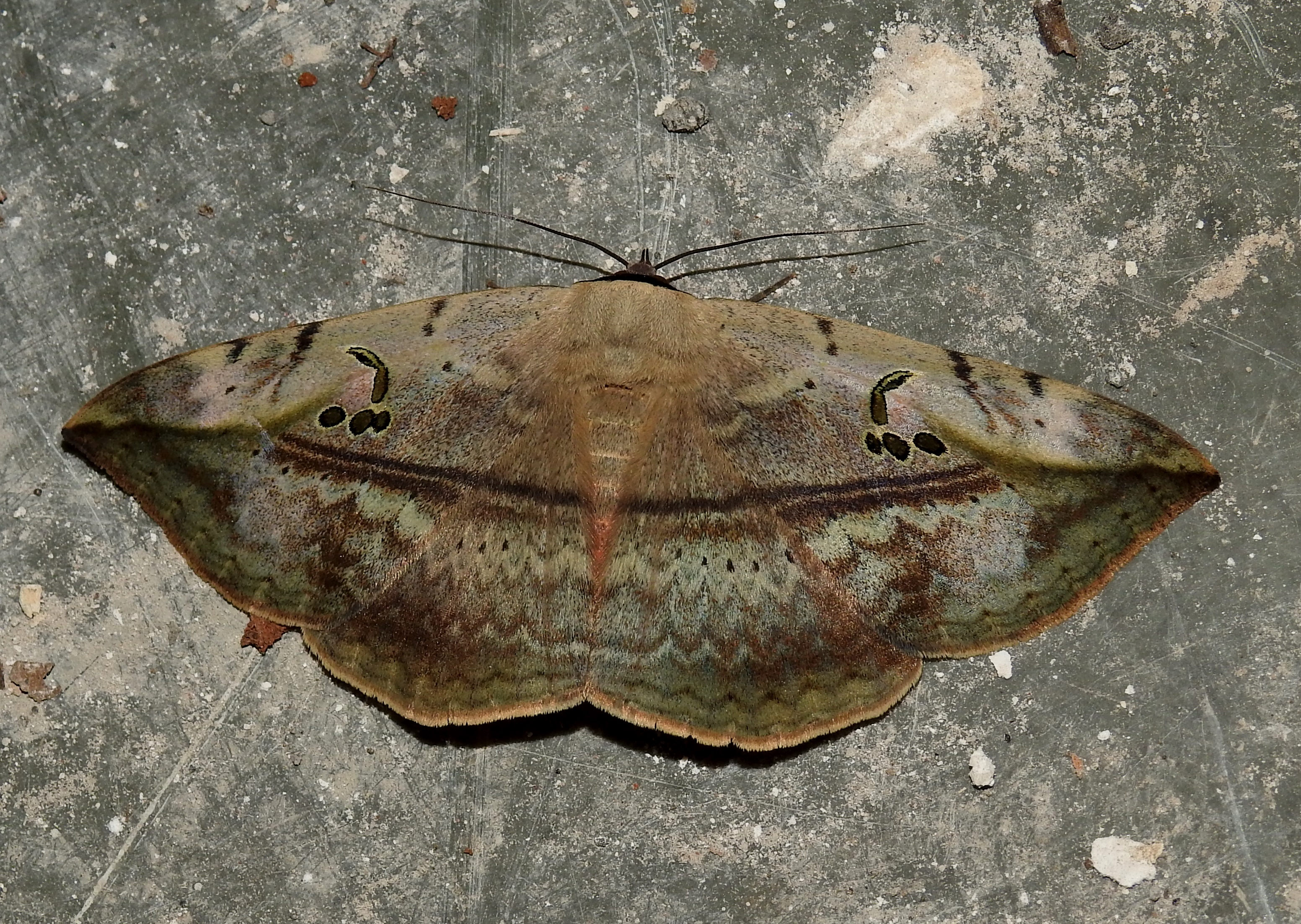
Hypopyra vespertilio

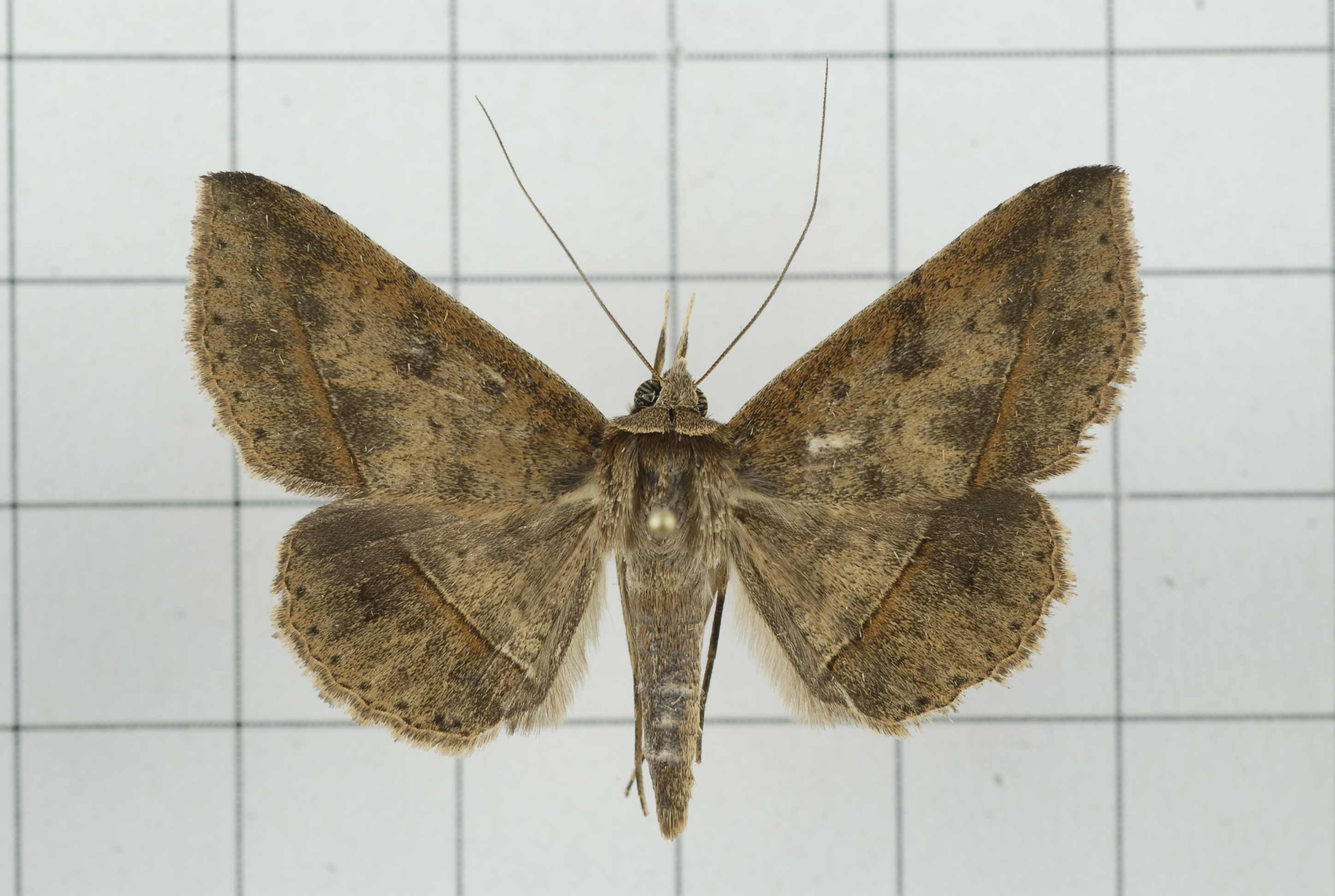
Hypospila bolinoides

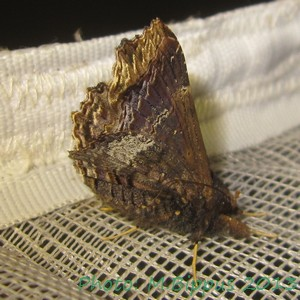
Lacera alope

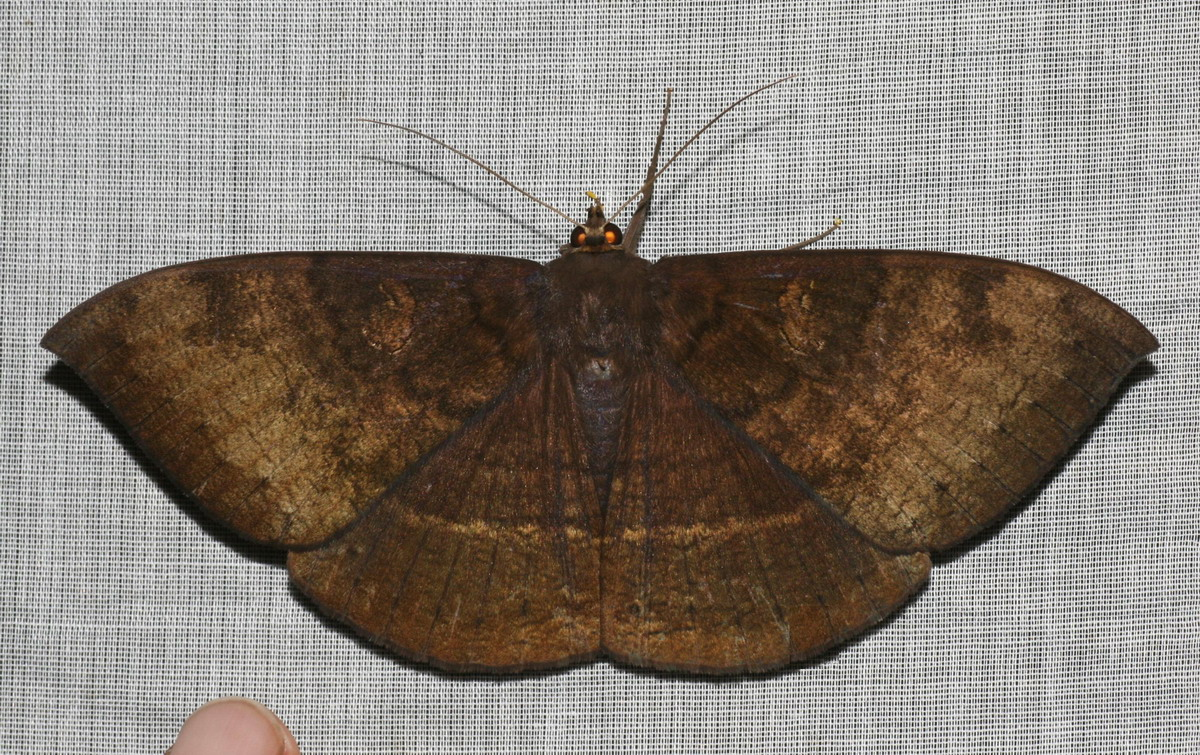
Lygniodes ciliata

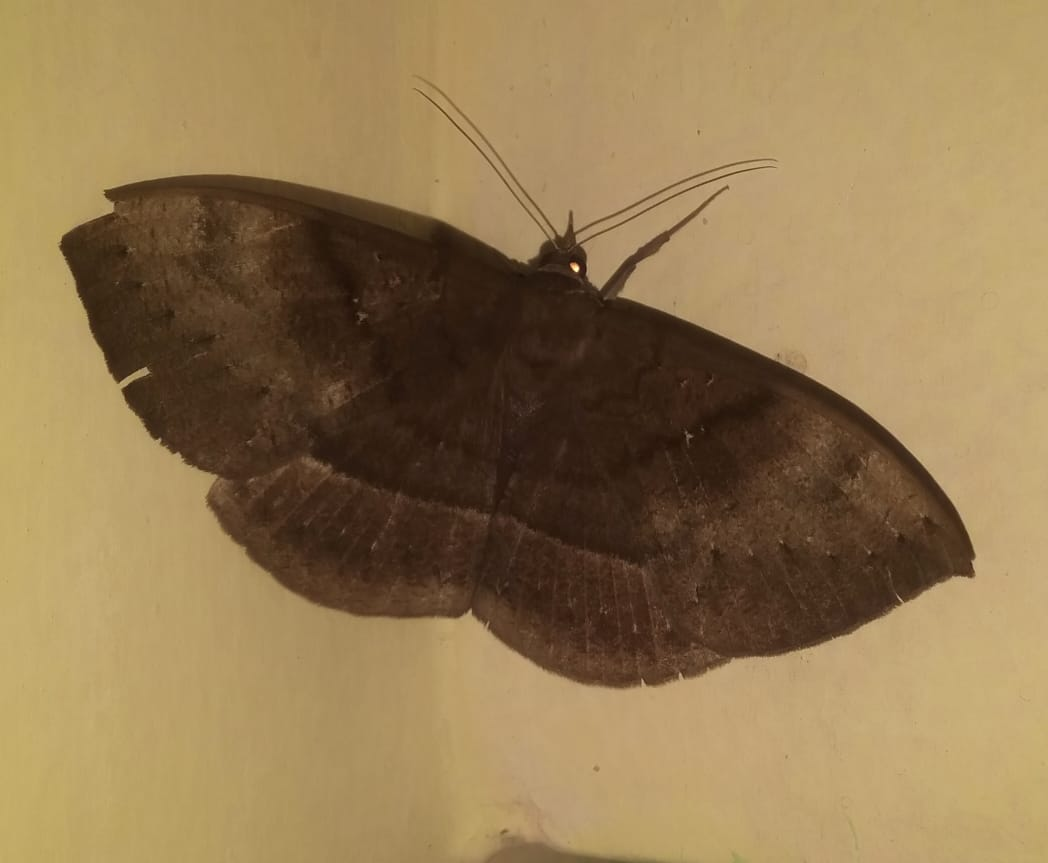
Lygniodes vampyrus male

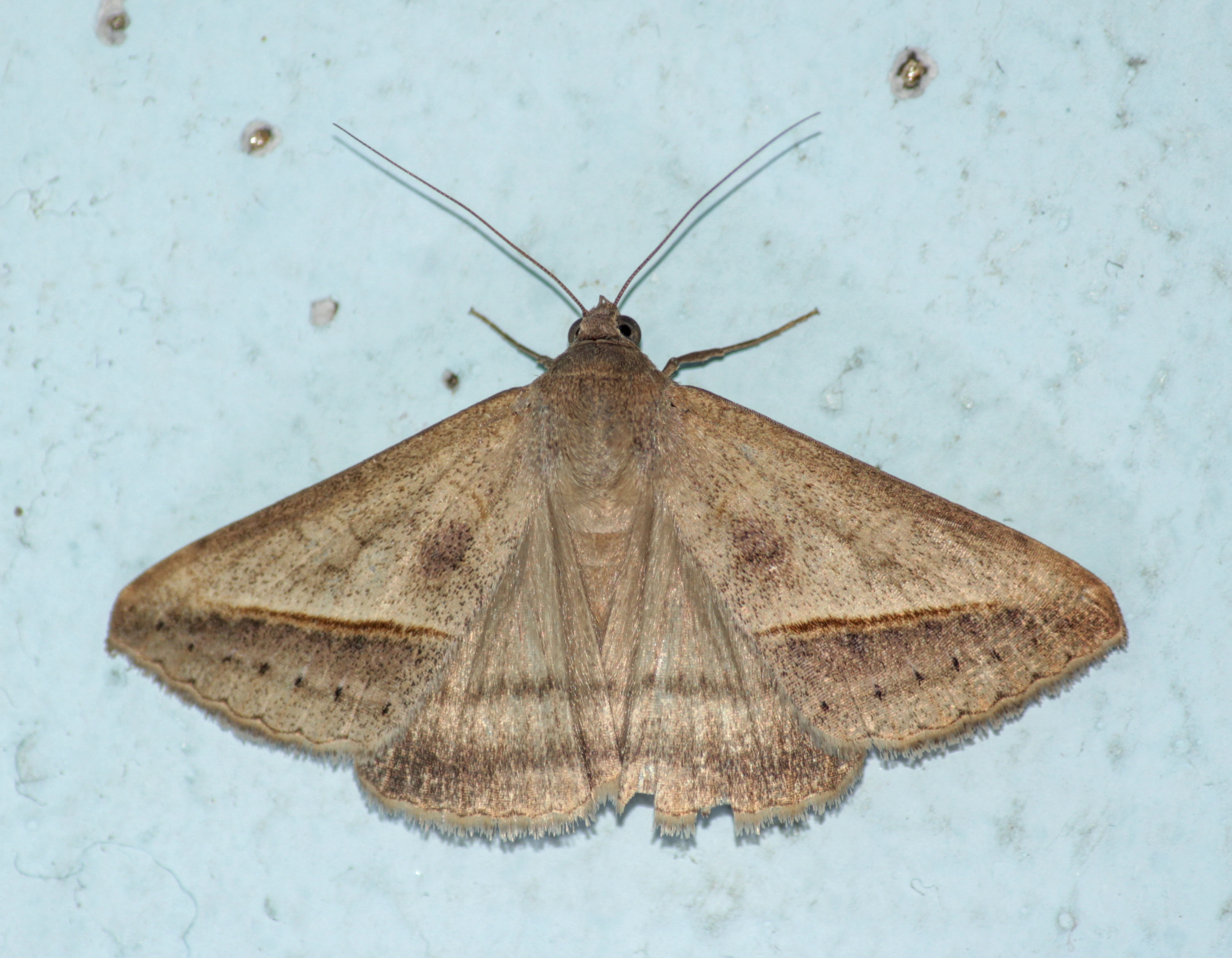
Mocis frugalis

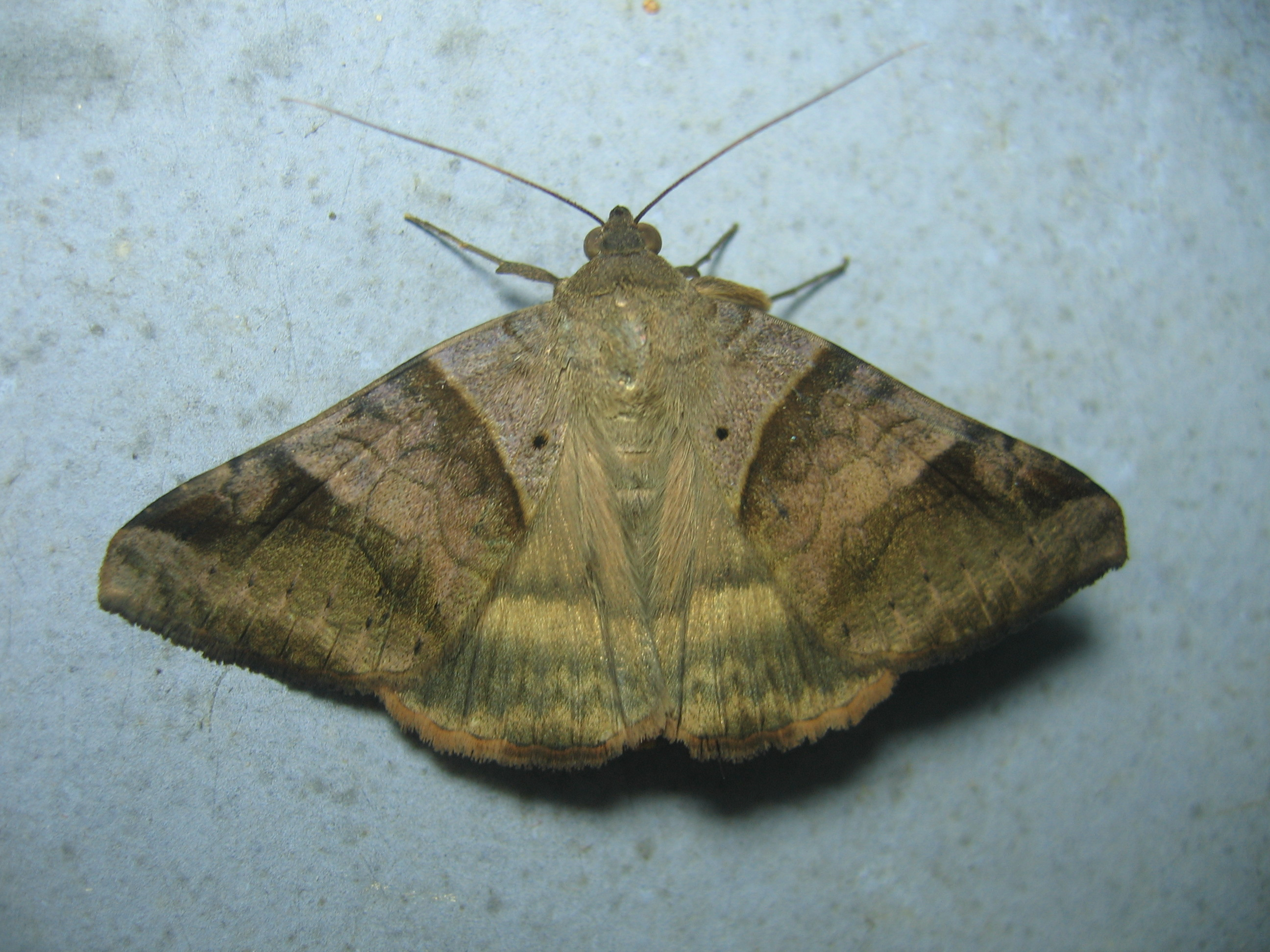
Mocis undata

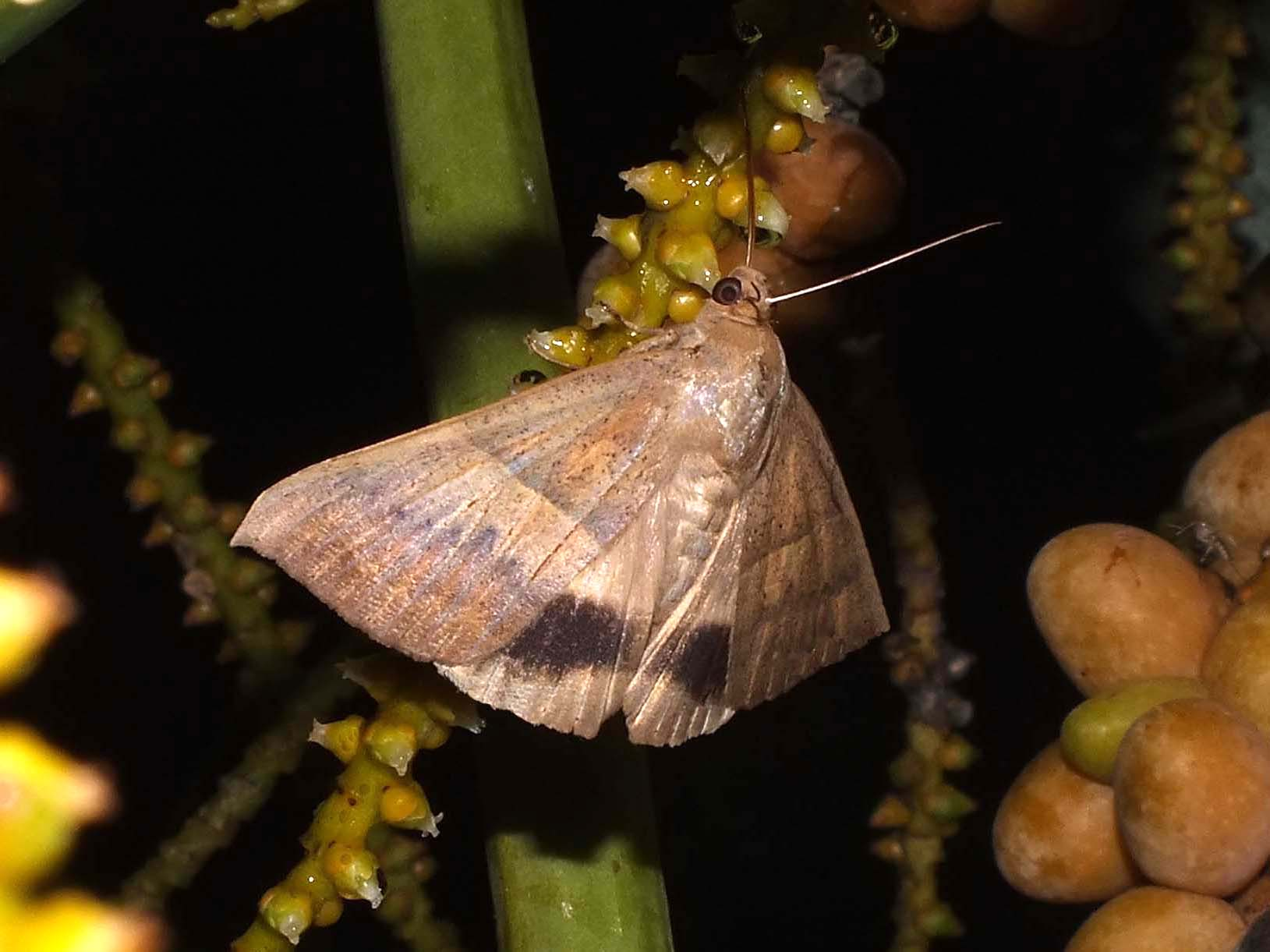
Ophisma gravata

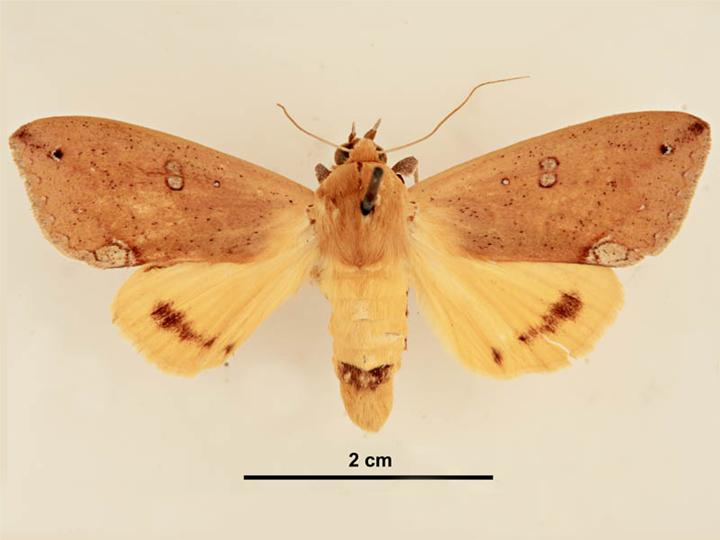
Ophiusa discriminans male

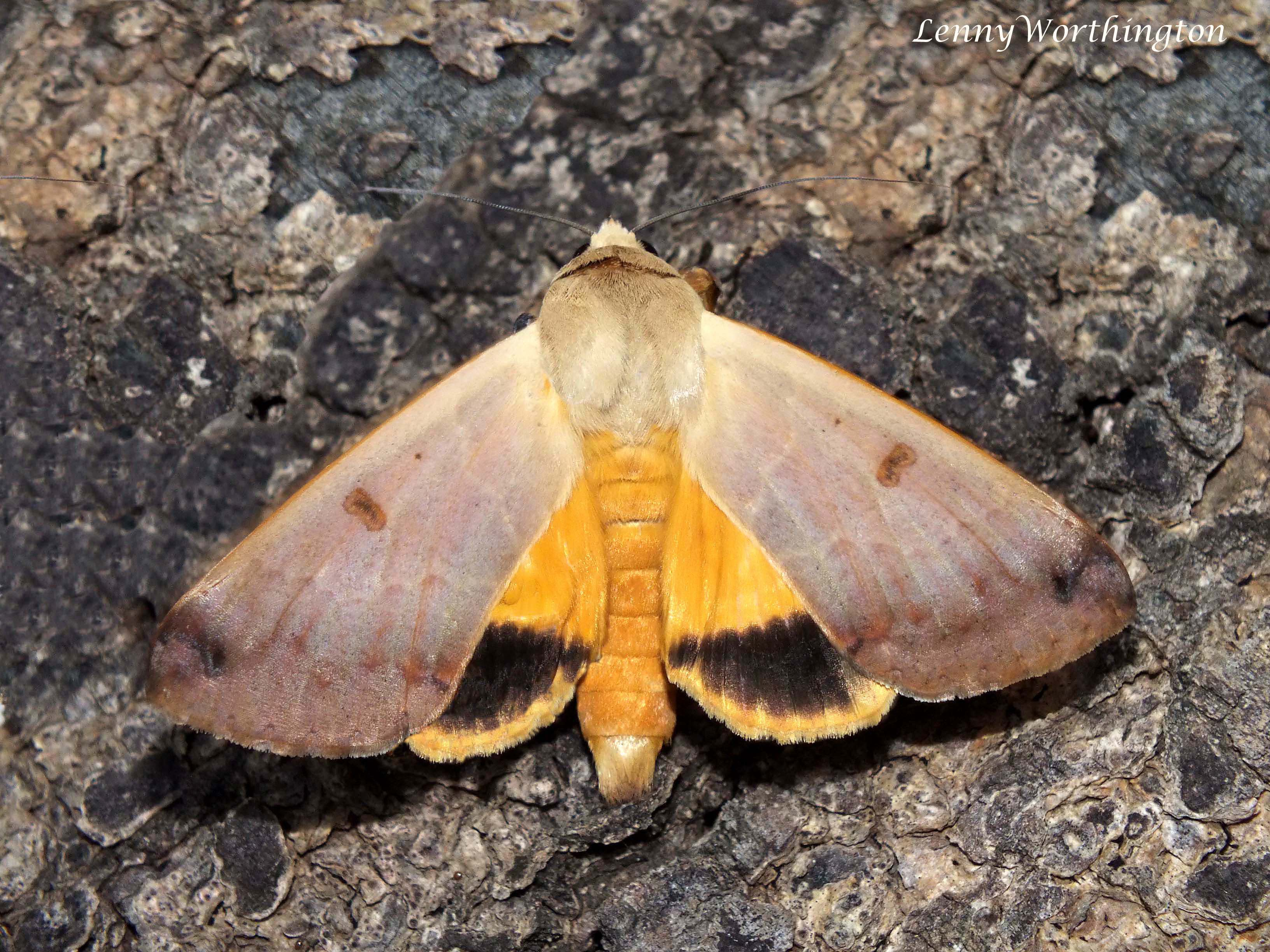
Ophiusa disjungens

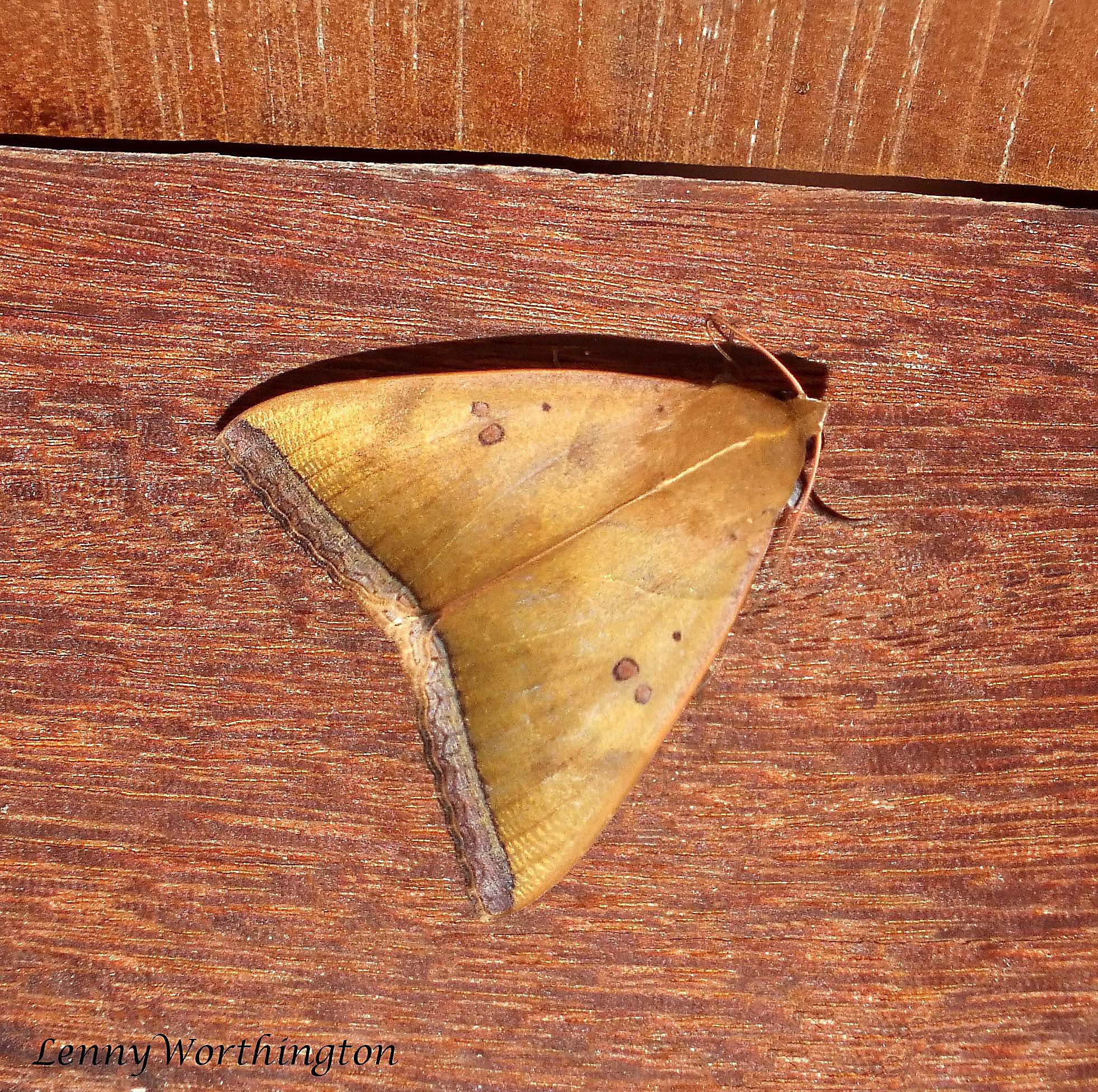
Ophiusa trapezium

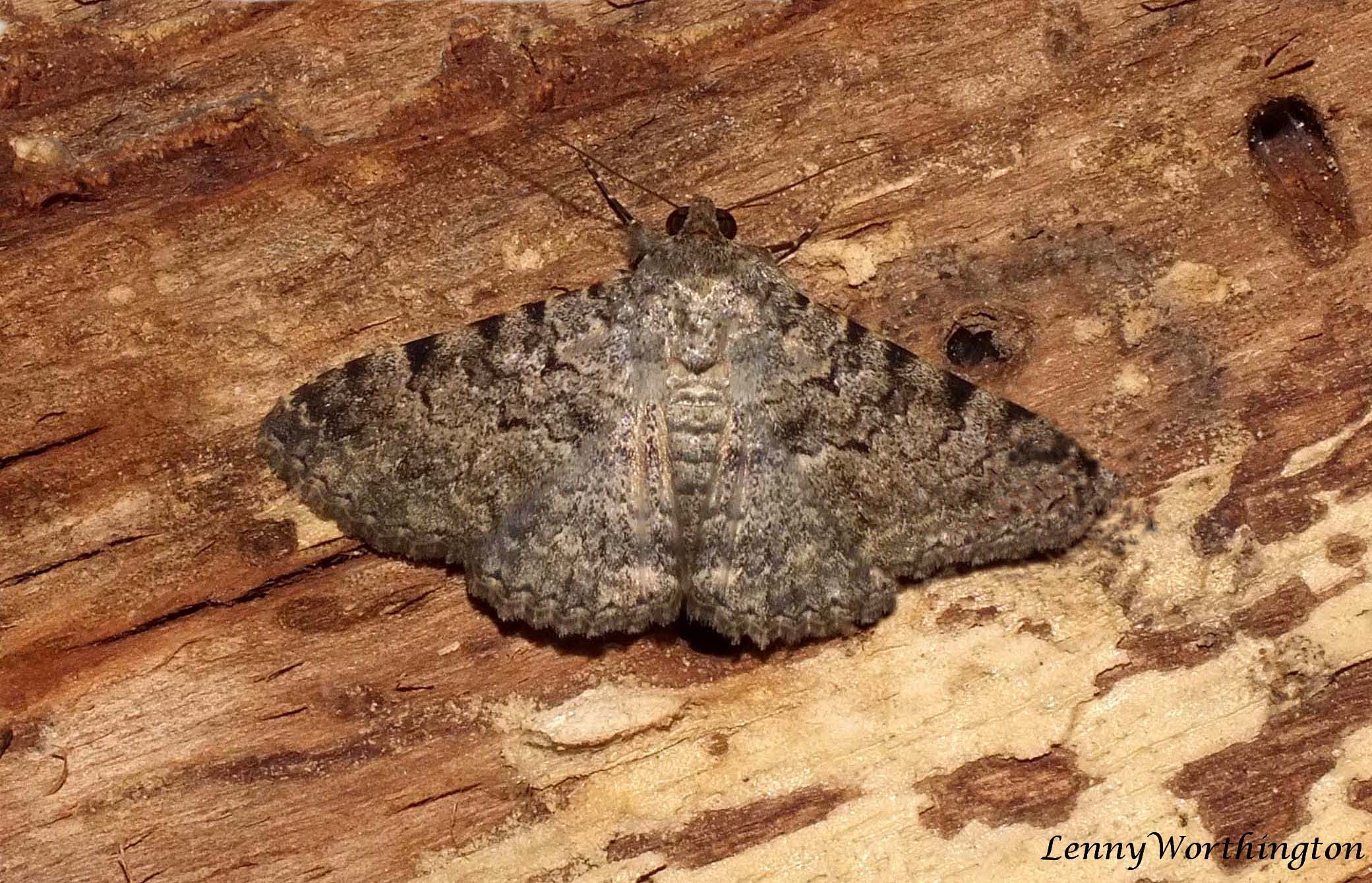
Polydesma boarmoides

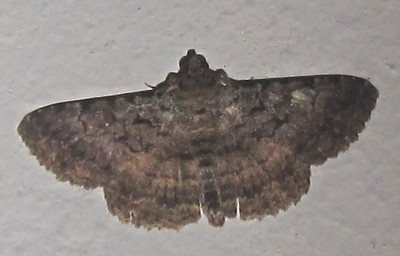
Polydesma umbricola

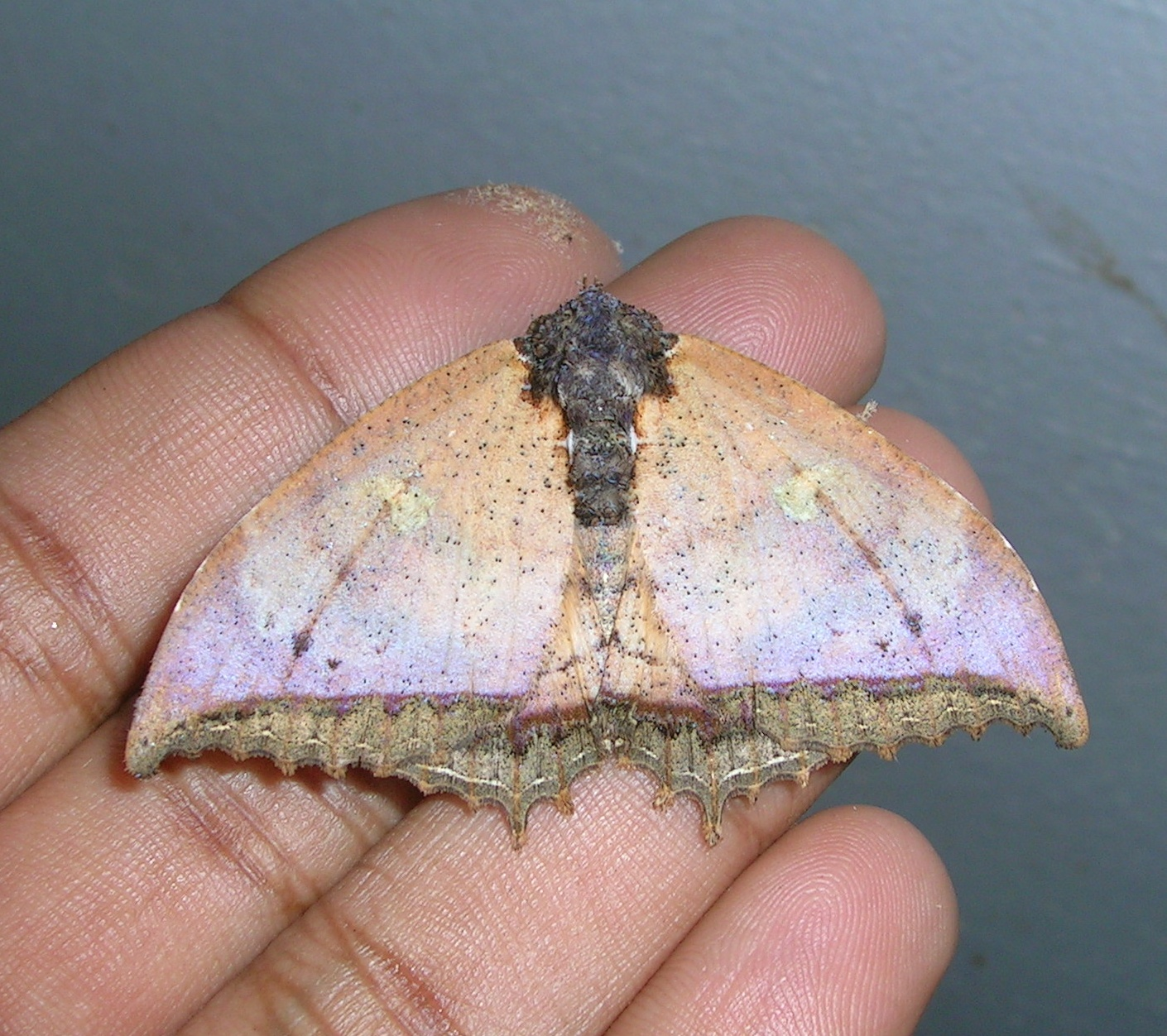
Pterocyclophora pictimargo

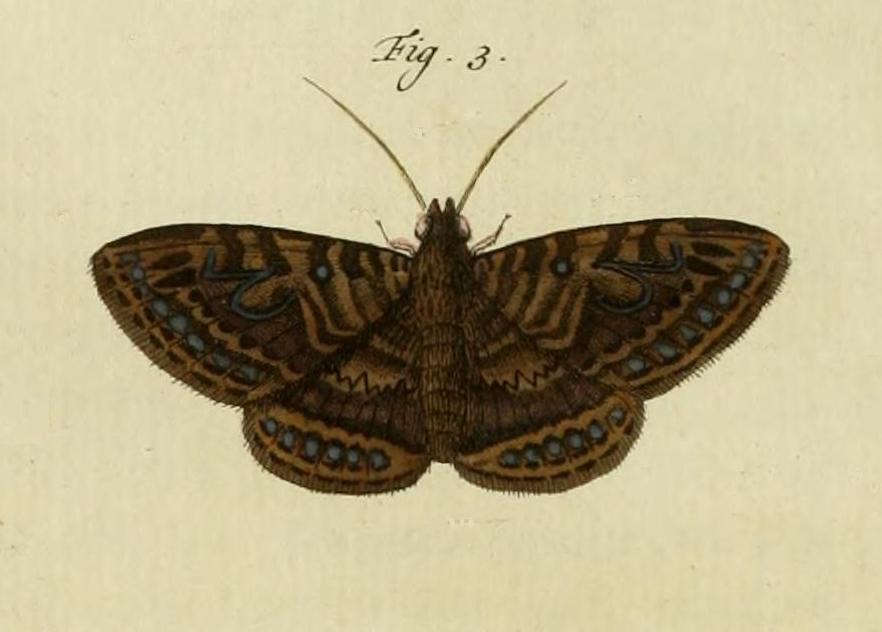
Speiredonia itynx

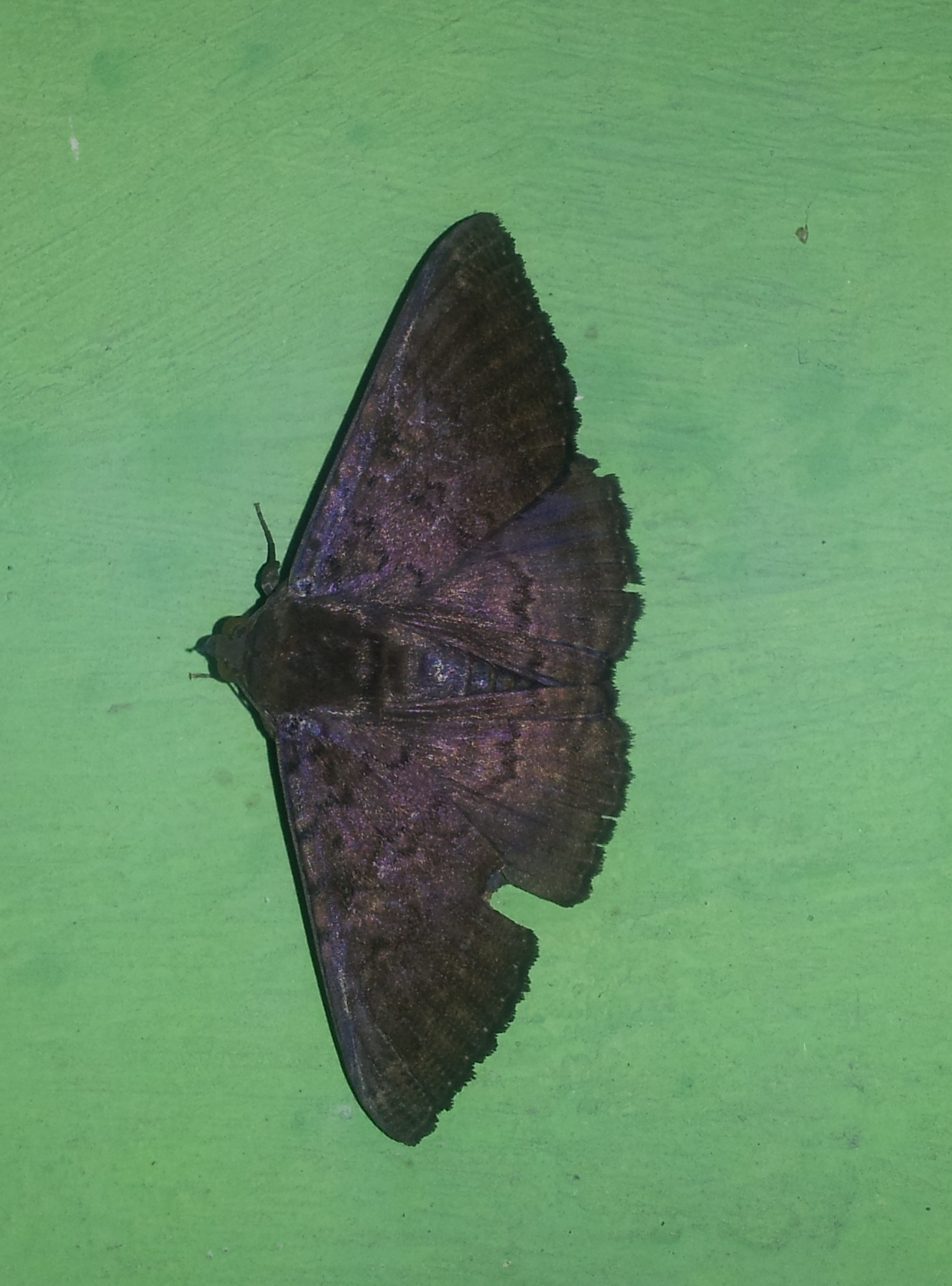
Speiredonia mutabilis

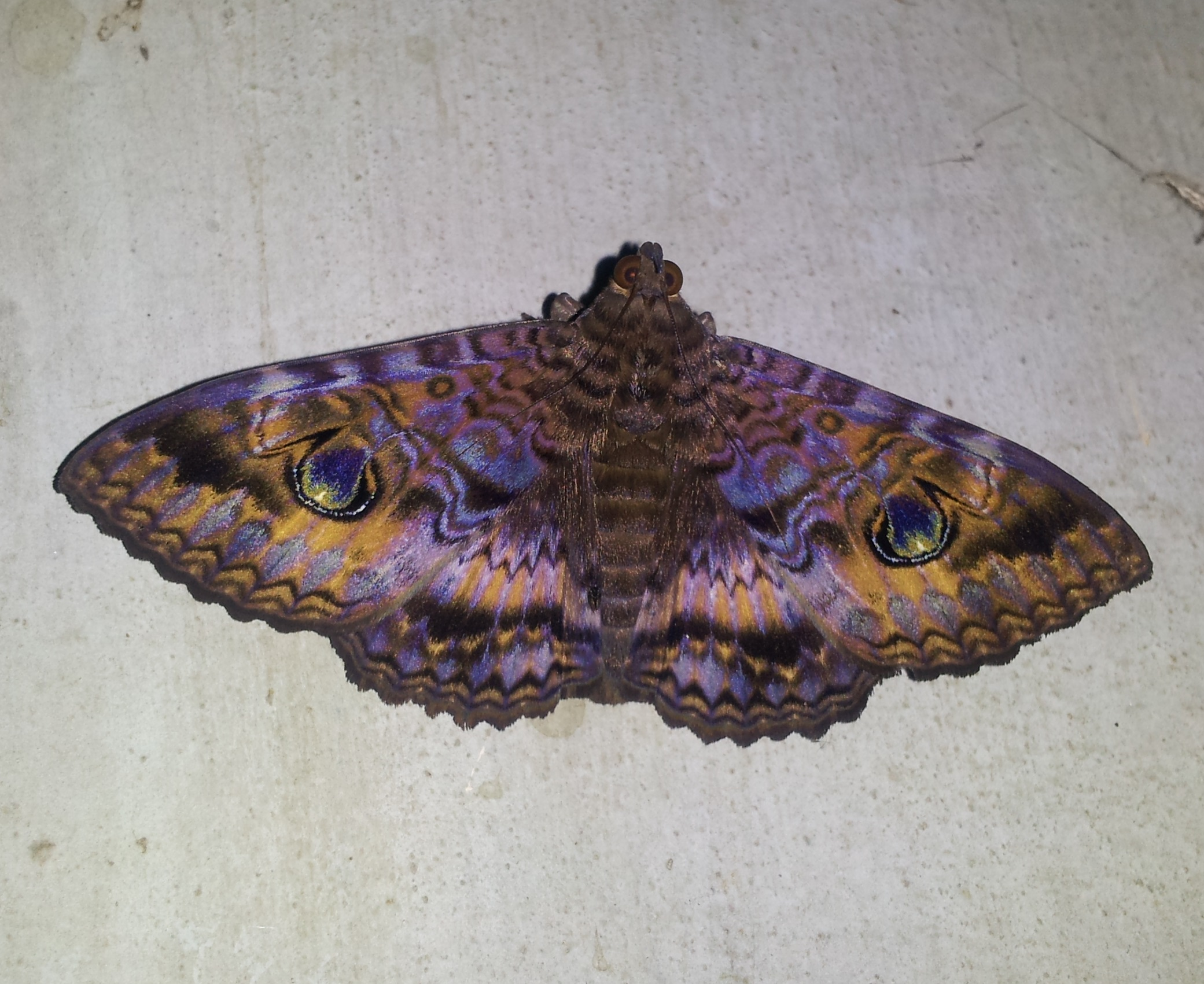
Speiredonia obscura

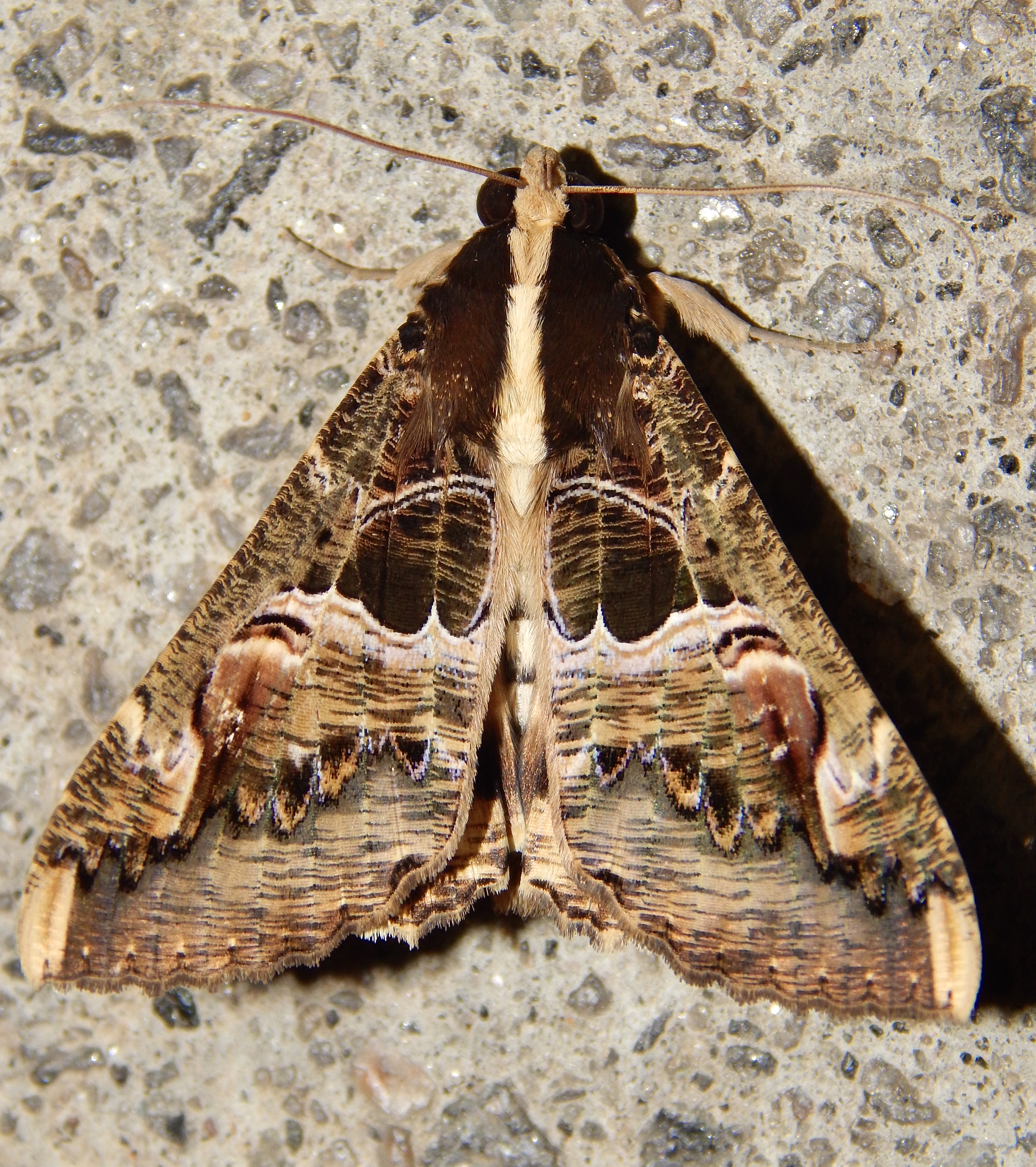
Sphingomoroha chlorea

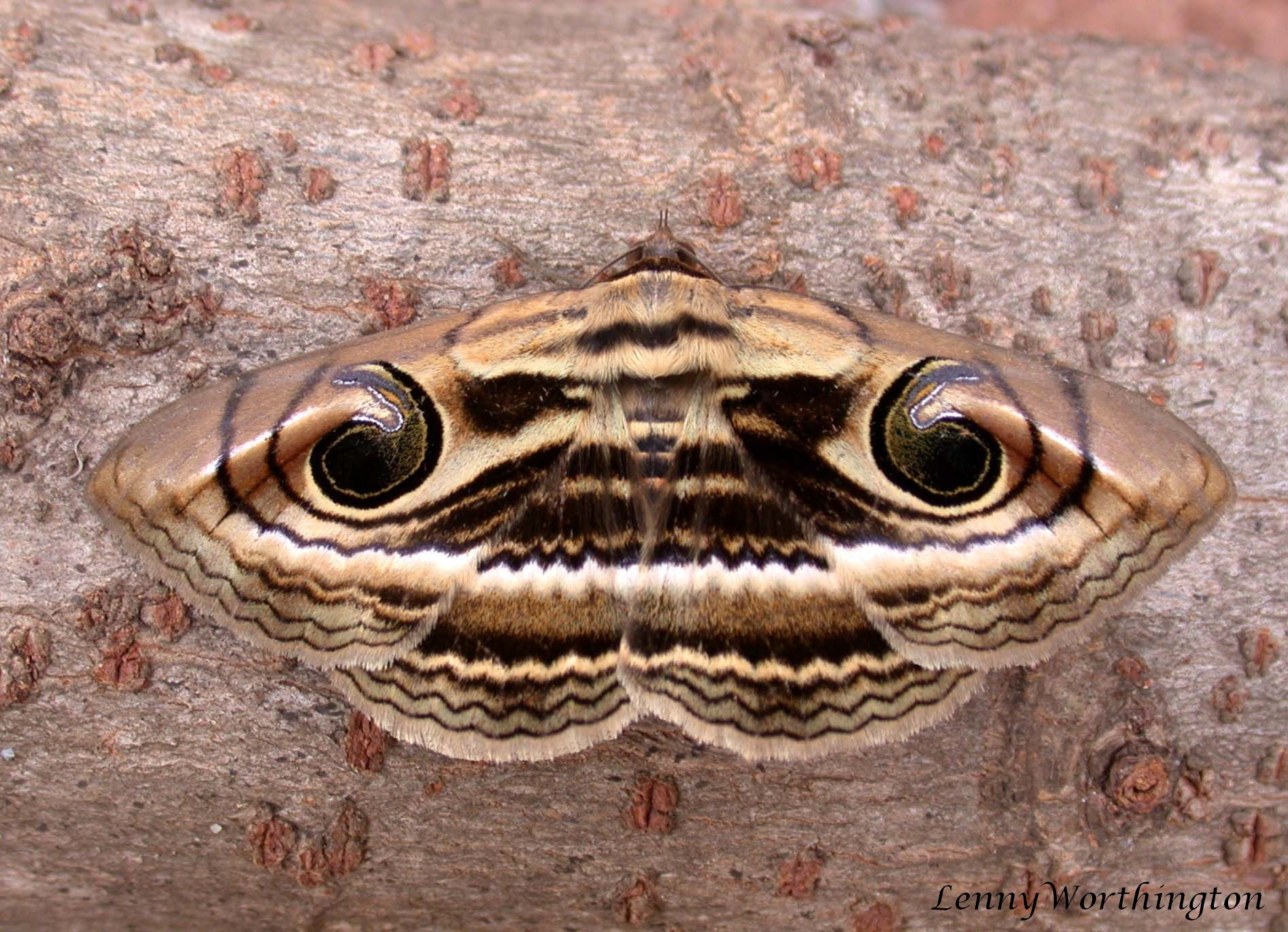
Spirama helicina

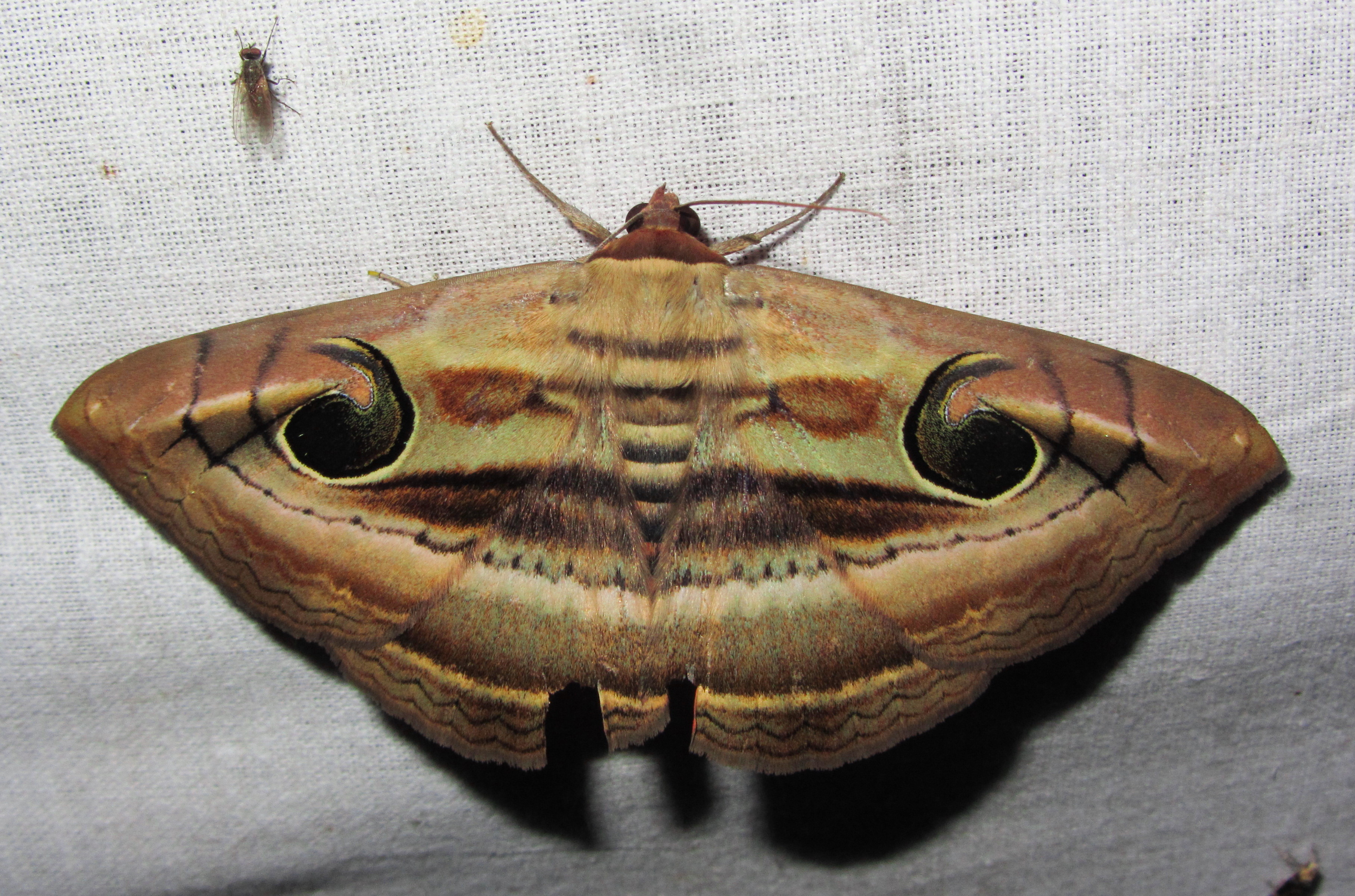
Spirama indentata

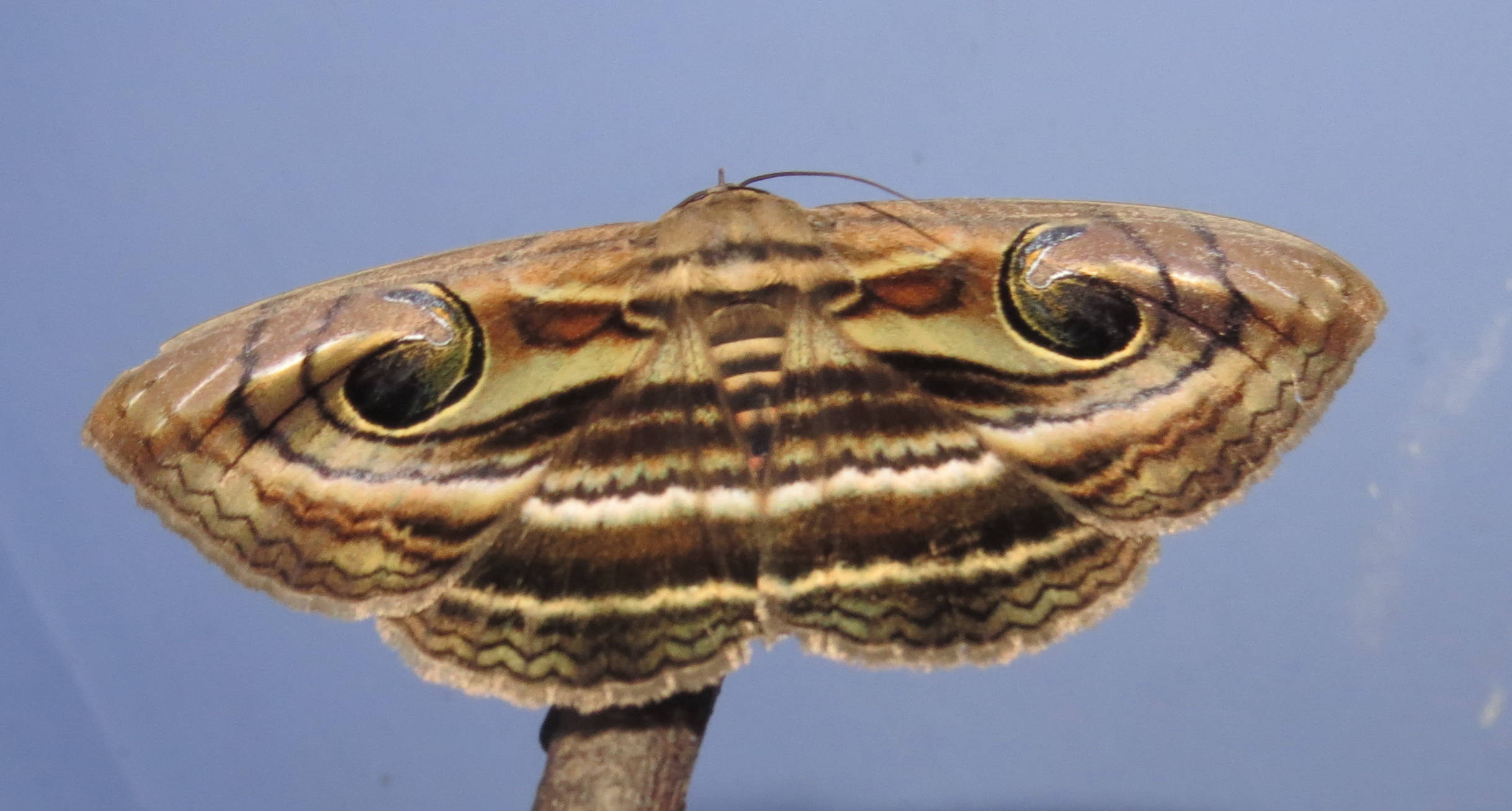
Spirama retorta

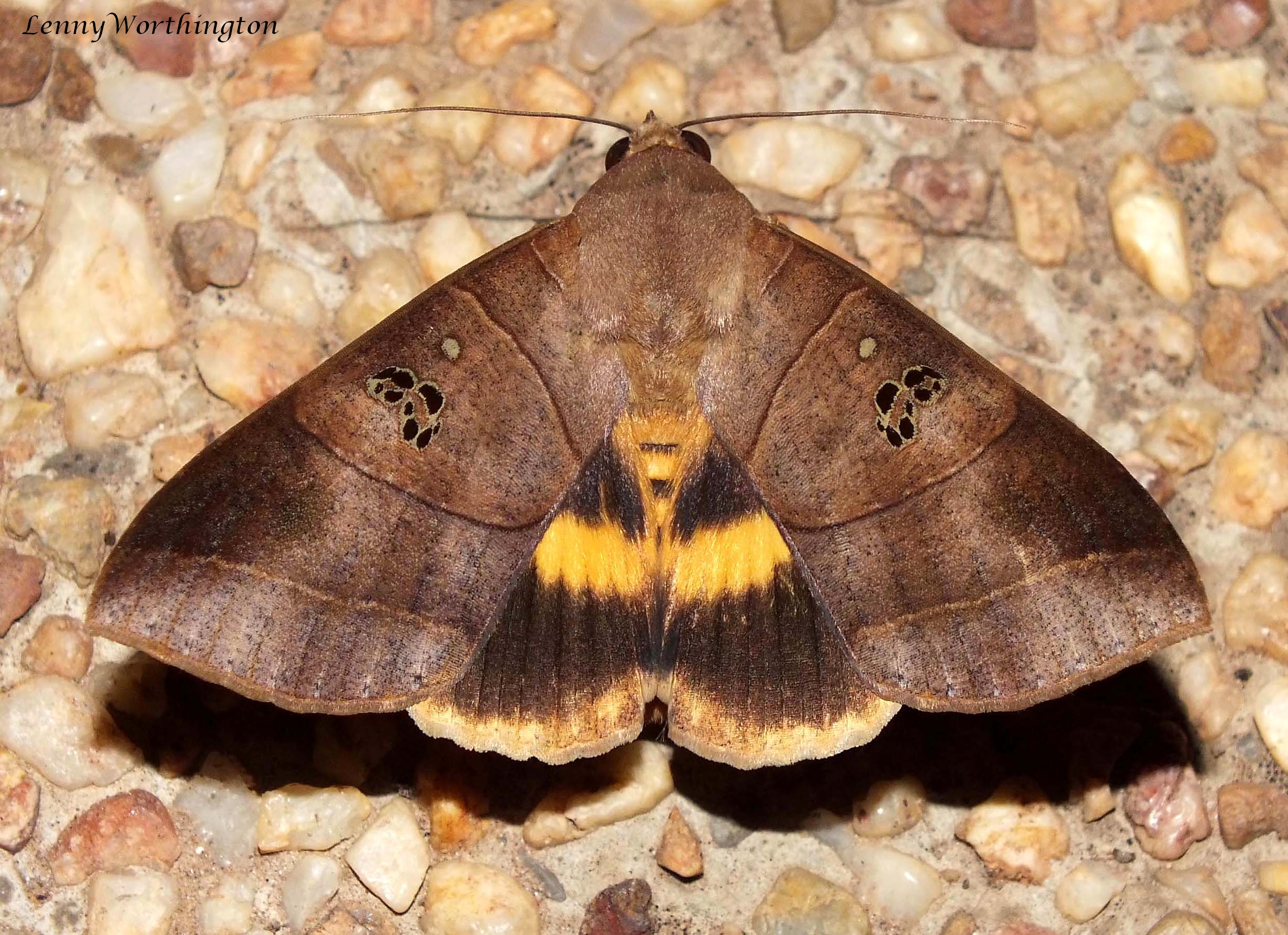
Thyas coronata

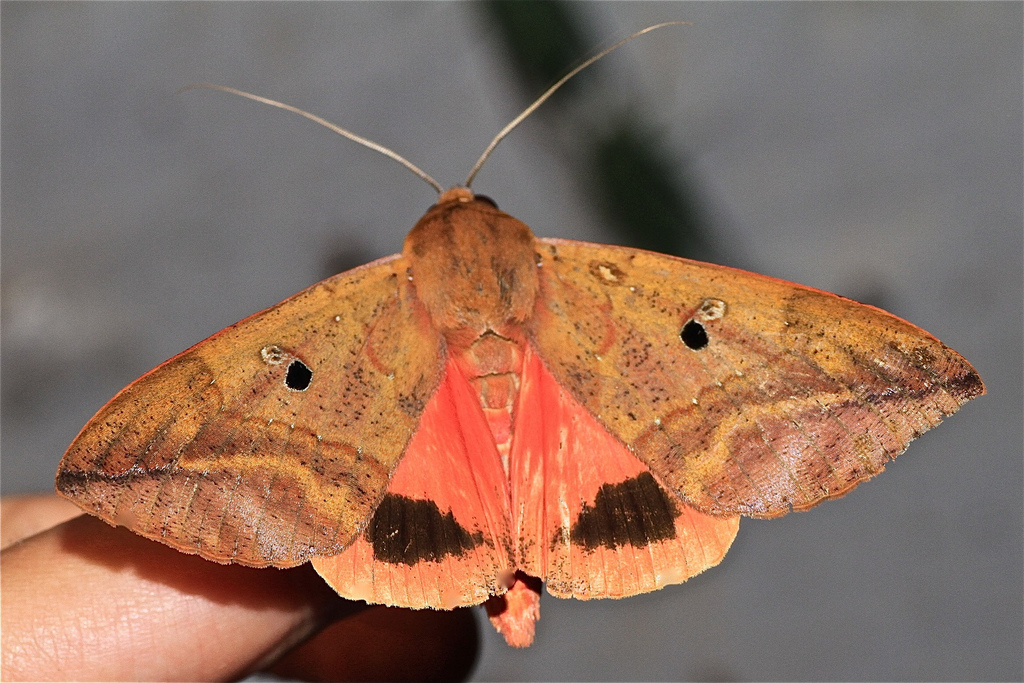
Thyas honesta

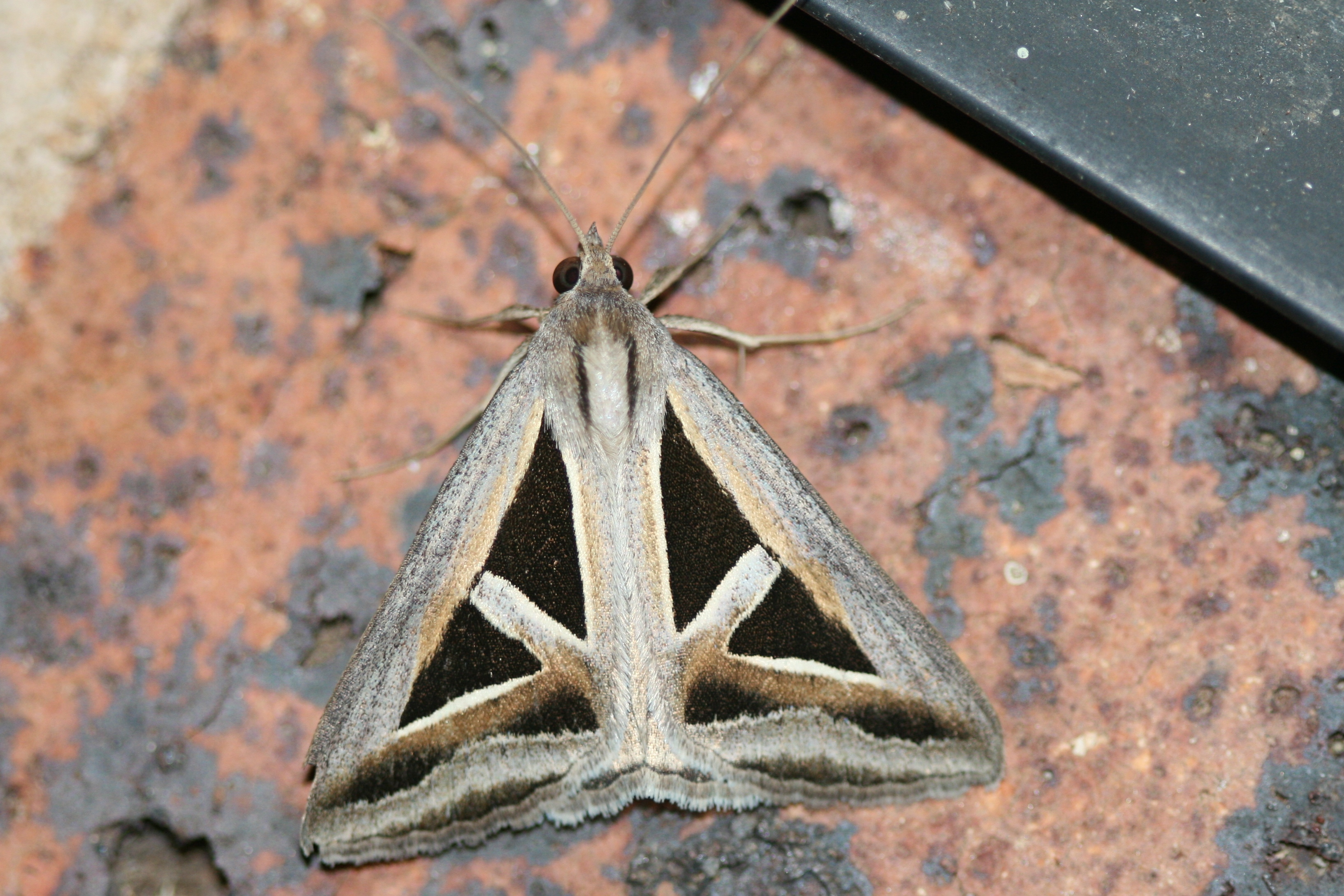
Trigonodes hyppasia

==== Herminiinae - litter moths ====
- Adrapsa ablualis Walker, [1859]
- Adrapsa despecta (Walker, 1865)
- Adrapsa geometroides (Walker, [1858])
- Adrapsa scopigera (Moore, [1885])
- Bocana manifestalis Walker, 1858
- Hadennia jutalis (Walker, [1859])
- Hadennia mysalis (Walker, [1859])
- Hipoepa biasalis (Walker, [1859])
- Hipoepa fractalis (Guenée, 1854)
- Hydrillodes abavalis (Walker, [1859])
- Hydrillodes gravatalis (Walker, [1859])
- Hydrillodes lentalis Guenée, 1854
- Hydrillodes morosa (Butler, 1879)
- Latiphea berresoides (Hampson, 1893)
- Lysimelia lysimeloides (Hampson, 1893)
- Mixomelia relata (Hampson, 1891)
- Nodaria cingala Moore, 1885
- Progonia kurosawai Owada, 1987
- Progonia oileusalis (Walker, 1859)
- Simplicia bimarginata (Walker, [1863])
- Simplicia butesalis Walker, [1859]
- Simplicia cornicalis (Walker, [1859])
- Simplicia mistacalis (Guenée, 1854)
- Sinarella discisigna (Moore, 1883)
- Zanclognatha minoralis J. B. Smith, 1895

==== Hypeninae - snout moths ====
- Acidon nigribasis (Hampson, 1895)
- Anoratha paritalis (Walker, 1858 [1859])
- Arrade erebusalis Walker, 1863
- Artigisa nigrosignata Walker, 1864
- Bertula abjudicalis (Walker, 1859)
- Britha biguttata Walker, [1866]
- Catada vagalis Walker, 1859
- Dichromia cognata (Moore, [1885])
- Dichromia indicatalis (Walker, [1859])
- Dichromia occatus (Moore, 1882)
- Dichromia orosia Cramer, 1780
- Dichromia pullata Moore, 1885
- Dichromia thermesialis (Walker, [1866])
- Harita rectilinea Moore, 1882
- Hypena abyssinialis Guenée, 1854
- Hypena assimilis Hampson, 1891
- Hypena colombana Moore, [1885]
- Hypena conscitalis (Walker, 1866)
- Hypena cyanea (Hampson, 1893)
- Hypena extensa Walker, 1866
- Hypena griseapex Hampson, 1891
- Hypena iconicalis Walker, 1859
- Hypena jocosalis Walker, 1859
- Hypena labatalis Walker, 1859
- Hypena laceratalis Walker, 1859
- Hypena lignealis Walker, 1866
- Hypena mandatalis Walker, 1859
- Hypena molpusalis Walker, 1859
- Hypena obacerralis Walker, 1859
- Hypena obfuscalis Hampson, 1893
- Hypena quaesitalis Walker, [1859]
- Hypena varialis Walker, 1866
- Hypena vestita Moore, 1885
- Hypertrocta posticalis Walker, [1866]
- Naarda atrirena (Hampson, 1912)
- Naarda gigaloba Tóth & Ronkay, 2015
- Naarda huettleri Tóth & Ronkay, 2015
- Naarda glauculalis (Hampson, 1893)
- Naarda ineffectalis Walker, 1859
- Naarda leptosigna Tóth & Ronkay, 2015
- Naarda umbria Hampson, 1902
- Rivula aequalis Moore, 1883 - syn. R. biatomea
- Rivula albistriga (Hampson, 1893)
- Rivula basalis Hampson, 1891
- Rivula bioculalis Moore, 1877
- Rivula curvifera (Walker, 1862)
- Sarobela litterata (Pagenstecher, 1888)
- Stenhypena adustalis (Hampson, 1893)

==== Hypenodinae ====
- Anachrostis nigripuncta Hampson, 1893
- Luceria novatusalis Walker, 1859
- Schrankia croceipicta (Hampson, 1893)

==== Lymantriinae - tussock moths ====
- Arctornis cygna (Moore, 1877)
- Arctornis submarginata (Walker, 1855)
- Arctornis subvitrea (Walker, 1865)
- Arna apicalis Walker, 1865
- Aroa major Walker, [1893]
- Aroa maxima Walker, 1893
- Aroa plana Walker, 1855
- Aroa sienna Hampson, 1891
- Aroa subnotata Walker, 1855
- Artaxa angulata (Matsumura, 1927))
- Artaxa digramma (Boisduval, 1844)
- Artaxa guttata Walker, 1855
- Artaxa vitellina (Kollar, 1848)
- Bembina apicalis Walker, 1865
- Calliteara horsfieldii (Saunders, 1851)
- Carriola fenestrata (Hampson, [1893])
- Casama vilis Walker, 1865
- Cispia alba Moore, 1879
- Cispia punctifascia Walker, 1855
- Dasychira mendosa (Hübner, 1823)
- Dasychira moerens Felder, 1894
- Dasychira thwaitesi Moore, 1883
- Euproctis bimaculata Walker, 1855
- Euproctis cervina (Moore, 1879)
- Euproctis flavinata Walker, 1865
- Euproctis fraterna Moore, 1883
- Euproctis fulvipuncta Hampson, [1893]
- Euproctis lunata Walker, 1855
- Euproctis latifascia Walker, 1855
- Euproctis rhoda Swinhoe, 1891
- Euproctis semisignata Walker, 1865
- Euproctis similis (Fuessly, 1775)
- Euproctis varians (Walker, 1855)
- Laelia cardinalis Hampson, [1893]
- Laelia exclamationis (Kollar, 1848)
- Laelia fasciata (Moore, [1883])
- Laelia suffusa (Walker, 1855)
- Laelia testacea (Moore, 1879)
- Lacida costalis Walker, 1855
- Leucoma cryptadia Collenette, 1938
- Lymantria ampla (Walker, 1855)
- Lymantria detersa Walker, 1865
- Lymantria fuliginosa Moore, 1883
- Lymantria grandis (Walker, 1855)
- Lymantria incerta Walker, 1855
- Lymantria marginata Walker, 1855
- Lymantria serva Walker, 1855
- Lymantria subrosea Swinhoe, 1903
- Lymantria todara Moore, 1879
- Nygmia icilia Stoll, 1790
- Nygmia xanthomela (Walker, 1862)
- Orgyia postica (Walker, 1855)
- Orgyia viridescens Walker, 1855
- Perina nuda Fabricius 1787
- Psalis pennatula Fabricius, 1793
- Somena scintillans (Walker, 1856)
- Sphrageidus xanthorrhoea Kollar, 1848
- Themaca comparata (Walker, 1865) = Artaxa comparata

==== Pangraptinae ====
- Episparis varialis (Walker, 1858)

==== Scoliopteryginae ====
- Anomis combinans (Walker, 1858)
- Anomis figlina Butler, 1889
- Anomis fulvida Guenée, 1852
- Anomis guttanivis (Walker, 1858) - often considered to be a synonym of Anomis fulvida
- Anomis involuta (Walker, 1858)
- Anomis mesogona (Walker, 1858)
- Anomis nigritarsis (Walker, 1858)
- Anomis privata (Walker, 1865)
- Anomis sabulifera Guenée, 1852
- Dinumma placens Walker, 1858
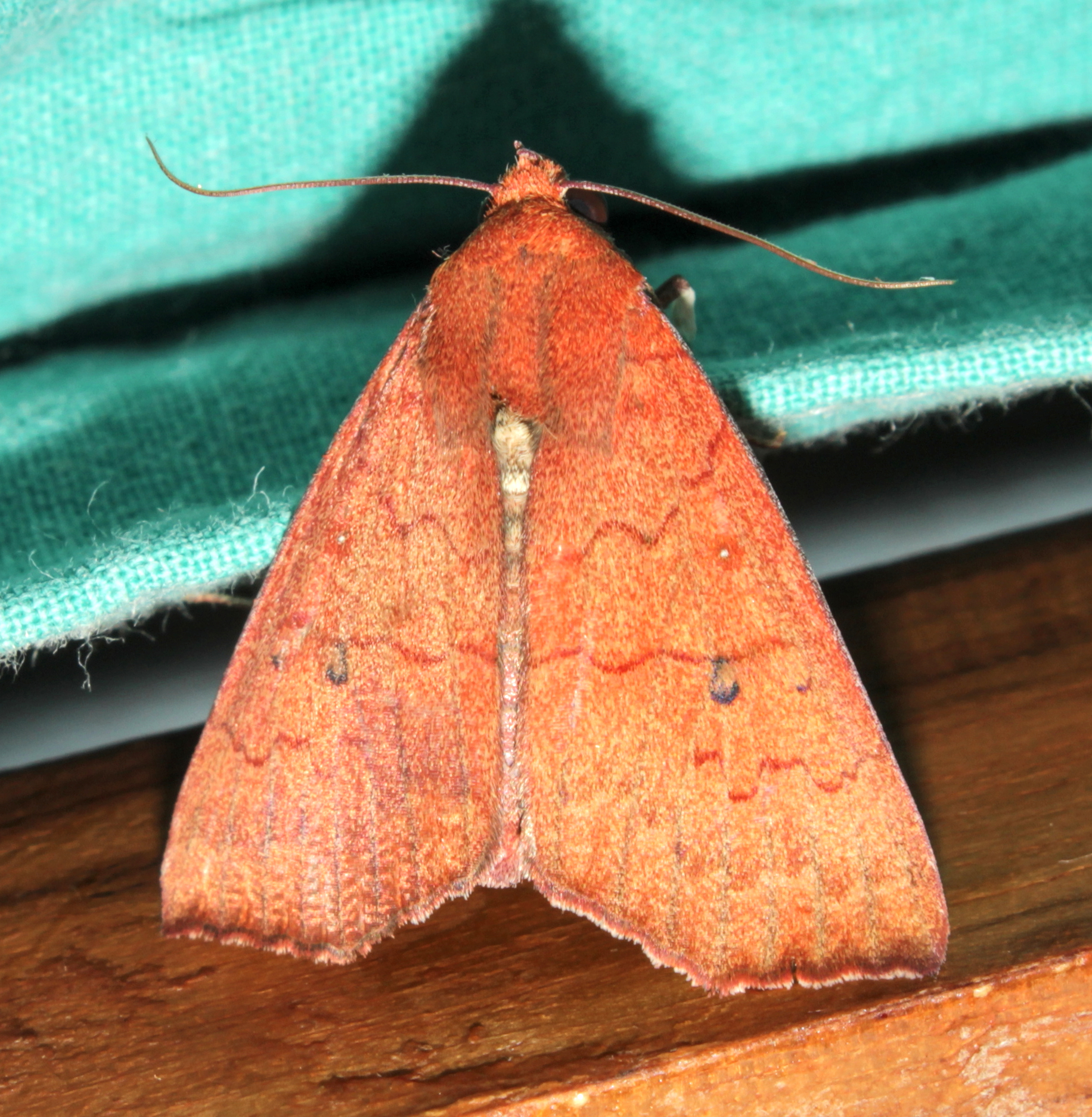
Anomis fulvida

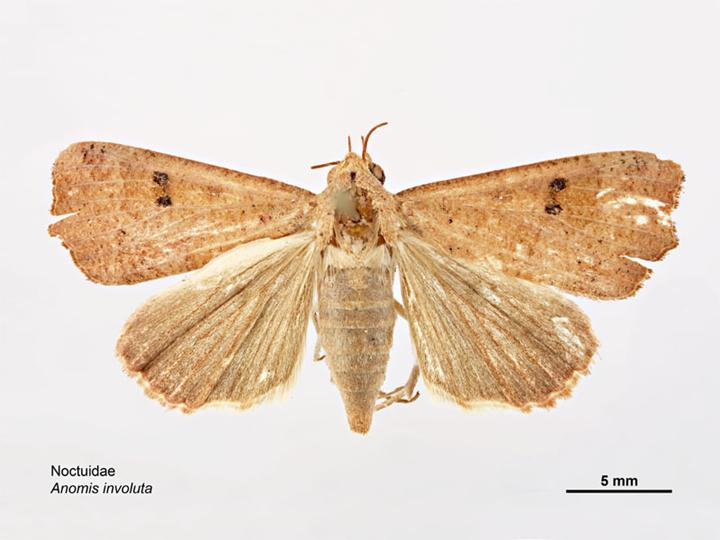
Anomis involuta

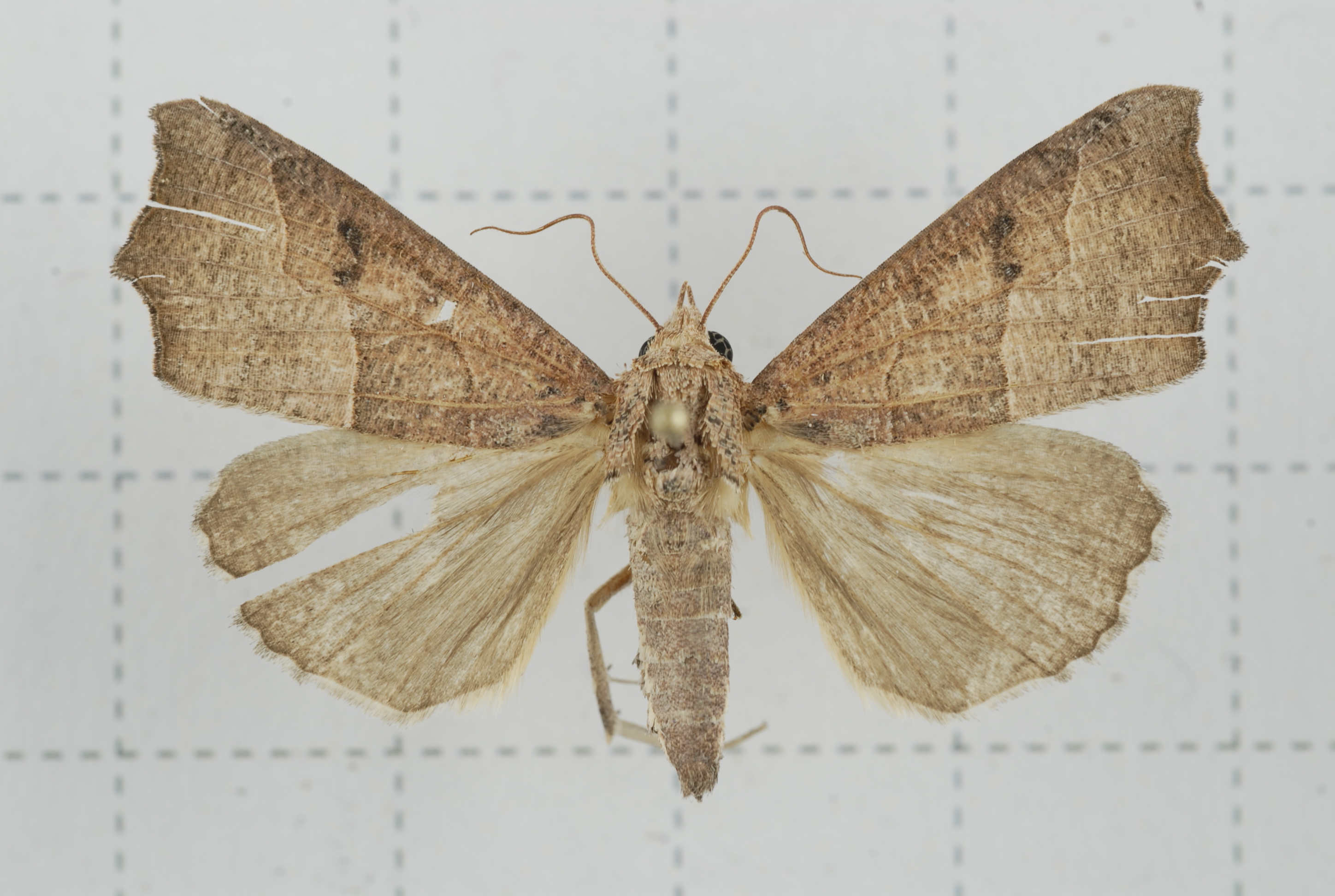
Anomis mesogona

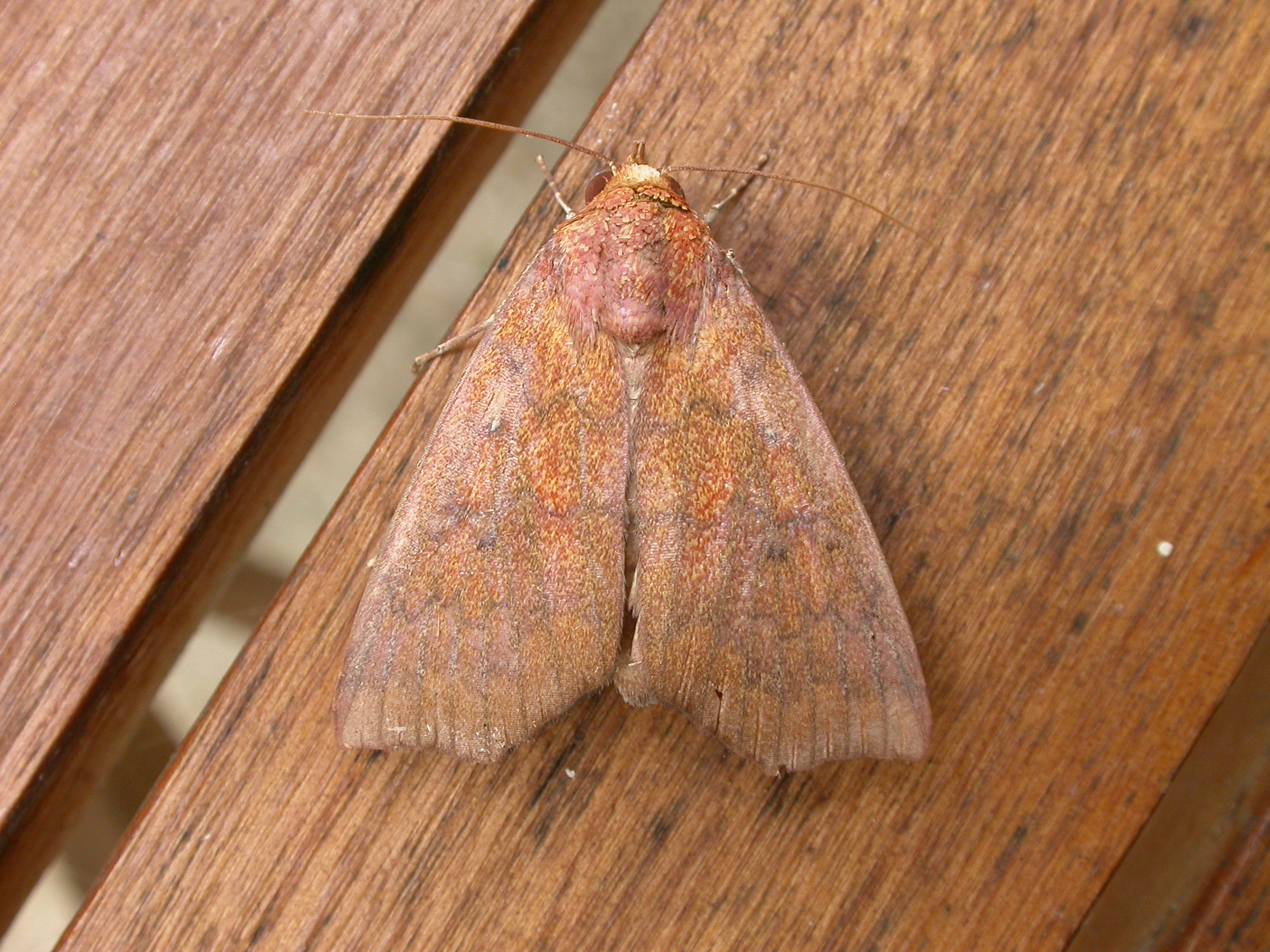
Anomis nigritarsis

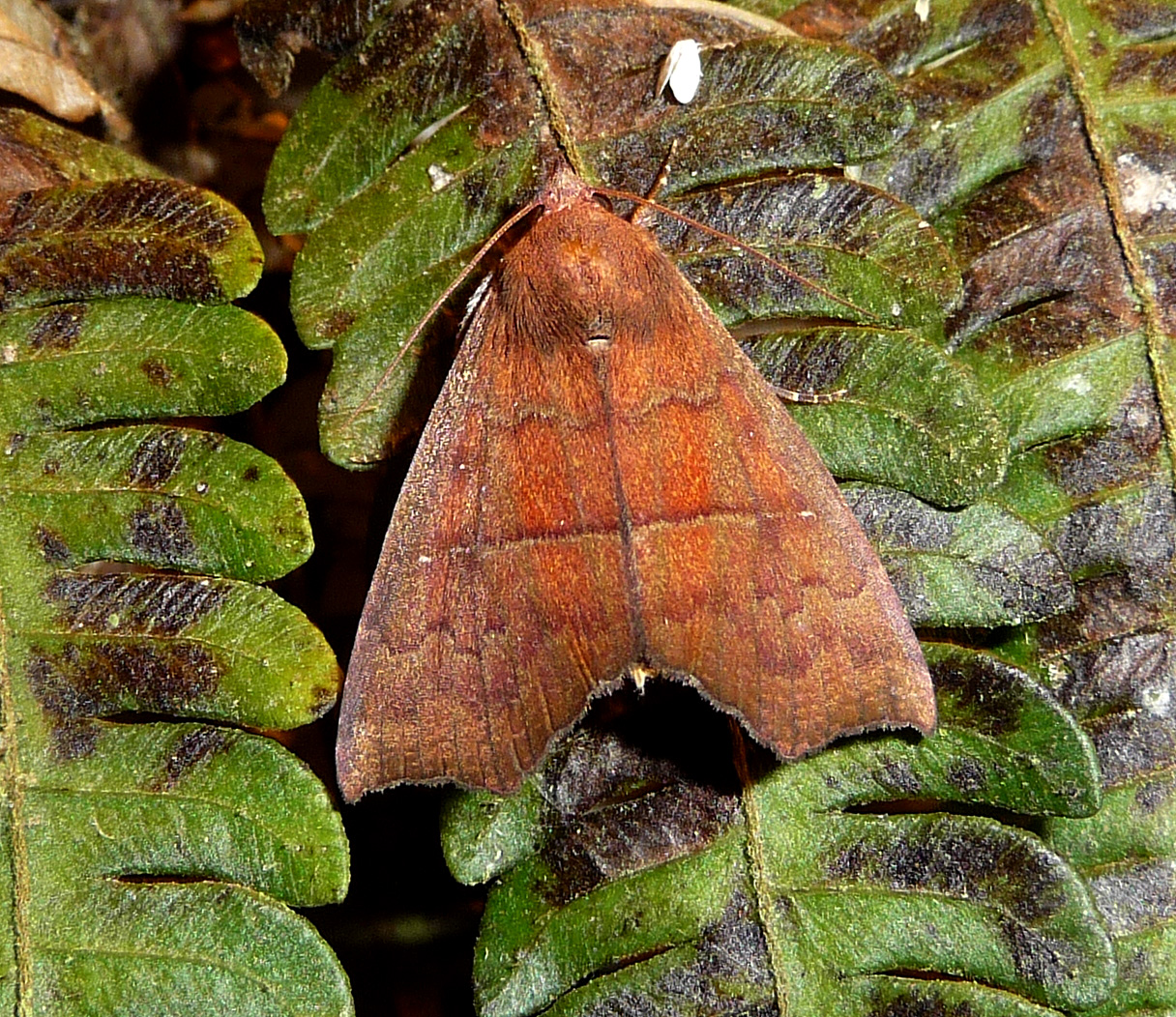
Anomis privata

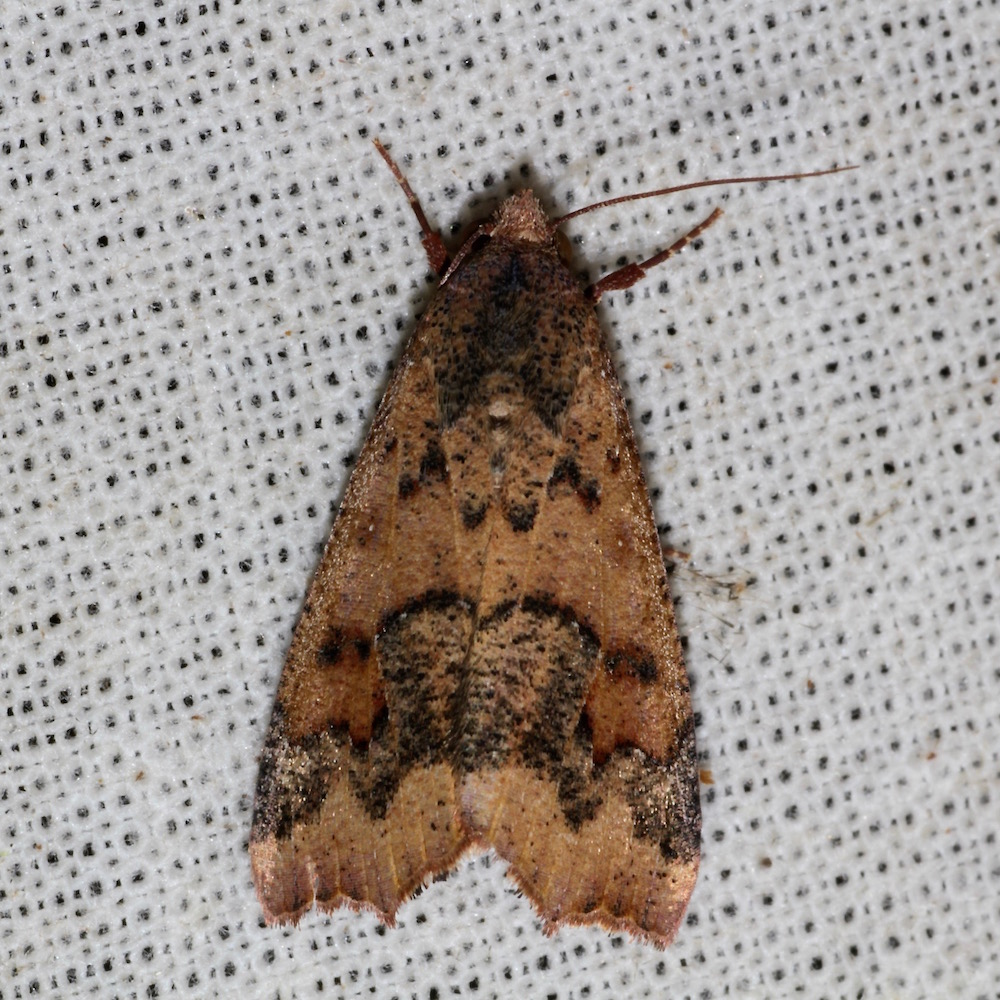
Anomis sabulifera

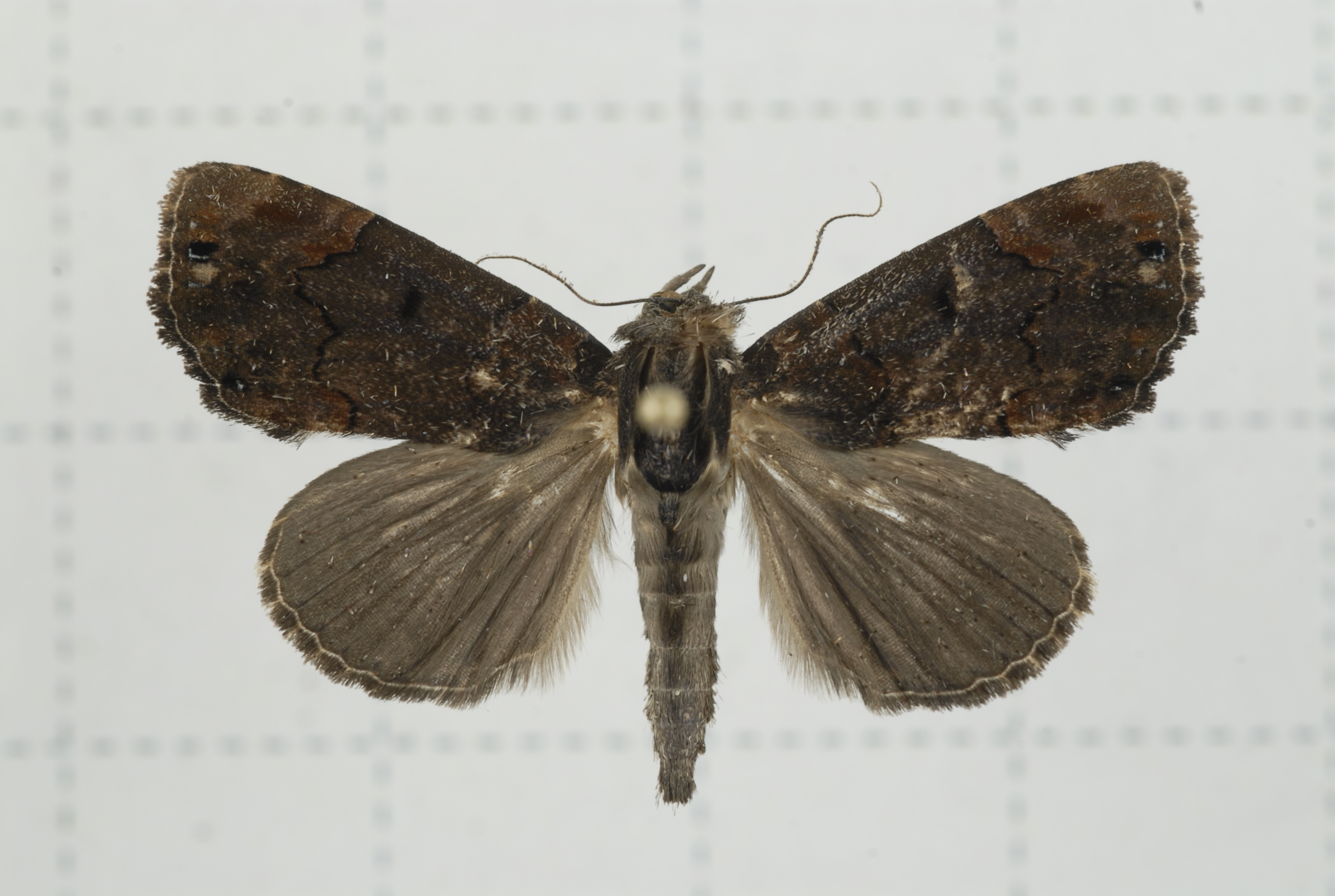
Dinumma placens

==== Tinoliinae ====
- Tinolius eburneigutta Walker, 1855
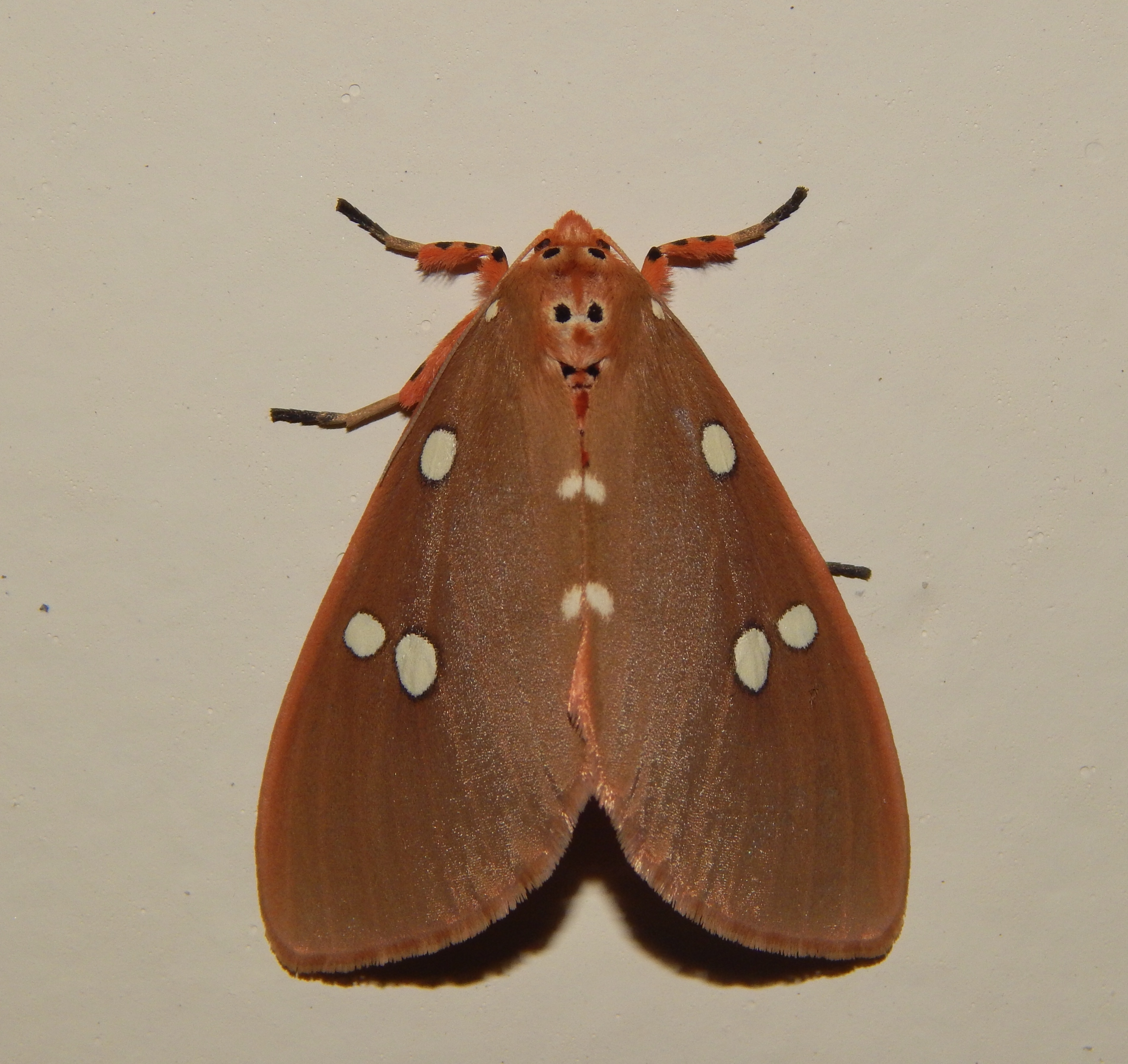
Tinolius eburneigutta

=== Ethmiidae - ethmiid moths ===
- Ethmia assamensis (Butler, 1879)

=== Eupterotidae - giant lappet moths ===
- Apona shevaroyensis Moore, 1884
- Eupterote citheronia Bryk, 1944
- Eupterote diffusa Walker, 1865
- Eupterote fabia (Cramer, 1779)
- Eupterote geminata (Walker, 1855)
- Eupterote mollifera Walker, 1865
- Eupterote placida (Moore, 1883)
- Eupterote plumipes (Walker, 1855)
- Eupterote subcurvifera (Walker, 1865)
- Eupterote undata Blanchard, [1844]
- Eupterote vialis (Moore, [1883])
- Ganisa postica Walker, 1855
- Pandala dolosa Walker, 1855
- Patulognatha murina (Moore, 1877)
- Patulognatha nigriceps (Hampson, 1893)
- Patulognatha tamilensis (Giusti, Naumann & Nässig, 2024)
- Patulognatha zoeae (Giusti, Naumann & Nässig, 2024)
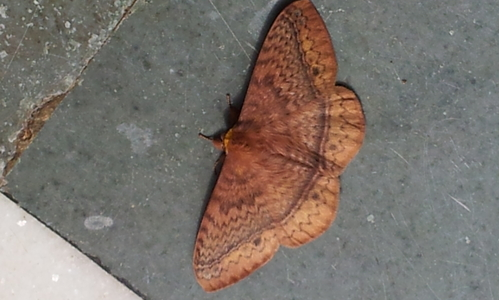
Eupterote undata

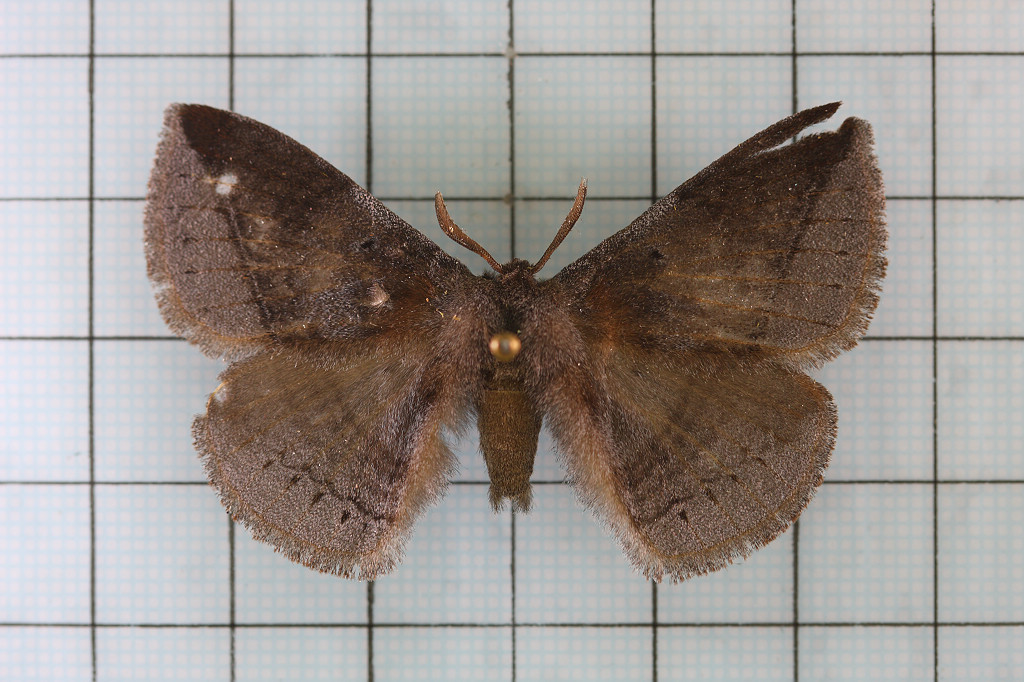
Ganisa postica

=== Gelechiidae - twirler moths ===
- Acleris sagmatias (Meyrick, 1905)
- Anarsia phortica Meyrick, 1913
- Aphanostola sparsipalpis Meyrick, 1931
- Athrips studiosa (Meyrick, 1905)
- Brachmia antichroa Meyrick, 1918
- Brachmia episticta (Meyrick, 1905)
- Chlorolychnis agnatella (Walker, 1864)
- Dactylethrella candida (Stainton, 1859)
- Dactylethrella globulata (Meyrick, 1910)
- Dactylethrella incondita (Meyrick, 1913)
- Deltoplastis byssina (Meyrick, 1910)
- Deltoplastis clerodotis (Meyrick, 1910)
- Deltoplastis cognata C. S. Wu & Park, 1998
- Deltoplastis commatopa Meyrick, 1932
- Deltoplastis cremnaspis (Meyrick, 1905)
- Deltoplastis figurata (Meyrick, 1910)
- Deltoplastis figurodigita C. S. Wu & Park, 1998
- Deltoplastis lamellospina C. S. Wu & Park, 1998
- Deltoplastis propensa (Meyrick, 1910)
- Deltoplastis straminicornis (Meyrick, 1910)
- Dichomeris acrochlora (Meyrick, 1905)
- Dichomeris deltaspis (Meyrick, 1905)
- Epichostis metrodelta (Meyrick, 1905)
- Epimimastis escharitis Meyrick, 1916
- Ficulea blandulella Walker, 1864
- Harmatitis sphecopa Meyrick, 1910
- Helcystogramma amethystium (Meyrick, 1906)
- Helcystogramma anthistis (Meyrick, 1929)
- Helcystogramma arotraeum Meyrick, 1884
- Helcystogramma aruritis (Meyrick, 1911)
- Helcystogramma epicentra (Meyrick, 1911)
- Helcystogramma hapalyntis (Meyrick, 1911)
- Helcystogramma hibisci (Stainton, 1859)
- Helcystogramma hoplophorum Meyrick, 1916
- Helcystogramma infibulatum Meyrick, 1916
- Helcystogramma immeritella (Walker, 1864)
- Helcystogramma leucoplectum (Meyrick, 1911)
- Helcystogramma lochistis (Meyrick, 1911)
- Helcystogramma philomusum (Meyrick, 1918)
- Helcystogramma phryganitis (Meyrick, 1911)
- Helcystogramma xerastis (Meyrick, 1905)
- Hypatima spathota (Meyrick, 1913)
- Idiophantis anisosticta Meyrick, 1916
- Idiophantis chiridota Meyrick, 1914
- Idiophantis discura Meyrick, 1907
- Idiophantis paraptila Meyrick, 1916
- Idiophantis soreuta Meyrick, 1906
- Ischnodoris chlorosperma Meyrick, 1929
- Ischnodoris sigalota Meyrick, 1911
- Latrologa aoropis Meyrick, 1918
- Mesophleps ioloncha (Meyrick, 1905)
- Narthecoceros logica Meyrick, 1910
- Narthecoceros platyconta (Meyrick, 1905)
- Narthecoceros xylodes Meyrick, 1906
- Organitis characopa Meyrick, 1906
- Organitis lubrica (Meyrick, 1910)
- Palintropa hippica Meyrick, 1913
- Pectinophora gossypiella (Saunders, 1844)
- Pharangitis spathias Meyrick, 1905
- Proadamas indefessa Meyrick, 1929
- Psorosticha zizyphi (Stainton, 1859)
- Scrobipalpa heliopa Lower, 1900
- Sitotroga cerealella Olivier, 1789
- Stenolechia orsicoma (Meyrick, 1918)
- Stenolechia trichaspis (Meyrick, 1918)
- Thiotricha orthiastis Meyrick, 1905
- Trichembola fuscata Meyrick, 1918
- Tricyanaula aurantiaca (Walsingham, 1887)

=== Geometridae - geometer moths ===
- Abraxas leucostola Hampson, 1893
- Abraxas sordida Hampson, 1893
- Achrosis rondelaria (Fabricius, 1775)
- Achrosis serpentinaria (Walker, 1866)
- Acidaliastis micra Hampson, 1896
- Agathia conviridaria Hübner 1823
- Agathia hemithearia Guenée, 1857
- Agathia laetata (Fabricius, 1794)
- Agathia magnifica Moore, 1879
- Amblychia angeronaria Guenée, 1857
- Amblychia hymenaria (Guenée, 1857)
- Aplochlora vivilaca (Walker, 1861)
- Aporandria specularia (Guenée, 1857)
- Argyrocosma inductaria (Guenée, 1857)
- Astygisa vexillaria (Guenée, 1857) - sometimes classified as Petelia vexillaria
- Axinoptera subcostalis Hampson, 1893
- Berta chrysolineata Walker, [1863]
- Biston suppressaria (Guenée, 1858)
- Boarmia ceylonaria Nietner, 1861
- Bosara emarginaria (Hampson, 1893)
- Borbacha pardaria (Guenée, 1857)
- Bylazora infumata Felder, 1874
- Cacochloris uvidula Swinhoe, 1885
- Calletaera postvittata (Walker, 1861)
- Calluga costalis Moore, 1887
- Carbia pulchrilinea (Walker, 1866)
- Catoria sublavaria (Guenée, 1857)
- Celenna festivaria (Fabricius, 1794)
- Chiasmia emersaria (Walker, 1861)
- Chiasmia nora (Walker, 1861)
- Chiasmia normata (Walker, 1861)
- Chiasmia sufflata (Guenée, 1858)
- Chlorochaeta integranota Hampson, 1893
- Chloroclystis emarginaria Hampson, 1893
- Chloroclystis filicata Swinhoe, 1892
- Chorodna strixaria (Guenée, 1857)
- Chrysocraspeda abhadraca (Walker, 1861)
- Chrysocraspeda faganaria Guenée, 1858
- Chrysocraspeda olearia (Guenée, [1858])
- Chrysocraspeda tristicula Swinhoe, 1886
- Cleora alienaria (Walker, 1860)
- Cleora injectaria (Walker, 1860)
- Cleora taprobana D. S. Fletcher, 1953
- Collix ghosha Walker, 1862
- Collix hypospilata Guenée, 1857
- Collix rufipalpis (Hampson, 1907)
- Comibaena cassidara (Guenée, 1857)
- Comostola chlorargyra (Walker, 1861)
- Comostola laesaria (Walker, 1861)
- Comostola pyrrhogona (Walker, 1866)
- Comostola subtiliaria (Bremer, 1864)
- Conolophia nigripuncta (Hampson, 1891)
- Corymica specularia (Moore, [1868])
- Cusiala raptaria Walker, 1860
- Cusuma flavifusa Hampson, 1893
- Cusuma vilis Walker, 1854
- Cyclophora nebulosata (Walker, 1863)
- Cyclophora obstataria (Walker, 1861)
- Cyclothea disjuncta Walker, 1861
- Dasyboarmia subpilosa (Warren, 1894)
- Derambila lumenaria (Geyer, 1832)
- Derambila saponaria (Guenée, 1857)
- Dysphania palmyra Stoll, 1790
- Dysphania prunicolor Moore, 1879
- Ecliptopera dissecta (Moore, [1887])
- Ecliptopera muscicolor Swinhoe 1894
- Ecliptopera subnubila L.B Prout, 1940
- Ectropis bhurmitra (Walker, 1860)
- Entomopteryx combusta (Warren, 1893)
- Eois dissimilis (Moore, 1887)
- Eois grataria (Walker, 1861)
- Eois lunulosa (Moore, [1887])
- Epipristis minimaria (Guenée, [1858])
- Eriopithex recensitaria (Walker, 1862)
- Eucrostes disparata Walker, 1861
- Eucyclodes divapala (Walker, 1861)
- Eucyclodes gavissima (Walker, 1861)
- Eucyclodes semialba (Walker, 1861)
- Eumelea ludovicata (Stoll, [1781])
- Eumelea rosalia (Stoll, [1781])
- Eupithecia albifurva Hampson, 1907
- Eupithecia costalis (Walker, 1863)
- Eupithecia melanolopha Swinhoe, 1895
- Eupithecia niveivena Prout, 1926
- Eupithecia singhalensis Mironov & Galsworthy, 2010
- Fascellina chromataria Walker, 1860
- Glaucoclystis immixtaria (Walker, 1862)
- Glaucoclystis polyclealis (Walker, 1859)
- Gnamptopteryx perficita Walker, 1858
- Gonanticlea occlusata Felder, 1875
- Gonodontis clelia Cramer, 1780
- Gymnoscelis admixtaria (Walker, 1862)
- Gymnoscelis deleta (Hampson, 1891)
- Gymnoscelis ectochloros (Hampson, 1891)
- Gymnoscelis imparatalis (Walker, 1865)
- Gymnoscelis roseifascia (Hampson, 1893)
- Gymnoscelis tibialis (Moore, 1887)
- Gymnoscelis tristrigosa (Butler, 1880)
- Hemithea marina (Butler, 1878)
- Herochroma baibarana (Matsumura, 1931)
- Herochroma orientalis (Holloway, 1982)
- Herochroma subspoliata (Prout, 1916)
- Heterostegane aurantiaca (Warren, 1894)
- Heterostegane rectifascia (Hampson)
- Hyperythra lutea Stoll, 1781
- Hypochrosis chlorozonaria Walker, 1860
- Hypochrosis hyadaria Guenée, 1857
- Hypomecis adamata (Felder & Rogenhofer, 1875)
- Hypomecis separata (Walker, 1863)
- Hypomecis transcissa (Walker, 1860)
- Hyposidra talaca (Walker, 1860)
- Idaea actiosaria (Walker, 1861)
- Idaea gemmaria (Hampson, 1896)
- Idaea lineata Hampson, 1893
- Idaea marcidaria (Walker, 1861)
- Idaea micra (Hampson, 1893)
- Idaea mutanda Warren, 1888
- Idaea phoenicoglauca (Hampson, 1907)
- Idaea purpurea (Warren, 1897) - sometimes as Lophophleps purpurea
- Idaea semisericea (Warren, 1897)
- Idiochlora caudularia Guenée, 1857
- Isturgia catalaunaria (Guenée, 1858)
- Isturgia pulinda (Walker, 1860)
- Lomographa inamata (Walker, 1860)
- Lophophleps phoenicoptera (Hampson, 1896)
- Loxofidonia cingala (Moore, [1887])
- Luxiaria phyllosaria (Walker, 1860)
- Maxates acutissima (Walker, 1861)
- Maxates coelataria Walker, 1861
- Maxates dissimulata (Walker, 1861)
- Mesotrophe intortaria (Guenée 1858)
- Mixocera parvulata (Walker, [1863])
- Microloxia herbaria (Hübner, 1813)
- Mnesiloba dentifascia (Hampson, 1891)
- Mnesiloba intentata (Walker, 1866)
- Nadagara vigaia Walker, 1862
- Naxa textilis Walker, 1856
- Noreia ajaia (Walker, 1859)
- Oenospila flavifusata (Walker, 1861)
- Organopoda carnearia (Walker, 1861)
- Orthocabera obliqua (Hampson, 1893)
- Ophthalmitis caritaria Walker, 1860
- Ophthalmitis herbidaria (Guenée, 1858)
- Ophthalmitis sinensium (Oberthür, 1913)
- Orothalassodes falsaria (Prout, 1912)
- Orothalassodes leucospilota (Moore, [1887])
- Orthonama obstipata (Fabricius, 1794)
- Oxymacaria ceylonica Hampson, 1902
- Ozola microniaria Walker, 1862
- Ozola minor (Moore, 1888)
- Pamphlebia rubrolimbraria (Guenée, 1857)
- Pelagodes spiniseparati Holloway, 1996
- Pelagodes clarifimbria (Prout, 1919)
- Pelagodes furvifimbria (Prout, 1917)
- Perixera absconditaria (Walker, 1862)
- Perixera monetaria (Guenée, [1858])
- Perixera obliviaria (Walker, 1861)
- Perixera obrinaria (Guenée, [1858])
- Petelia immaculata Hampson, 1893
- Petelia medardaria Herrich-Schäffer, 1856
- Plutodes exiguifascia (Hampson, 1895)
- Plutodes transmutata Walker, 1861
- Pomasia psylaria Guenée, 1857
- Polynesia sunandava (Walker, 1861)
- Probithia exclusa (Walker, 1860)
- Probithia obstataria (Walker, 1861)
- Problepsis deliaria Guenée, [1858]
- Pydna metaphsea Walker
- Racotis boarmiaria (Guenée, 1857)
- Rhinoprora palpata (Walker, 1862)
- Ruttelerona cessaria (Walker, 1860)
- Sauris hirudinata Guenée, 1858
- Sauris interruptata Moore, 1887
- Sauris lineosa Moore, 1888
- Sauris nigripalpata Walker, 1862
- Sauris perfasciata Hampson, 1895
- Sauris proboscidaria Walker, 1862
- Scardamia bractearia Walker, 1860
- Scardamia metallaria Guenée, 1858
- Scopula actuaria (Walker, 1861)
- Scopula addictaria (Walker, 1861)
- Scopula adeptaria (Walker, 1861)
- Scopula alstoni Prout, 1919
- Scopula aspilataria (Walker, 1861)
- Scopula costata (Moore, [1887])
- Scopula divisaria (Walker, 1861)
- Scopula emissaria (Walker, 1861)
- Scopula ferruginea (Hampson, 1893)
- Scopula fibulata (Guenée, [1858])
- Scopula intensata (Moore, 1887)
- Scopula modesta (Moore, [1887])
- Scopula nesciaria (Walker, 1861)
- Scopula opicata (Fabricius, 1798)
- Scopula pedilata Felder, 1875
- Scopula pulchellata (Fabricius, 1794)
- Scopula walkeri (Butler, 1883)
- Semiothisa frugaliata Guenée, 1858
- Semiothisa eleonora (Villers, 1789)
- Semiothisa ozararia (Walker, 1860) - sometimes referred as Godonela ozararia
- Semiothisa perfusaria Walker, 1866
- Semiothisa quadraria Moore, 1887
- Somatina omicraria (Fabricius, 1798)
- Somatina purpurascens Moore, [1887]
- Spaniocentra pannosa (Moore 1887)
- Symmacra solidaria (Guenée, 1857)
- Synegia imitaria Walker, 1861
- Thalassodes immissaria Walker, 1861
- Thalassodes quadraria (Guenée, 1857)
- Thalassodes veraria Guenée, 1857 - sometimes as Pelagodes veraria
- Thinopteryx crocoptera Kollar, 1844
- Timandra comptaria Walker, 1862
- Timandra convectaria Walker, 1861
- Traminda aventiaria Guenée, 1857
- Traminda mundissima (Walker, 1861)
- Xanthorhoe molata Felder, 1875
- Zamarada baliata (Felder & Rogenhofer, 1875)
- Zeheba lucidata Walker, 1866
- Ziridava xylinaria Walker, 1863

=== Glyphipterigidae - sedge moths ===
- Glyphipterix antidoxa Meyrick, 1909
- Glyphipterix argyromis Meyrick, 1907
- Glyphipterix ditiorana (Walker, 1863)
- Glyphipterix hemipempta Meyrick, 1909
- Glyphipterix maschalis Meyrick, 1909
- Glyphipterix molybdora Meyrick, 1912
- Glyphipterix orymagdis Meyrick, 1909
- Glyphipterix oxycopis Meyrick, 1918
- Glyphipterix psychopa Meyrick, 1909
- Glyphipterix sclerodes Meyrick, 1909
- Glyphipterix stilata Meyrick, 1912
- Glyphipterix tetrachrysa Meyrick, 1907

=== Gracillariidae - leaf-blotch miner moths ===
- Acrocercops bisinuata Meyrick, 1921
- Acrocercops brochogramma Meyrick, 1914
- Acrocercops castellata Meyrick, 1908
- Acrocercops coffeifoliella (Motschulsky, 1859)
- Acrocercops convoluta Meyrick, 1908
- Acrocercops euthycolona Meyrick, 1931
- Acrocercops geologica Meyrick, 1908
- Acrocercops isodelta Meyrick, 1908
- Acrocercops lyrica Meyrick, 1908
- Acrocercops plocamis Meyrick, 1908
- Acrocercops praeclusa Meyrick, 1914
- Acrocercops stricta Meyrick, 1908
- Acrocercops strophala Meyrick, 1908
- Acrocercops telearcha Meyrick, 1908
- Acrocercops tenera Meyrick, 1914
- Acrocercops tetracrena Meyrick, 1908
- Acrocercops triacris Meyrick, 1908
- Acrocercops ustulatella (Stainton, 1859)
- Acrocercops zadocaea Meyrick, 1912
- Caloptilia acrotherma (Meyrick, 1908)
- Caloptilia argalea (Meyrick, 1908)
- Caloptilia ariana (Meyrick, 1914)
- Caloptilia dogmatica (Meyrick, 1908)
- Caloptilia euryptera (Meyrick, 1908)
- Caloptilia iselaea (Meyrick, 1914)
- Caloptilia leucolitha (Meyrick, 1912)
- Caloptilia perisphena (Meyrick, 1905)
- Caloptilia phalaropa (Meyrick, 1912)
- Caloptilia prismatica (Meyrick, 1907)
- Caloptilia scaeodesma (Meyrick, 1928)
- Caloptilia syrphetias (Meyrick, 1907)
- Caloptilia theivora (Walsingham, 1891)
- Caloptilia zachrysa (Meyrick, 1907)
- Corythoxestis pentarcha (Meyrick, 1922)
- Cyphosticha acrolitha Meyrick, 1908
- Epicephala albifrons (Stainton, 1859)
- Epicephala exetastis Meyrick, 1908
- Epicephala flagellata Meyrick, 1908
- Epicephala frenata Meyrick, 1908
- Epicephala trigonophora (Turner, 1900)
- Gibbovalva quadrifasciata (Stainton, 1862)
- Macarostola hieranthes (Meyrick, 1907)
- Macarostola paradisia Meyrick, 1908
- Macarostola thiasodes (Meyrick, 1912)
- Macarostola thriambica (Meyrick, 1907)
- Melanocercops desiccata (Meyrick, 1916)
- Parectopa capnias Meyrick, 1908
- Parectopa picroglossa Meyrick, 1912
- Phrixosceles campsigrapha Meyrick, 1908
- Phrixosceles literaria Meyrick, 1908
- Phyllocnistis citrella Stainton, 1856
- Phyllocnistis selenopa Meyrick, 1915
- Phyllonorycter conista (Meyrick, 1911)
- Povolnya platycosma (Meyrick, 1912)
- Stomphastis chalybacma (Meyrick, 1908)
- Synnympha diluviata Meyrick, 1915

==== Heliodinidae - sun moths ====
- Trichothyrsa pyrrhocoma Meyrick, 1912
- Trichothyrsa taedifera Meyrick, 1912

==== Hepialidae - ghost moths ====
- Endoclita purpurescens (Moore, [1883])
- Endoclita signifer (Walker, 1856)
- Palpifer taprobanus (Moore, 1887)

=== Hyblaeidae - teak moths ===
- Hyblaea constellata Guenée, 1852
- Hyblaea puera (Cramer, 1777)
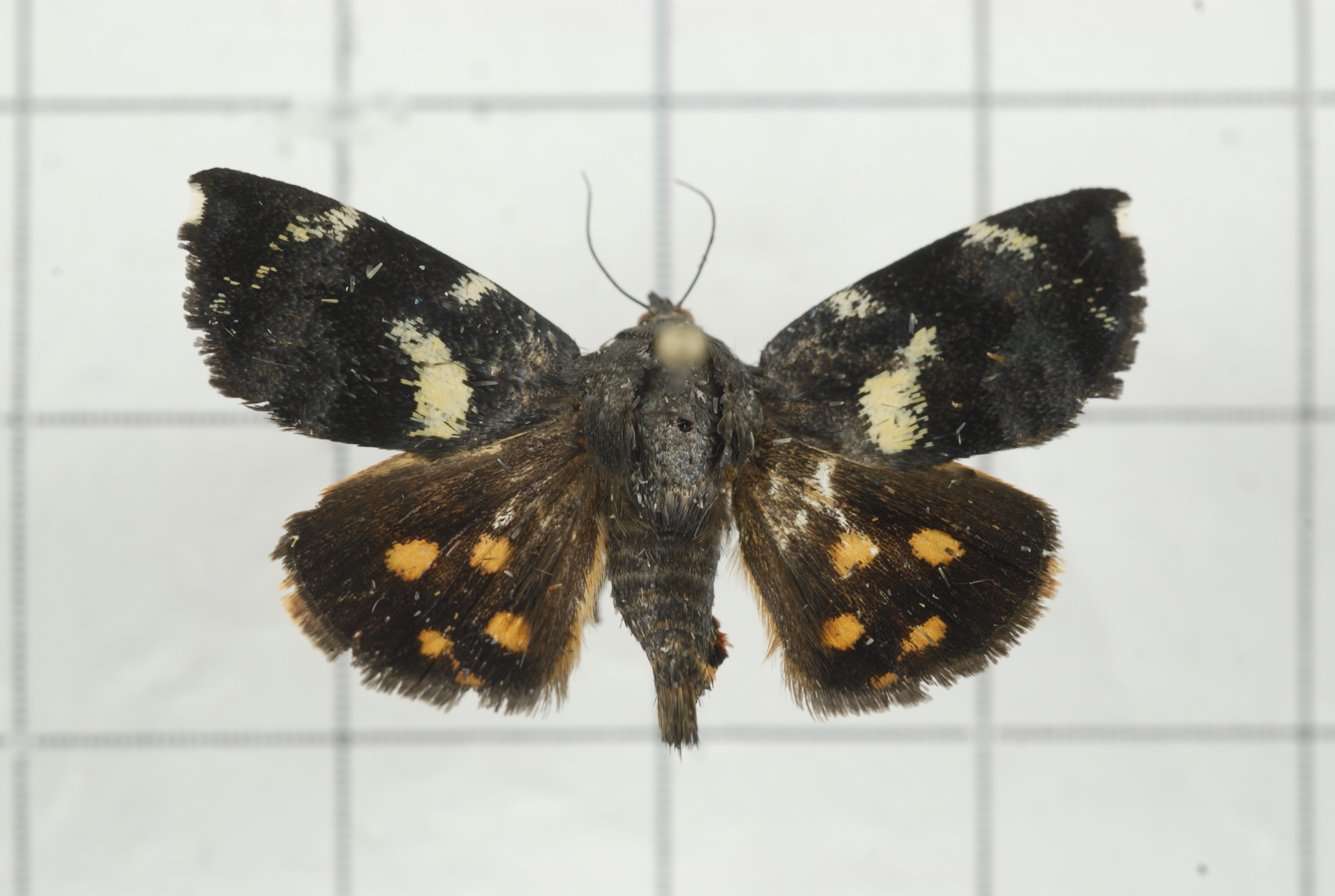
Hyblaea constellata

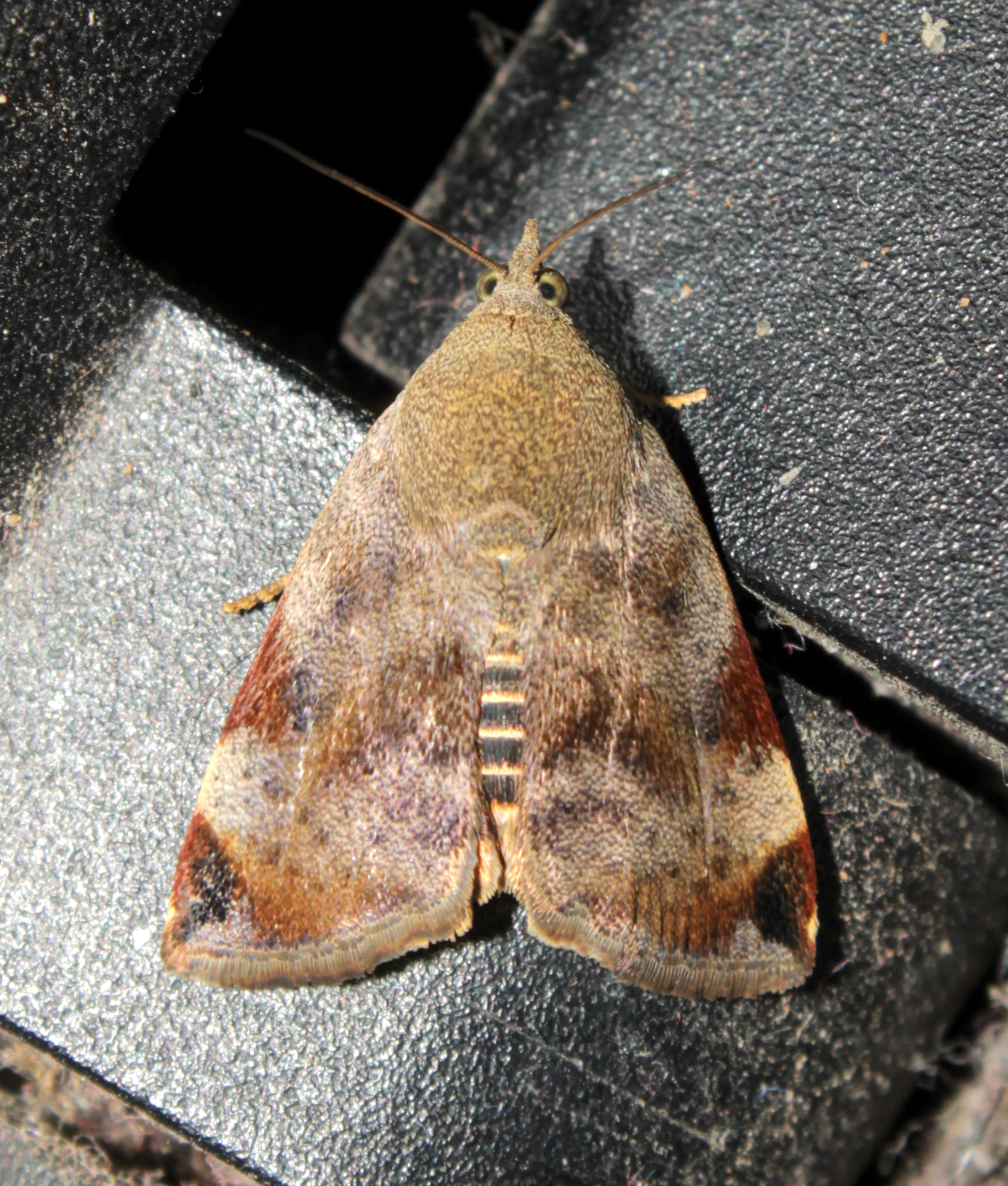
Hyblaea puera

=== Immidae - imma moths ===
- Imma albofascia (Felder, 1861)
- Imma accuralis (Walker, [1859])
- Imma chlorosphena Meyrick, 1906
- Imma ergasia (Meyrick, 1905)
- Imma grammarcha (Meyrick, 1905)
- Imma hyphantis Meyrick, 1906
- Imma lithosioides (Moore, 1887)
- Imma mackwoodi (Moore, 1887)
- Imma mylias Meyrick, 1906
- Imma psoricopa Meyrick, 1906
- Imma rugosalis Walker, [1859]
- Imma semicitra Meyrick, 1937
- Moca velutina Walker, 1863
Imma albofascia

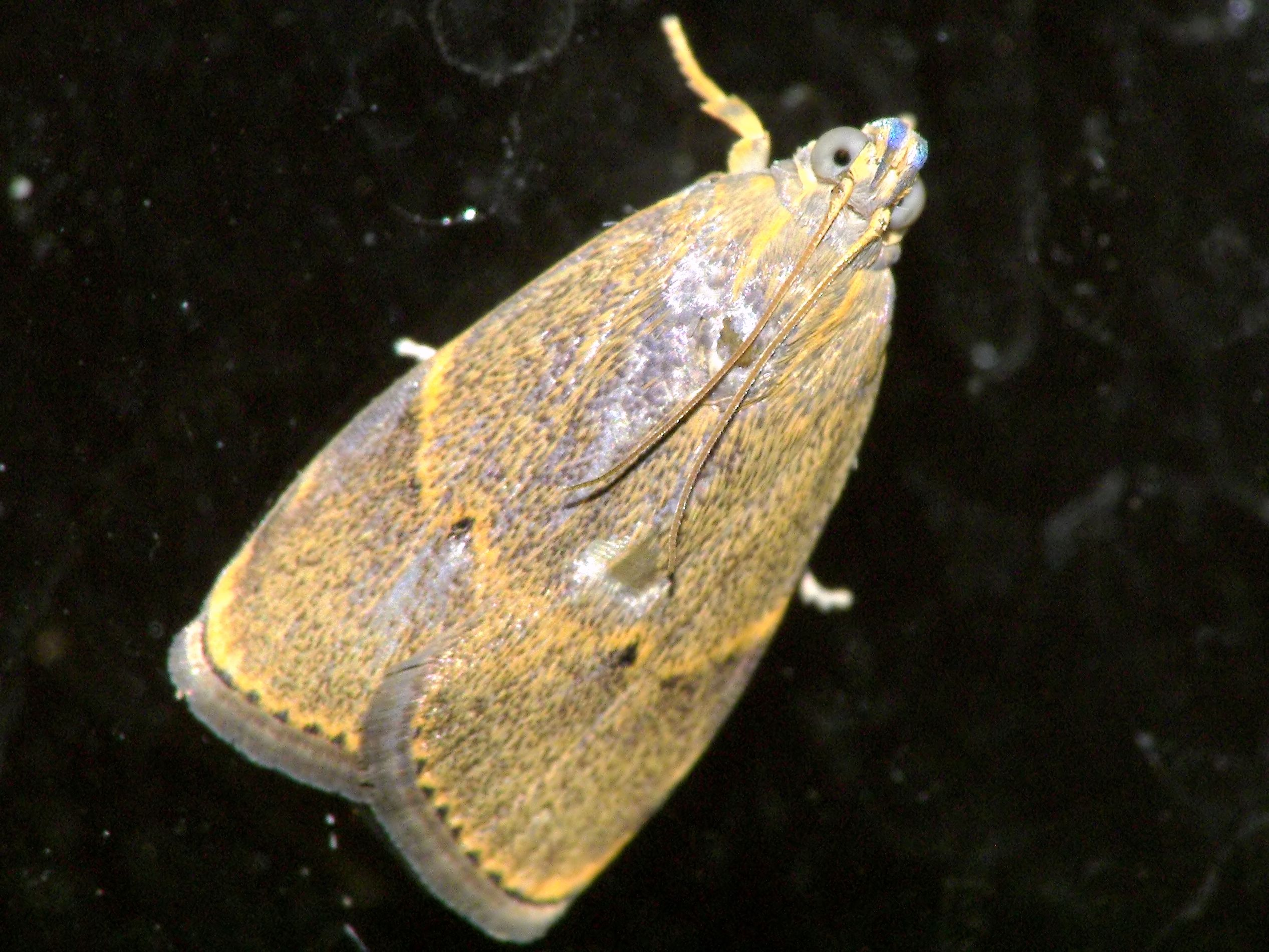
Imma mylias

=== Lacturidae - tropical burnet moths ===
- Anticrates chrysantha Mehrick, 1905
- Pyrozela xanthomima Meyrick, 1906

=== Lasiocampidae - tent and lappet moths ===
- Chilena strigula Walker, 1865
- Euthrix laeta (Walker, 1855)
- Gastropacha pardale (Walker, 1855)
- Kunugia latipennis (Walker, 1855)
- Lenodora vittata (Walker, 1855)
- Metanastria hyrtaca (Cramer, 1779)
- Odonestis ceylonica Tams, 1935
- Odonestis bheroba Moore, 1859
- Odonestis vita Moore, 1859
- Streblote dorsalis (Walker, 1866)
- Suana concolor (Walker, 1855)
- Trabala vishnou (Lefèbvre, 1827)
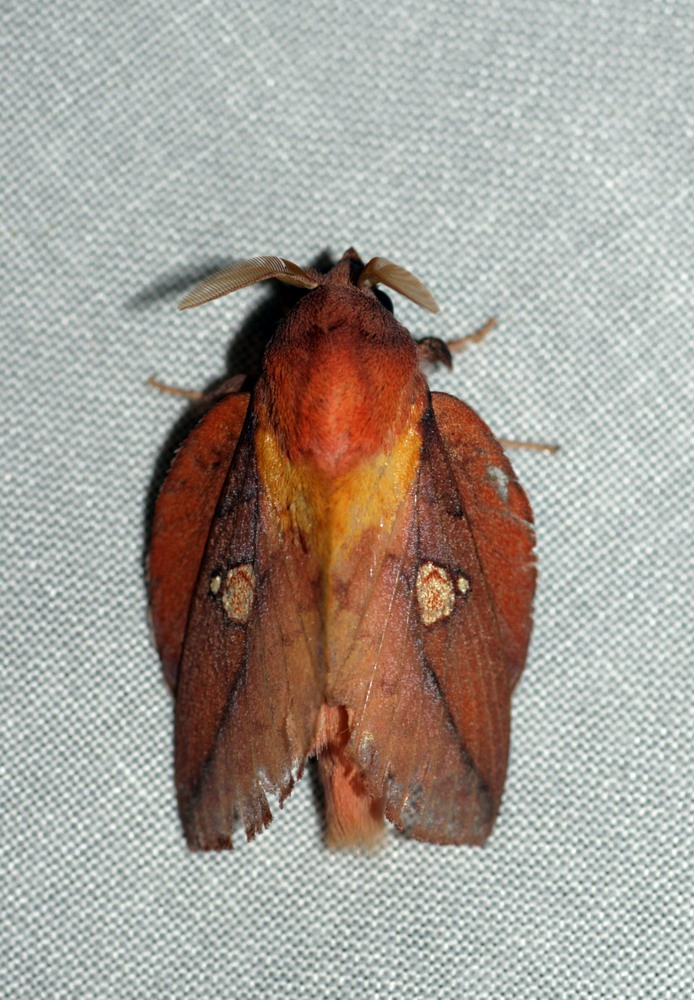
Euthrix laeta

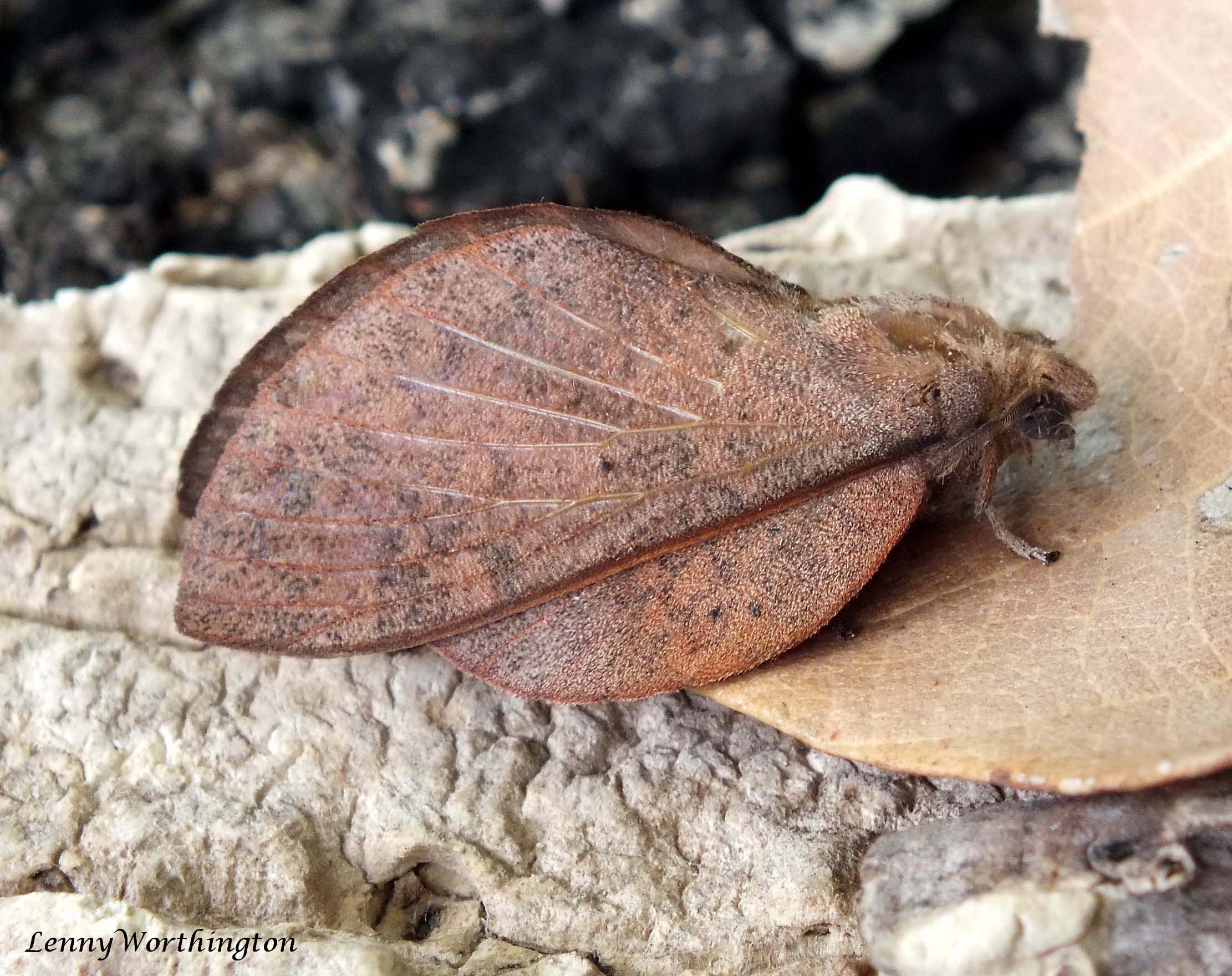
Gastropacha pardale

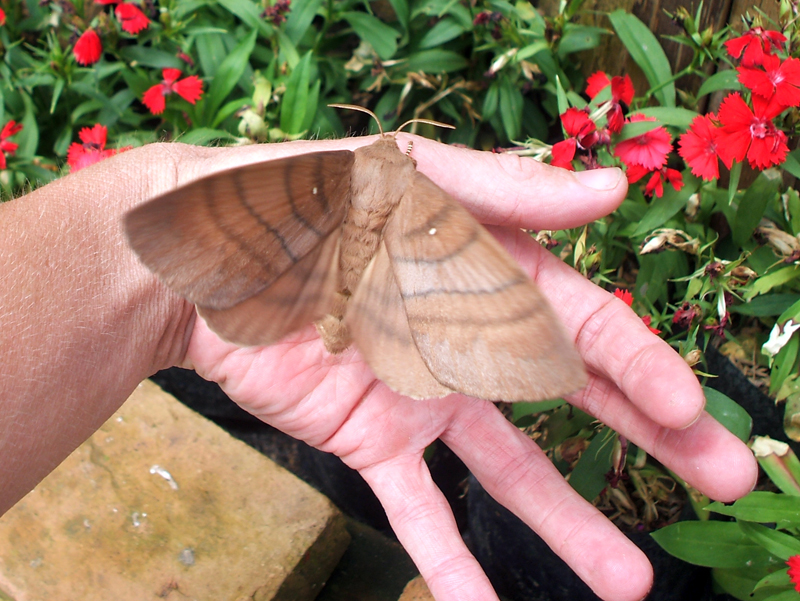
Kunugia latipennis

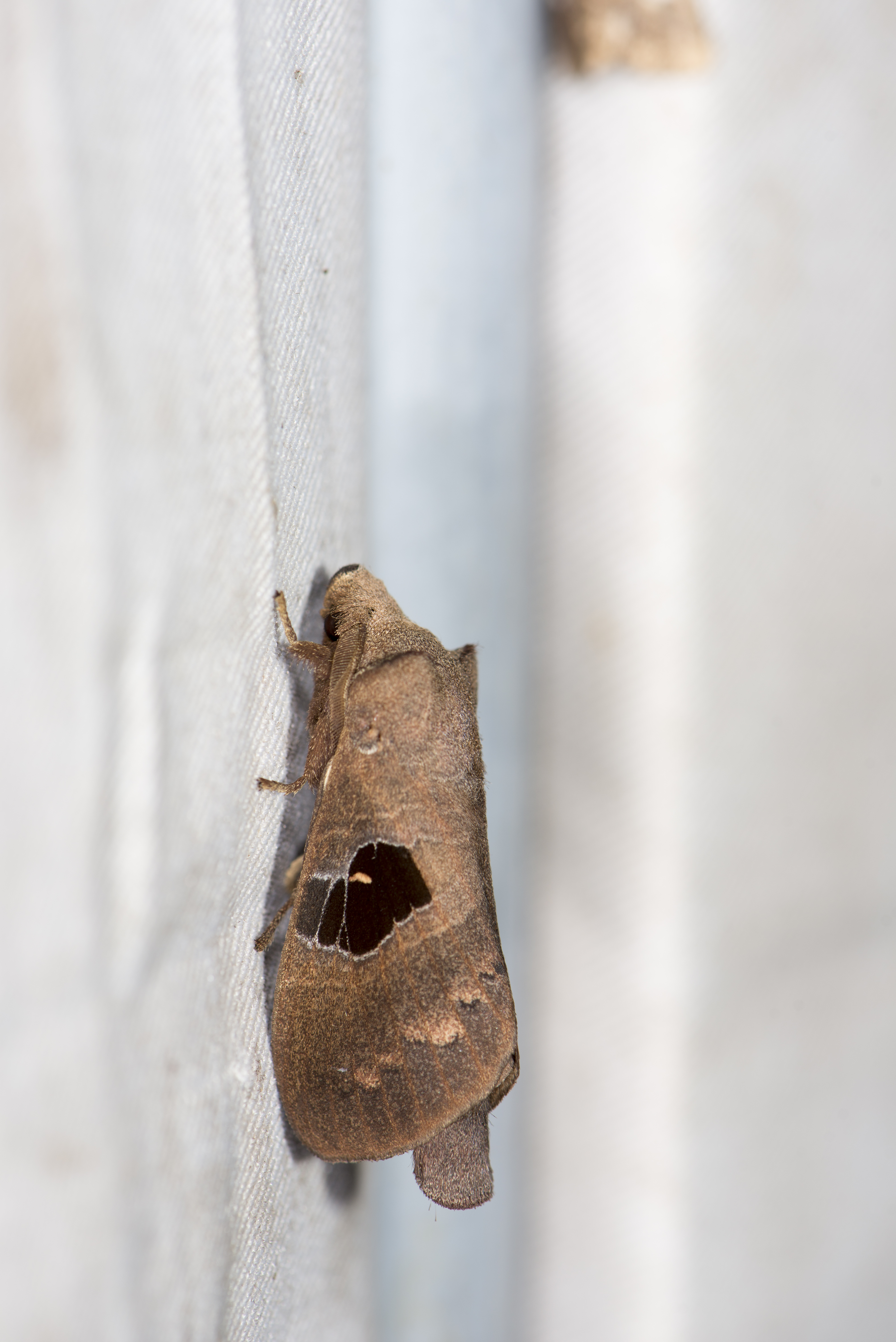
Metanastria hyrtaca

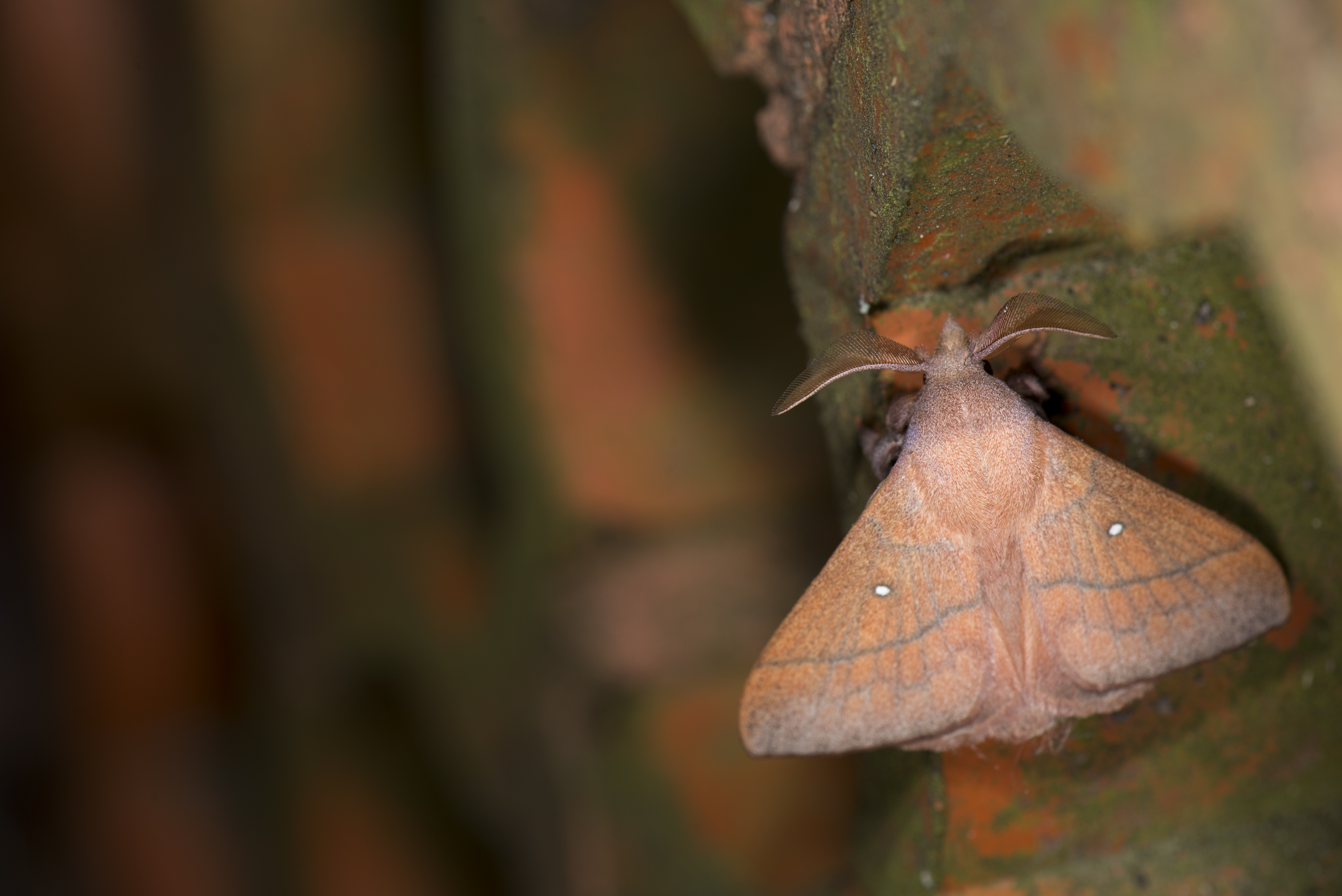
Odonestis bheroba

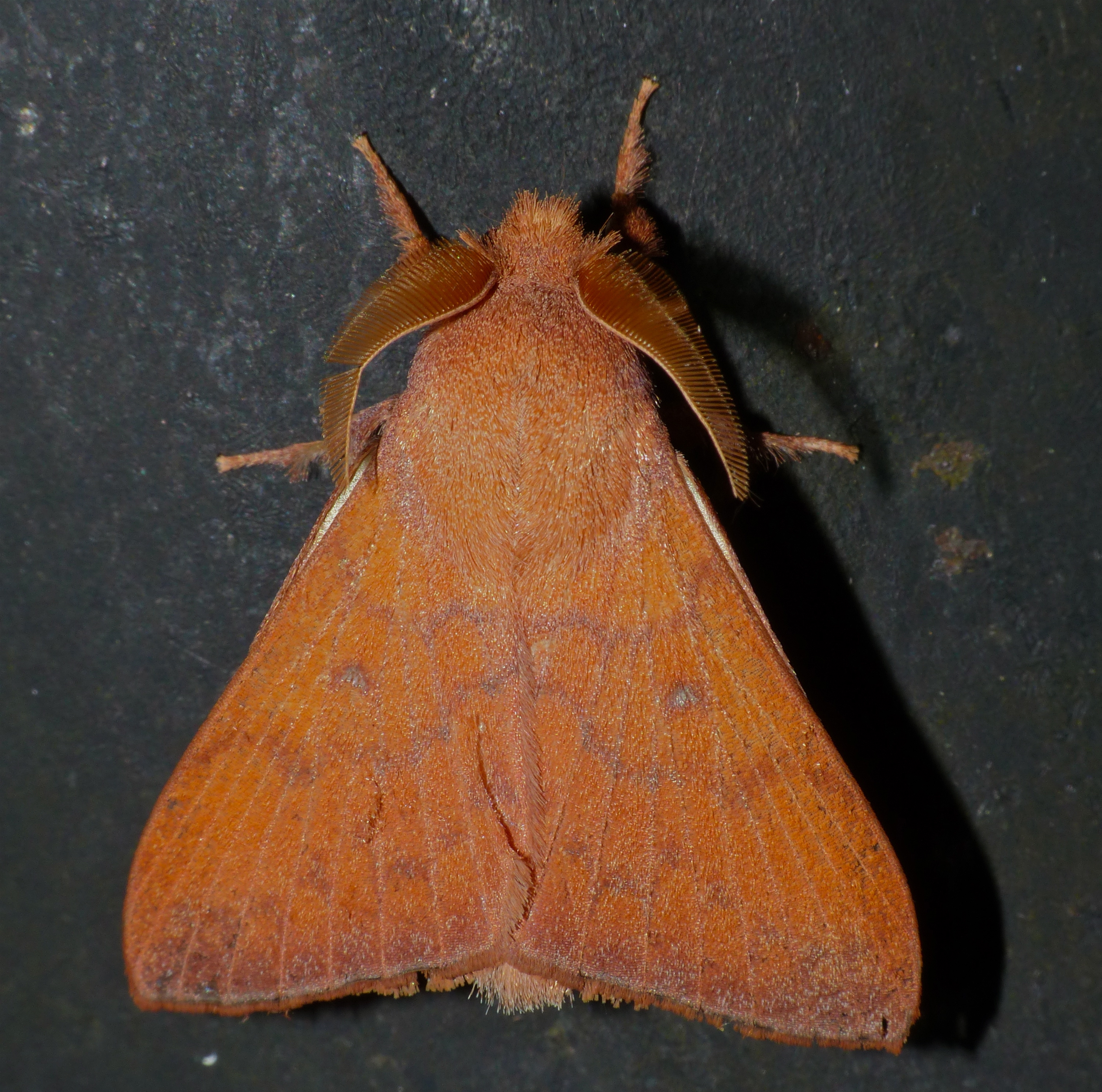
Odonestis vita

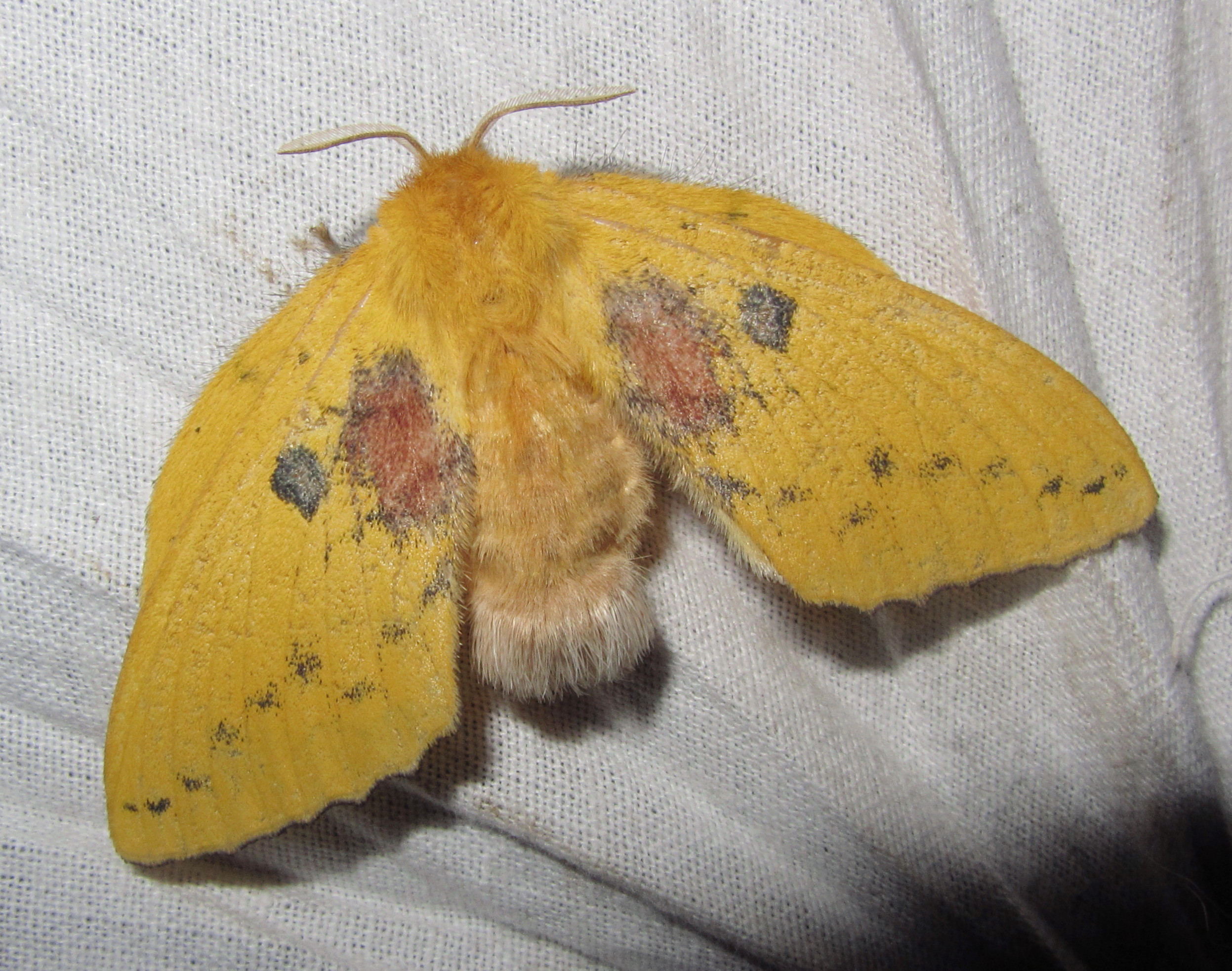
Trabala vishnou

=== Lecithoceridae - long-horned moths ===
- Alciphanes clavata Park, 2001
- Antiochtha achnastis (Meyrick, 1906)
- Antiochtha balbidota (Meyrick, 1905)
- Antiochtha cataclina (Meyrick, 1923)
- Antiochtha coelatella (Walker, 1864)
- Antiochtha longivincula Wu & Park, 1998
- Antiochtha oxyzona (Meyrick, 1910)
- Antiochtha stellulata (Meyrick, 1906)
- Antiochtha vigilax (Meyrick, 1910)
- Carodista fabajuxta Wu & Parkt, 1999
- Carodista grypotatos Park, 2001
- Carodista tribrachia Park, 2001
- Carodista wilpattuae Park, 2001
- Deltoplastis acrophanes (Meyrick, 1910)
- Deltoplastis amicella (Walker, 1864)
- Deltoplastis byssina (Meyrick, 1910)
- Deltoplastis cremnaspis (Meyrick, 1905)
- Deltoplastis clerodotis (Meyrick, 1910)
- Deltoplastis cognata Wu & Park, 1998
- Deltoplastis figurata (Meyrick, 1910)
- Deltoplastis figurodigita Wu & Park, 1998
- Deltoplastis lamellospina Wu & Park, 1998
- Deltoplastis laminospina Wu & Park, 1998
- Deltoplastis propensa (Meyrick, 1910)
- Deltoplastis stramminicornis (Meyrick, 1910)
- Doxogenes ceraena Wu & Park, 1999
- Doxogenes henicosura Wu & Parkt, 1999
- Eccedoxa thenara Wu, 2001
- Frisilia ceylonica Park, 2001
- Frisilia neacantha Wu & Park, 1998
- Frisilia serrata Wu & Park, 1999
- Frisilia thapsina Wu & Park, 1999
- Frisilia tricosura Wu & Park, 1999
- Frisilia trizeugma Wu & Park, 1999
- Homaloxestis grabia Wu & Park, 1999
- Homaloxestis lacerta Wu & Park, 1999
- Homaloxestis ochrosceles Meyrick, 1910
- Hygroplasta merinxa Wu & Park, 1998
- Hygroplasta monila Wu & Park, 1998
- Hygroplasta onyxijuxta Wu & Park, 1998
- Hygroplasta promyctera Wu & Park, 1998
- Hygroplasta spoliatella (Walker, 1864)
- Hyperochtha tanyglocha Wu & Park, 1999
- Hygroplasta utricula Wu & Park, 1998
- Kalocyrma epileuca Wu & Park, 1999
- Kalocyrma oxygonia Wu & Park, 1999
- Lecithocera alternella (Walker, 1864)
- Lecithocera autologa Meyrick, 1910
- Lecithocera caecilia Meyrick, 1918
- Lecithocera capnaula (Meyrick, 1911)
- Lecithocera combusta Meyrick, 191
- Lecithocera cornutella (Walker, 1864)
- Lecithocera crypsigenes Meyrick, 1929
- Lecithocera epomia (Meyrick, 1905)
- Lecithocera exophthalma (Meyrick, 1911)
- Lecithocera fornacalis (Meyrick, 1911)
- Lecithocera glaphyritis Meyrick, 1918
- Lecithocera haemylopis (Meyrick, 1911)
- Lecithocera homocentra Meyrick, 1910
- Lecithocera itrinea Meyrick, 1910
- Lecithocera mazina Meyrick, 1910
- Lecithocera mesosura Wu & Park, 1999
- Lecithocera metopaena Wu & Park, 1999
- Lecithocera omphacias Meyrick, 1910
- Lecithocera phratriastis Meyrick, 1929
- Lecithocera plicata Wu & Park, 1999
- Lecithocera pogonikuma Wu & Park, 1999
- Lecithocera sinuosa Meyrick, 1910
- Lecithocera signifera Felder, 1875
- Lecithocera sporochlora Meyrick, 1929
- Mnesteria pharetrata (Meyrick, 1905)
- Odites atmopa Meyrick, 1914
- Odites isocentra (Meyrick, 1906)
- Odites orthometra Meyrick, 1908
- Odites paracyrta (Meyrick, 1905)
- Odites psilotis (Meyrick, 1905)
- Onebala blandiella Walker, 1864
- Philharmonia insigna Wu & Park, 1999
- Psammoris carpaea Meyrick, 1906
- Quassitagma duplicata Gozmány, 1978
- Quassitagma laminospina Wu & Park, 1999
- Teucrodoxa monetella (Felder & Rogenhofer, 1875)
- Thubana xanthoteles (Meyrick, 1923)
- Timyra aulonitis Meyrick, 1908
- Timyra caulisivena Wu & Park, 1999
- Timyra machlas Meyrick, 1905
- Timyra metallanthes Meyrick, 1905
- Timyra oculinota Wu & Park, 1999
- Timyra sphenias Meyrick, 1905
- Timyra stenomacra Wu & Park, 1999
- Tisis mendicella Walker, 1864
- Torodora facula Wu & Park, 1999
- Torodora piscarifurca Wu & Park, 1999
- Torodora ventralilata Wu & Park, 1999

=== Limacodidae - slug caterpillar moths ===
- Altha adala (Moore, 1859)
- Altha nivea Walker, 1862
- Altha subnotata Walker, 1865
- Aphendala ferreogrisea (Hampson, 1910)
- Aphendala recta (Hampson, 1893)
- Birthama obliquifascia Hampson 1893
- Cheromettia apicata (Moore, 1877) - syn. Belippa laleana
- Cheromettia ferruginea Moore, 1877
- Macroplectra ceylonica (Hampson, 1906)
- Macroplectra nararia Herrich-Schäffer, 1854
- Miresa albipuncta Walker
- Miresa argentifera Walker
- Miresa sibinoides Hering, 1931
- Narosa conspersa Walker, 1855
- Narosa fletcheri West, 1937
- Natada sericea (Hampson, 1893)
- Oxyplax ochracea (Moore, 1883)
- Parasa bicolor Walker, 1855
- Parasa hampsoni Dyar, 1894
- Parasa hilaris Westwood, 1848
- Parasa lepida (Cramer, 1799)
- Parasa similis Felder, 1874
- Rarithea phocea (Hampson, 1910)
- Scopelodes venosa Walker, 1855
- Spatulifimbria castaneiceps Hampson, 1892
- Thosea aperiens Walker, 1865
- Thosea cana Walker, 1855
- Thosea cervina Moore, 1877

=== Lyonetiidae - lyonet moths ===
- Crobylophora daricella Meyrick, 1881
- Crobylophora staterias Meyrick 1905
- Leucoptera coffeella (Guérin-Méneville, 1842)
- Lyonetia leurodes Meyrick, 1915
- Lyonetia praefulva Meyrick, 1911
- Prytaneutis clavigera Meyrick, 1911

=== Momphidae - mompha moths ===
- Bifascioides leucomelanella (Rebel, 1917)
- Patanotis harmosta Meyrick, 1913
- Patanotis metallidias Meyrick, 1913
- Phalaritica vindex Meyrick, 1913
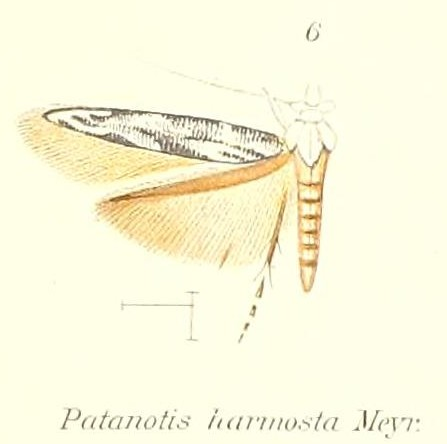
Patanotis harmosta

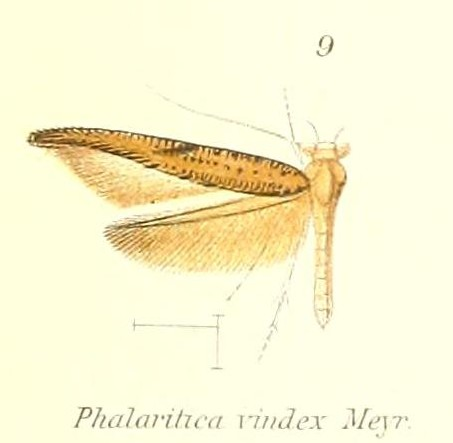
Phalaritica vindex

=== Nepticulidae - nepticulid moths ===
- Ectoedemia sporadopa (Meyrick, 1911)
- Stigmella polydoxa (Meyrick, 1911)

=== Noctuidae - owlet moths ===
- Adisura atkinsoni Moore, 1881
- Ariola coelisigna Walker, 1858
- Blasticorhinus
- Brithys crini Fabricius, 1775
- Chrysodeixis acuta (Walker, [1858])
- Chrysodeixis chalcites (Esper, 1789)
- Chrysodeixis permissa (Walker, 1858)
- Helicoverpa armigera (Hübner, [1809])
- Polytela gloriosae (Fabricius, 1775)
- Rabila frontalis Walker, 1865
- Pseudacidalia albicosta Moore, 1885
- Tathodelta purpurascens Hampson, 1893
- Trisula variegata Moore, 1858
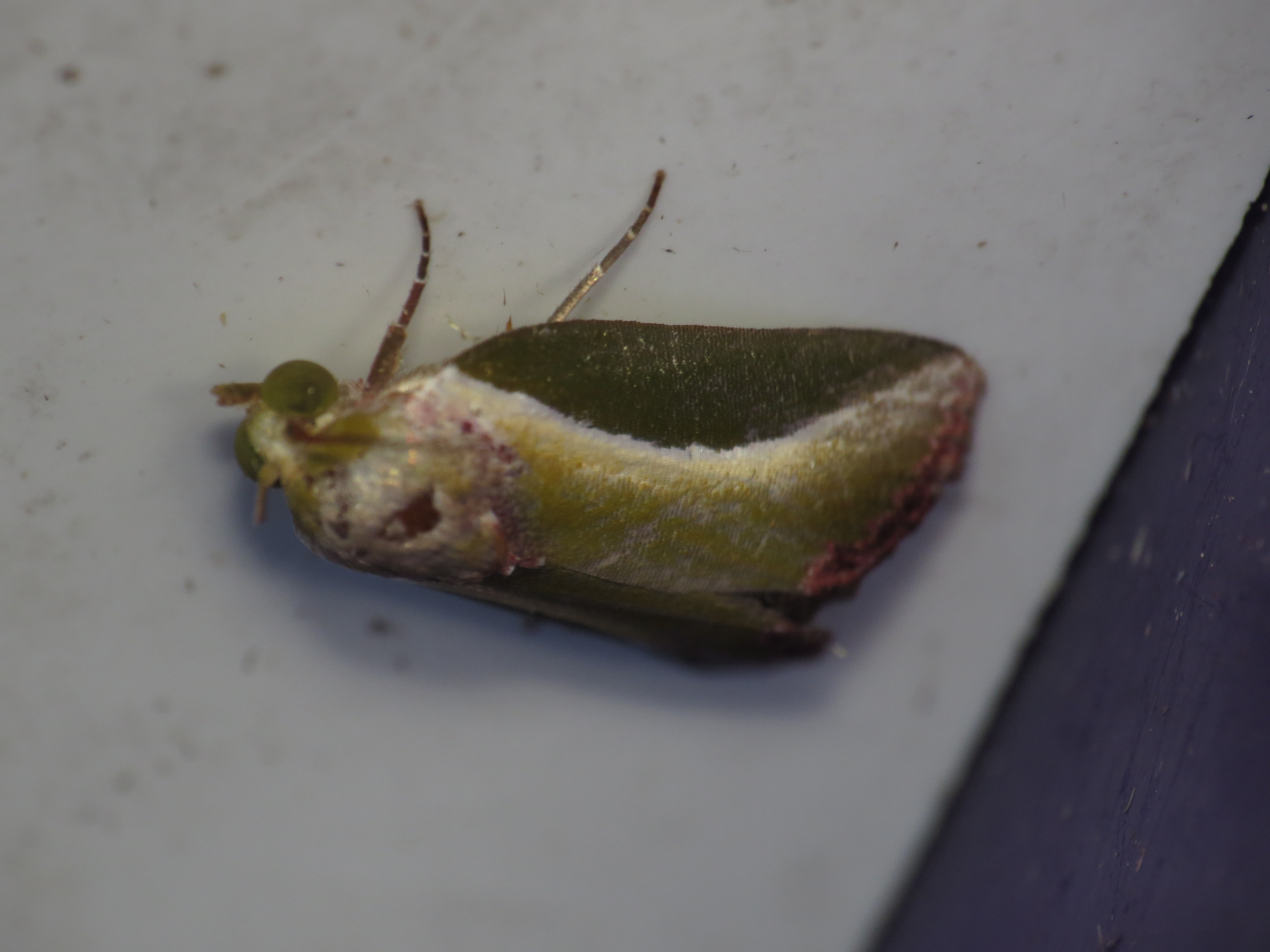
Ariola coelisigna

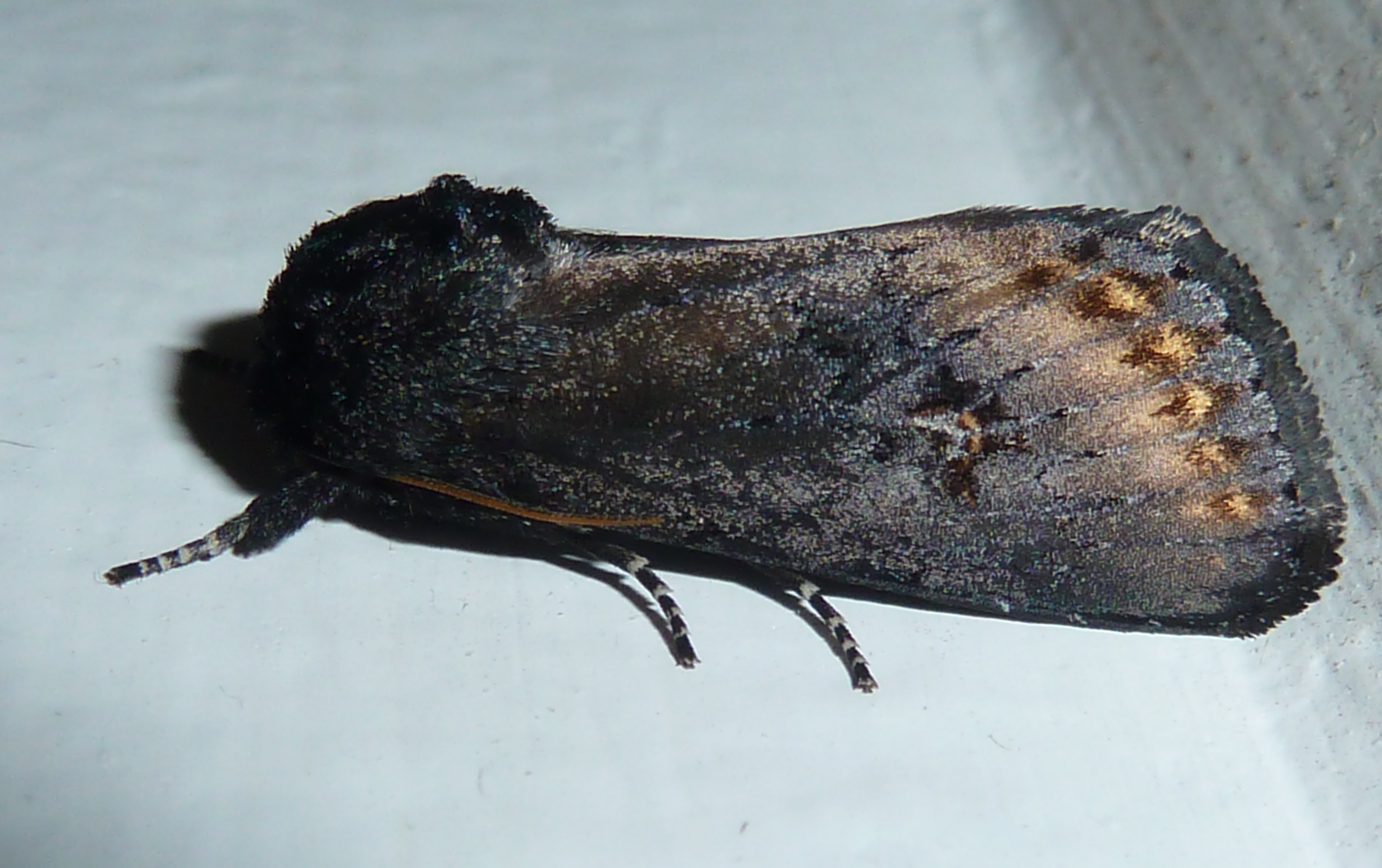
Brithys crini

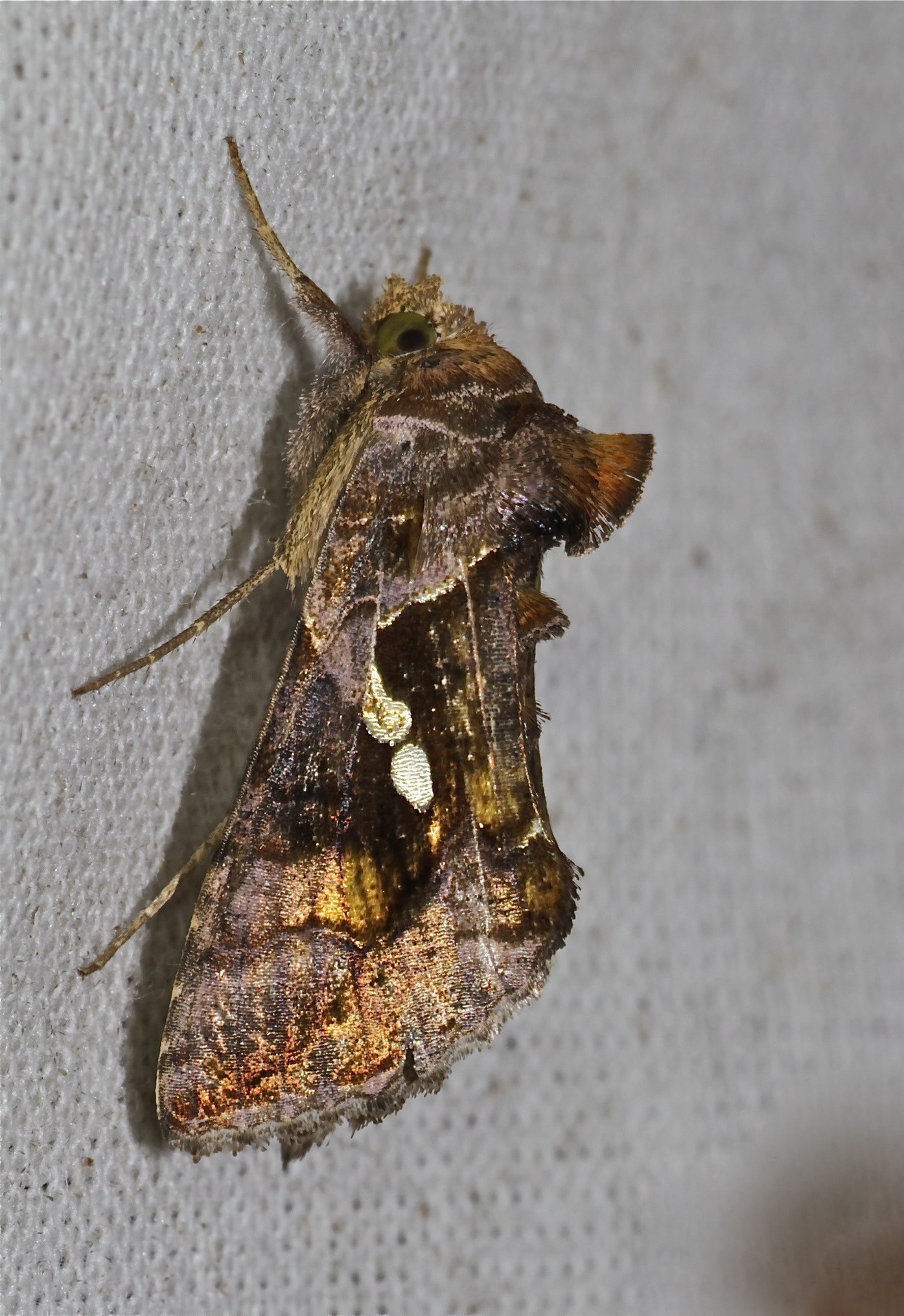
Chrysodeixis acuta

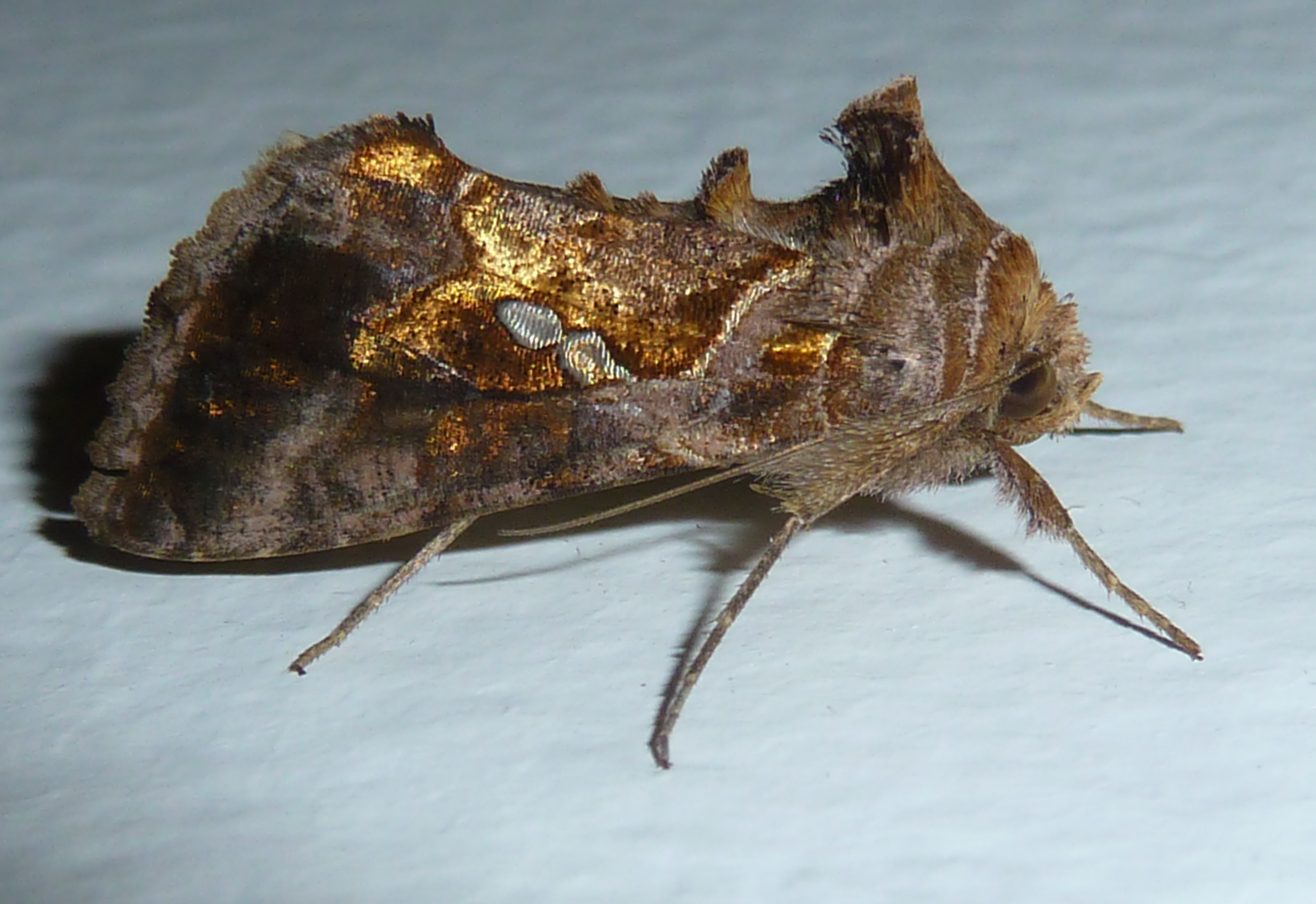
Chrysodeixis chalcites

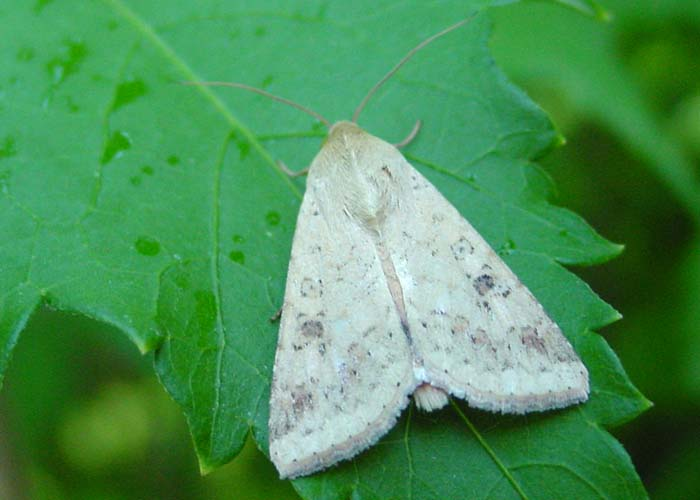
Helicoverpa armigera

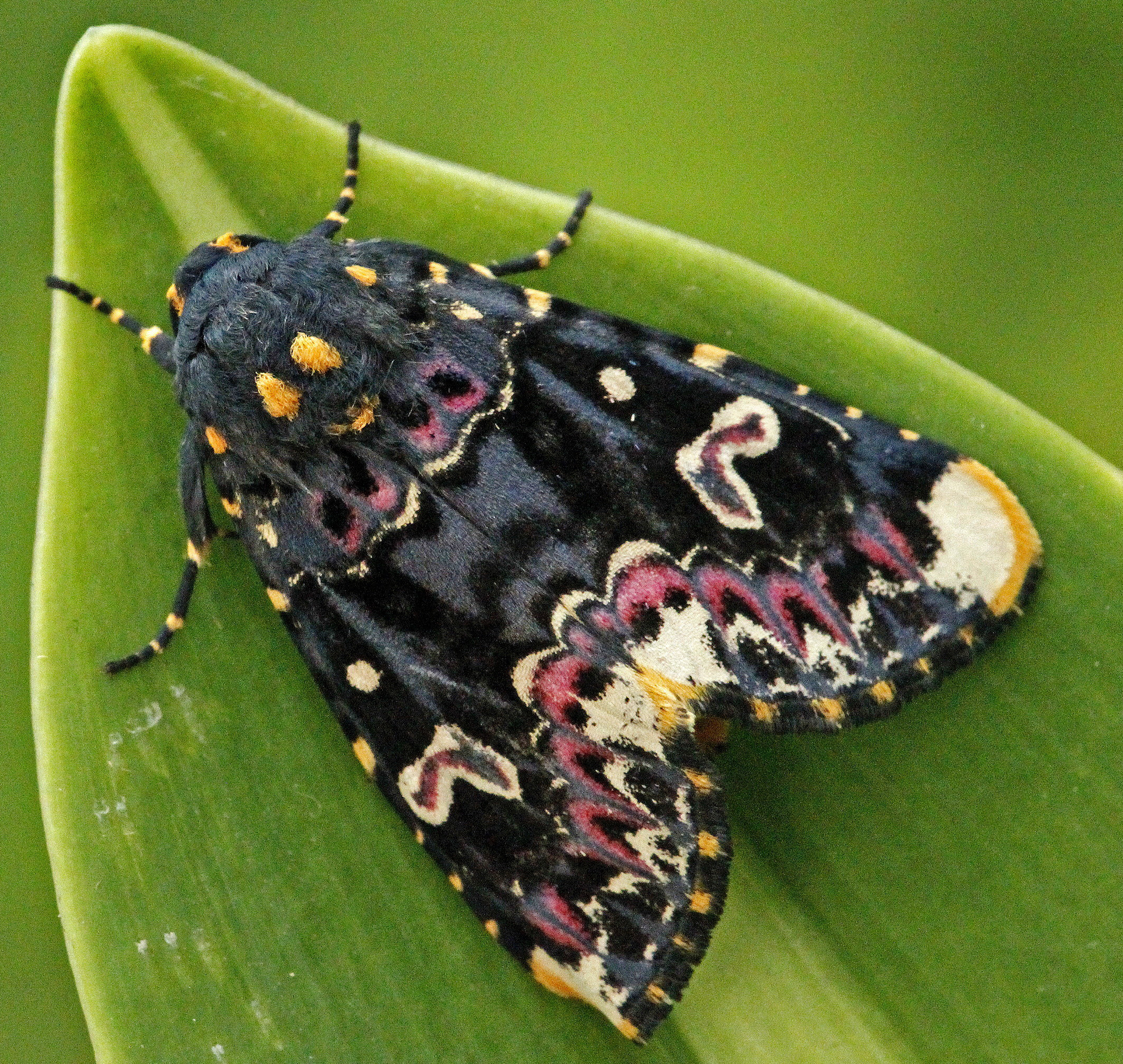
Polytela gloriosae

==== Acontiinae - bird dropping moths ====
- Acontia crocata (Guenée, 1852)
- Acontia marmoralis (Fabricius, 1794)
- Acontia opalinoides Guenée, 1852
- Acontia sexpunctata Fabricius, 1794
- Arasada pyraliformis Moore, 1885
- Arenarba destituta (Moore, 1884)
- Aroana cingalensis Walker, [1866]
- Carmara subcervina Walker, [1863]
- Cerynea contentaria (Walker, 1861)
- Cerynea ustula (Hampson, 1898)
- Cingalesa strigicosta Hampson, 1893
- Cophanta funestalis Walker, 1864
- Corgatha albivertex Hampson, 1907
- Corgatha atrifalcis Hampson, 1907
- Corgatha minor (Moore, [1885])
- Corgatha semipardata (Walker, 1861)
- Corgatha trichogyia Hampson, 1907
- Corgatha zonalis Walker, [1859]
- Deltote flavifrons Moore, [1887]
- Enispa elataria (Walker, 1861)
- Erastroides oliviaria Hampson, 1893
- Holocryptis erubescens (Hampson, 1893)
- Hyposada postvittata (Moore, 1887)
- Lophoruza lunifera (Moore; 1885)
- Maliattha lativitta Moore, 1881
- Maliattha renalis Moore, 1882
- Maliattha signifera (Walker, [1858])
- Niaccaba sumptualis Walker, 1865
- Pseudozarba mianoides Hampson, 1893
- Sugia stygia (Butler, 1878)
- Zurobata vacillans (Walker, 1864)

==== Acronictinae ====
- Acronicta pruinosa (Guenée, 1852)
- Ancara obliterans Walker, 1858
- Athetis reclusa (Walker, 1862)
- Athetis renalis (Moore, [1884])
- Craniophora fasciata Moore, [1884]
- Simyra confusa Walker, 1856
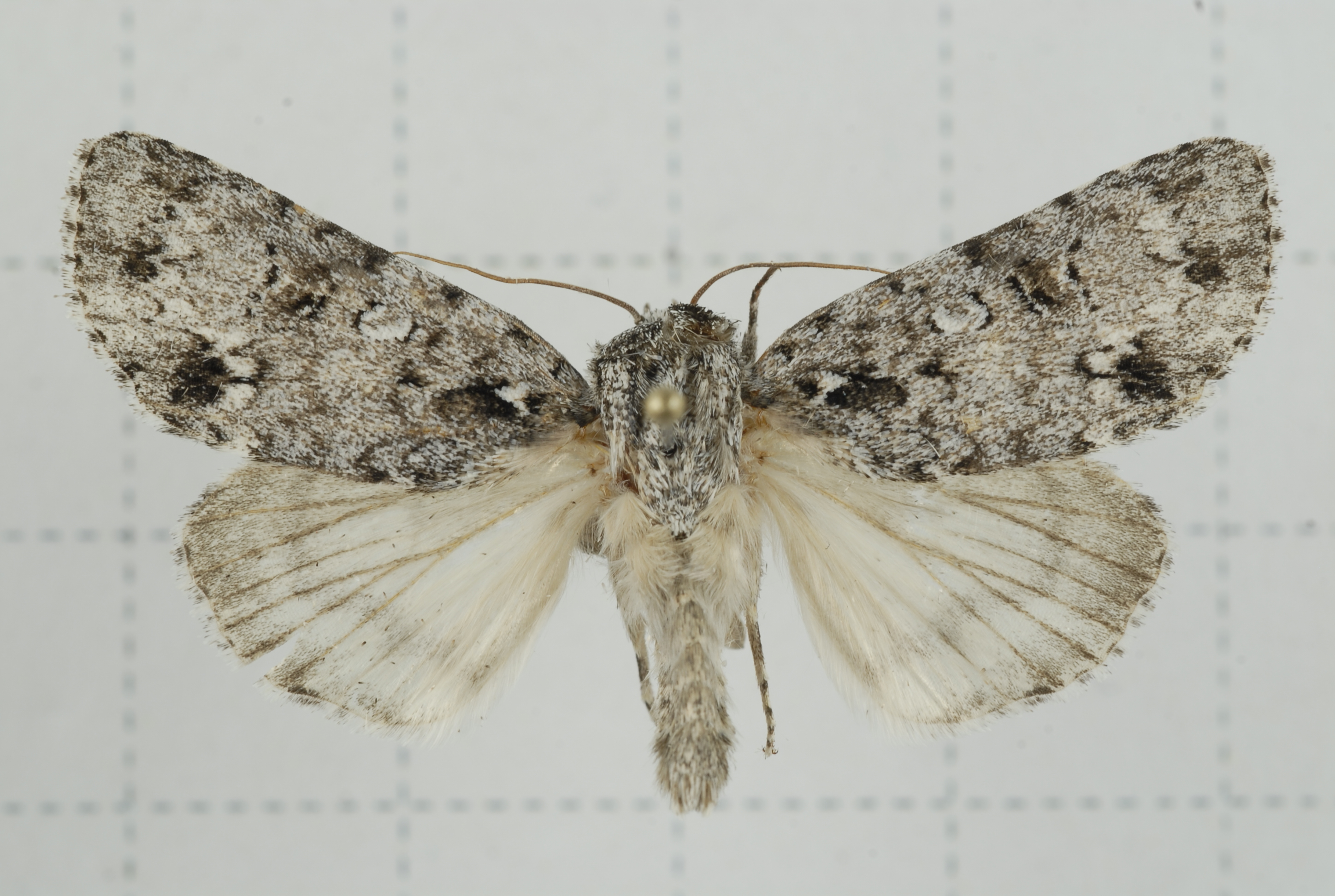
Acronicta pruinosa

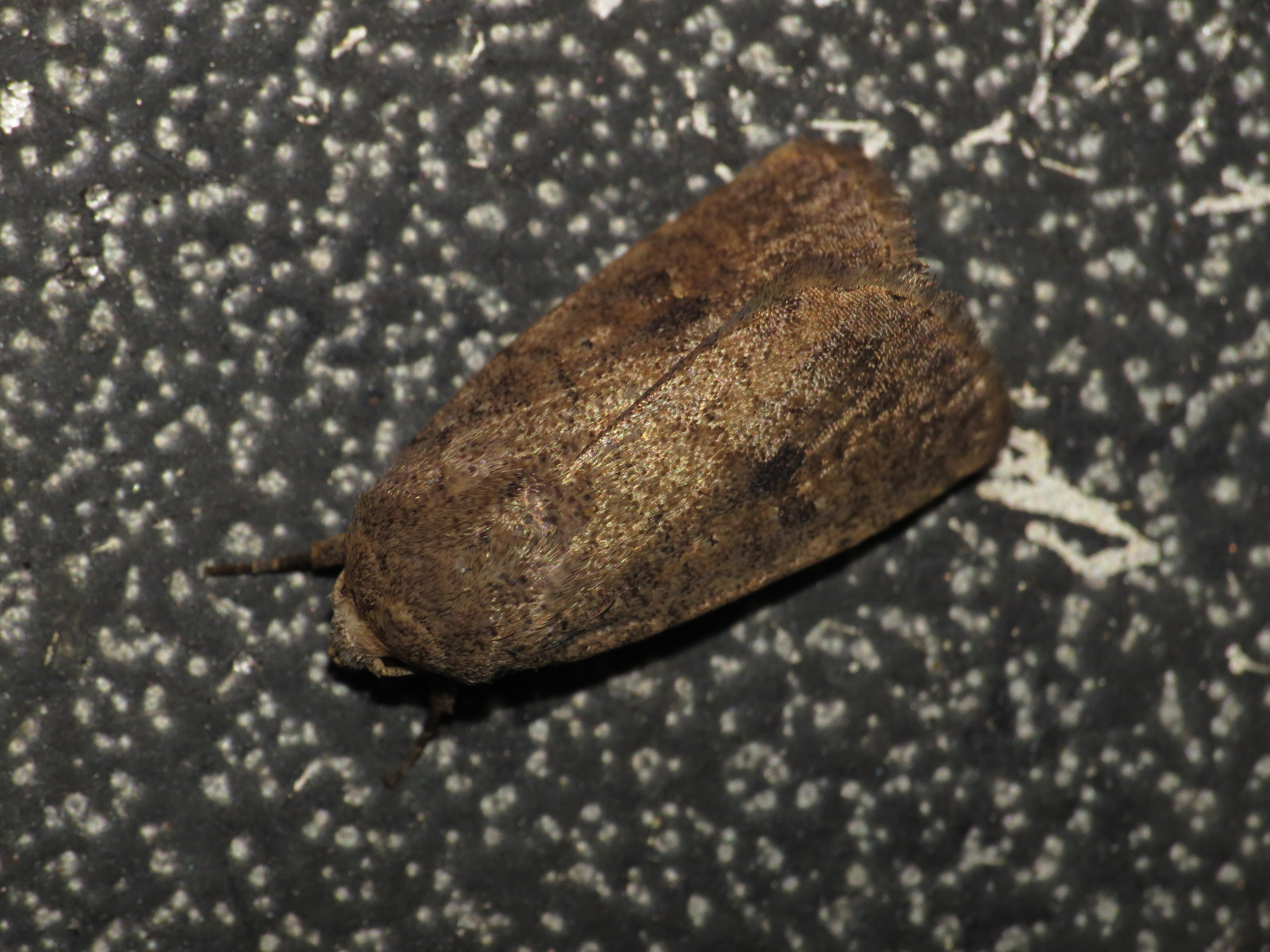
Athetis reclusa

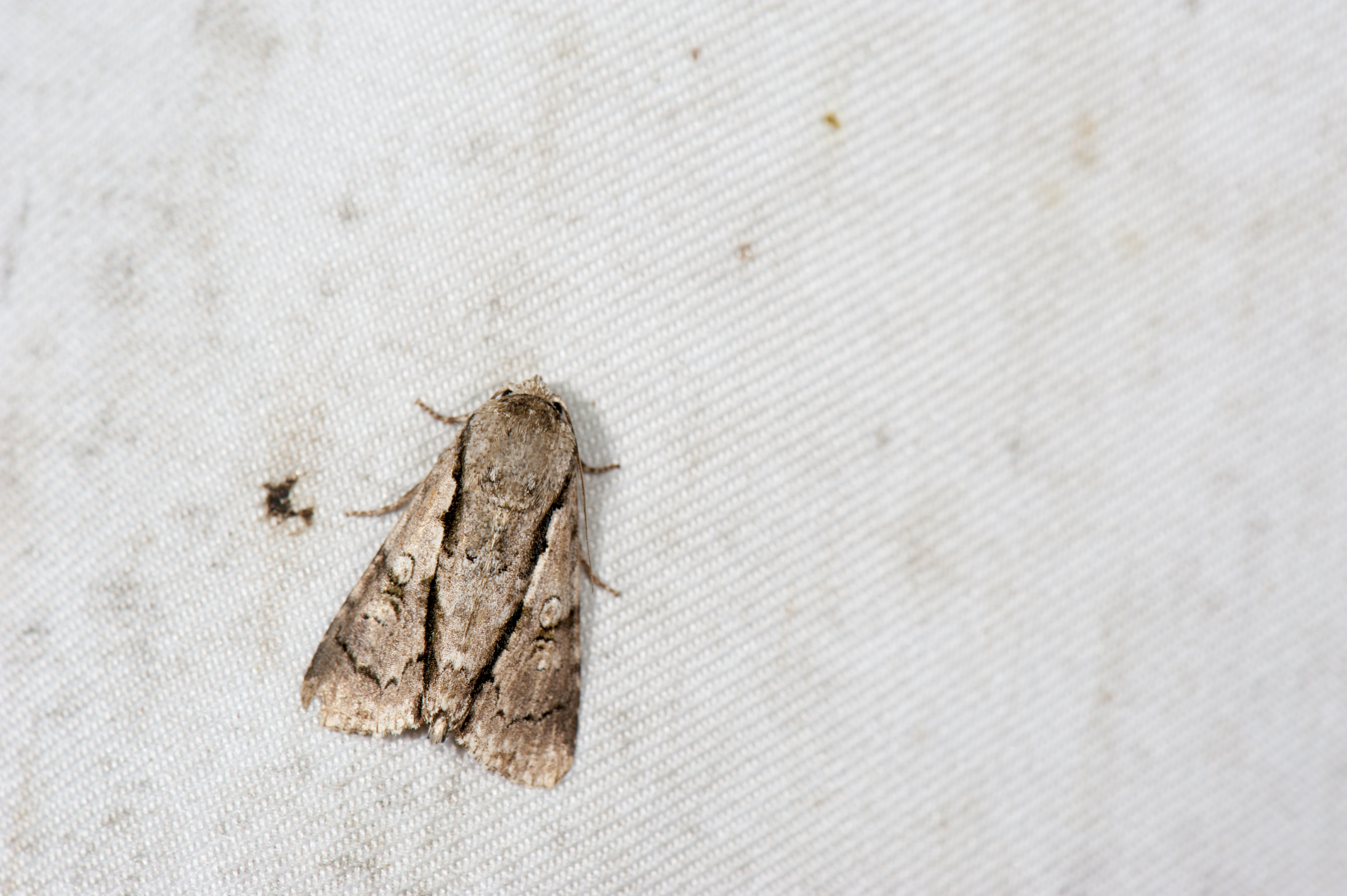
Craniophora fasciata

==== Agaristinae ====
- Aegocera bimacula Walker, 1854
- Aegocera venulia (Cramer, [1777])
- Episteme nigripennis Butler, 1875
- Mimeusemia ceylonica Hampson, 1893
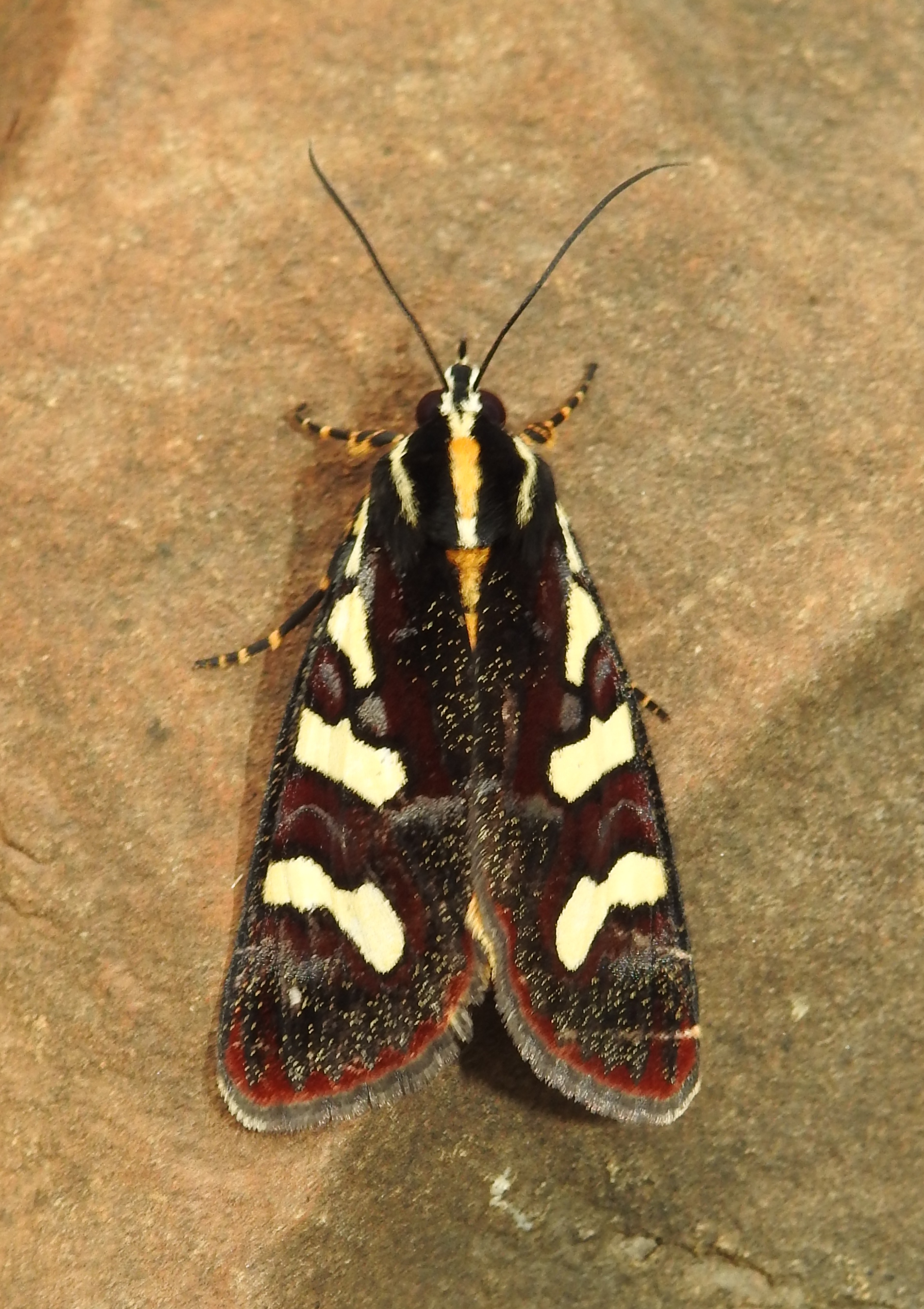
Aegocera bimacula

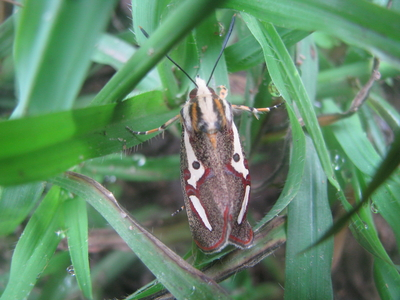
Aegocera venulia

==== Amphipyrinae ====
- Aucha velans Walker, [1858]
- Callyna costiplaga Moore, 1885
- Callyna jugaria Walker, 1858
- Callyna monoleuca Walker, 1858
- Iambia thwaitesii (Moore, 1885)
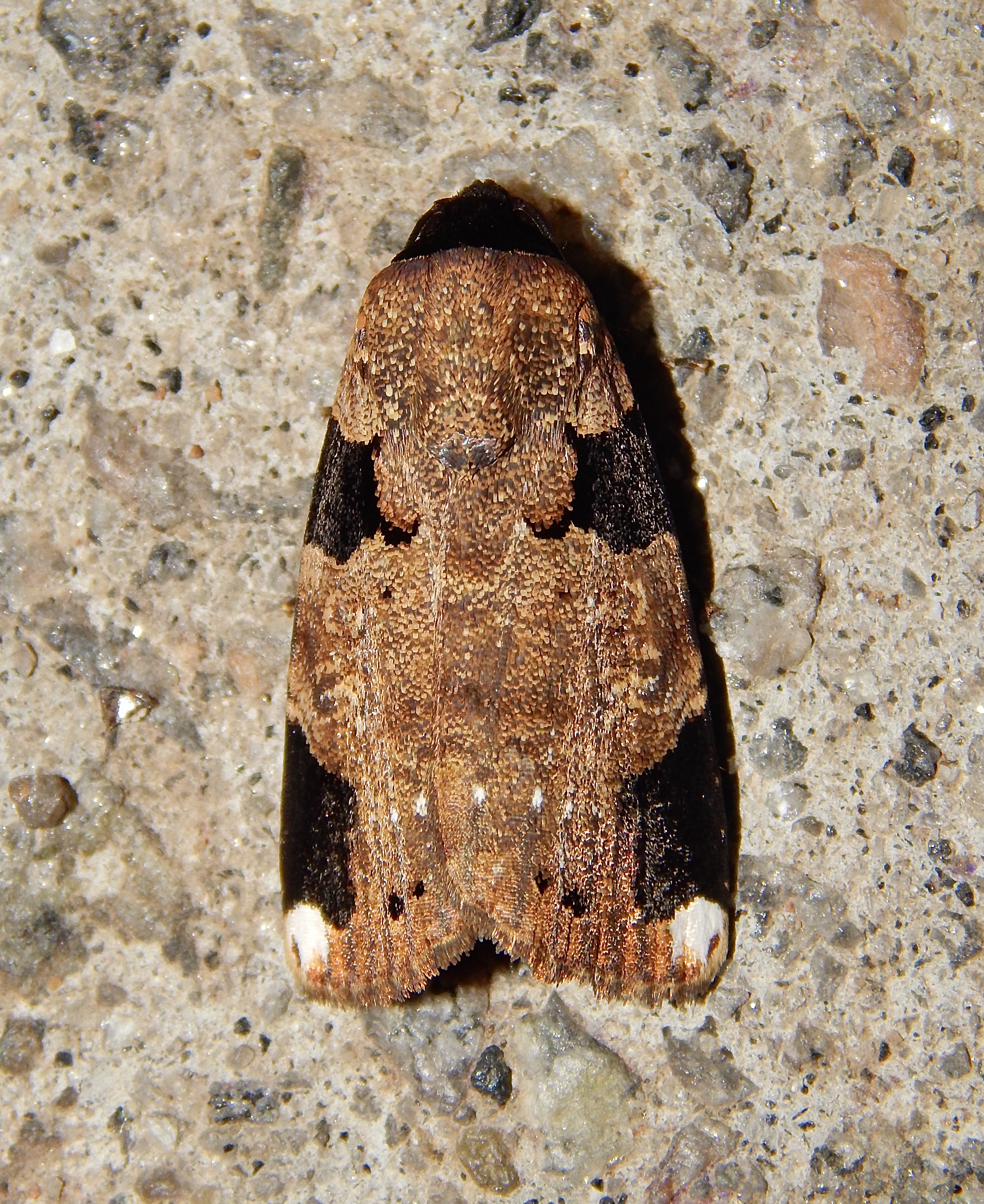
Callyna costiplaga

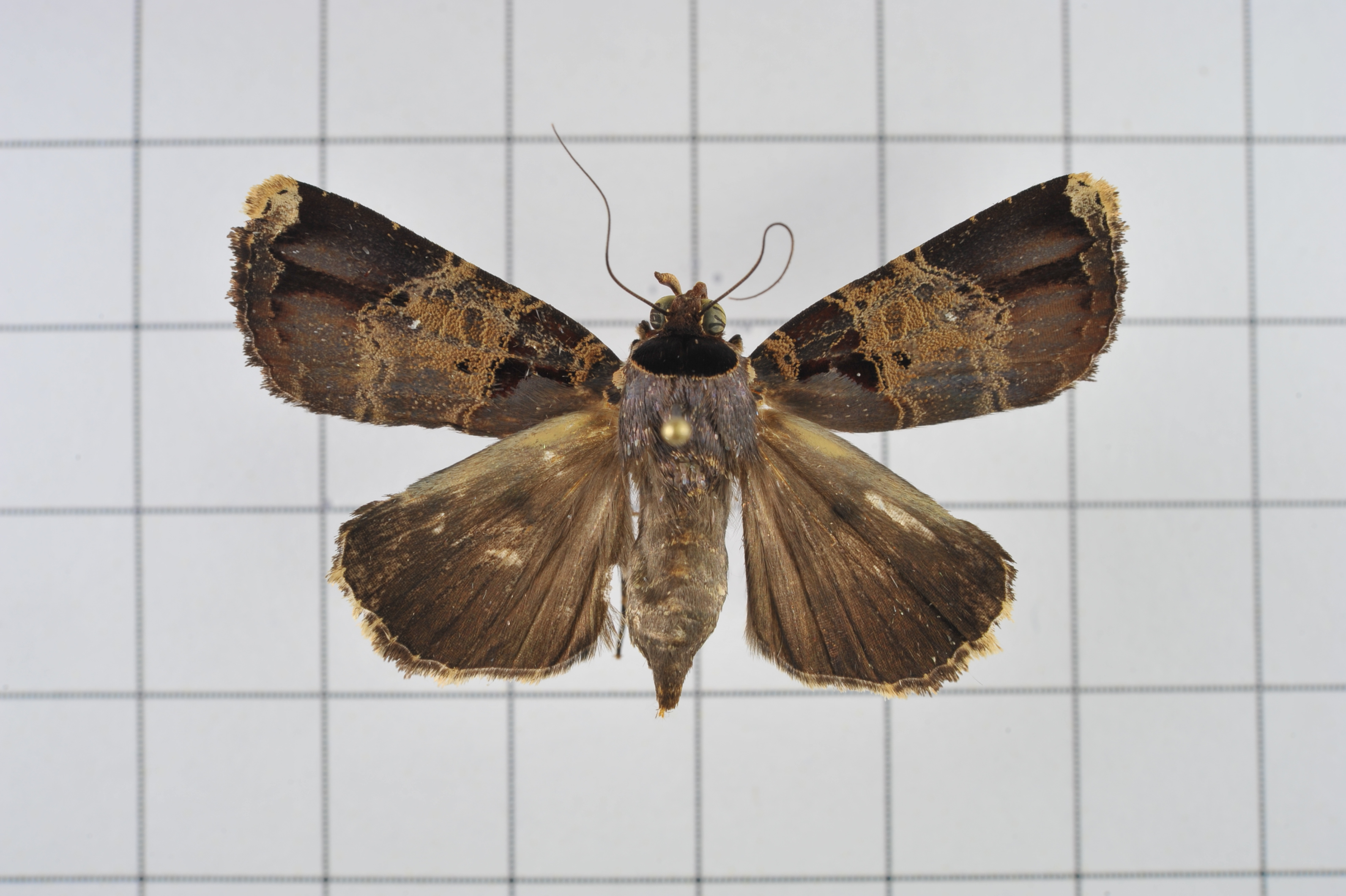
Callyna jugaria

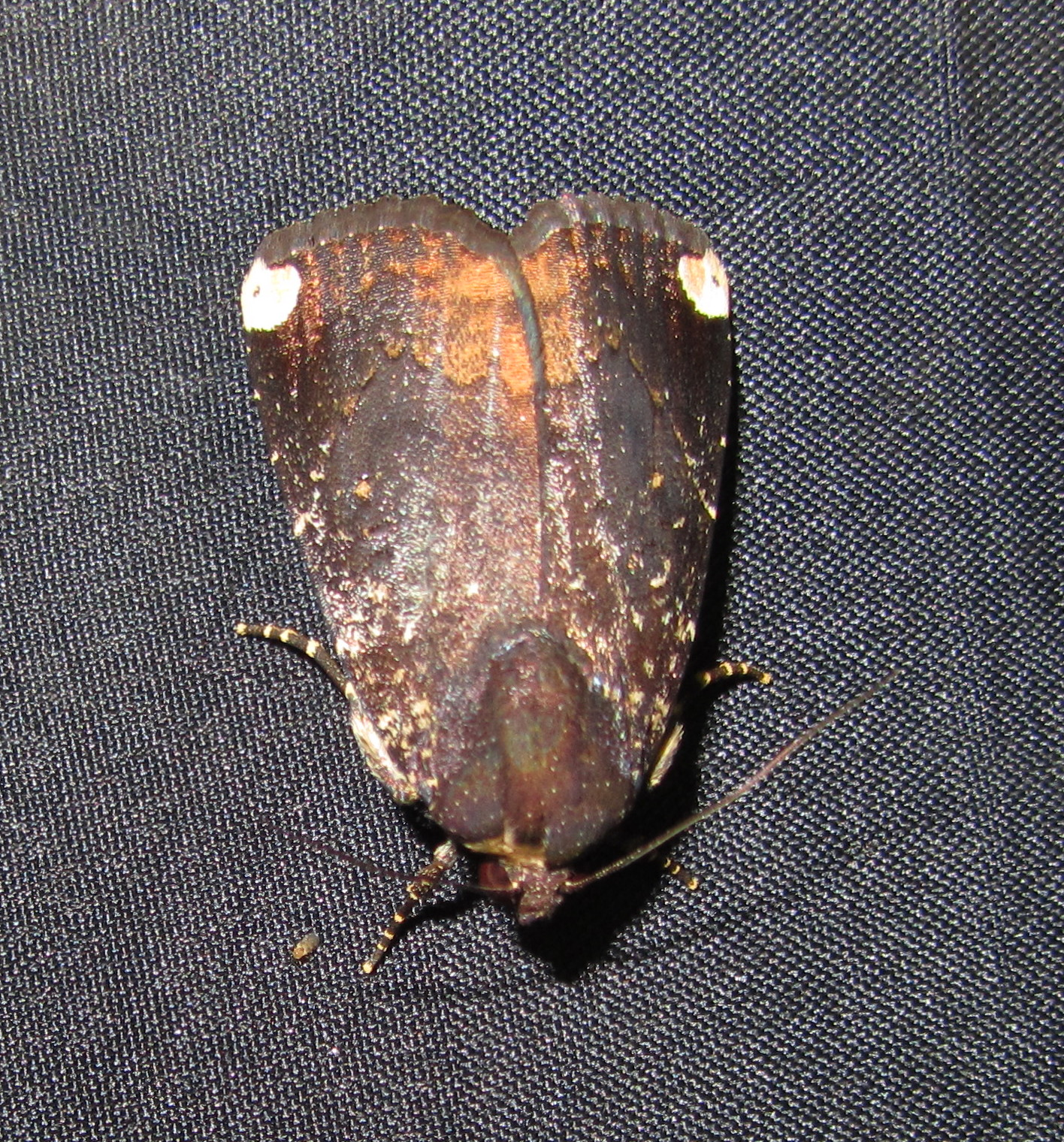
Callyna monoleuca

==== Bryophilinae ====
- Cryphia postochrea (Hampson, 1893)

==== Catocalinae ====
- Aedia leucomelas (Linnaeus, 1758)
- Amphigonia hepatizans Guenée, 1852
- Anticarsia irrorata (Fabricius, 1781)
- Arcte coerula (Guenée, 1852)
- Arcte taprobana Moore, 1885
- Arsacia rectalis (Walker, 1863)
- Artena dotata (Fabricius, 1794)
- Attatha regalis (Moore, 1872)
- Avitta ophiusalis Walker, [1859]
- Avitta quadrilinea Walker, [1863]
- Avitta rufifrons Moore, [1887]
- Avitta subsignans Walker, 1858
- Blasticorhinus rivulosa (Walker, 1865)
- Chalciope mygdon (Cramer, 1777)
- Chrysopera combinans Walker, 1858
- Entomogramma fautrix Guenée, 1852
- Entomogramma torsa Guenée, 1852
- Ischyja manlia (Cramer, 1776)
- Macaldenia palumba (Guenée, 1852)
- Oxyodes scrobiculata (Fabricius, 1775)
- Pindara illibata (Fabricius, 1775)
- Platyja umminia (Cramer, [1780])
- Psimada quadripennis Walker, 1858
- Sympis rufibasis Guenée, 1852

==== Condicinae ====
- Bagada spicea (Guenée, 1852)
- Condica dolorosa (Walker, 1865)
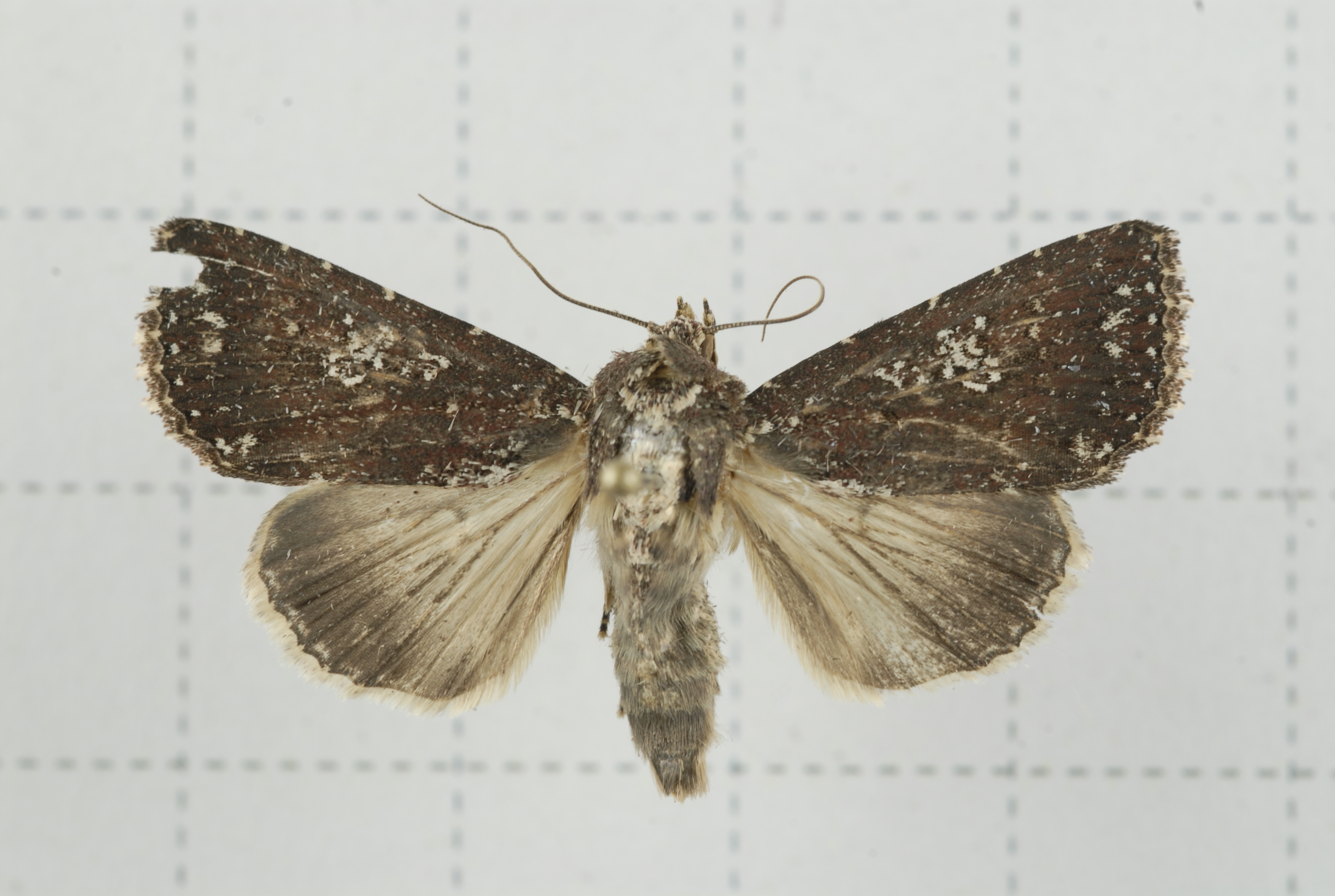
Condica dolorosa

==== Eustrotiinae ====
- Amyna axis Guenée, 1852
- Amyna natalis (Walker, 1859)
- Amyna punctum (Fabricius, 1775)
- Naranga diffusa Walker, 1865
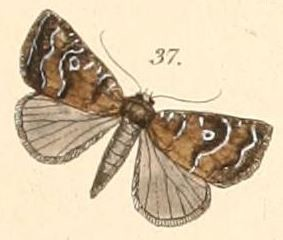
Amyna axis

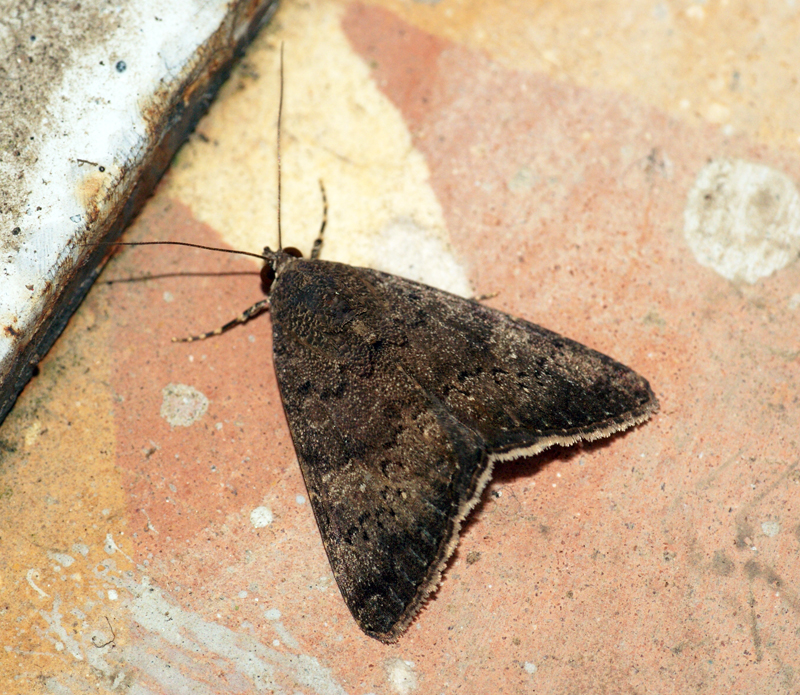
Amyna punctum

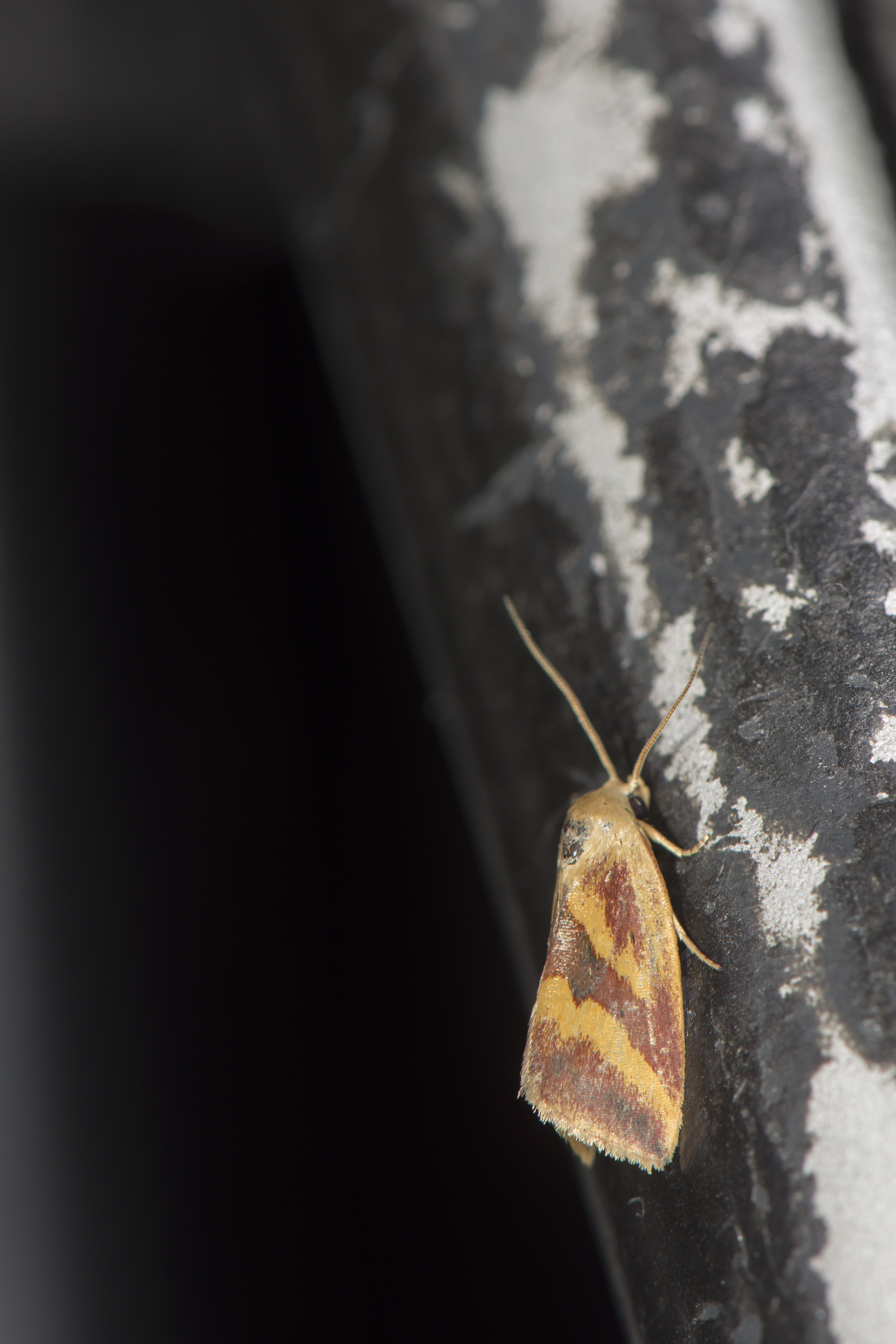
Naranga diffusa

==== Euteliinae ====
- Anigraea cinctipalpis (Walker, 1865)
- Anuga constricta Guenée, 1852
- Anuga multiplicans (Walker, 1858)
- Chlumetia transversa (Walker, 1863)
- Eutelia approximata Walker, [1863] 1864
- Eutelia favillatrix (Guenée, 1852)
- Eutelia geyeri (Felder & Rogenhofer, 1874)
- Penicillaria jocosatrix Guenée, 1852
- Penicillaria lineatrix Walker, 1858
- Penicillaria ludatrix (Walker, 1858)
- Penicillaria nugatrix Guenée, 1852
- Targalla bifacies (Walker, 1858)
- Targalla repleta (Walker, 1865)
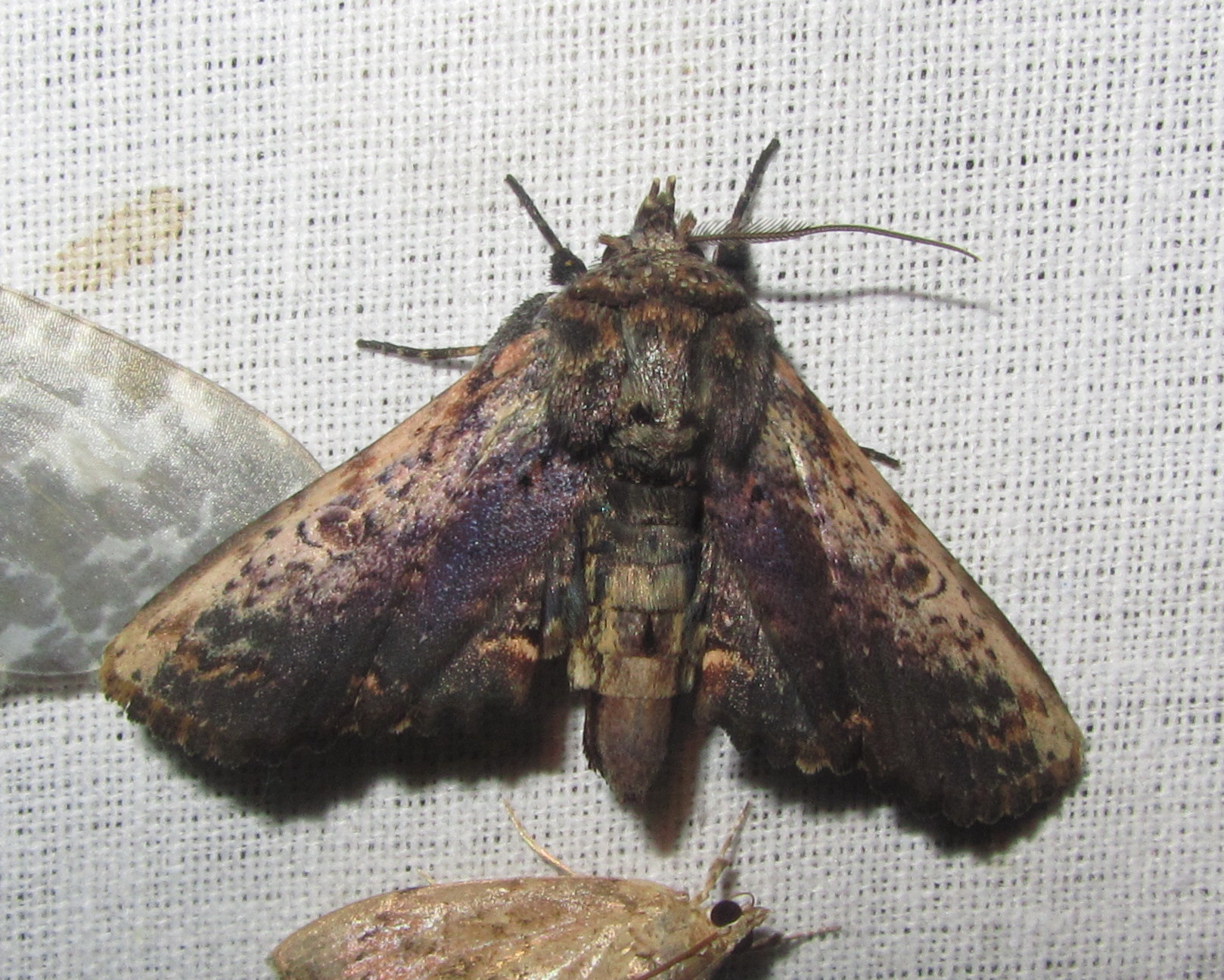
Anuga multiplicans

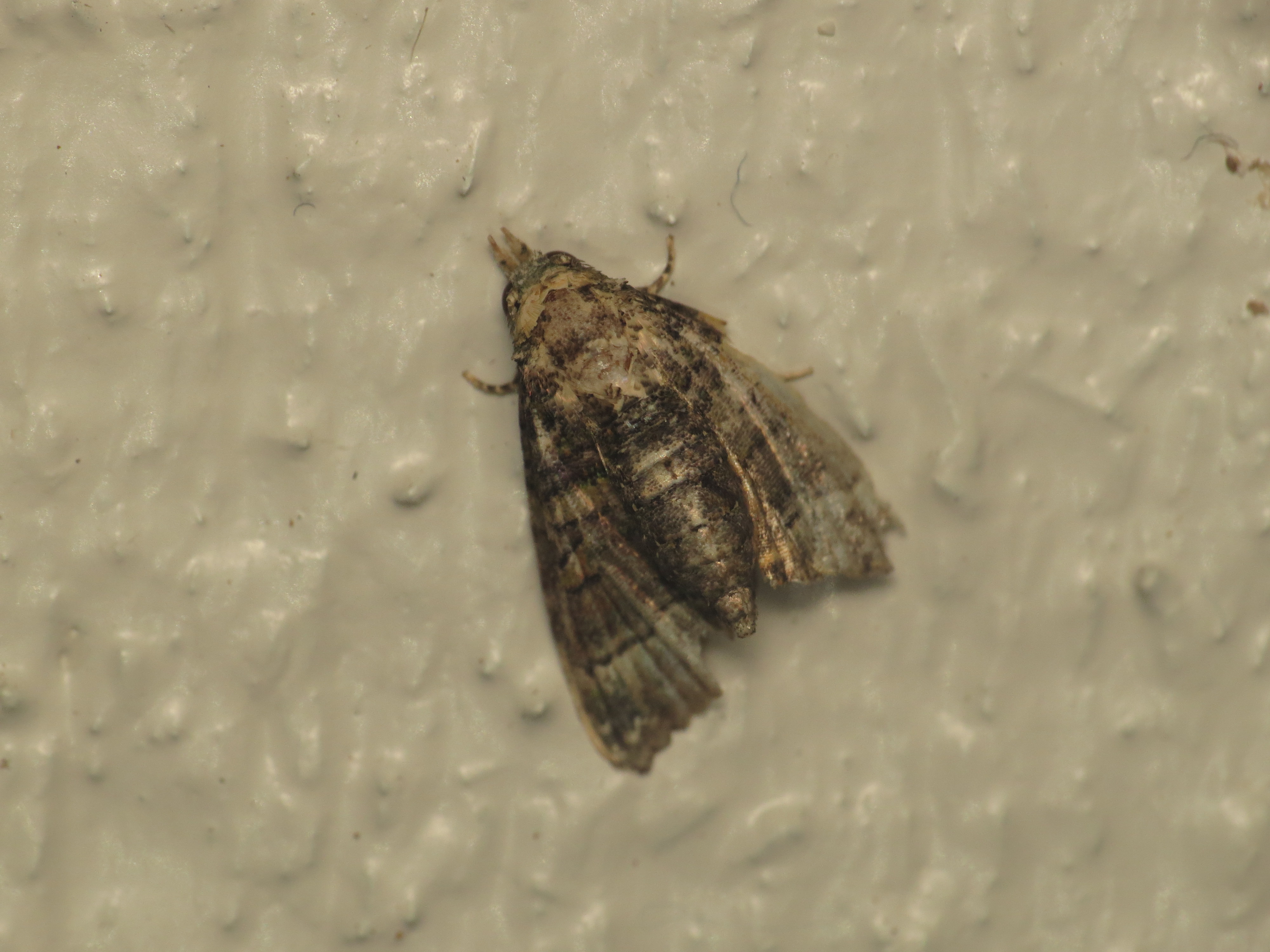
Chlumetia transversa

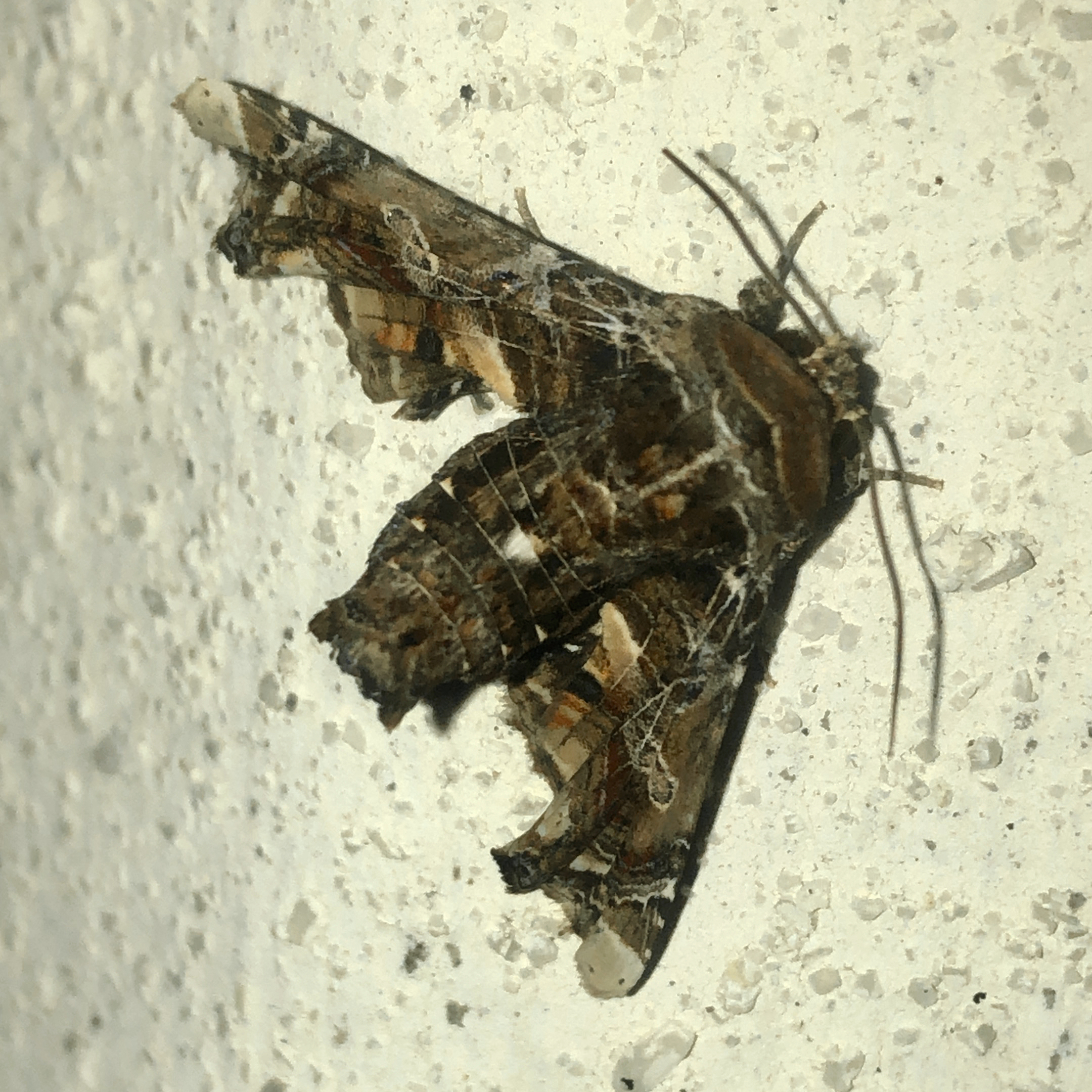
Eutelia geyeri

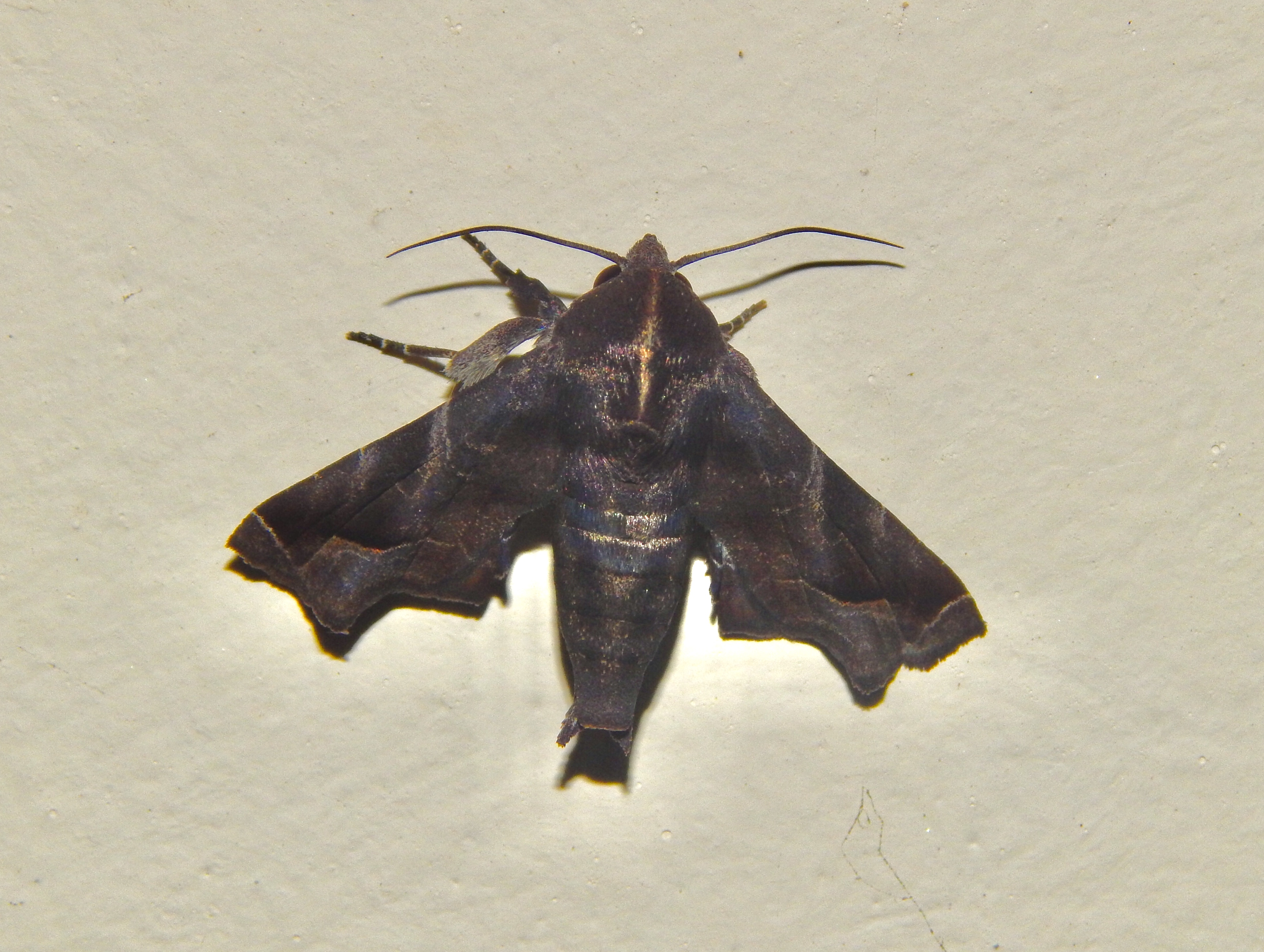
Penicillaria jocosatrix

==== Hadeninae - hants moths ====
- Actinotia intermediata (Bremer, 1861)
- Apospasta pannosa (Moore, 1881)
- Callopistria apicalis (Walker, 1855)
- Callopistria maillardi Guénée, 1862
- Callopistria rivularis Walker, 1858
- Callopistria thalpophiloides (Walker, 1862)
- Chasmina candida (Walker, 1865)
- Chasmina fasciculosa Walker, 1858
- Conservula v-brunneum (Guenée, 1852)
- Corythurus nocturnus Hampson, 1893
- Dictyestra dissectus (Walker, 1865)
- Dypterygia cristifera Hampson, 1893
- Elusa subjecta (Walker, 1865)
- Euplexia albonota Hampson, 1893
- Feliniopsis indistans Guenée, 1852
- Feliniopsis opposita (Walker, 1865)
- Hadula trifolii (Hufnagel, 1766)
- Leucania loreyi (Duponchel, 1827)
- Leucania roseilinea Walker, 1862
- Leucania venalba Moore, 1867
- Leucania yu Guenée, 1852
- Mudaria albonotata (Hampson, 1893)
- Mudaria fisherae Prout, 1928
- Mudaria leprosticta (Hampson, 1907)
- Mythimna consanguis Guenée, 1852
- Mythimna decisissima Walker, 1856
- Mythimna denticula (Hampson, 1893)
- Mythimna irrorata (Moore, 1881)
- Mythimna hamifera Walker, 1862
- Mythimna obscura Moore, 1882
- Mythimna pallidicosta (Hampson, 1894)
- Mythimna reversa Moore, 1884
- Mythimna separata Walker, 1865
- Paradiopa postfusca (Hampson, 1893)
- Paradrina clavipalpis (Scopoli, 1763)
- Sasunaga tenebrosa (Moore, 1867)
- Sesamia inferens (Walker, 1856)
- Spodoptera apertura (Walker, 1865)
- Spodoptera exigua (Hübner, 1808)
- Spodoptera frugiperda (J.E. Smith, 1797)
- Spodoptera litura (Fabricius, 1775)
- Spodoptera mauritia (Boisduval, 1833)
- Spodoptera picta (Guérin-Méneville, [1838])
- Stenopterygia subcurva (Walker, 1857)
- Tiracola plagiata (Walker, 1857)
- Trachea melanospila Kollar, 1844
- Xylostola indistincta (Moore, 1882)
- Yepcalphis dilectissima (Walker, 1858)

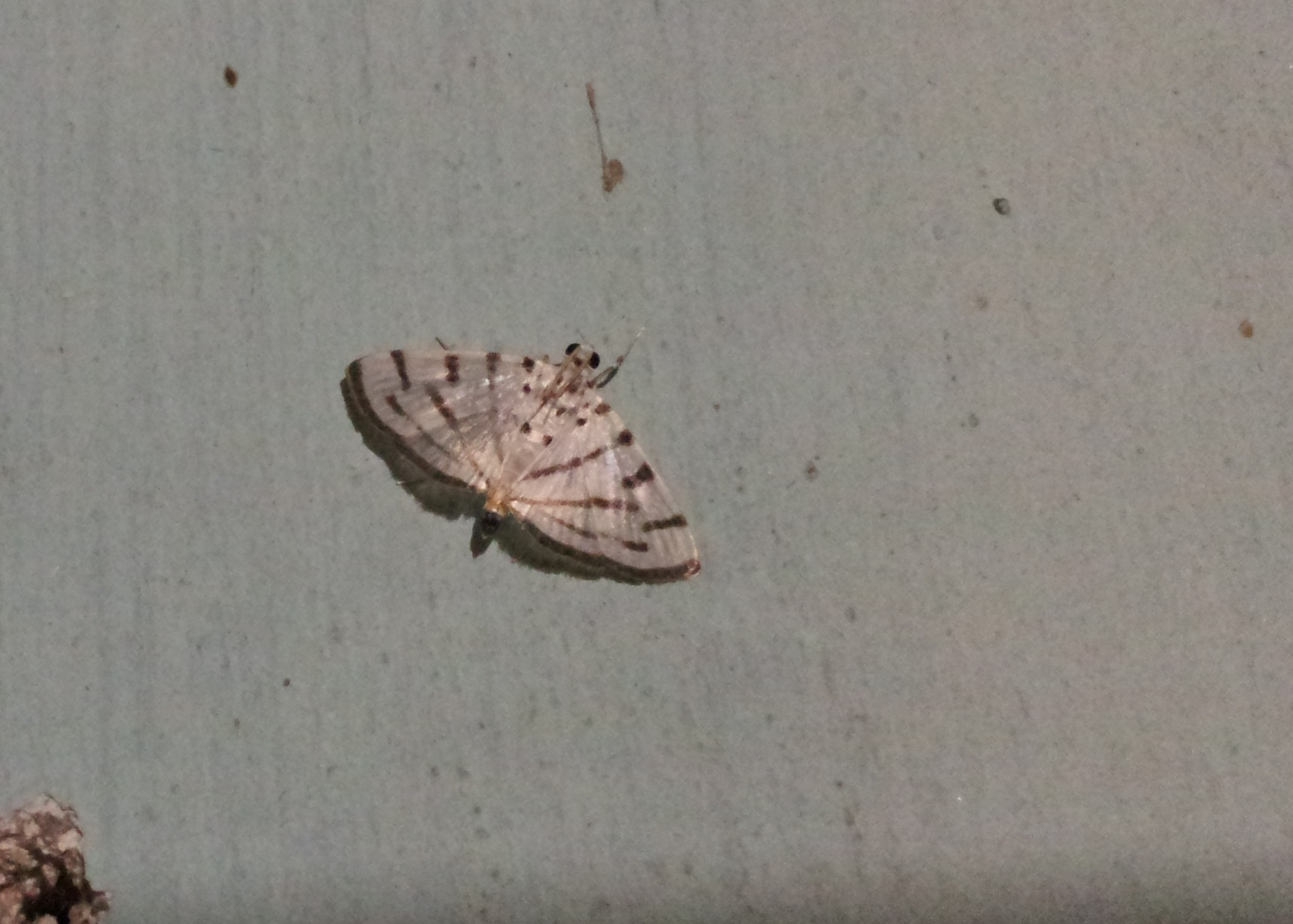

==== Noctuinae ====
- Agrotis segetum Denis & Schiffermüller, 1775
- Agrotis spinifera Hübner, 1808
- Agrotis ipsilon (Hufnagel, 1766)
- Diarsia ochracea (Walker, 1865)
- Ochropleura plecta Linnaeus, 1761
- Oroplexia retrahens Walker, 1856
- Xestia c-nigrum (Linnaeus, 1758)
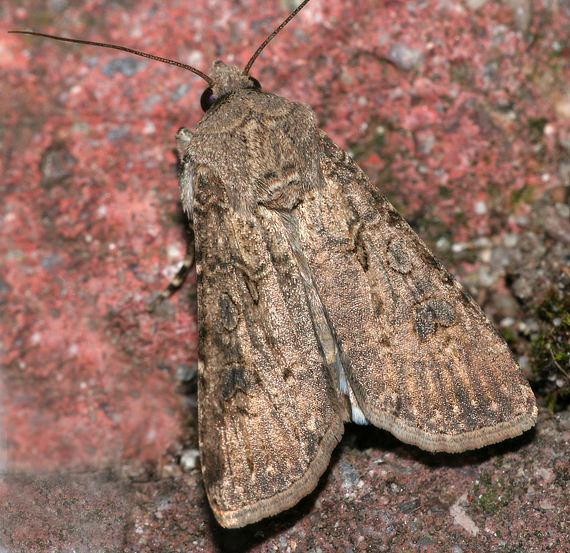
Agrotis segetum

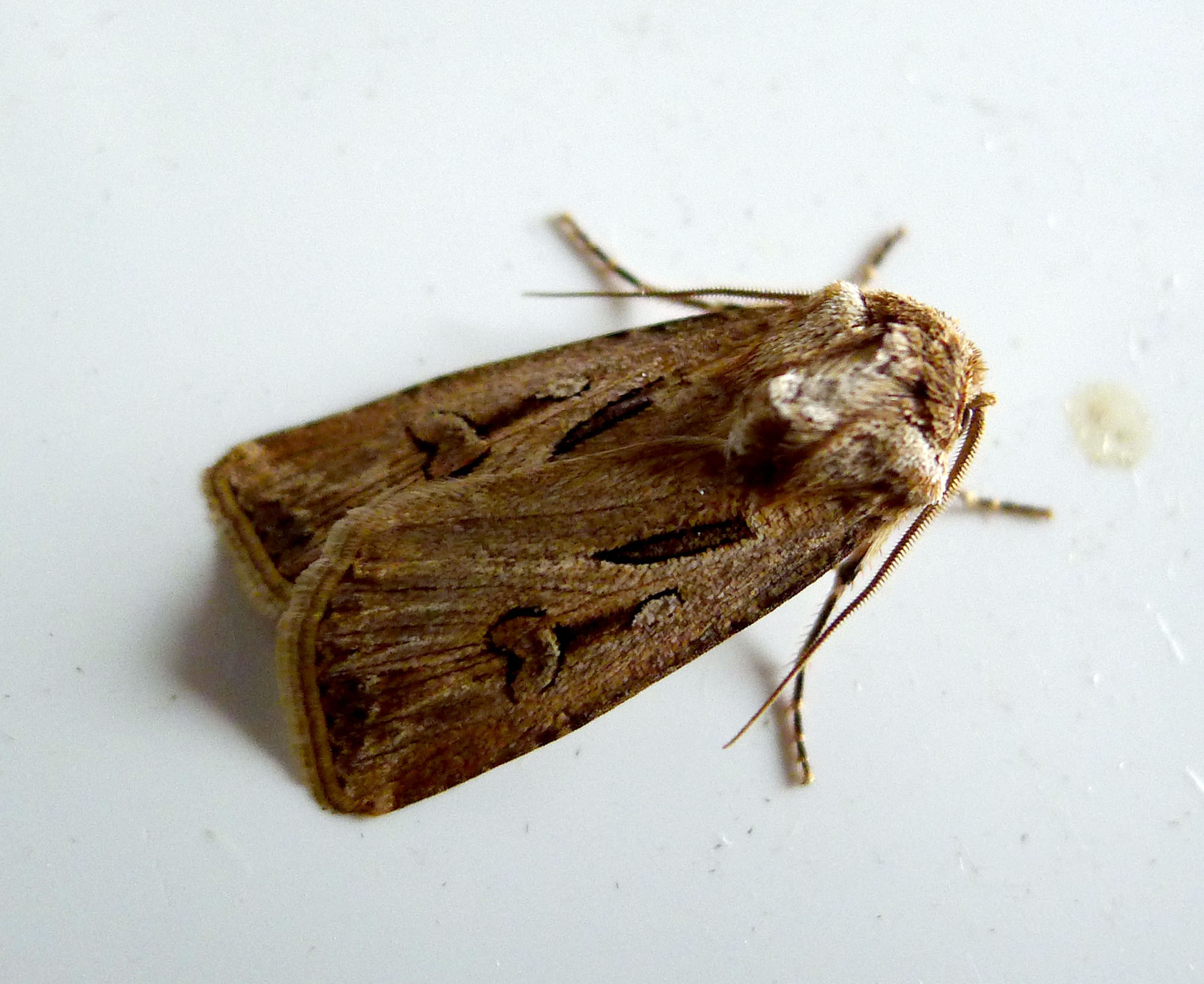
Agrotis spinifera

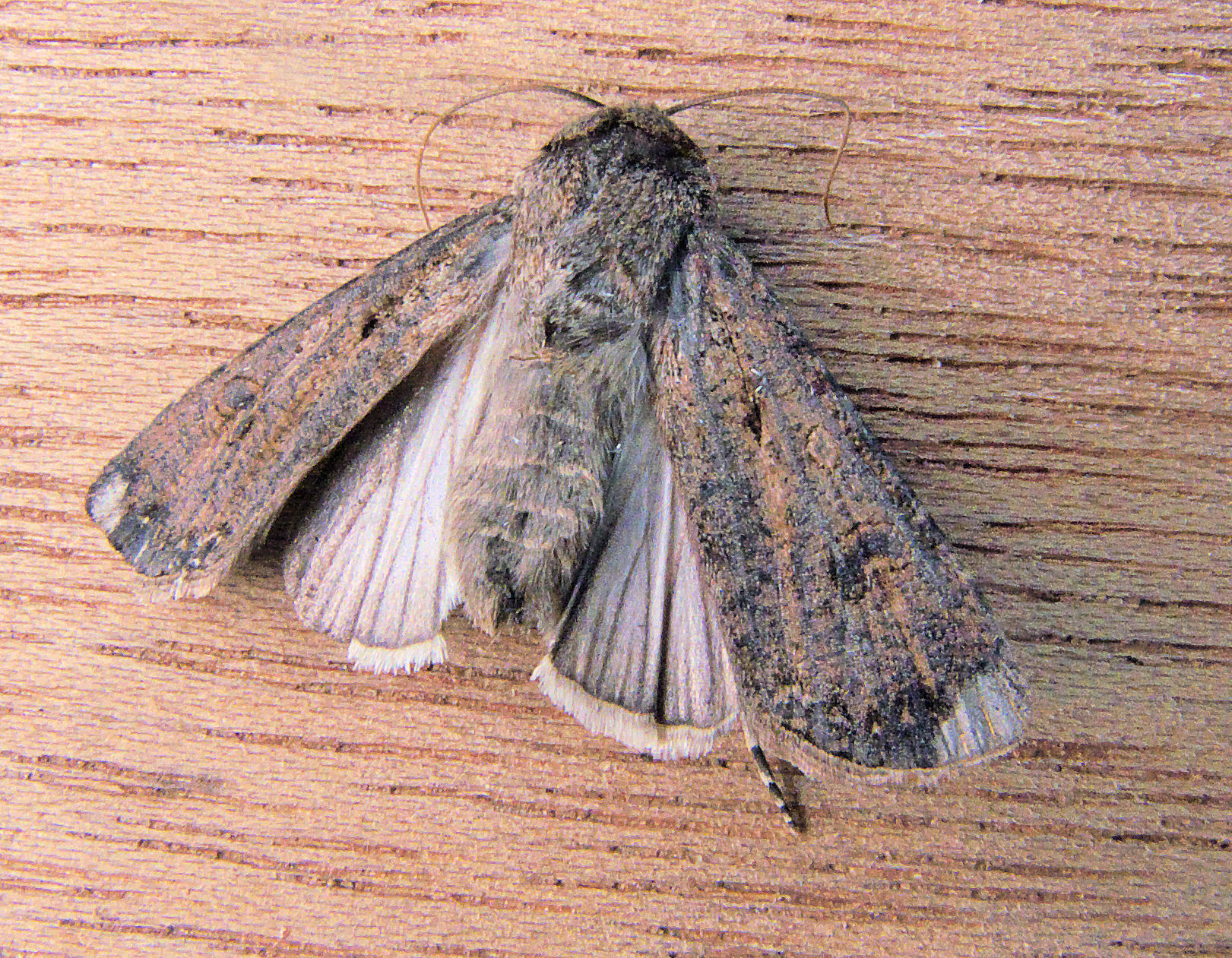
Agrotis ipsilon

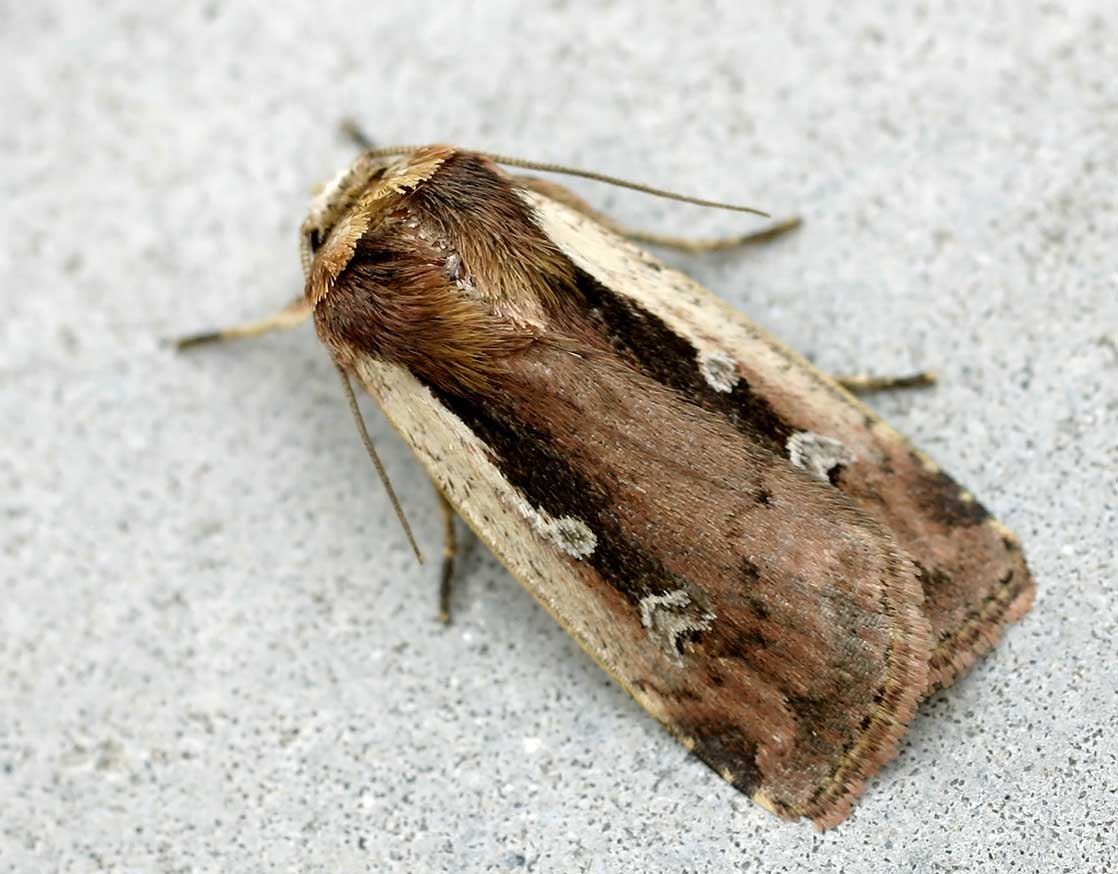
Ochropleura plecta

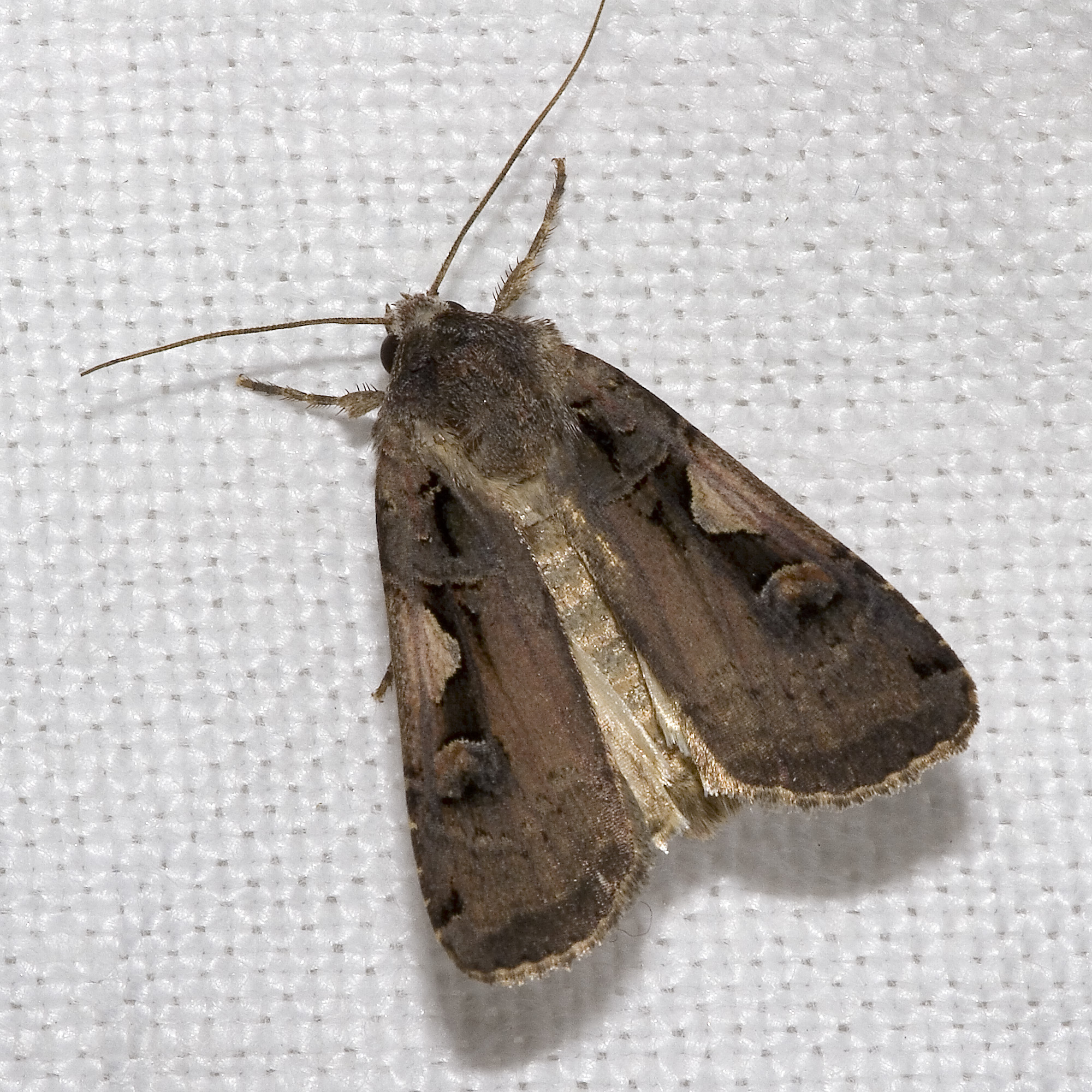
Xestia.c-nigrum

==== Pantheinae ====
- Trichosea champa (Moore, 1879)
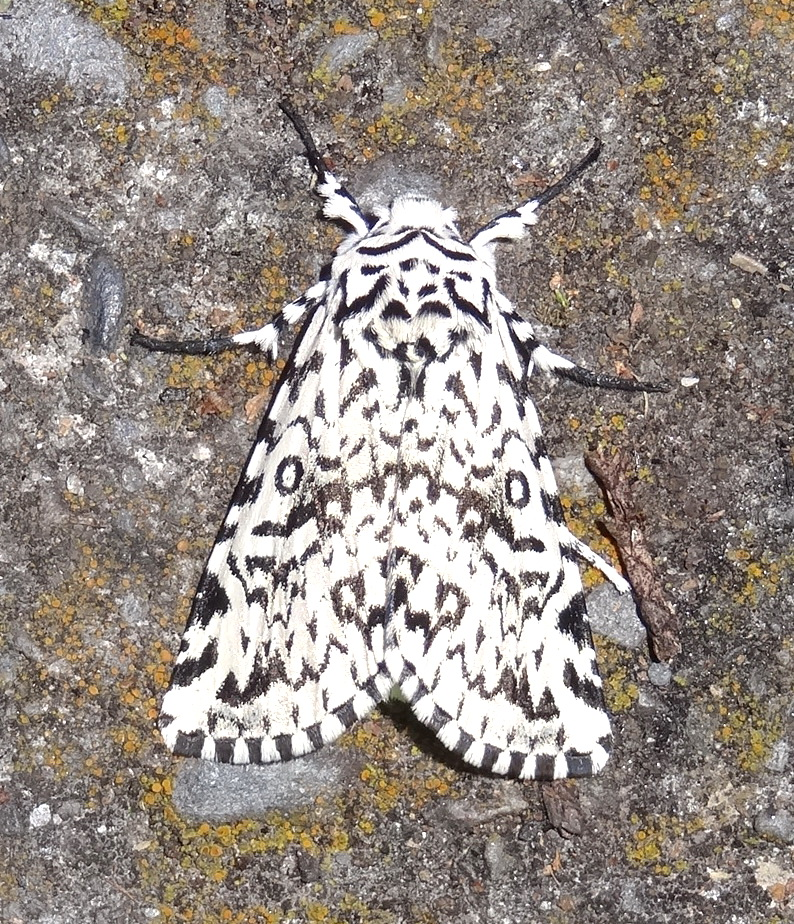
Trichosea champa

==== Plusiinae - looper moths ====
- Anadevidia peponis (Fabricius, 1775)
- Argyrogramma signata Fabricius, 1794
- Chrysodeixis eriosoma (Doubleday, 1843)
- Ctenoplusia albostriata (Bremer & Grey, 1853)
- Ctenoplusia fracta Walker, [1858]
- Ctenoplusia limbirena (Guenée, 1852)
- Dactyloplusia impulsa Walker, 1865
- Scriptoplusia nigriluna Walker, [1858]
- Trichoplusia lectula (Walker, 1858)
- Trichoplusia ni (Hübner, 1800–1803)
- Trichoplusia obtusisigna Walker, 1858
- Thysanoplusia orichalcea (Fabricius, 1775)
- Zonoplusia ochreata (Walker, 1865)
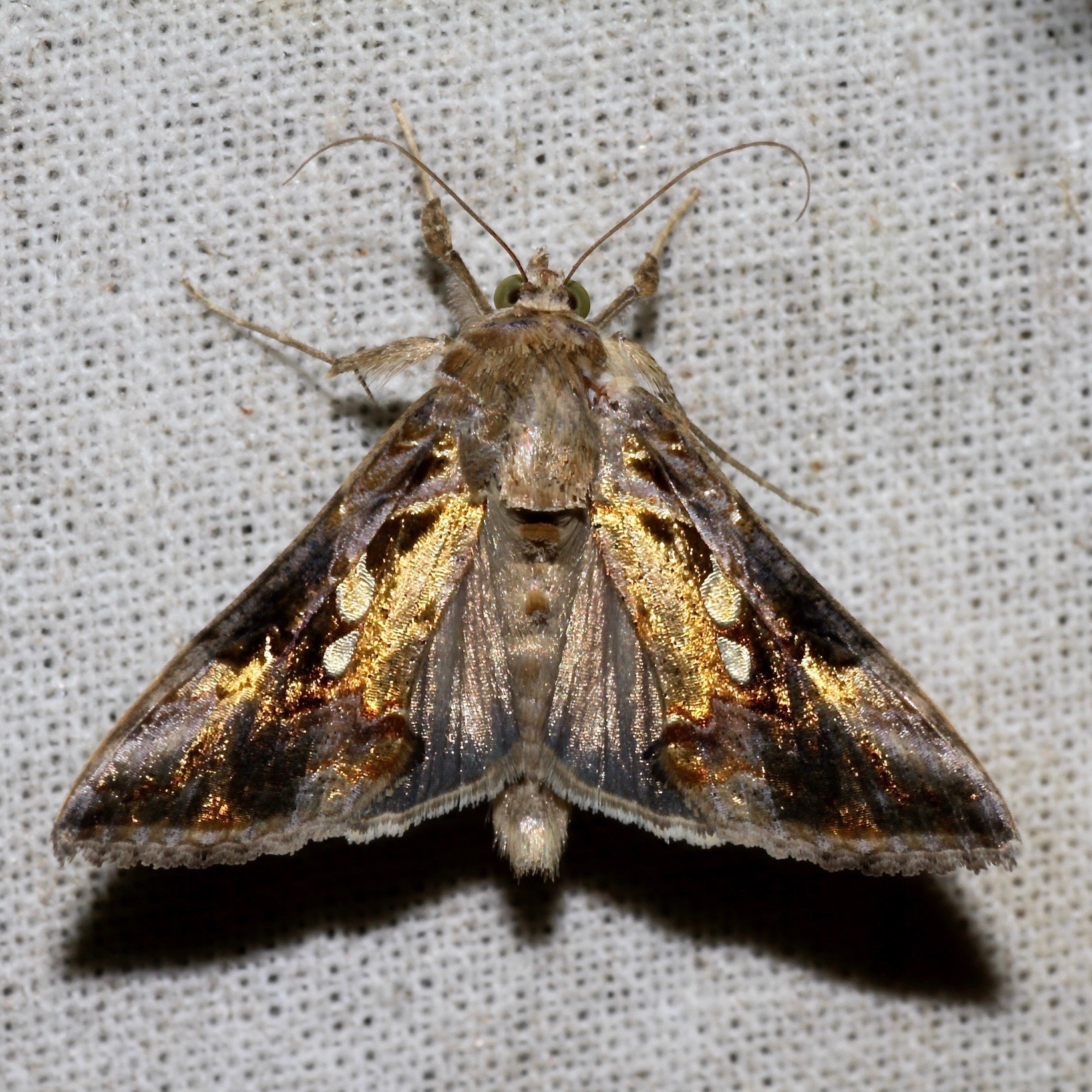
Argyrogramma signata

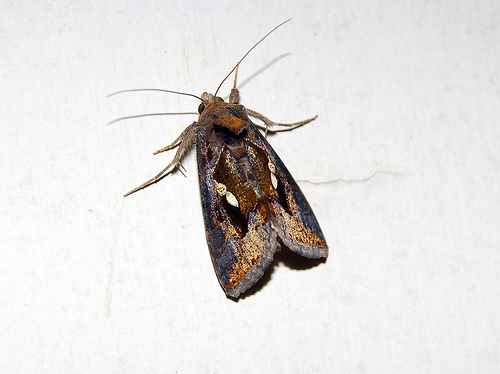
Chrysodeixis eriosoma

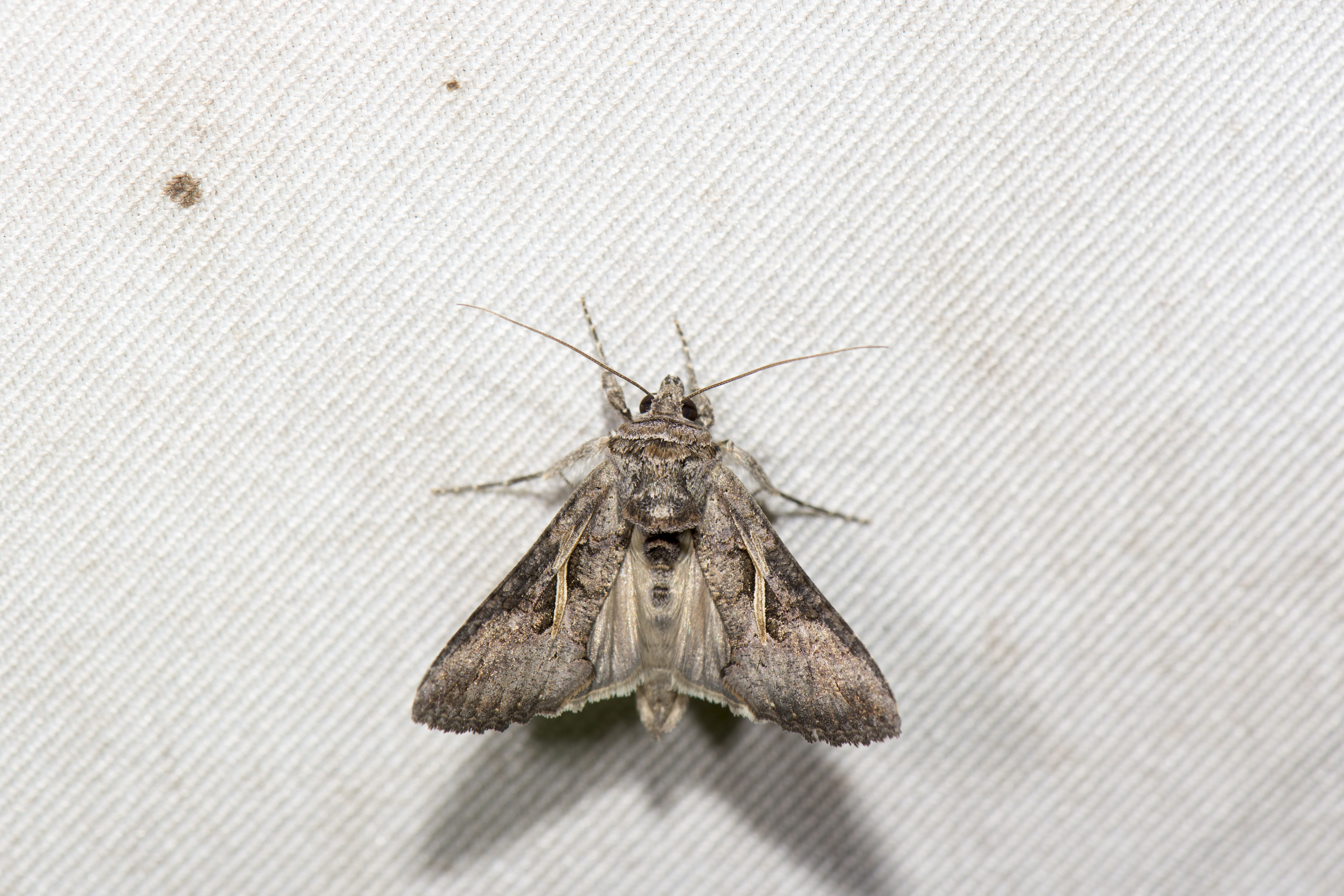
Ctenoplusia albostriata

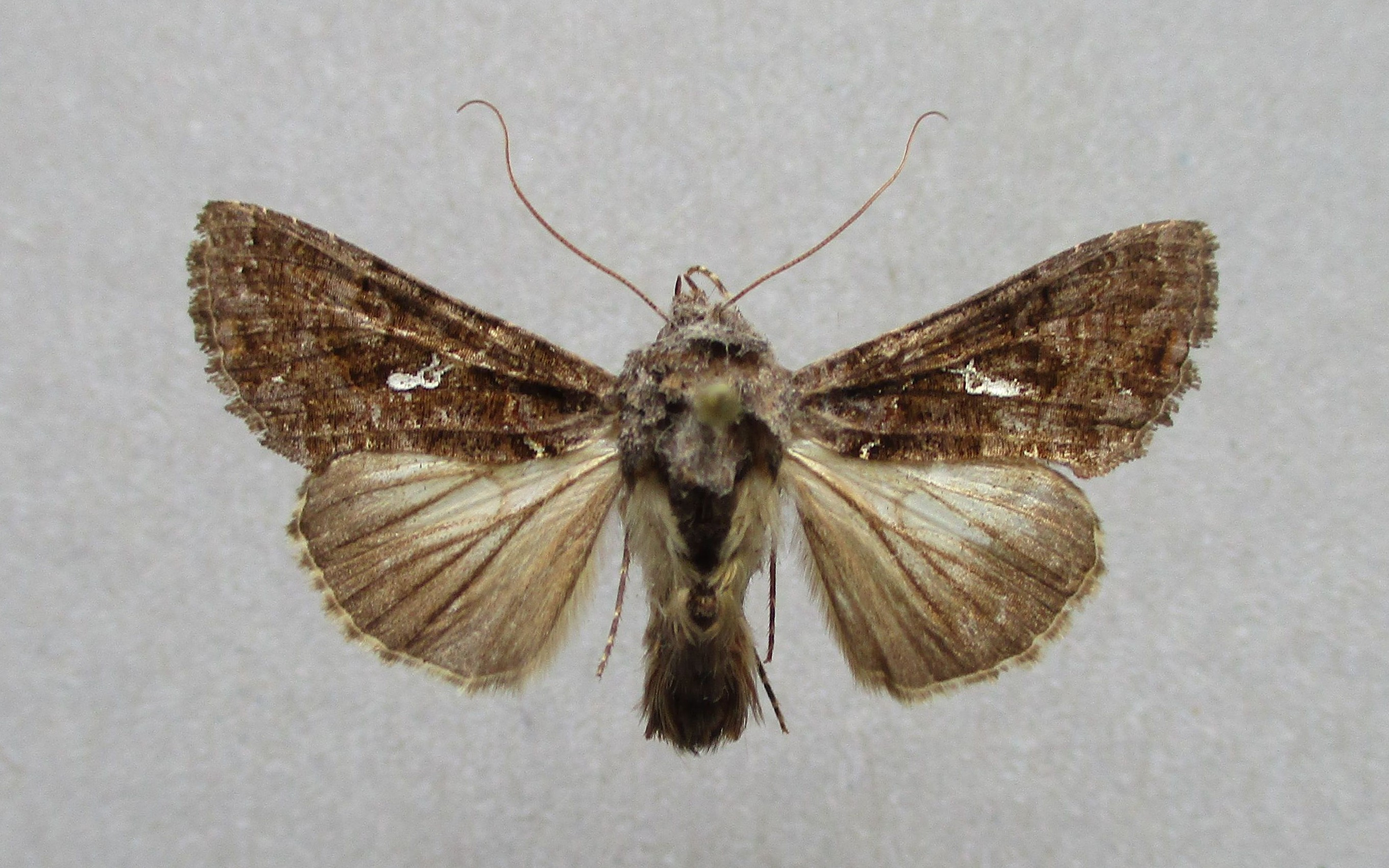
Ctenoplusia limbirena

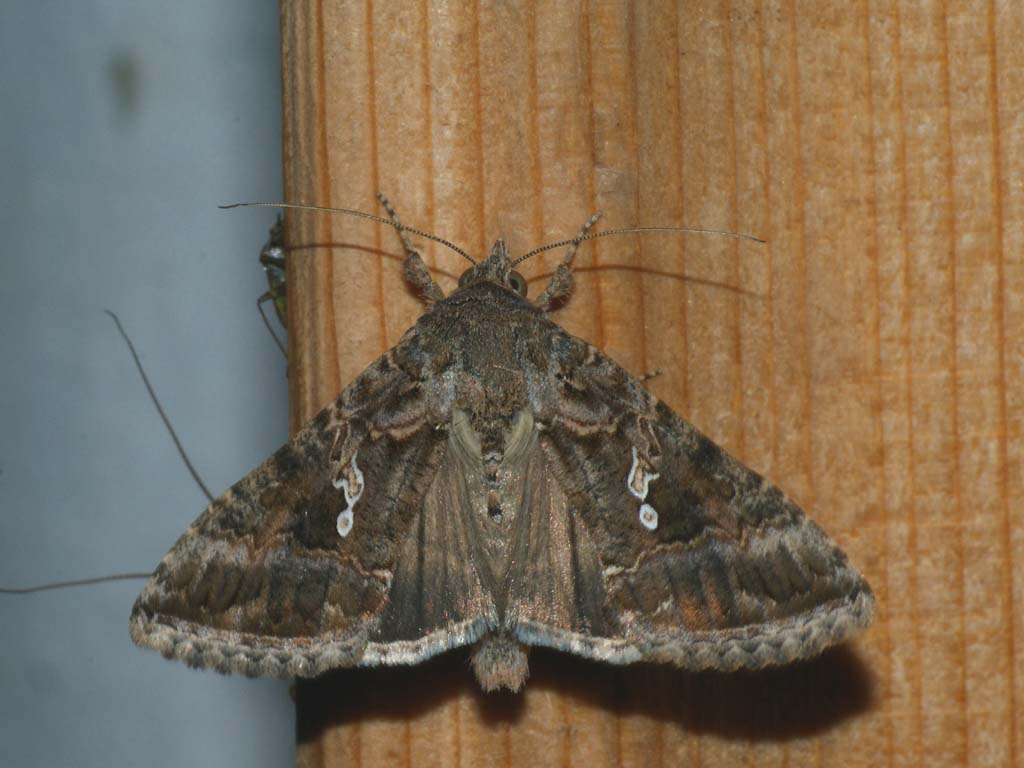
Trichoplusia ni

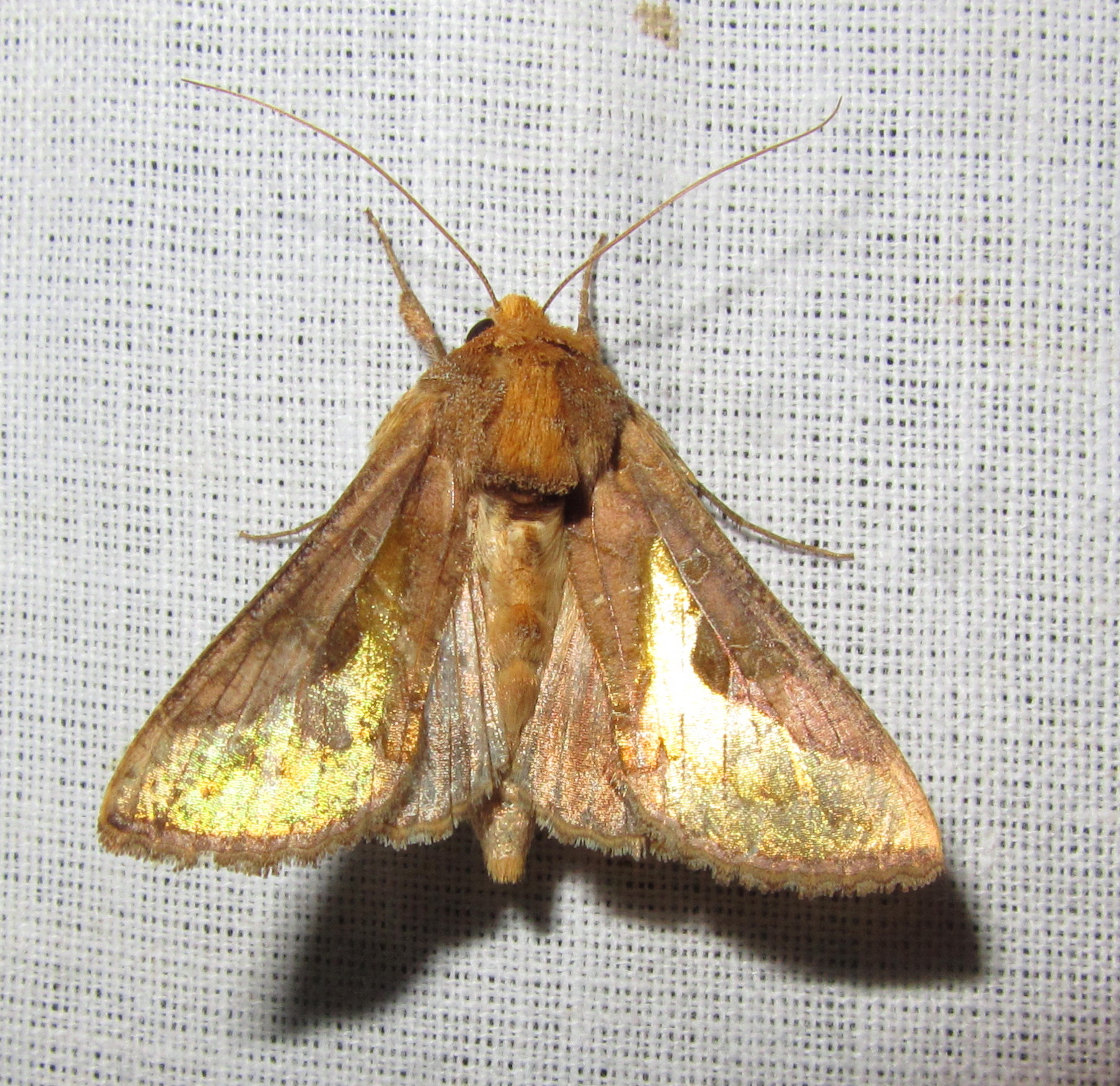
Thysanoplusia orichalcea

==== Stictopterinae ====
- Aegilia describens (Walker, [1858])
- Gyrtona hylusalis Walker, 1863
- Lophoptera squammigera Guenée, 1852
- Stictoptera cucullioides Guenée, 1852
- Stictoptera trajiciens (Walker, 1857)
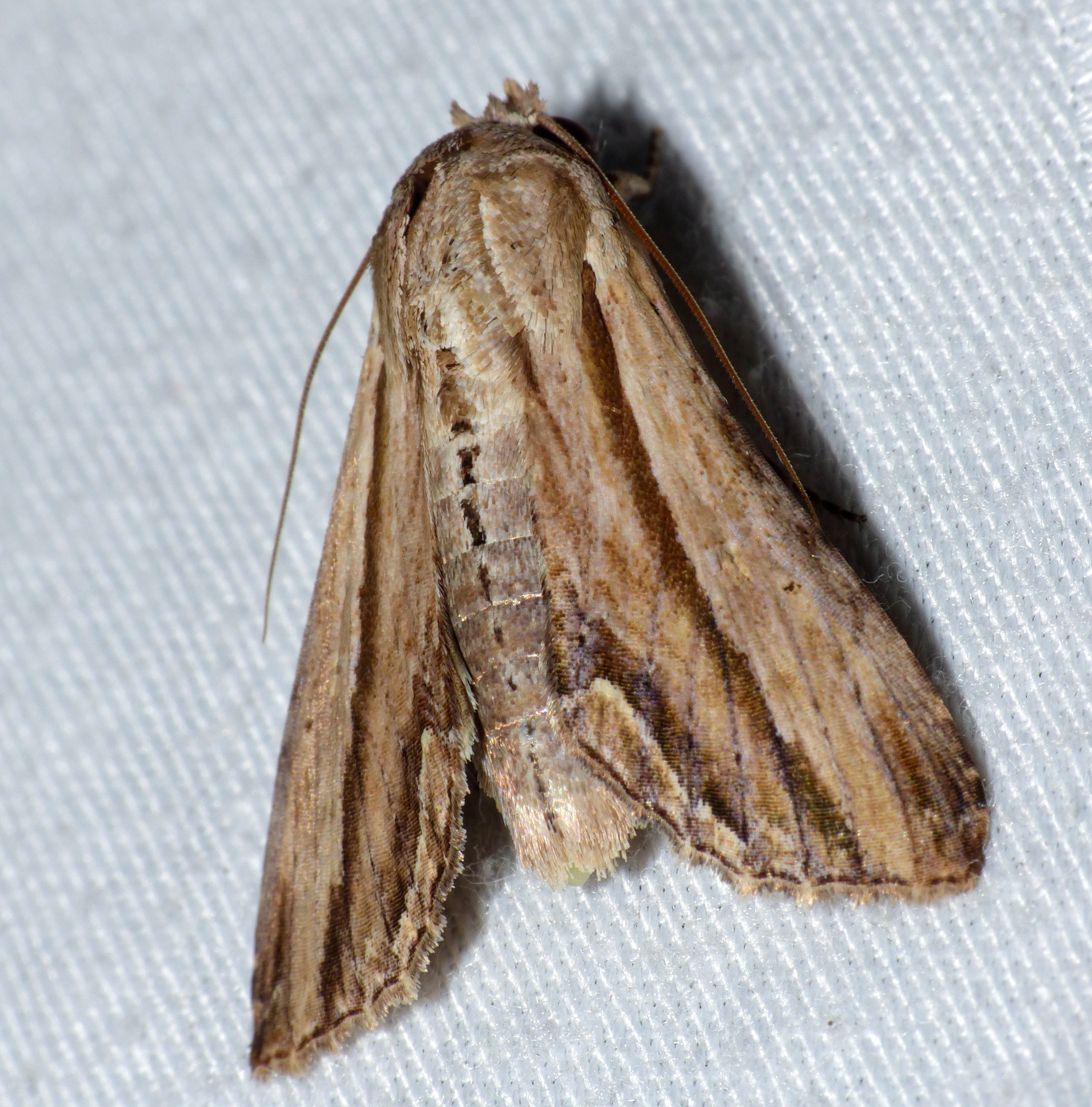
Aegilia describens

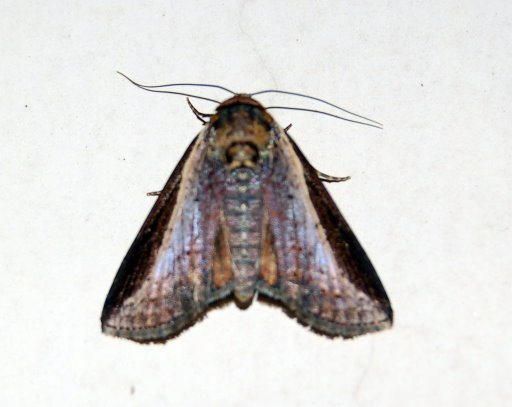
Lophoptera squammigera

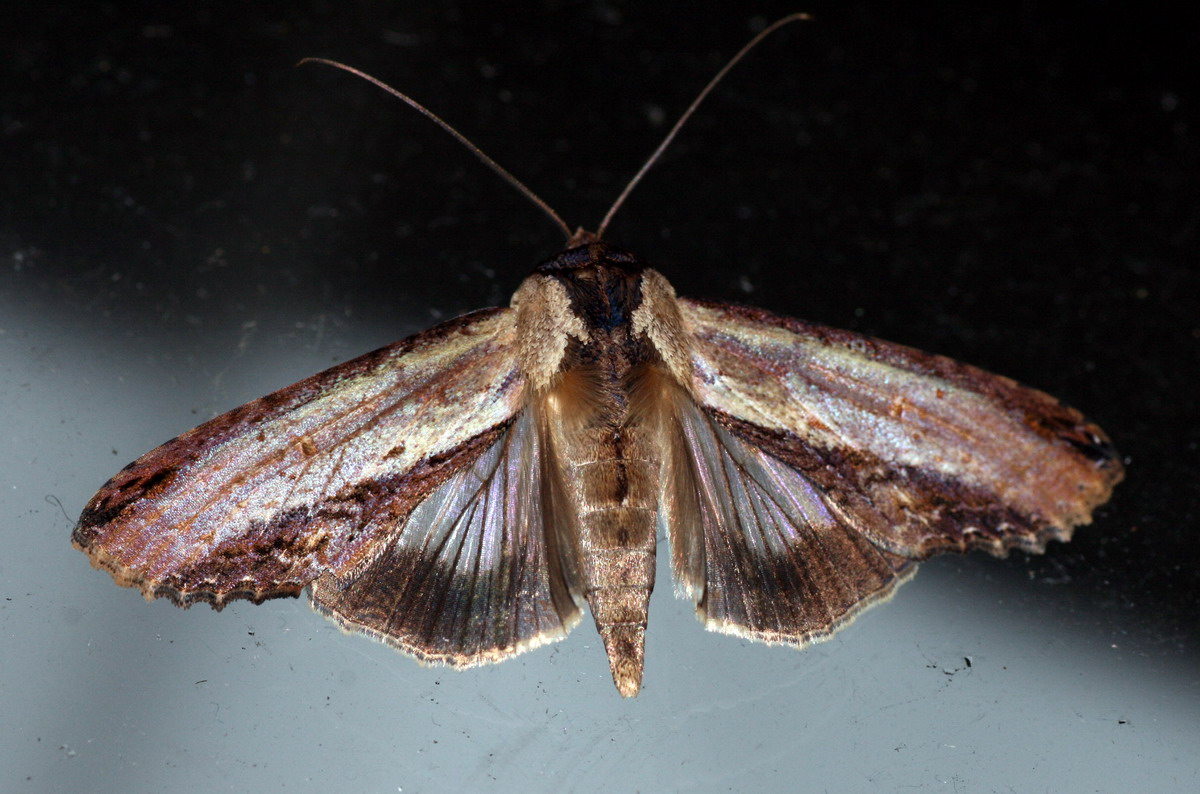
Stictoptera cuculloides

==== Tinoliinae ====
- Poeta quadrinotata Walker, 1865

==== Toxocampinae ====
- Lygephila dorsigera Walker, 1865

==== Xyleninae ====
- Acrapex hamulifera (Hampson, 1893)
- Acrapex prisca (Walker, 1866)

=== Nolidae - nolid moths ===
- Aiteta apriformis Walker, 1857
- Aiteta damnipennis Walker, 1865
- Aiteta truncata Walker, 1858
- Aquis orbicularis (Walker, 1858)
- Aquita acontioides (Walker, 1862)
- Barasa acronyctoides Walker, 1862
- Beara dichromella Walker, 1866
- Beana terminigera (Walker, 1858)
- Blenina accipiens Walker, [1858]
- Blenina chlorophila Hampson, 1905
- Blenina donans Walker, 1857
- Carea angulata (Fabricius, 1793)
- Carea obsolescens Moore, 1884
- Carea varipes Walker, 1856 [1857]
- Cacyparis insolitata Walker 1862
- Churia maculata Moore, 1881
- Earias cupreoviridis (Walker, 1862)
- Earias fabia Stoll 1781
- Earias flavida Felder, [1861]
- Earias luteolaria Hampson, 1891
- Eligma narcissus (Cramer, 1775)
- Etanna basalis (Moore, 1885)
- Giaura tortricoides Walker, 1865
- Inouenola grisalis (Hampson, 1893)
- Labanda chloromela Walker, 1858
- Labanda fasciata Walker, 1865
- Labanda herbealis Walker, 1859
- Labanda saturalis Walker, 1865
- Labanda semipars (Walker, 1858)
- Lasiolopha saturata (Walker, 1865)
- Lophothripa vitea Swinhoe, 1885
- Maceda mansueta Walker, 1858
- Manoba major Hampson, 1891
- Maurilia iconica Walker, 1857 [1858]
- Meganola brunellus (Hampson, 1893)
- Nanaguna breviuscula Walker, 1863
- Negeta contrariata Walker, 1862
- Nola analis (Wileman & West, 1928)
- Nola angulata (Moore, 1888)
- Nola ceylonica Hampson, 1893
- Nola cingalesa Moore, 1882
- Nola dentilinea (Hampson, 1909)
- Nola fasciata (Walker, 1866)
- Nola fuscibasalis (Bethune-Baker, 1904)
- Nola leucoscopula (Hampson, 1907)
- Nola lucidalis Walker, 1864
- Nola mesotherma Hampson, 1909
- Nola pascua (Swinhoe, 1885)
- Nola rufa (Hampson, 1900)
- Nola rufimixta (Hampson, 1909)
- Nola streptographia (Hampson, 1900)
- Nola squalida Staudinger, 1871
- Nola tumulifera Hampson, 1893
- Nycteola indica (Felder, 1874)
- Nycteola indicatana (Walker, 1863)
- Nycteola poliophaea (Hampson, 1907)
- Paracrama dulcissima (Walker, 1864)
- Plotheia decrescens (Walker, [1858])
- Pterogonia aurigutta (Walker, 1858)
- Pterogonia nubes (Hampson, 1893)
- Ptisciana seminivea Walker, 1865
- Risoba repugnans (Walker, 1856)
- Risoba obstructa Moore, 1881
- Risoba prominens Moore, 1881
- Selepa celtis Moore, [1860]
- Selepa discigera (Walker, [1863])
- Selepa plumbeata Hampson, 1912
- Xanthodes intersepta Guenée, 1852
- Xanthodes transversa Guenée, 1852
- Xenochroa chlorostigma (Hampson, 1893)
- Westermannia superba Hübner, 1823

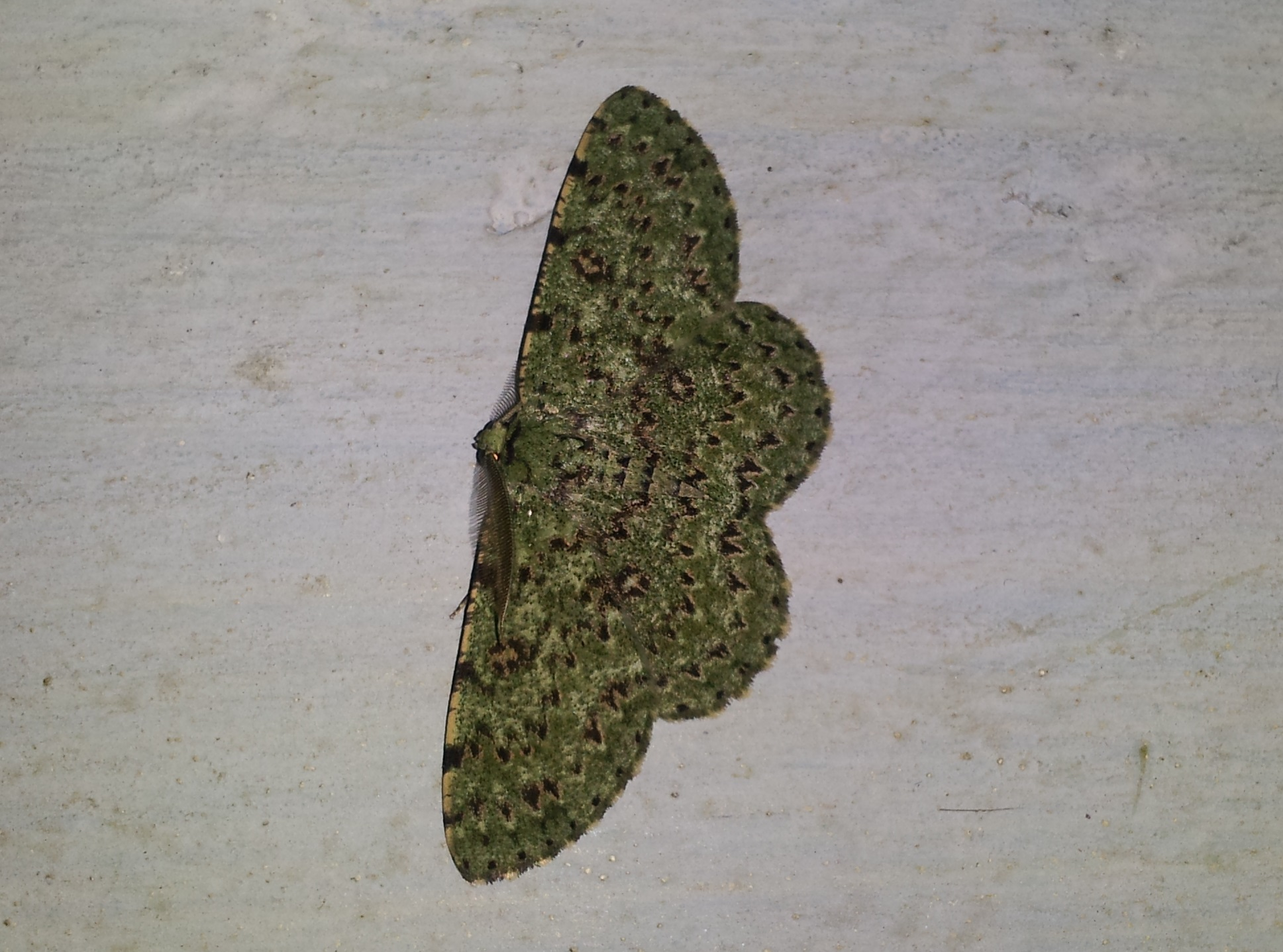
Ophthalmitis herbidaria

=== Notodontidae - prominent moths ===
- Antheua servula (Drury, 1773)
- Cerura liturata (Walker, 1855)
- Chadisra bipars Walker, 1862
- Clostera restitura (Walker, 1865)
- Hyperaeschrella dentata Hampson, 1892
- Clostera anachoreta Fabricius
- Netria viridescens Walker, 1855
- Norraca longipennis (Moore, 1881)
- Phalera grotei Moore, 1859
- Phycidopsis albovittata Hampson, 1893
- Ramesa tosta Walker, 1855
- Somera viridifusca Walker, 1855
- Sphetta apicalis Walker, 1865
- Stauropus alternus (Walker, 1855)
- Stauropus dentilinea Hampson
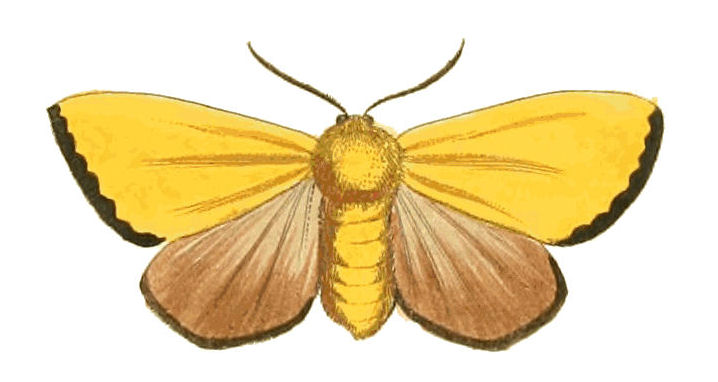
Antheua servula

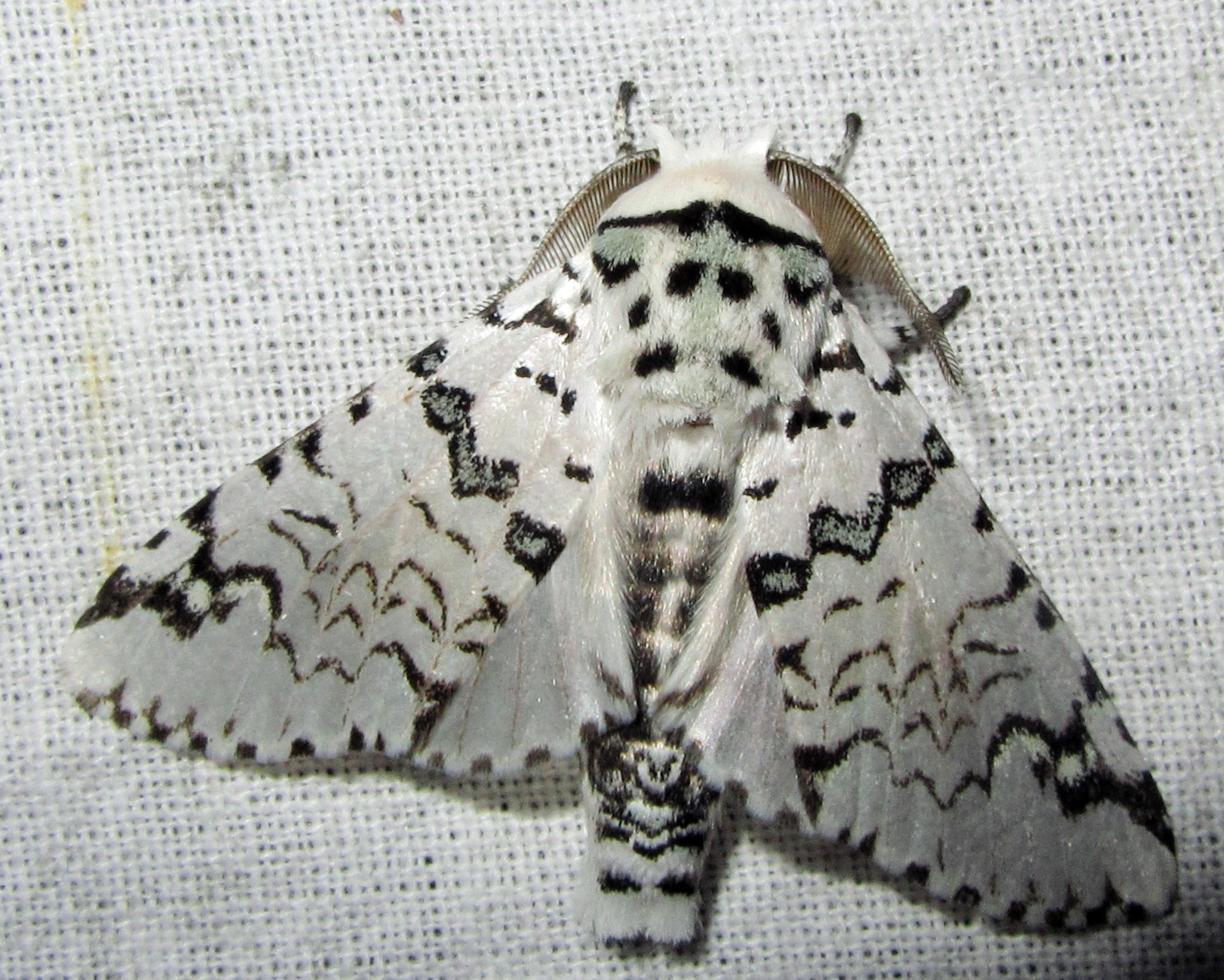
Cerura liturata

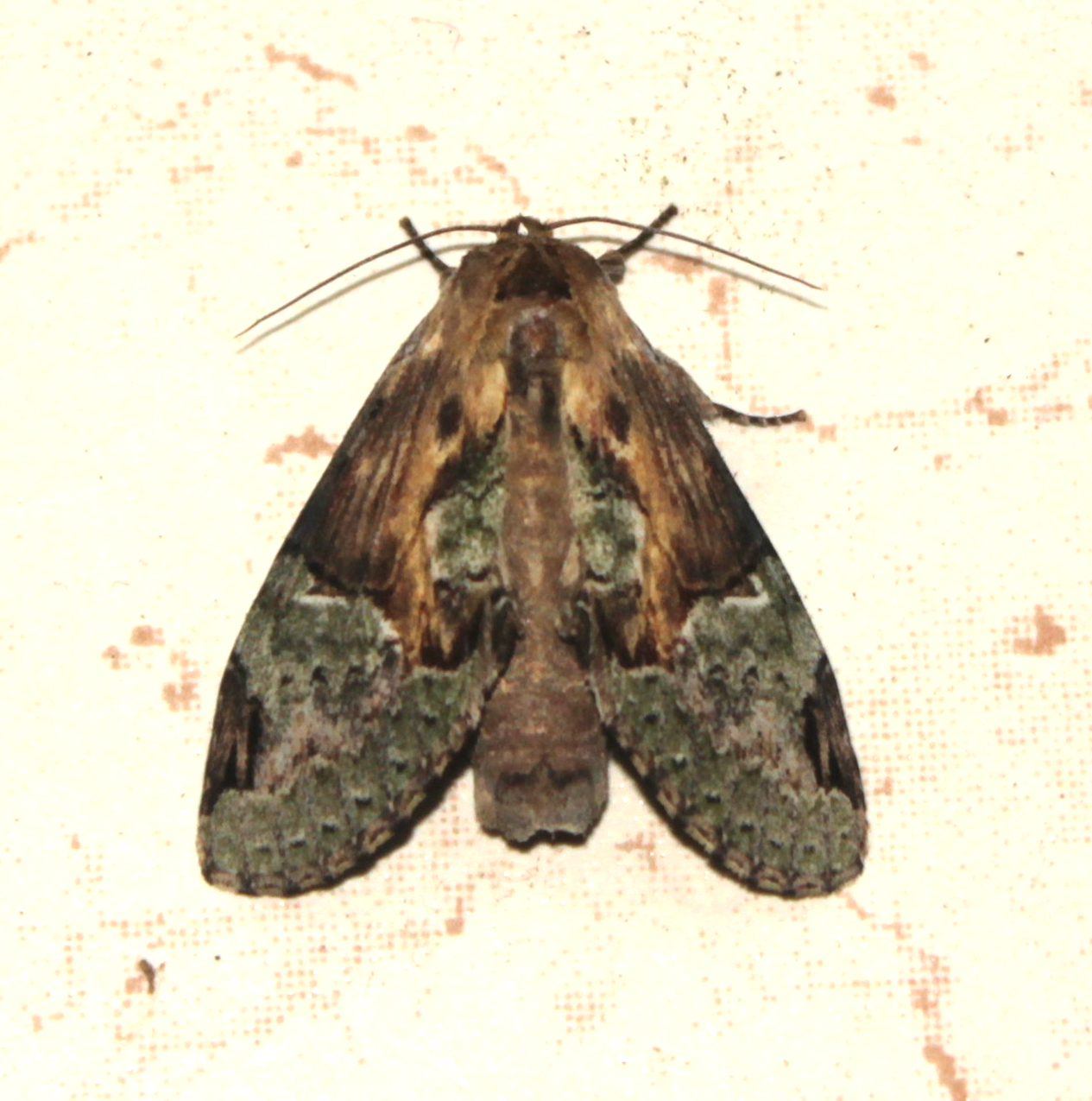
Chadisra bipars

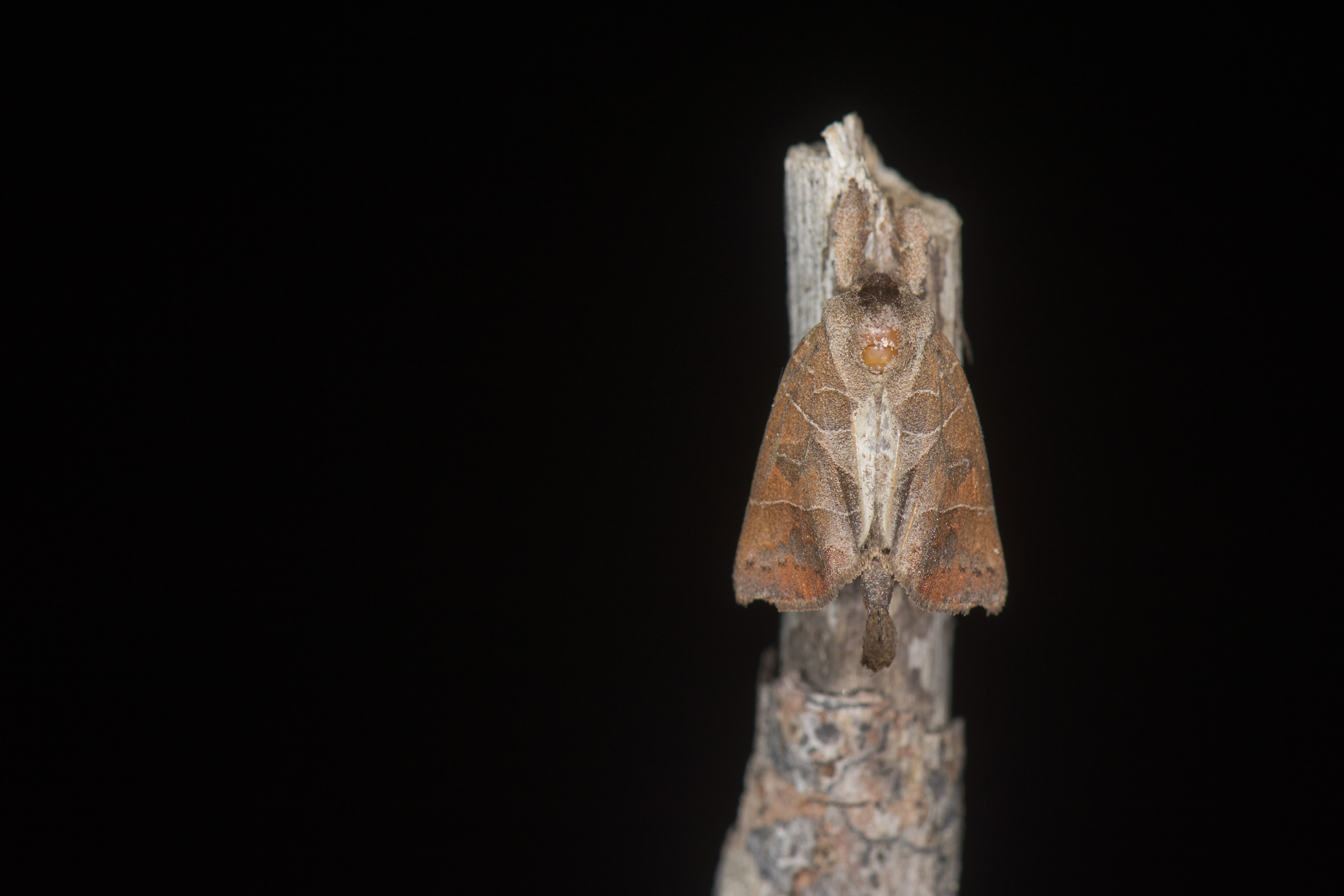
Clostera restituta

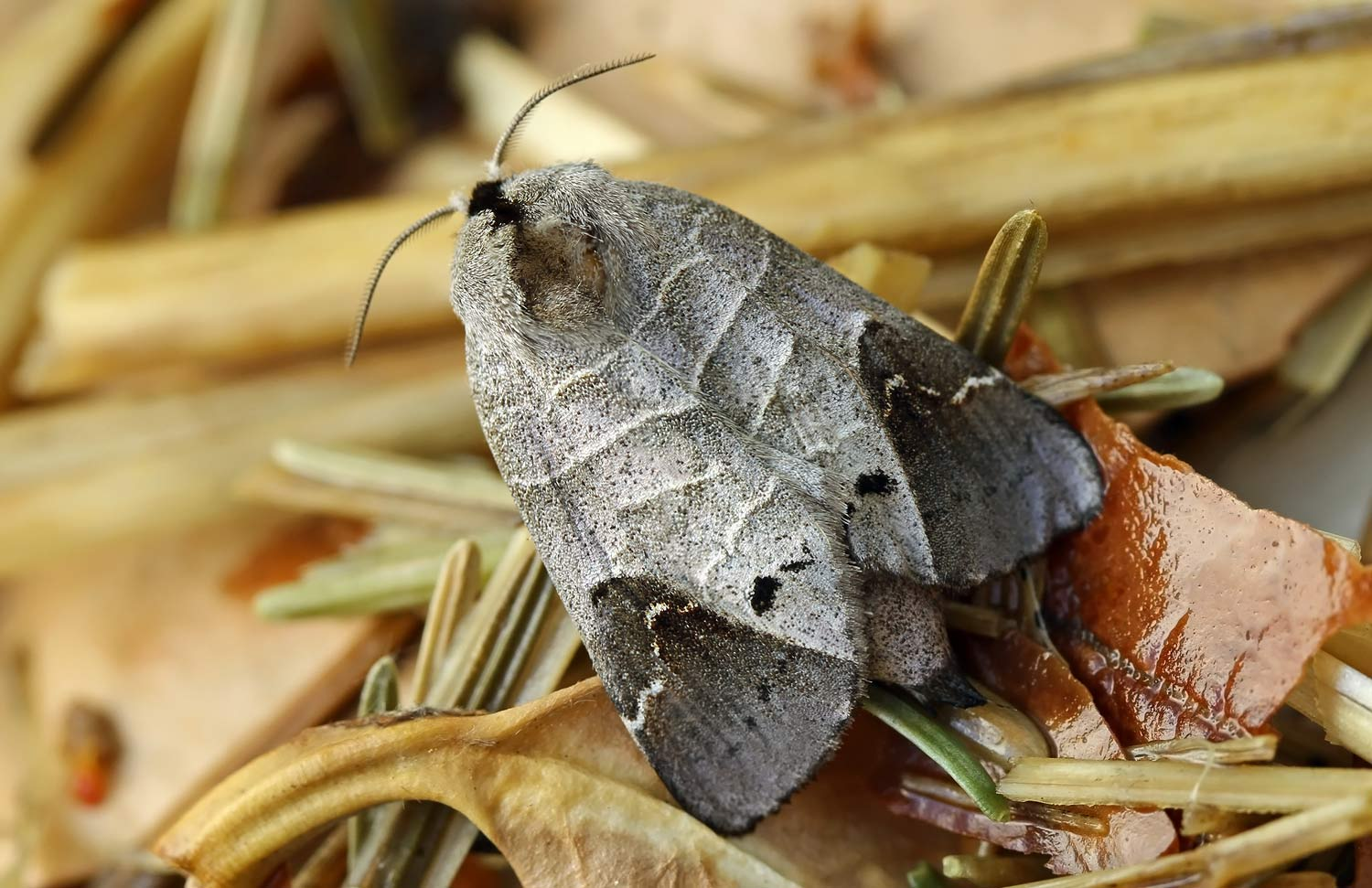
Clostera anachoreta

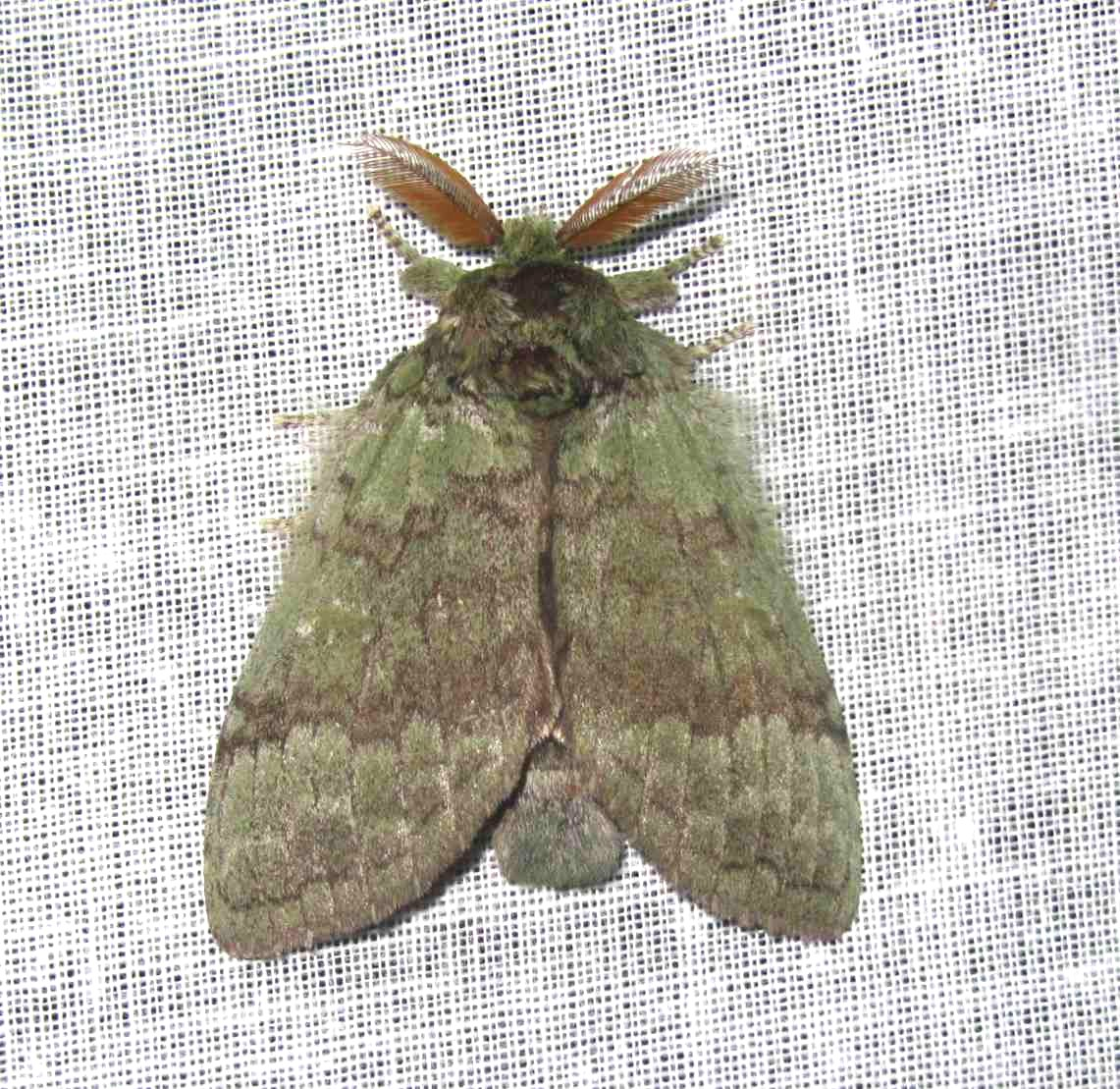
Netria viridescens

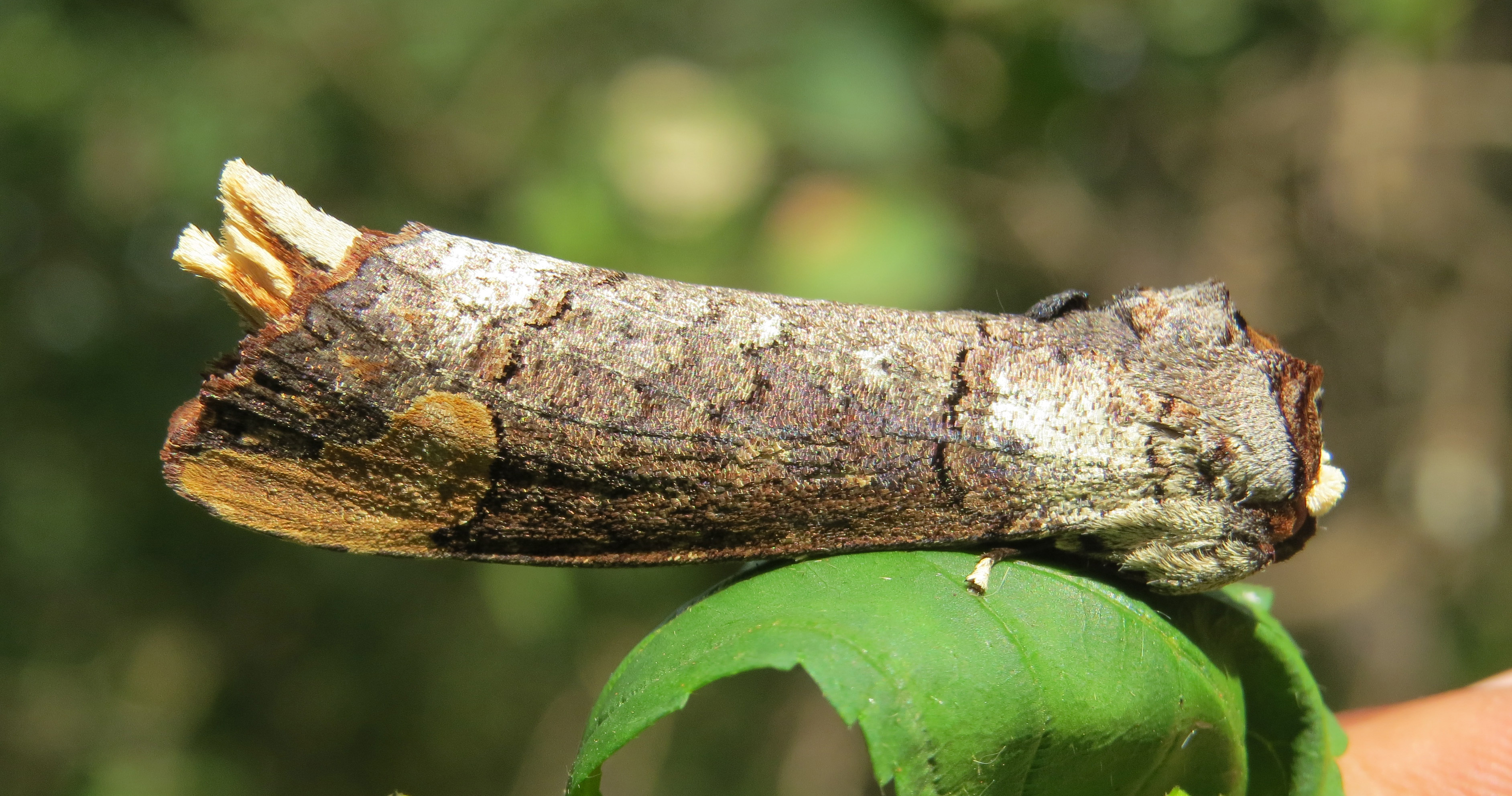
Phalera grotei

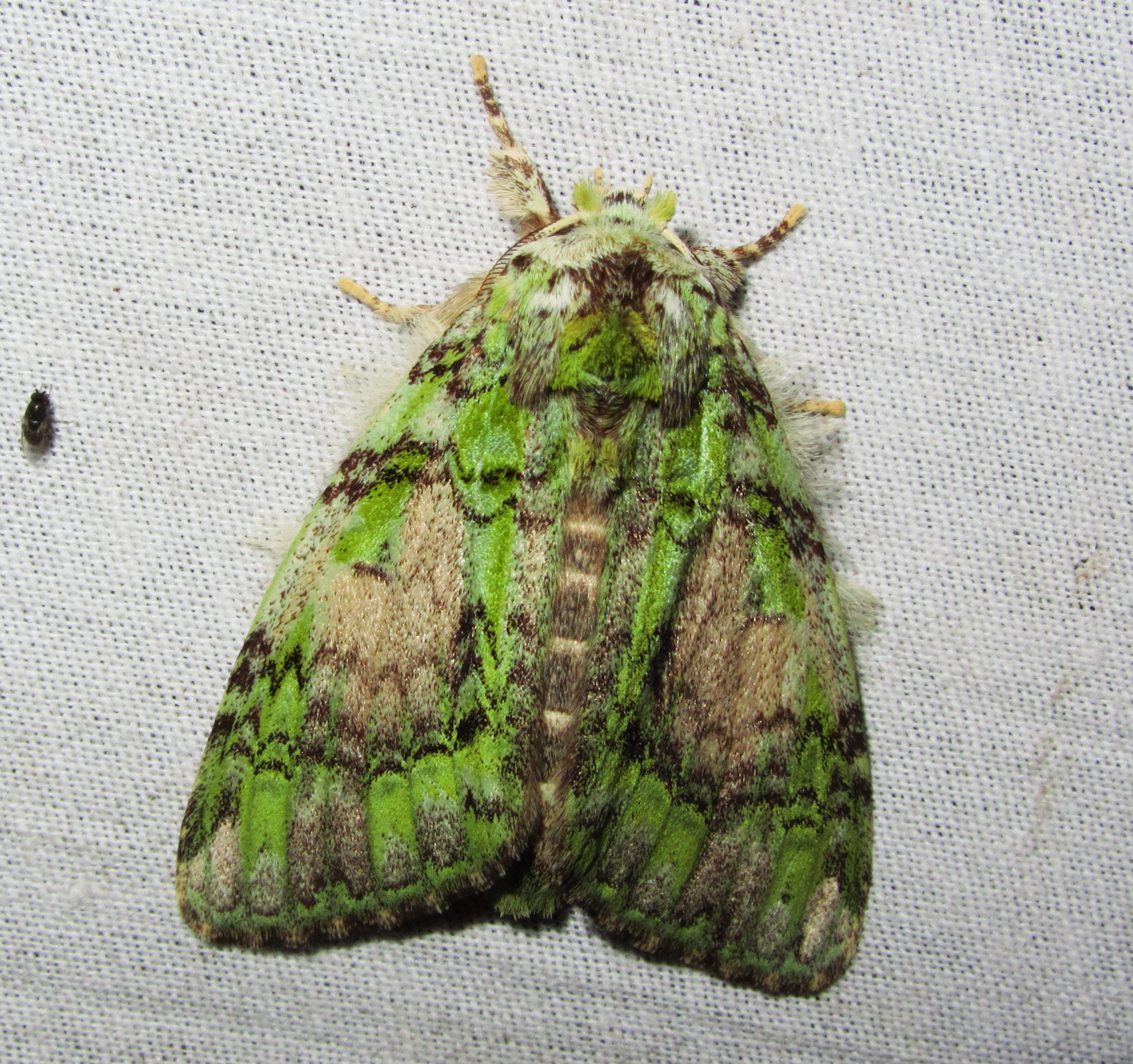
Somera viridifusca

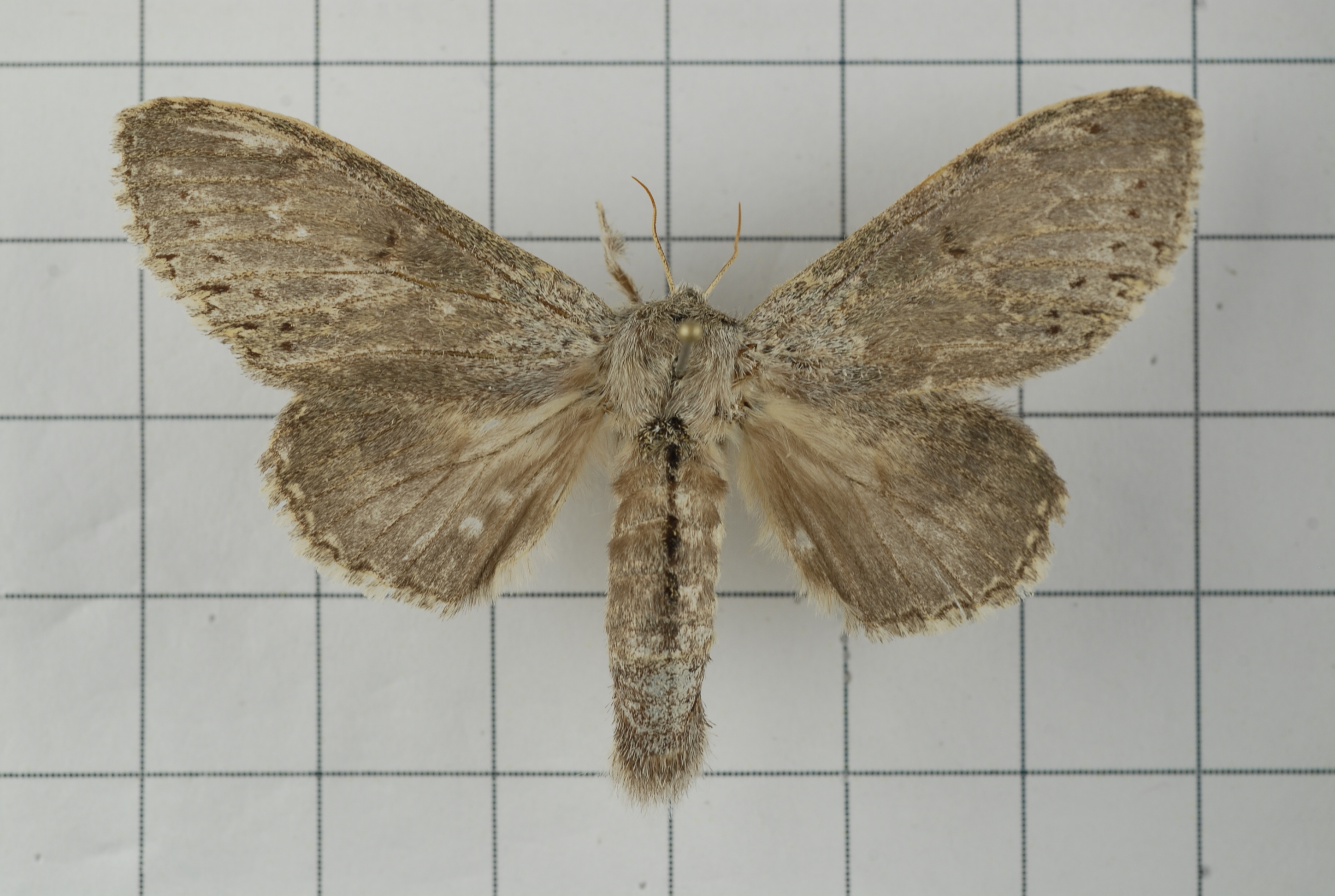
Stauropus alternus

=== Oecophoridae ===
- Acria ceramitis Meyrick, 1908
- Acria emarginella (Donovan, 1804)
- Acria obtusella (Walker, 1864)
- Eido autogramma (Meyrick, 1905)
- Macrosaces thermopa Meyrick, 1905
- Psaltica monochorda Meyrick, 1914
- Tonica niviferana (Walker, 1864)

==== Stathmopodinae ====
- Hieromantis fibulata Meyrick, 1906
- Hieromantis ioxysta Meyrick, 1913
- Oedematopoda cypris Meyrick, 1905
- Pachyrhabda bacterias Meyrick, 1913
- Pachyrhabda dicastis (Meyrick, 1905)
- Pachyrhabda tumida Meyrick, 1913
- Stathmopoda aconias Meyrick, 1910
- Stathmopoda auriferella (Walker, 1864)
- Stathmopoda diplaspis (Meyrick, 1887)
- Stathmopoda hexatyla Meyrick, 1907
- Stathmopoda iners Meyrick, 1913
- Stathmopoda masinissa Meyrick, 1906
- Stathmopoda stimulata Meyrick, 1913
- Stathmopoda triloba Meyrick, 1913
- Thylacosceles cerata Meyrick, 1913
- Thylacosceles judex Meyrick, 1913

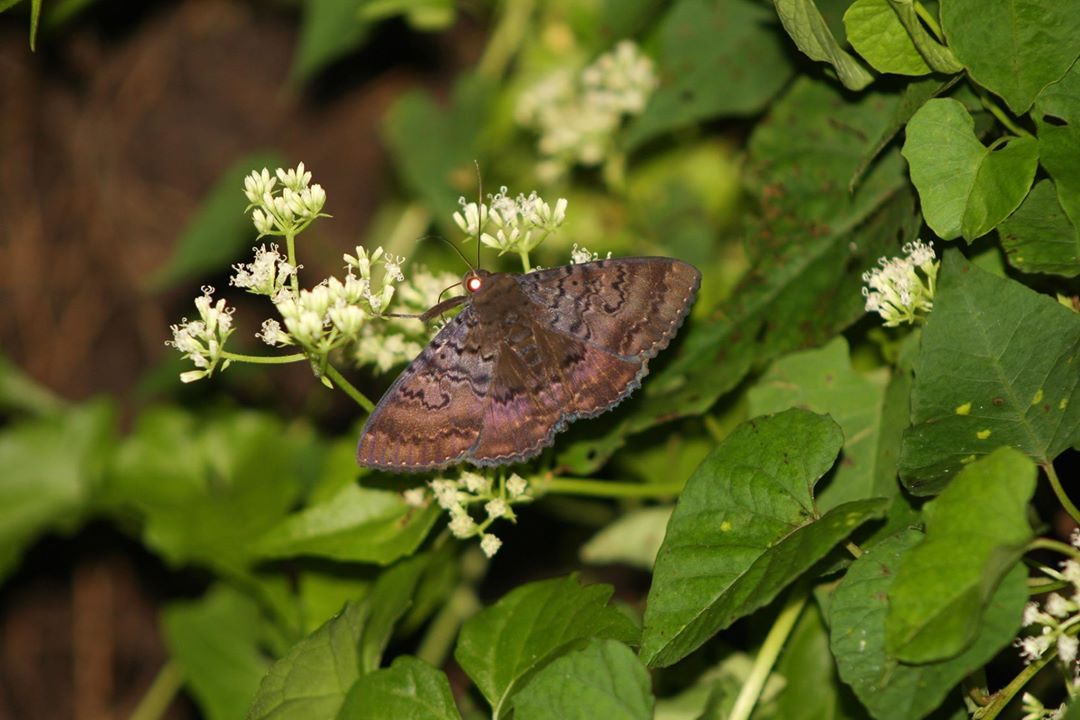

=== Plutellidae - diamondback moths ===
- Leuroperna sera Meyrick, 1885
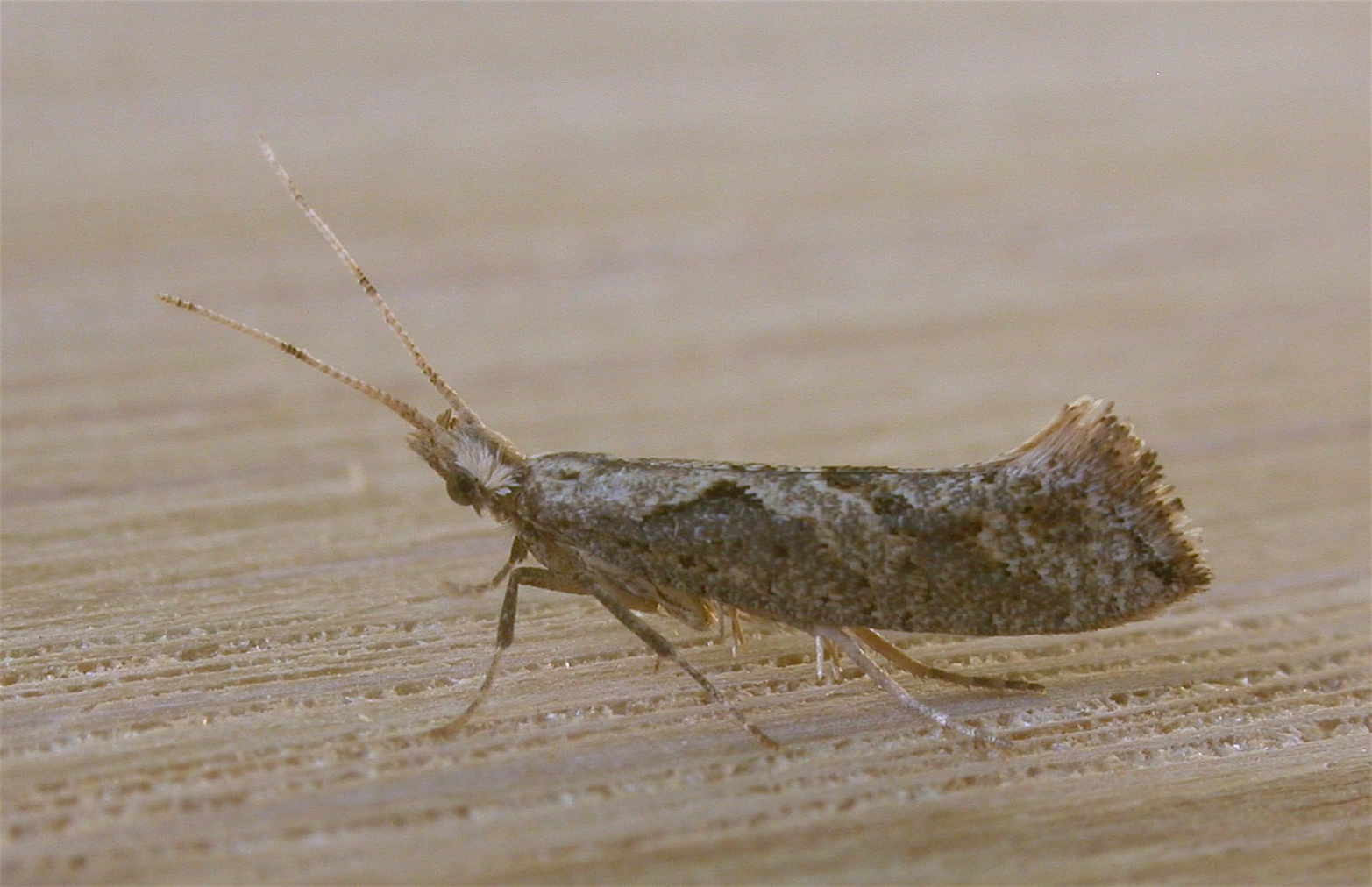
Leuroperna sera

=== Pterophoridae - plume moths ===
- Adaina microdactyla (Hübner, 1813)
- Agdistopis sinhala T. B. Fletcher, 1909
- Amblyptilia direptalis (Walker, 1864)
- Buckleria paludum (Zeller, 1841)
- Cosmoclostis leucomochla T. B. Fletcher, 1947
- Deuterocopus planeta Meyrick, 1908
- Deuterocopus ritsemae Walsingham, 1884
- Deuterocopus socotranus Rebel, 1907
- Diacrotricha fasciola (Zeller, 1851)
- Exelastis phlyctaenias (Meyrick, 1911)
- Hellinsia lienigianus (Zeller, 1852)
- Hepalastis pumilio (Zeller, 1873)
- Megalorhipida leucodactyla (Fabricius, 1794)
- Nippoptilia regulus (Meyrick, 1906)
- Ochyrotica concursa (Walsingham, 1891)
- Oxyptilus causodes Meyrick, 1905
- Oxyptilus epidectis Meyrick, 1908
- Platyptilia citropleura Meyrick, 1907
- Platyptilia molopias Meyrick, 1906
- Procapperia pelecyntes (Meyrick, 1907)
- Pterophorus leucadactylus (Walker, 1864)
- Pterophorus melanopodus (T. B. Fletcher, 1907)
- Pterophorus niveodactyla (Pagenstecher, 1900)
- Sphenarches anisodactylus (Walker, 1864)
- Sphenarches zanclistes (Meyrick, 1905)
- Stangeia xerodes (Meyrick, 1886)
- Stenodacma wahlbergi (Zeller, 1852)
- Stenodacma pyrrhodes (Meyrick, 1889)
- Stenoptilia petraea Meyrick, 1908
- Stenoptilodes taprobanes (Felder & Rogenhofer, 1875)
- Trichoptilus regalis (T. B. Fletcher, 1909)
- Xyroptila vaughani (T. B. Fletcher, 1909)

=== Psychidae - bagworm moths ===
- Acanthopsyche cana Hampson, 1892
- Acanthopsyche subteralbata Hampson, 1893
- Aprata mackwoodii Moore, 1883
- Bambalina consorta (Templeton, 1847)
- Chaliella doubledaii (Westwood, 1854)
- Chalioides vitrea Swinhoe, 1892
- Eumeta crameri (Westwood), 1854
- Eumeta variegata (Snellen, 1879)
- Eurukuttarus rotunda Hampson
- Heylaertsia fusca (Hampson, 1893)
- Heylaertsia griseata (Hampson, 1893)
- Heylaertsia nudilineata Hampson, 1893
- Heylaertsia quadripuncta (Hampson, 1897)
- Manatha albipes Moore, 1877
- Metisa plana Walker, 1883
- Narycia marmarurga (Meyrick, 1907)
- Narycia obserata Meyrick, 1919
- Narycia platyzona (Meyrick, 1905)
- Pteroma plagiophleps Hampson, 1892
- Pteroxys goniatus Hampson, 1893
- Pteroxys uniformis Hampson, 1893
- Psomocolax rhabdophora (Hampson, 1892)
- Sapheneutis camerata Meyrick, 1907
- Sapheneutis metacentra Meyrick, 1907
- Typhonia anasactis (Meyrick, 1907)
- Typhonia autopetra (Meyrick, 1907)
- Typhonia energa (Meyrick, 1905)
- Typhonia expressa (Meyrick, 1916)
- Typhonia frenigera (Meyrick, 1911)
- Typhonia granularis (Meyrick, 1916)
- Typhonia leucosceptra (Meyrick, 1907)
- Typhonia metherca (Meyrick, 1916)
- Typhonia stratifica (Meyrick, 1907)
- Typhonia tetraspila (Meyrick, 1905)

=== Pyralidae - pyralid moths ===
- Bostra gnidusalis (Walker, 1859)
- Cryptophycita deflandrella (Ragonot, 1893)
- Emmalocera apotomella (Meyrick, 1879)
- Emmalocera nigricostalis (Walker, 1863)
- Guastica semilutea Walker, 1863

==== Epipaschiinae ====
- Coenodomus trichasema (Hampson, 1916)
- Stericta divitalis (Guenée, 1854)

==== Gallerinae ====
- Achroia grisella (Fabricius, 1794)
- Achroia innotata Walker, 1764
- Agdistopis sinhala Hampson, 1917
- Aphomia monochroa (Hampson, 1912)
- Aphomia odontella (Hampson, 1901)
- Aphomia sopozhnikovi (Krulikovsky, 1909)
- Aphomia vinotincta (Hampson, 1908)
- Aphomia zelleri (de Joannis, 1932)
- Corcyra cephalonica (Stainton, 1866)
- Doloessa ochrociliella (Ragonot, 1893)
- Doloessa viridis Zeller, 1848
- Ertzica morosella (Walker, 1863)
- Lamoria adaptella (Walker, 1863)
- Lamoria anella (Denis & Schiffermüller, 1775)
- Lamoria infumatella Hampson, 1898
- Lamoria jordanis Staudinger, 1901
- Lamoria virescens Hampson, 1898
- Picrogama nigrisparsalis Hampson, 1903
- Prasinoxena metaleuca Hampson, 1912
- Stenachroia elongella Hampson, 1898
- Taurometopa aryrostrota Hampson, 1917
- Tirathaba rufivena (Walker, 1864)
- Trachylepidia fructicassiella Ragonot, 1887

==== Phycitinae ====
- Addyme aspiciella Ragonot, 1889
- Ammatucha semiirrorella (Hampson, 1896)
- Ancylodes lapsalis (Walker, 1859)
- Anerastia celsella Walker, 1863
- Anonaepestis bengalella Ragonot, 1894
- Assara albicostalis Walker, 1863
- Assara seminivale (Turner, 1904)
- Aurana actiosella Walker, 1863
- Cadra cautella (Walker, 1863)
- Calguia defiguralis Walker, 1863
- Cathyalia fulvella Ragonot, 1888
- Ceroprepes patriciella Zeller, 1867
- Ceroprepes proximalis Walker
- Citripestis sagittiferella (Moore, 1891)
- Coleothrix longicosta Du, Song and Wu, 2007
- Coleothrix swinhoeella (Ragonot, 1893)
- Copamyntis infusella (Meyrick, 1879)
- Copamyntis obliquifasciella Hampson 1896
- Cryptoblabes angustipennella Ragonot, 1888
- Cryptoblabes ephestialis Hampson, 1903
- Cryptoblabes proleucella Hampson, 1896
- Dipha aphidivora (Meyrick, 1934)
- Epicrocis festivella Zeller, 1848
- Epicrocis hilarella Ragonot, 1888
- Etiella grisea Hampson, 1903
- Etiella zinckenella (Treitschke, 1832)
- Euzophera perticella Ragonot, 1888
- Euzopherodes albicans Hampson, 1899
- Faveria leucophaeella (Zeller, 1867)
- Hyphantidium albicostale (Walker, 1863)
- Hypsipyla elachistalis Hampson, 1903
- Hypsipyla robusta (Moore, [1886])
- Maliarpha separatella Ragonot, 1888
- Metacrateria pulverulella Hampson, 1896
- Phycita atrisquamella (Hampson, 1901)
- Phycita clientella (Zeller, 1867)
- Phycita eulepidella Hampson, 1896
- Phycita nodicornella (Ragonot, 1888)
- Polyocha vesculella Ragonot, 1888
- Pseudodavara haemaphoralis (Hampson, 1908)
- Saluria inficita Walker, 1863
- Saluria ochridorsella Ragonot, 1888
- Sandrabatis crassiella Ragonot, 1893
- Singhalia sarcoglauca (Hampson, 1896)
- Spatulipalpia pallicostalis (Walker, 1863)
- Thylacoptila paurosema Meyrick, 1885
- Volobilis biplaga Walker, 1863
- Volobilis chloropterella (Hampson, 1896)
- Zitha torridalis (Lederer, 1863)

==== Pyralinae ====
- Endotricha albicilia Hampson, 1891
- Endotricha loricata (Moore, 1888)
- Endotricha mesenterialis (Walker, 1859)
- Endotricha ruminalis (Walker, 1859)
- Hymenia perspectalis (Hübner, 1796)
- Hypsopygia nonusalis (Walker, 1859)
- Loryma recusata (Walker, 1864)
- Tanyethira duplicilinea (Hampson, 1893)
- Thiallela ligeralis (Walker, 1863)
- Triphassa bilineata Moore 1887
- Vitessa suradeva Moore, 1860
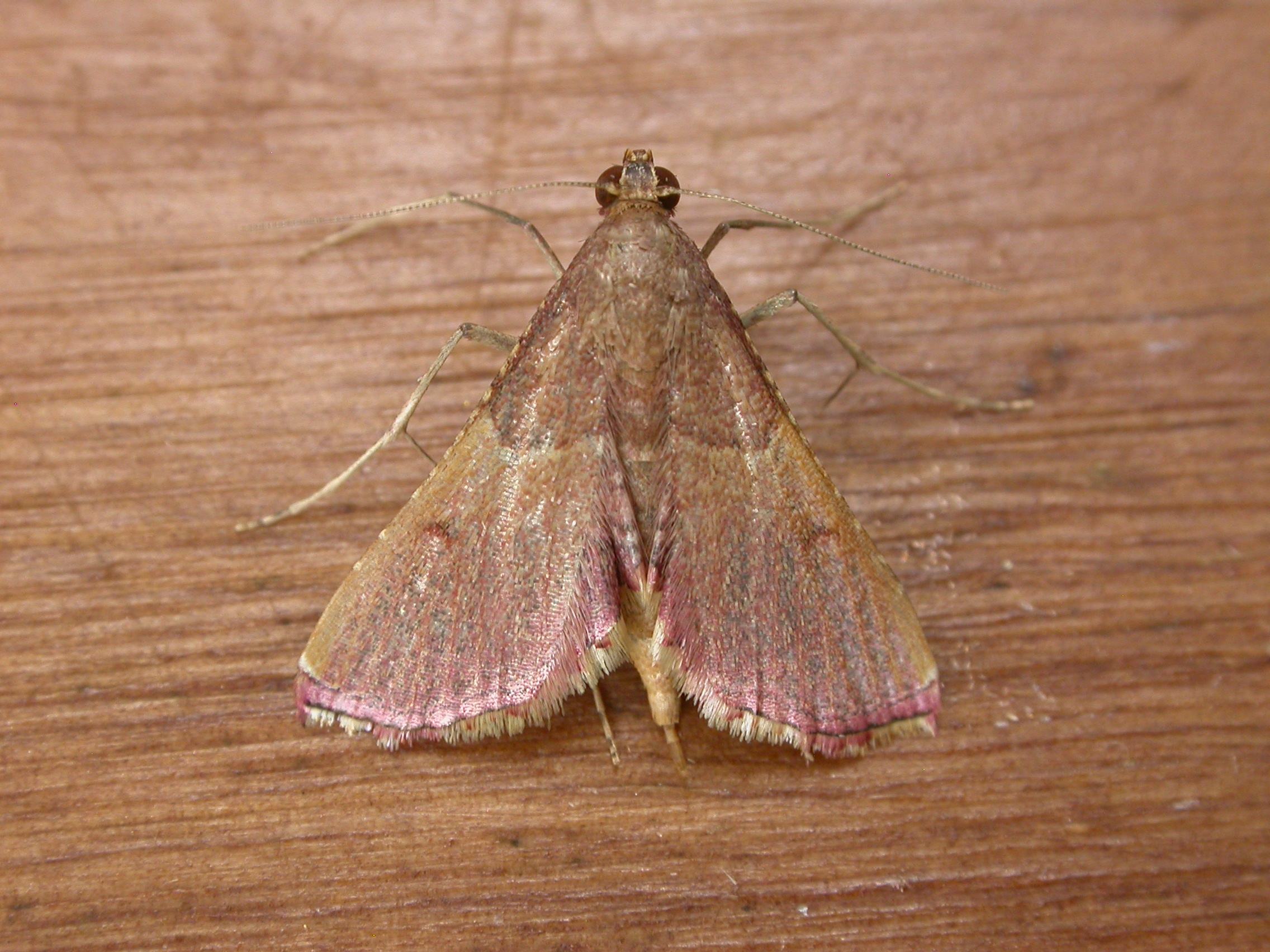
Endotricha mesenterialis

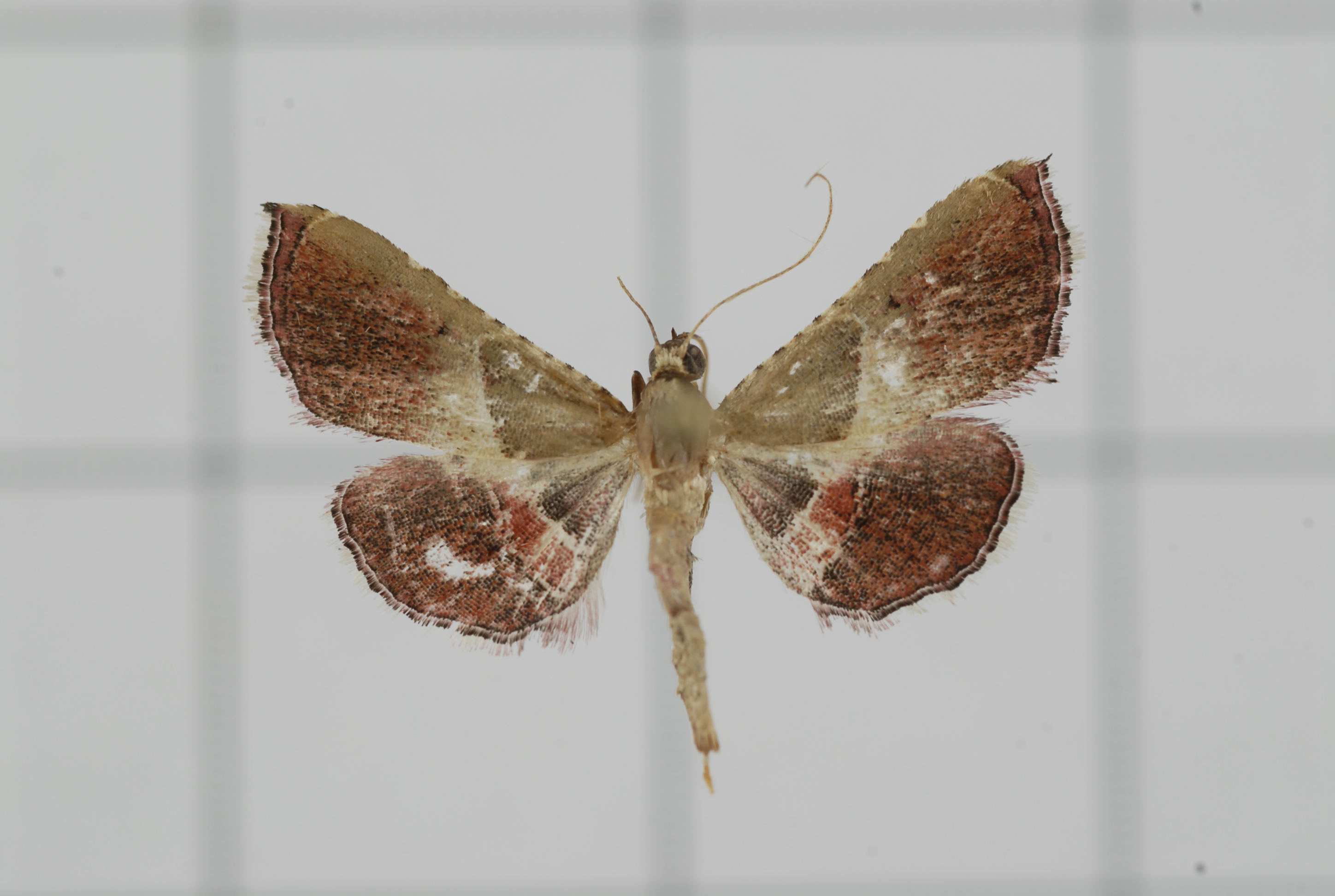
Endotricha ruminalis

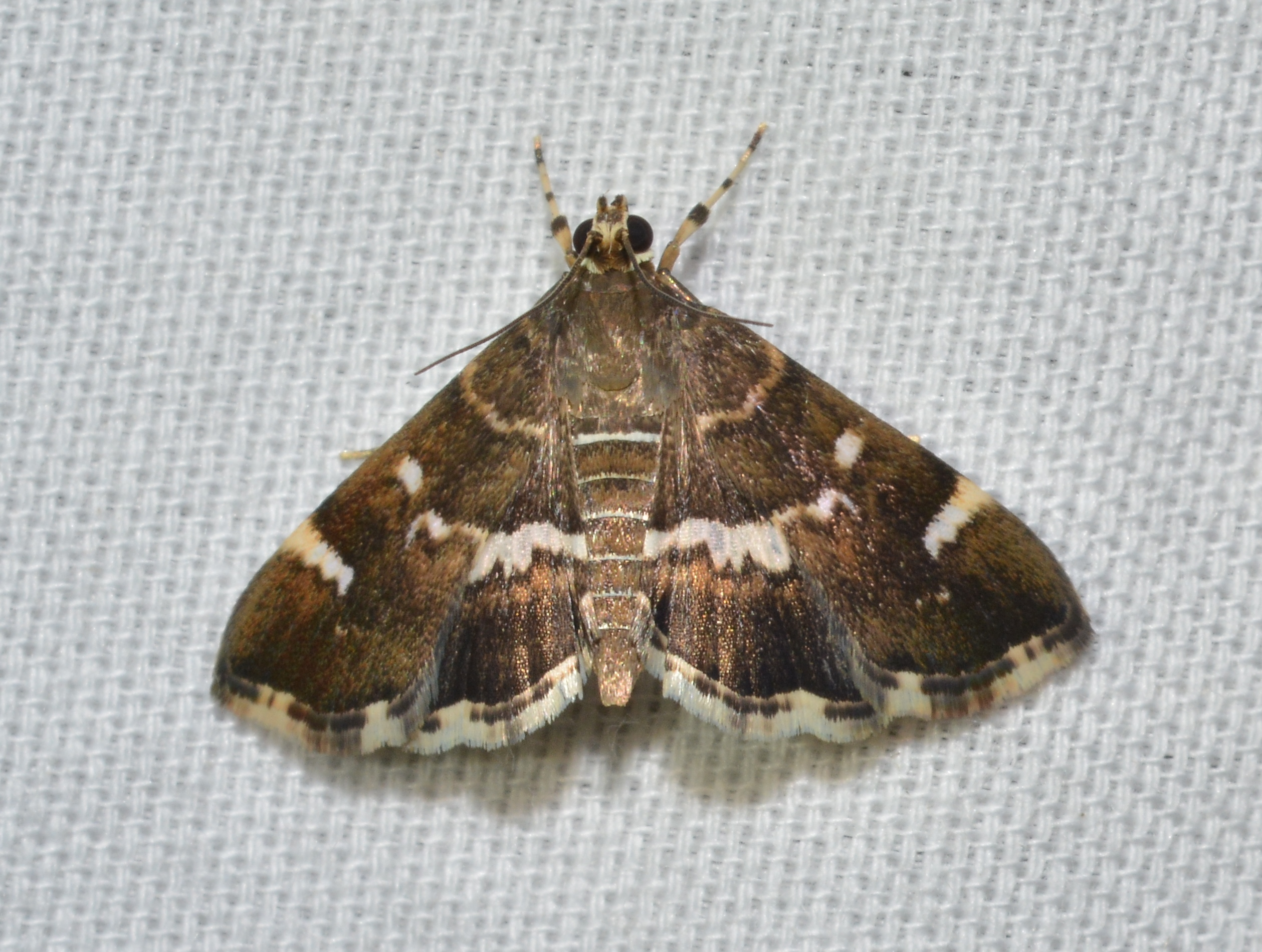
Hymenia perspectalis

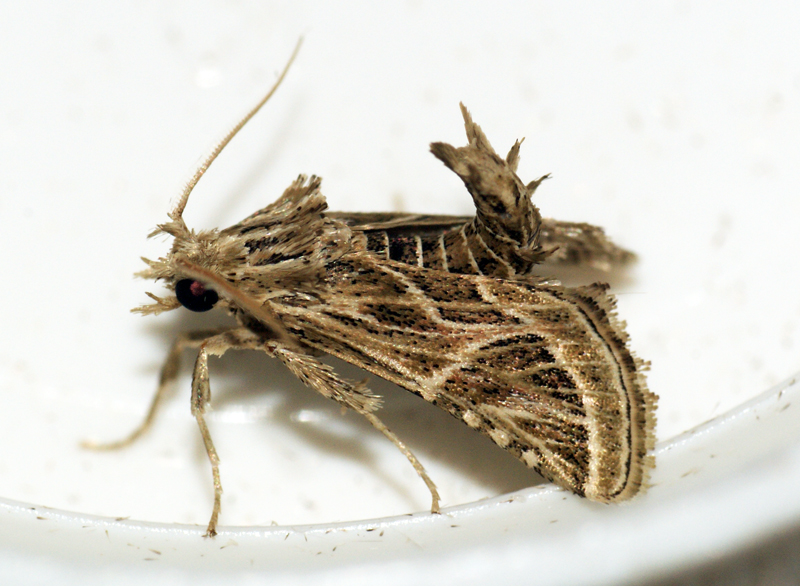
Loryma recusata

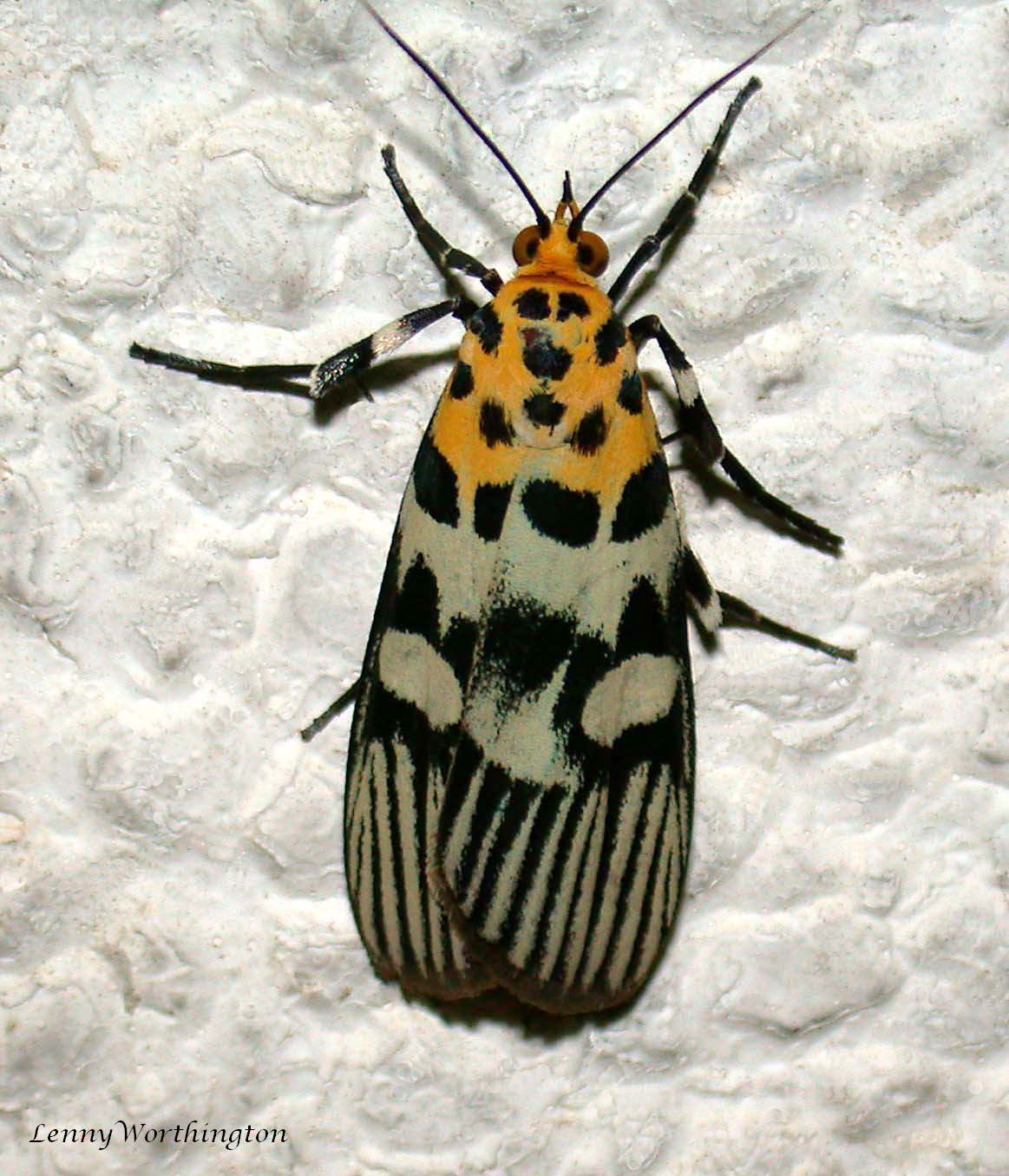
Vitessa suradeva

=== Saturniidae - giant silkworm and royal moths ===
- Actias selene Paukstadt & Paukstadt, 1999 - ssp. taprobanis
- Antheraea cingalesa (Moore, 1883)
- Antheraea pernyi (Guérin-Méneville, 1855) ...?
- Antheraea paphia Linnaeus, 1758 ...?
- Attacus atlas (Linnaeus, 1758) ...?
- Attacus taprobanis (Moore, 1883)
- Cricula ceylonica (Jordan, 1909)
- Cricula trifenestrata Helfer, 1837 ...?
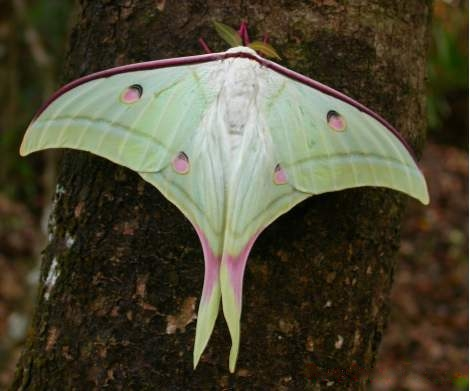
Actias selene

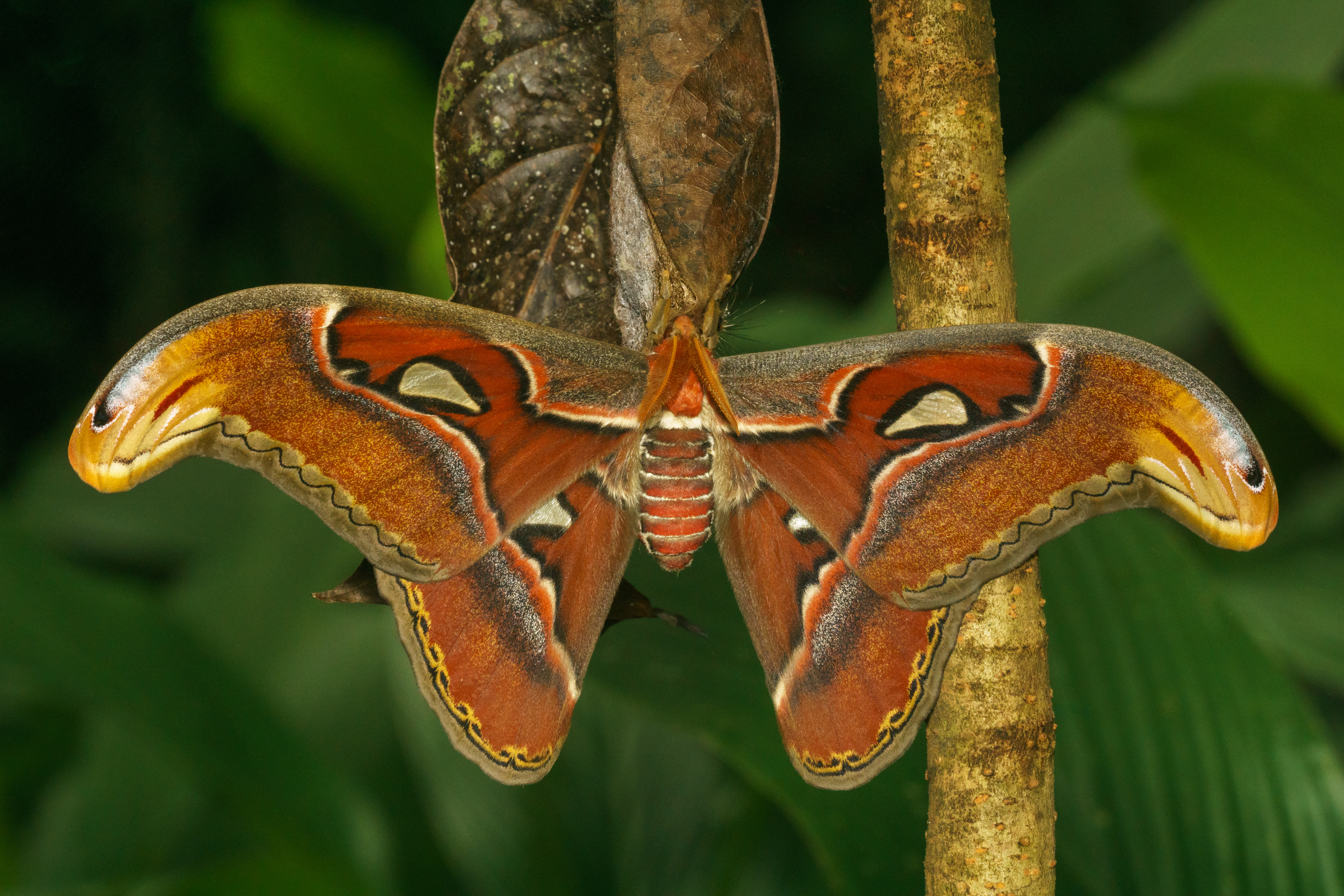
Attacus taprobanis

=== Sesiidae - clearwing moths ===
- Chamanthedon flavipes Hampson, 1893
- Melittia bombyliformis Cramer, 1782 - syn. Melittia chalciformis
- Oligophlebia nigralba Hampson, 1893
- Synanthedon flavicaudata (Moore, 1887)

=== Sphingidae - sphinx moths ===
- Acosmeryx shervillii Boisduval, [1875]
- Acherontia lachesis (Fabricius, 1798)
- Acherontia styx Westwood, 1847
- Agrius convolvuli (Linnaeus, 1758)
- Ambulyx moorei Moore, [1858]
- Ambulyx substrigilis Westwood, 1847
- Amplypterus panopus (Cramer, [1779])
- Angonyx krishna Eitschberger & Haxaire, 2006
- Cephonodes hylas (Linnaeus, [1771])
- Cypa ferruginea Walker, 1865
- Daphnis hypothous (Cramer, 1780)
- Daphnis layardii Moore, 1882
- Daphnis minima Butler, 1876
- Daphnis nerii (Linnaeus, 1758)
- Eupanacra busiris (Walker, 1856)
- Hippotion boerhaviae (Fabricius, 1775)
- Hippotion celerio (Linnaeus, 1758)
- Hippotion rafflesii (Moore, [1858])
- Hippotion rosetta (Swinhoe, 1892)
- Hippotion velox (Fabricius, 1793)
- Leucophlebia lineata Westwood, 1847
- Macroglossum affictitia Butler, 1875
- Macroglossum assimilis Swainson, 1821
- Macroglossum belis (Linnaeus, 1758)
- Macroglossum corythus Walker 1856
- Macroglossum glaucoptera Butler, 1875
- Macroglossum gyrans Walker, 1856
- Macroglossum insipida Butler, 1875
- Macroglossum mitchellii Boisduval, 1875
- Macroglossum passalus (Drury, 1773)
- Macroglossum prometheus Boisduval, 1875
- Macroglossum pyrrhosticta Butler, 1875
- Macroglossum sitiene Walker, 1856
- Macroglossum sylvia Boisduval, 1875
- Marumba dyras (Walker, 1856)
- Megacorma obliqua (Walker, 1856)
- Meganoton nyctiphanes (Walker, 1856)
- Neogurelca hyas (Walker, 1856)
- Nephele hespera (Fabricius, 1775)
- Pergesa acteus (Cramer, 1779)
- Polyptychus trilineatus Moore, 1888
- Psilogramma bartschereri Eitschberger, 2001
- Psilogramma increta (Walker 1865)
- Psilogramma menephron (Cramer, 1780)
- Psilogramma renneri Eitschberger, 2001
- Psilogramma vates (Butler, 1875)
- Theretra alecto (Linnaeus, 1758)
- Theretra boisduvalii (Bugnion, 1839)
- Theretra clotho (Drury, 1773)
- Theretra gnoma (Fabricius, 1775)
- Theretra latreillii (WS Macleay, 1826)
- Theretra lycetus (Cramer, 1775)
- Theretra nessus (Drury, 1773)
- Theretra oldenlandiae (Fabricius, 1775)
- Theretra pallicosta (Walker, 1856)
- Theretra silhetensis (Walker, 1856)
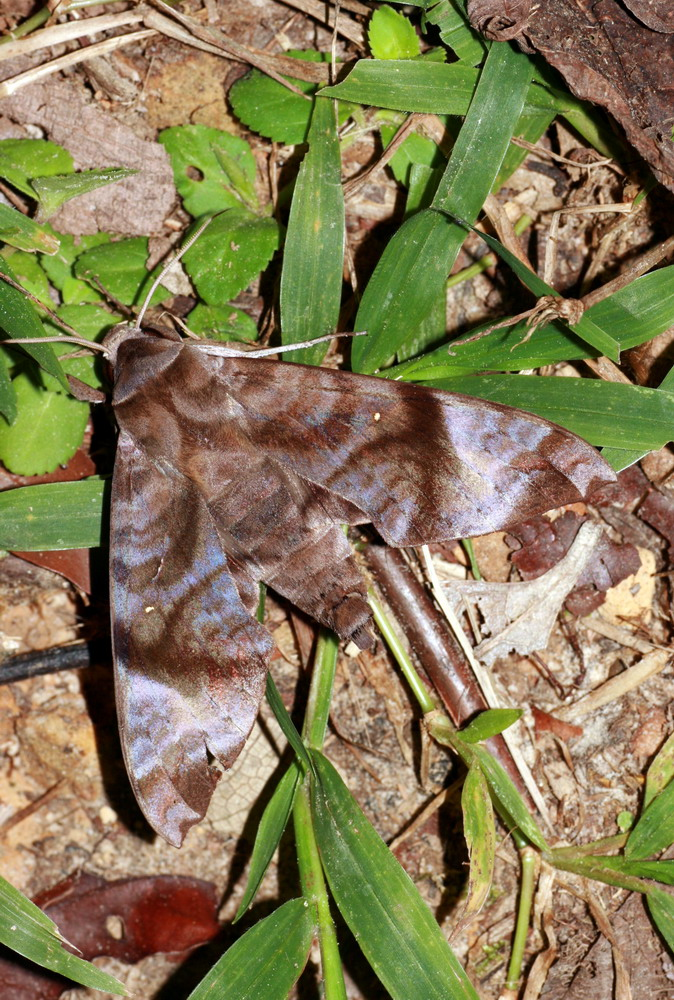
Acosmeryx shervillii

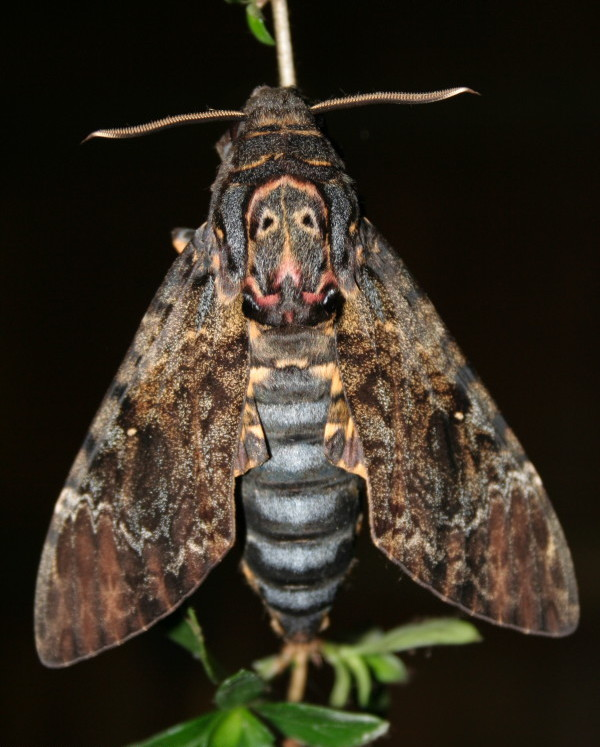
Acherontia lachesis

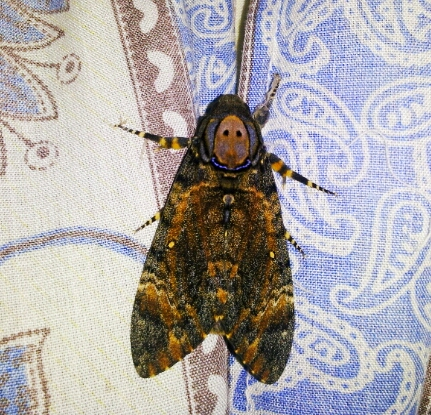
Acherontia styx

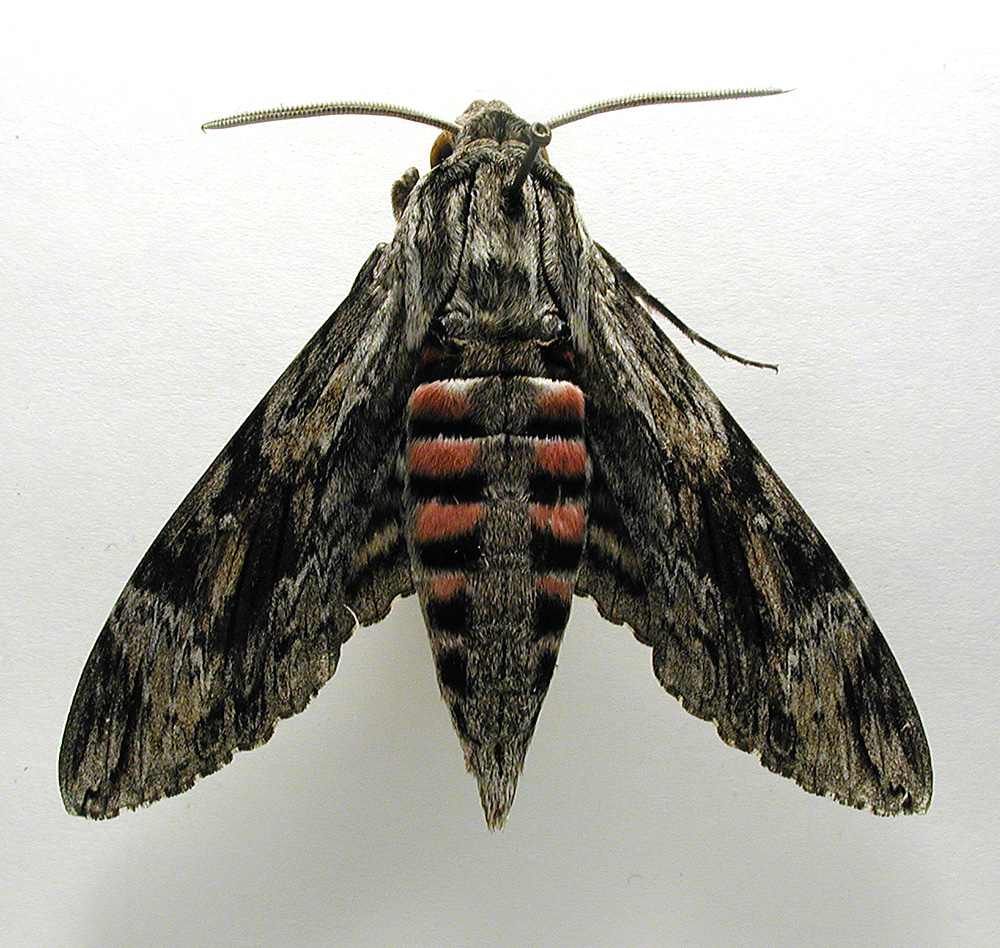
Agrius convolvuli

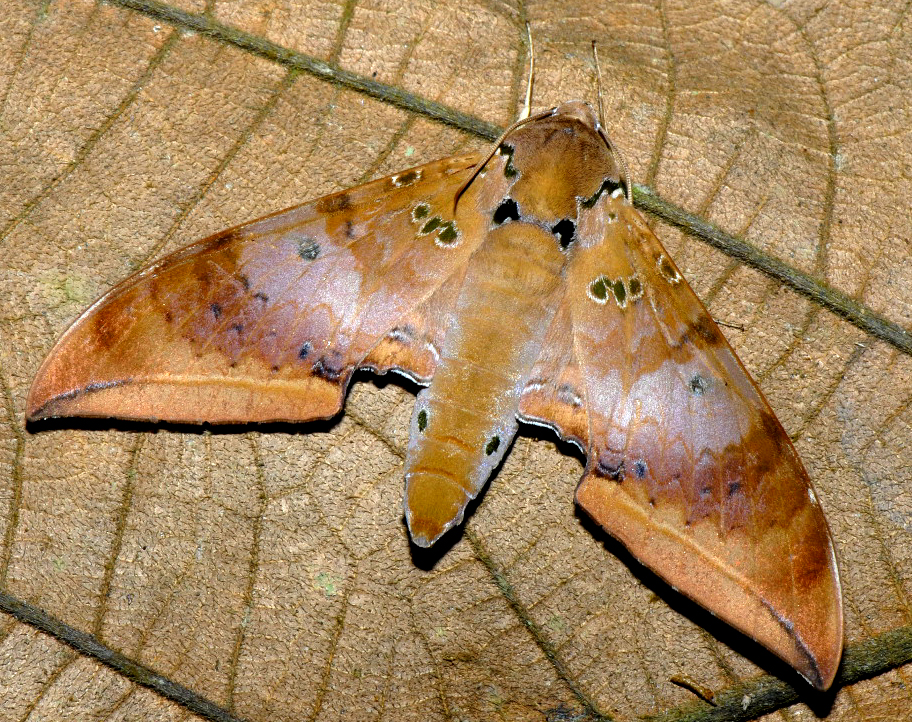
Ambulyx moorei

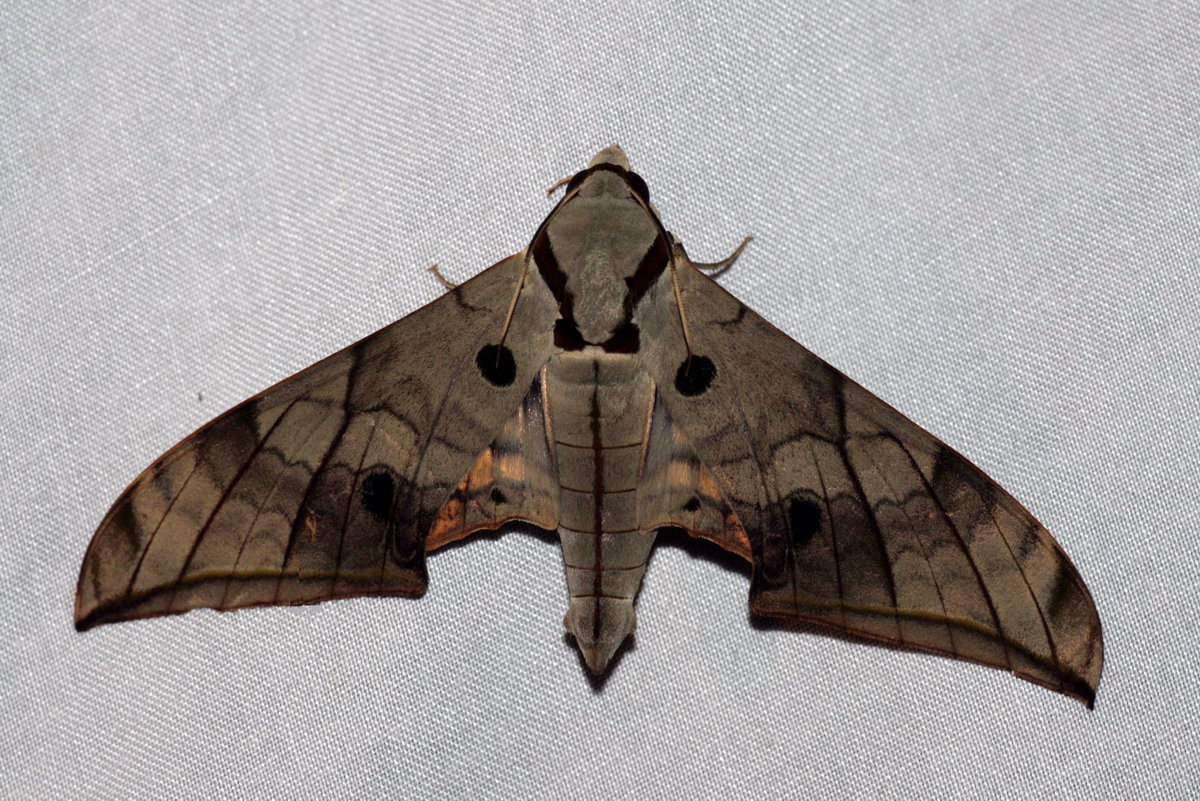
Ambulyx substrigilis

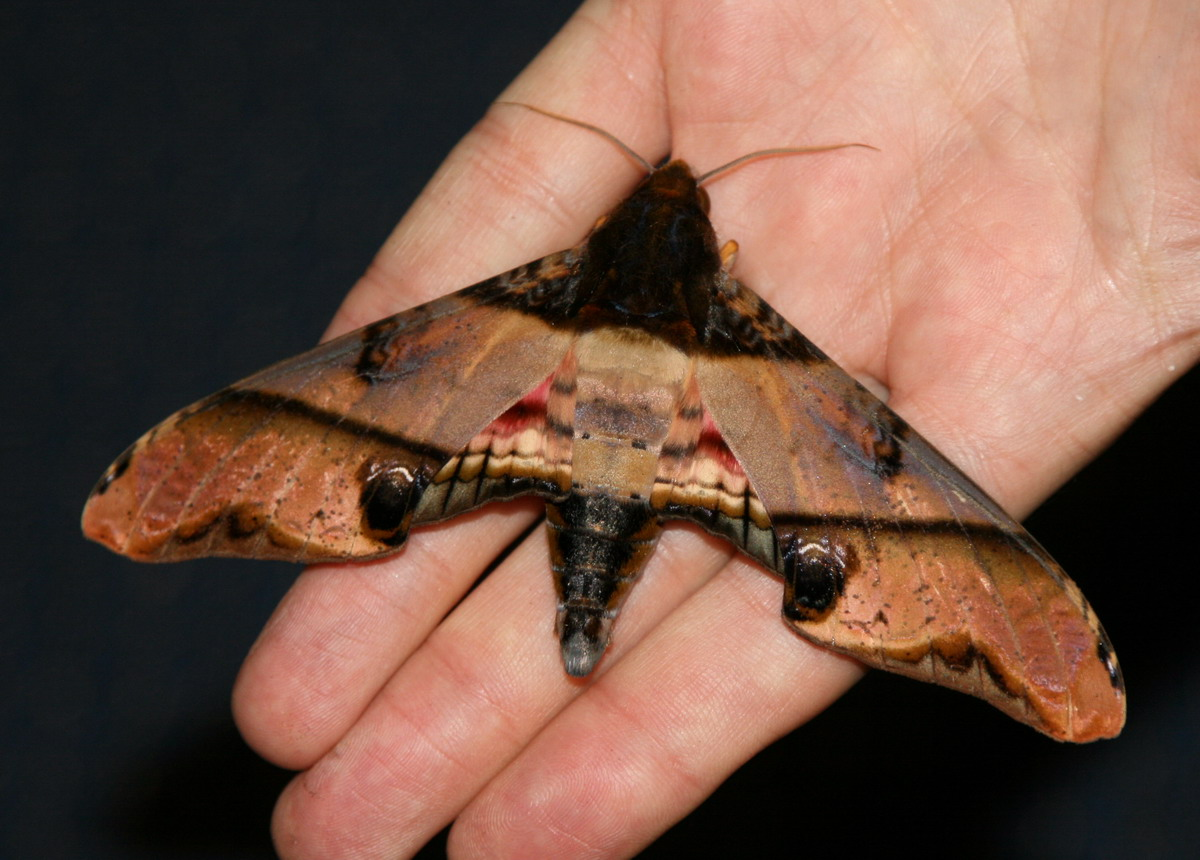
Amplypterus panopus

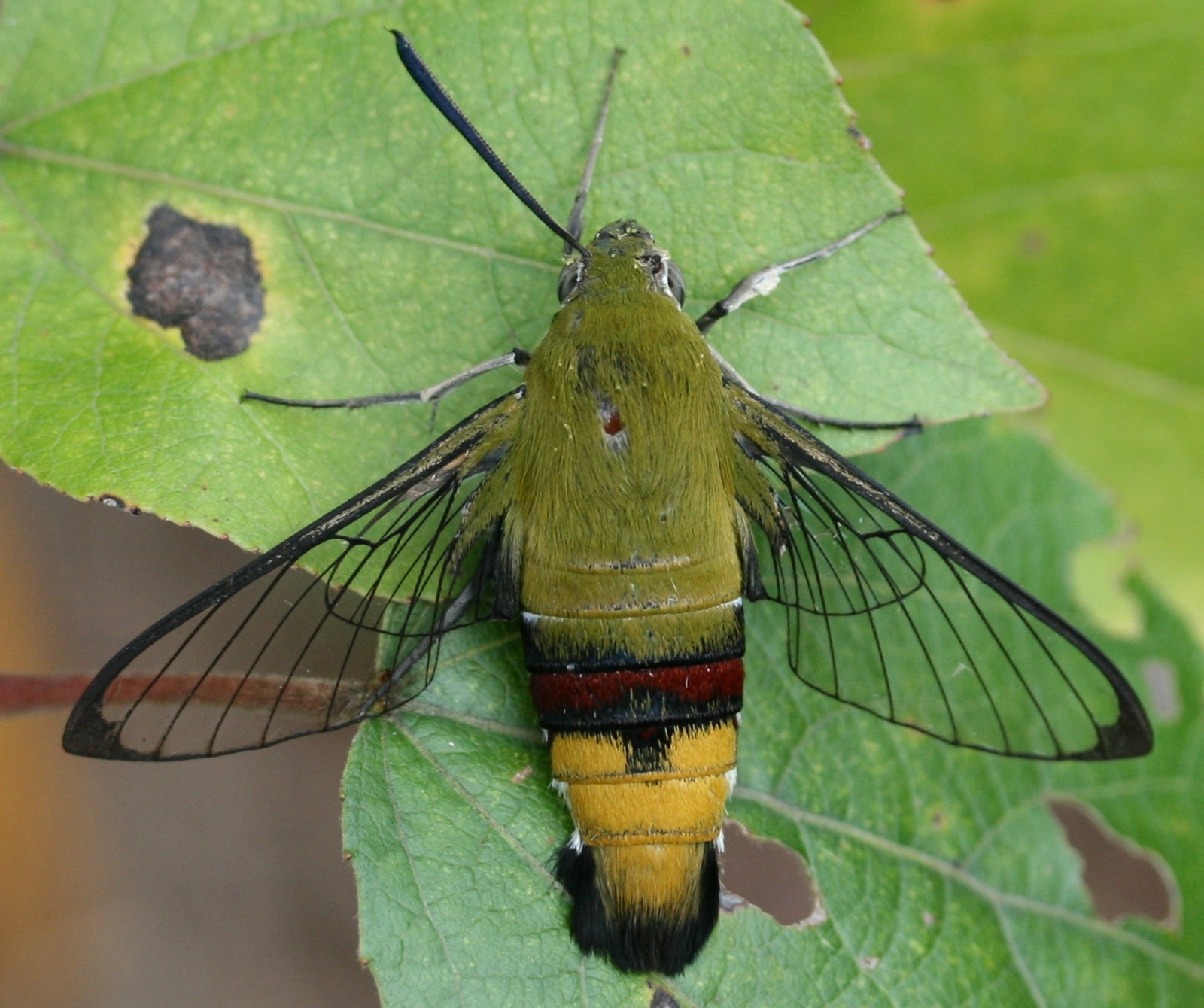
Cephonodes hylas

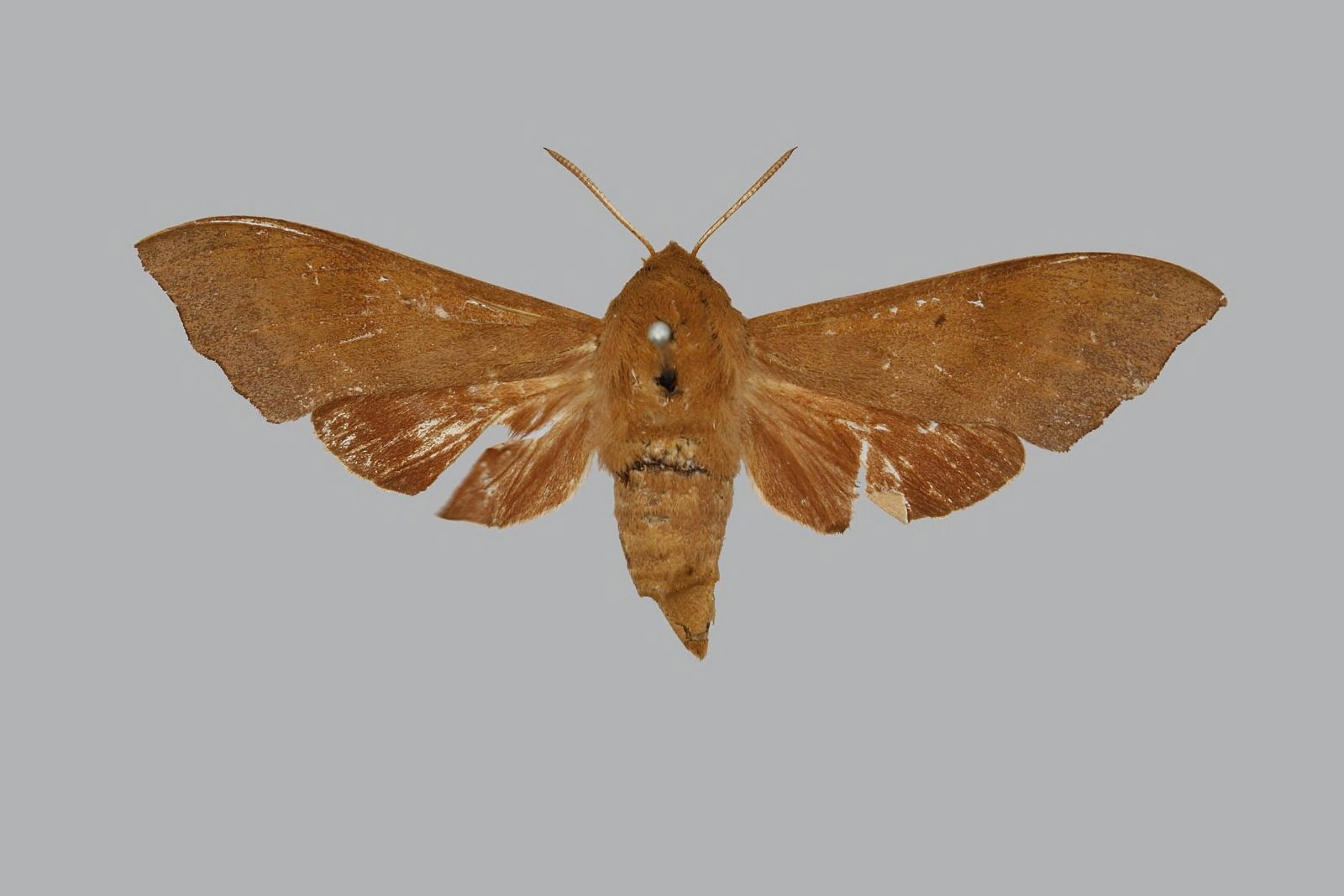
Cypa ferruginea female

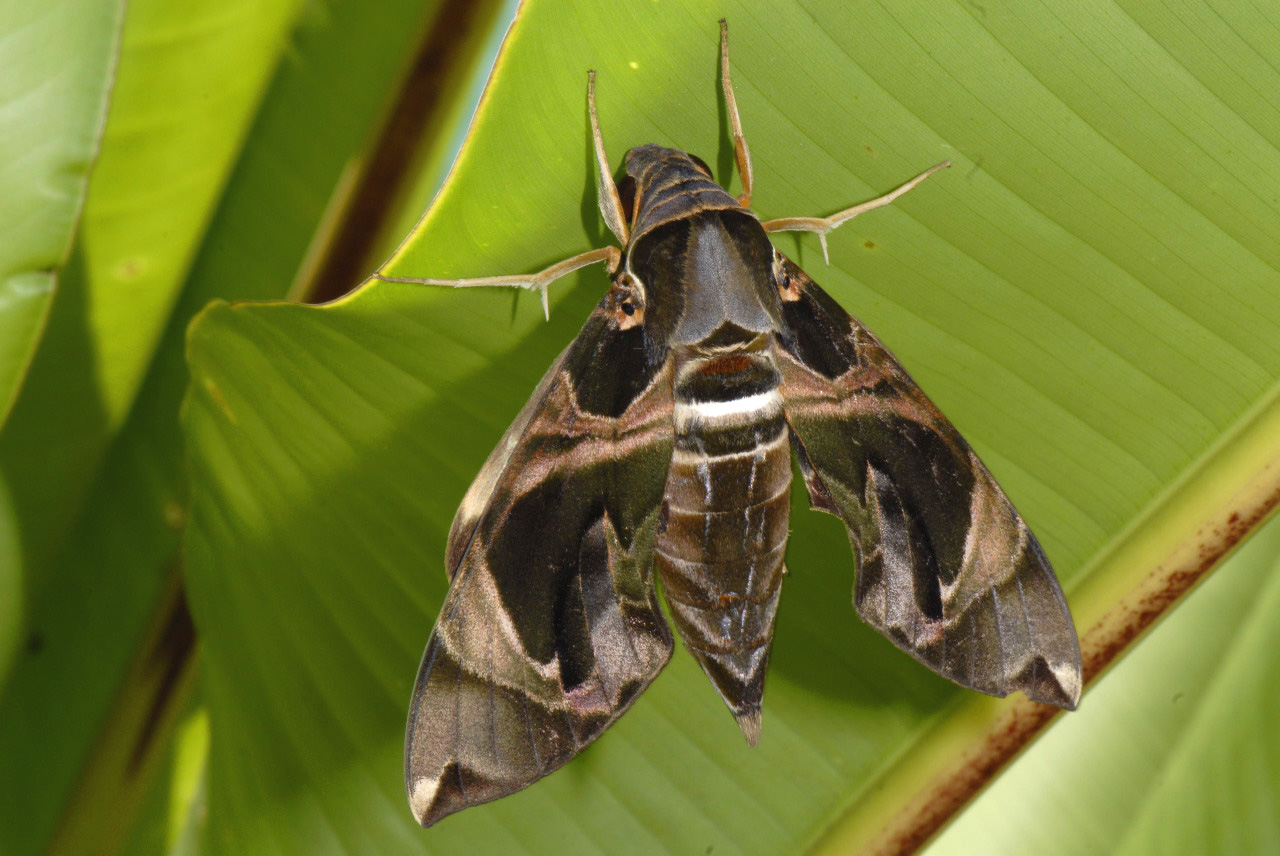
Daphnis hypothous

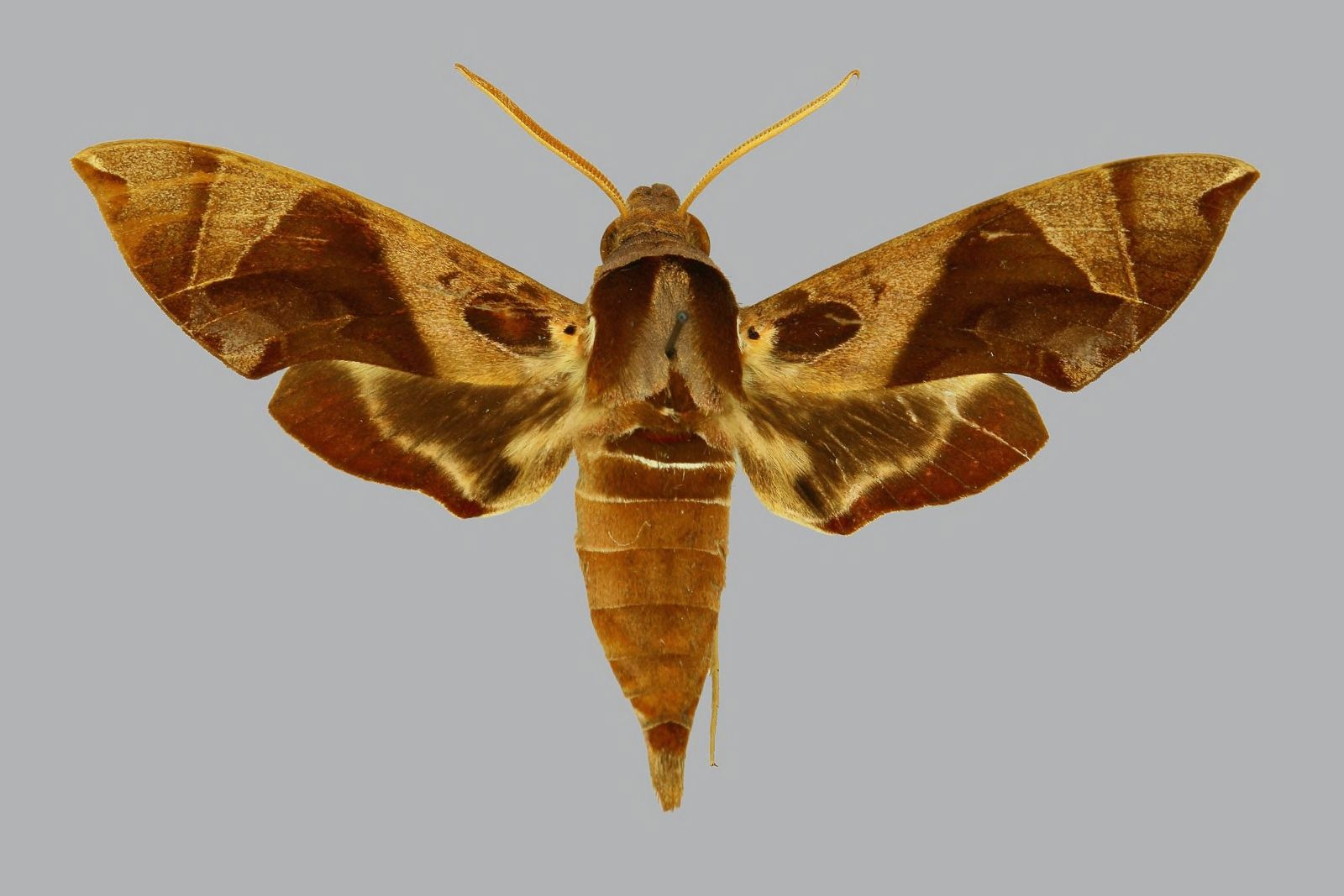
Daphnis layardii male

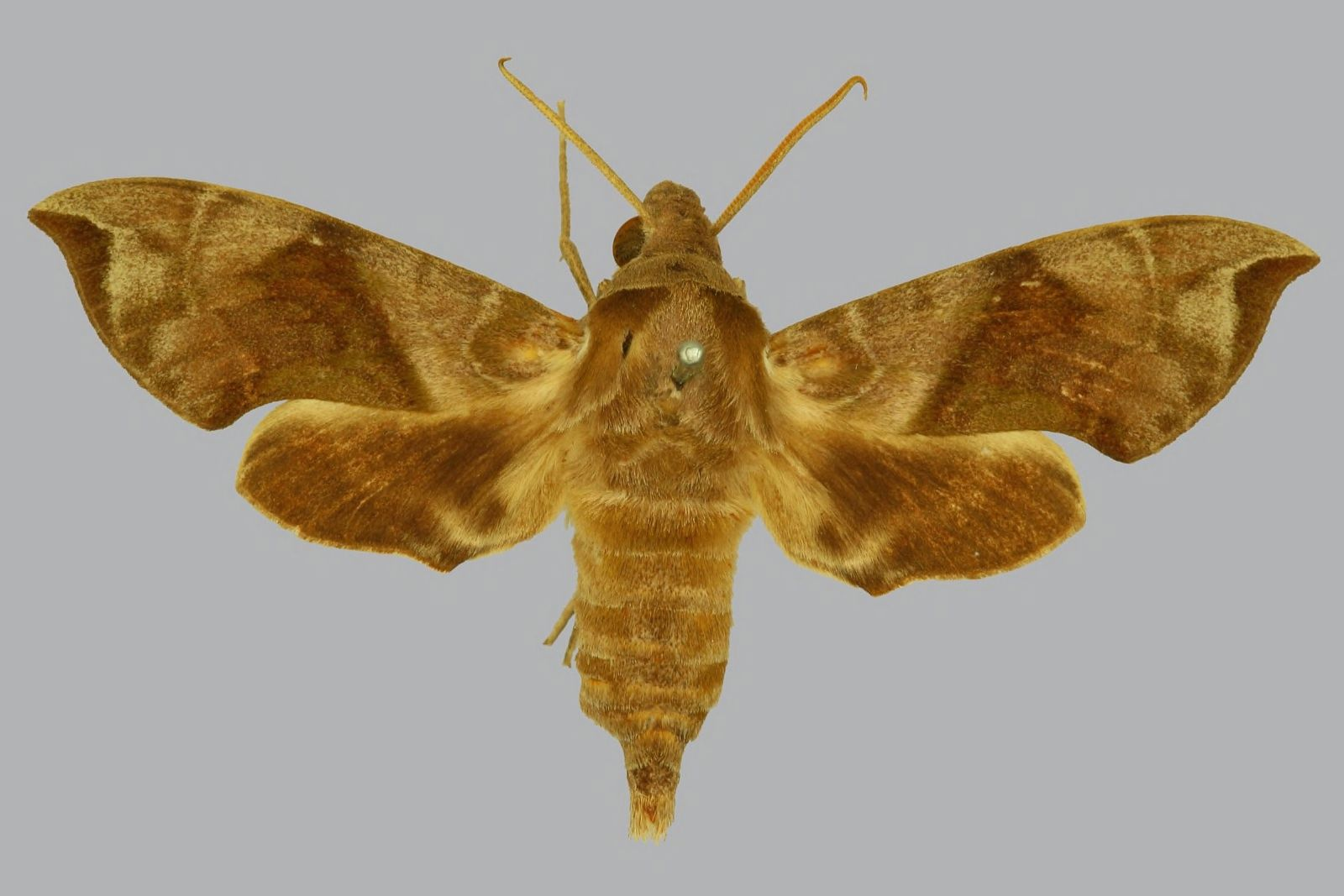
Daphnis minima male

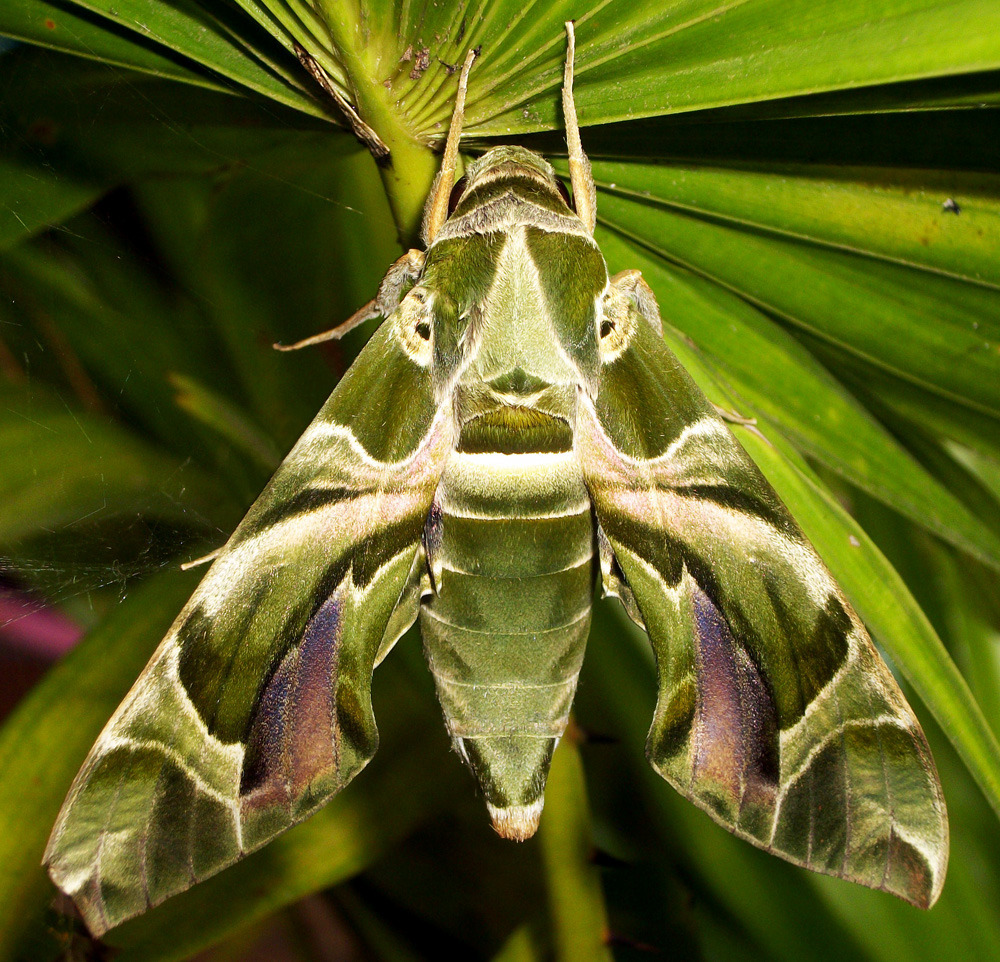
Daphnis nerii

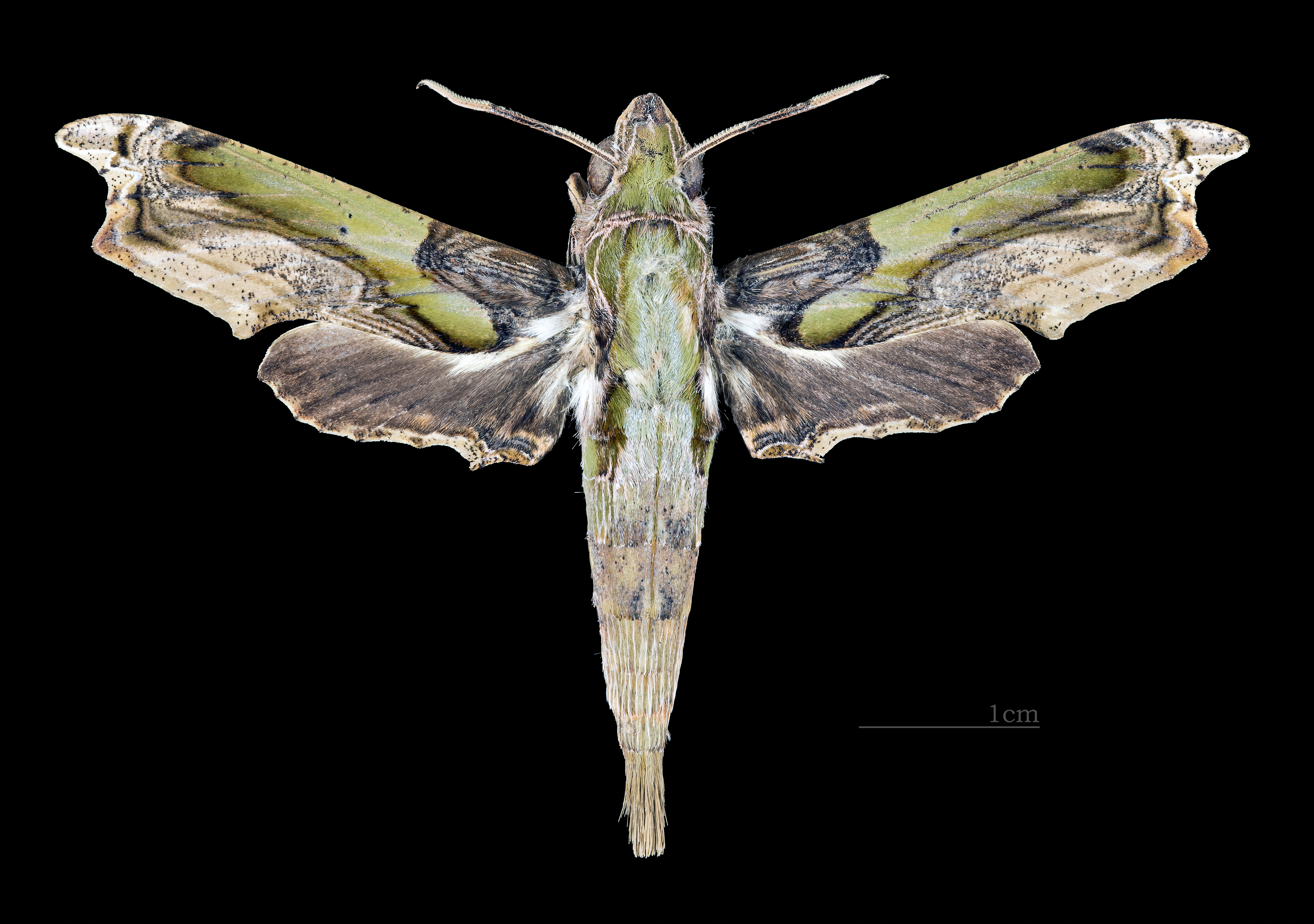
Eupanacra busiris

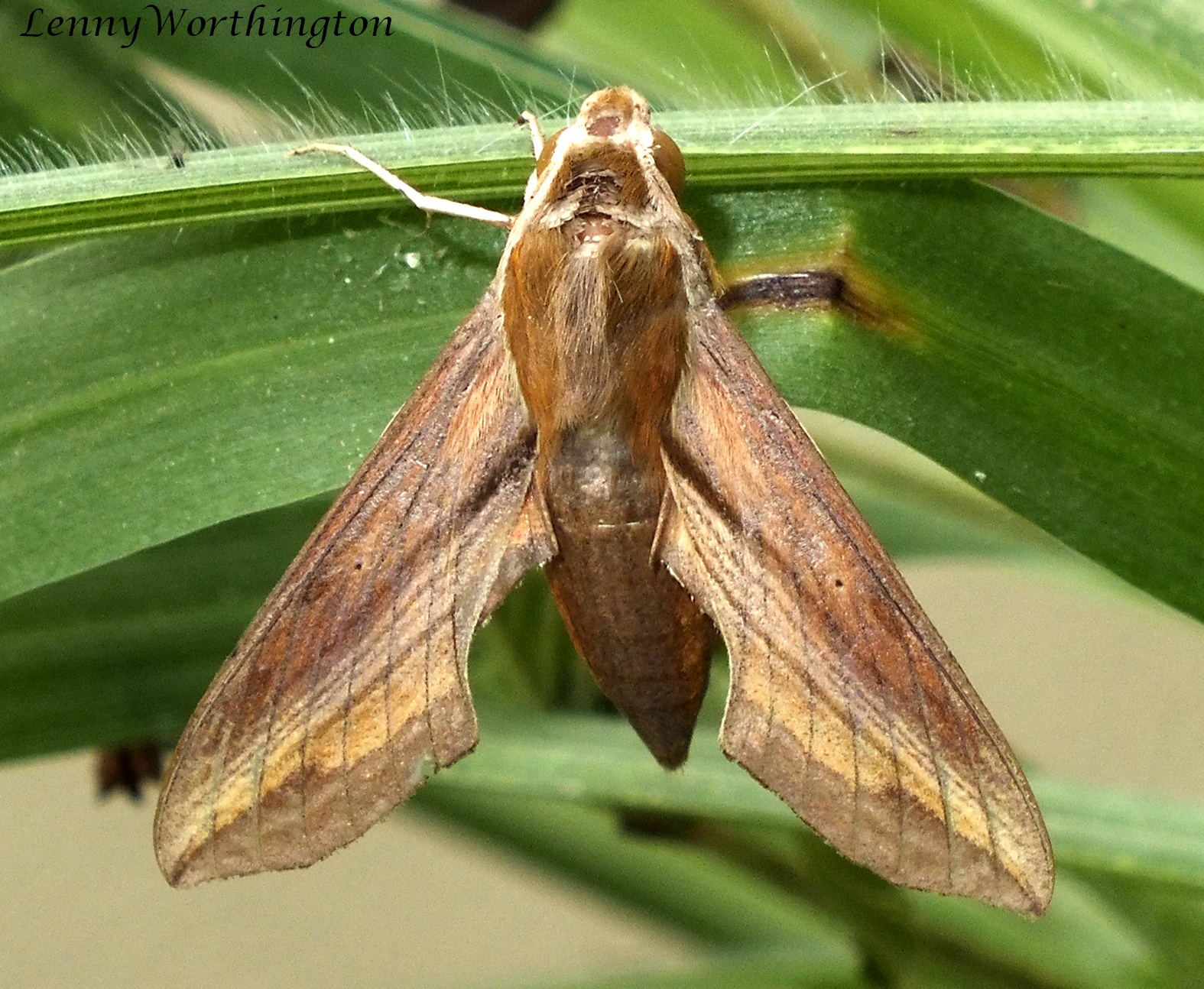
Hippotion boerhaviae

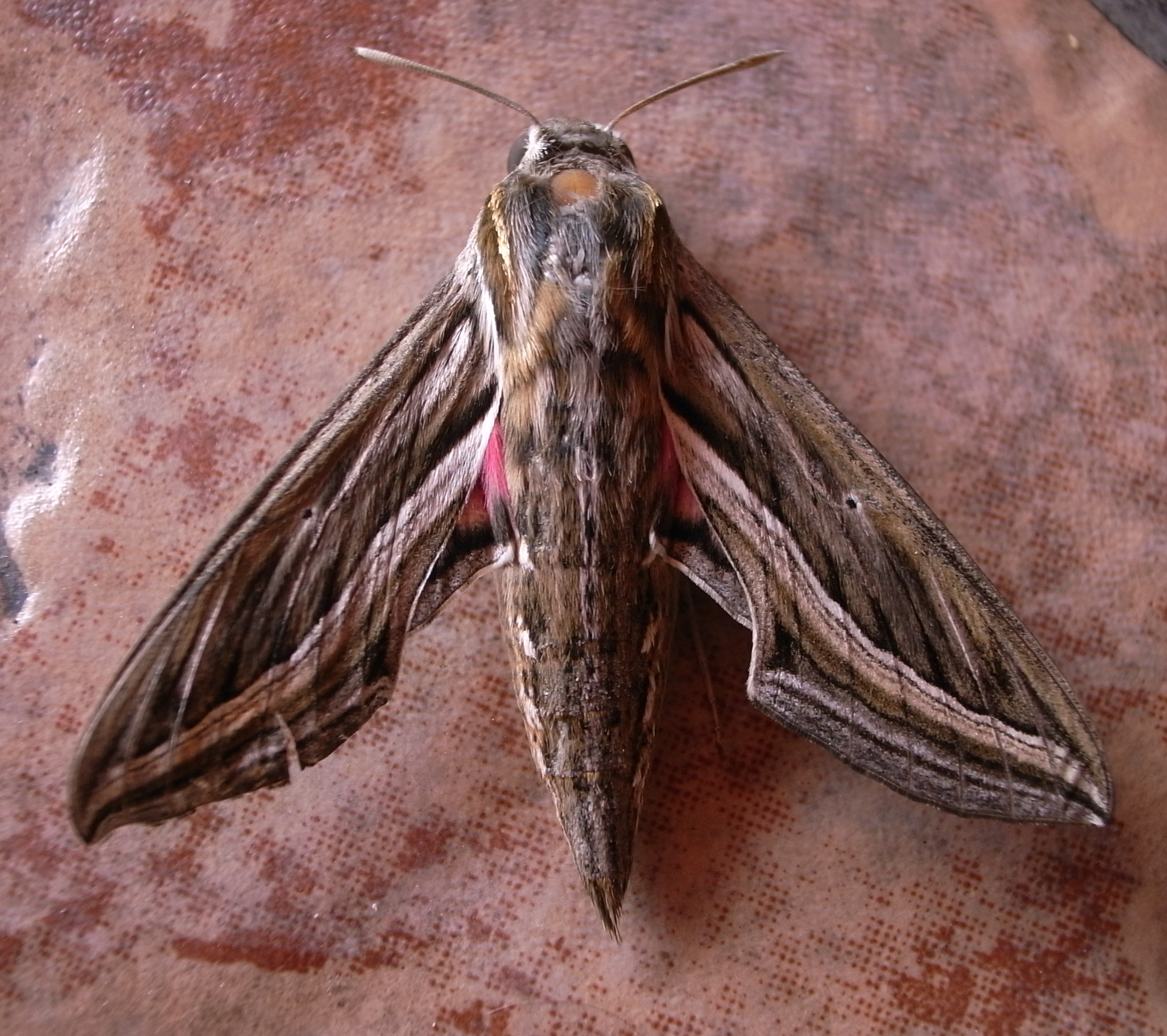
Hippotion celerio

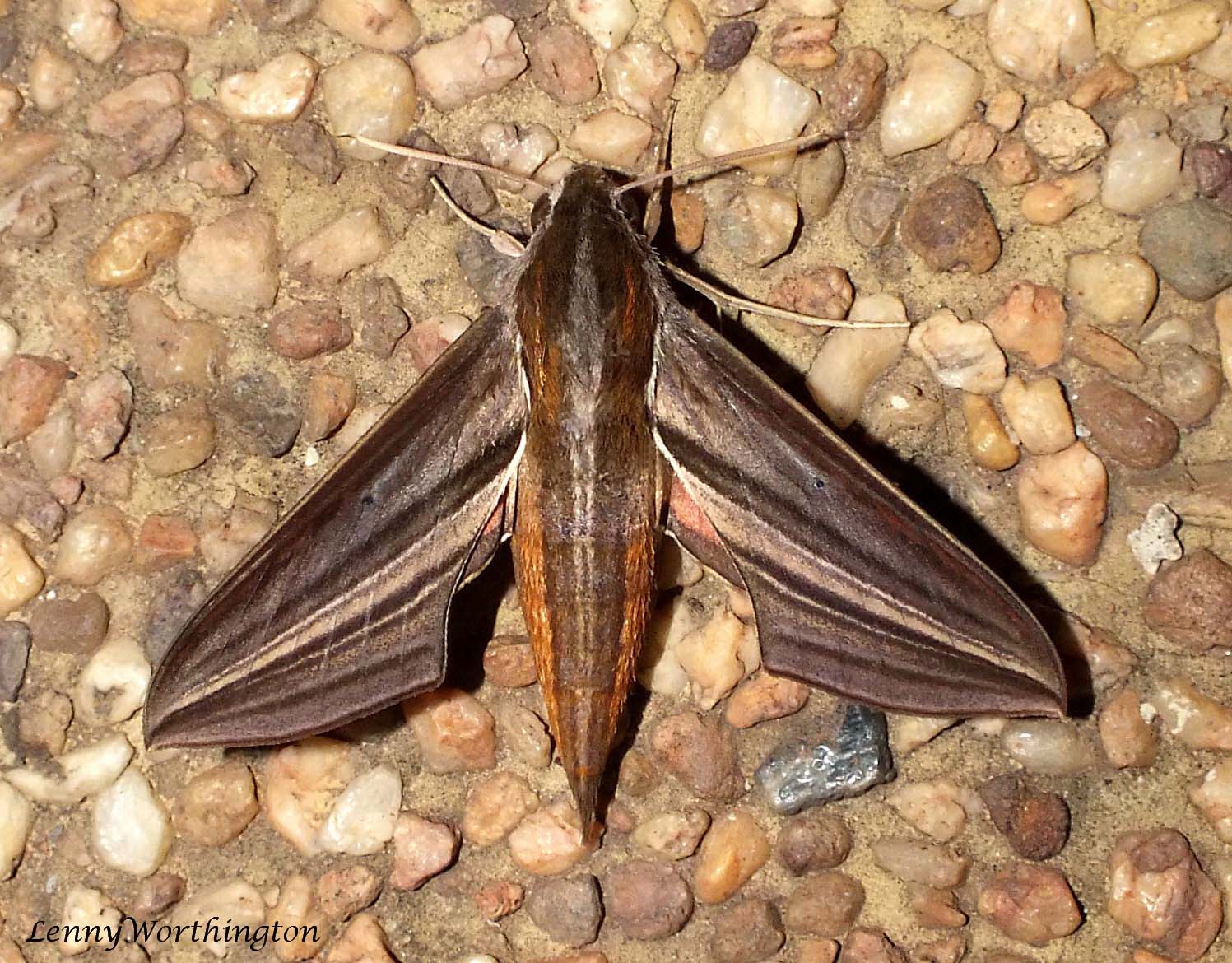
Hippotion rafflesii

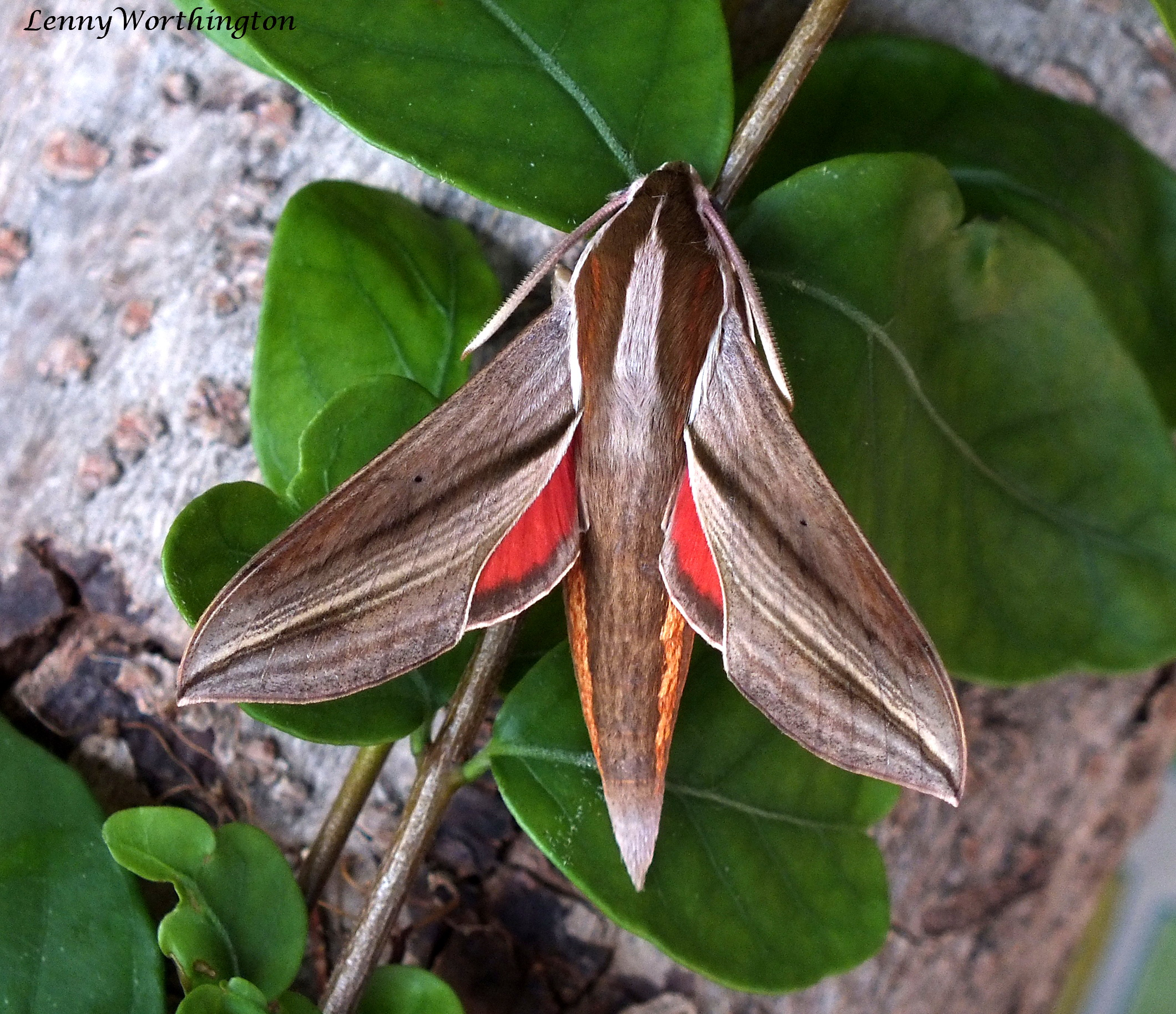
Hippotion rosetta

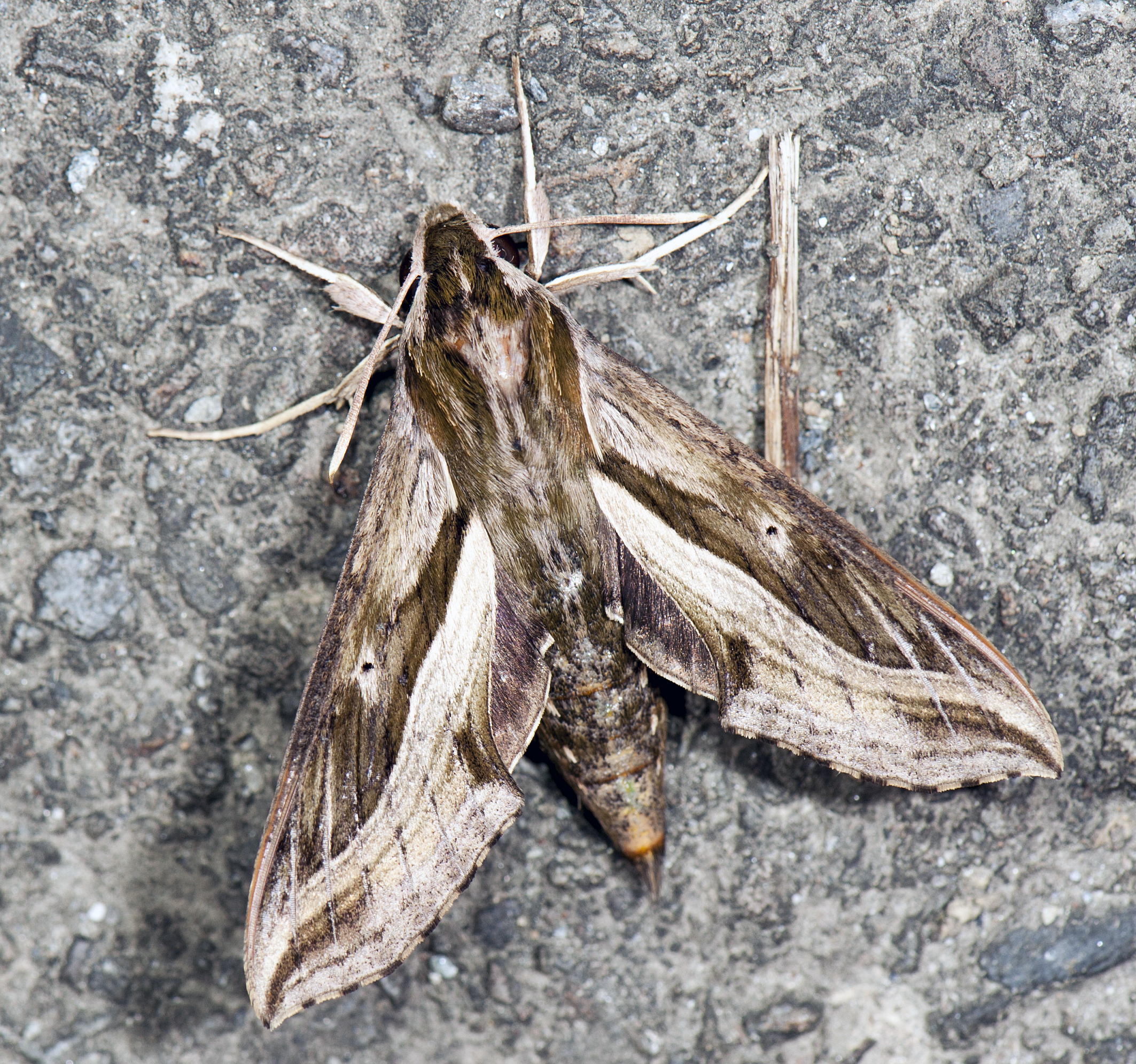
Hippotion velox

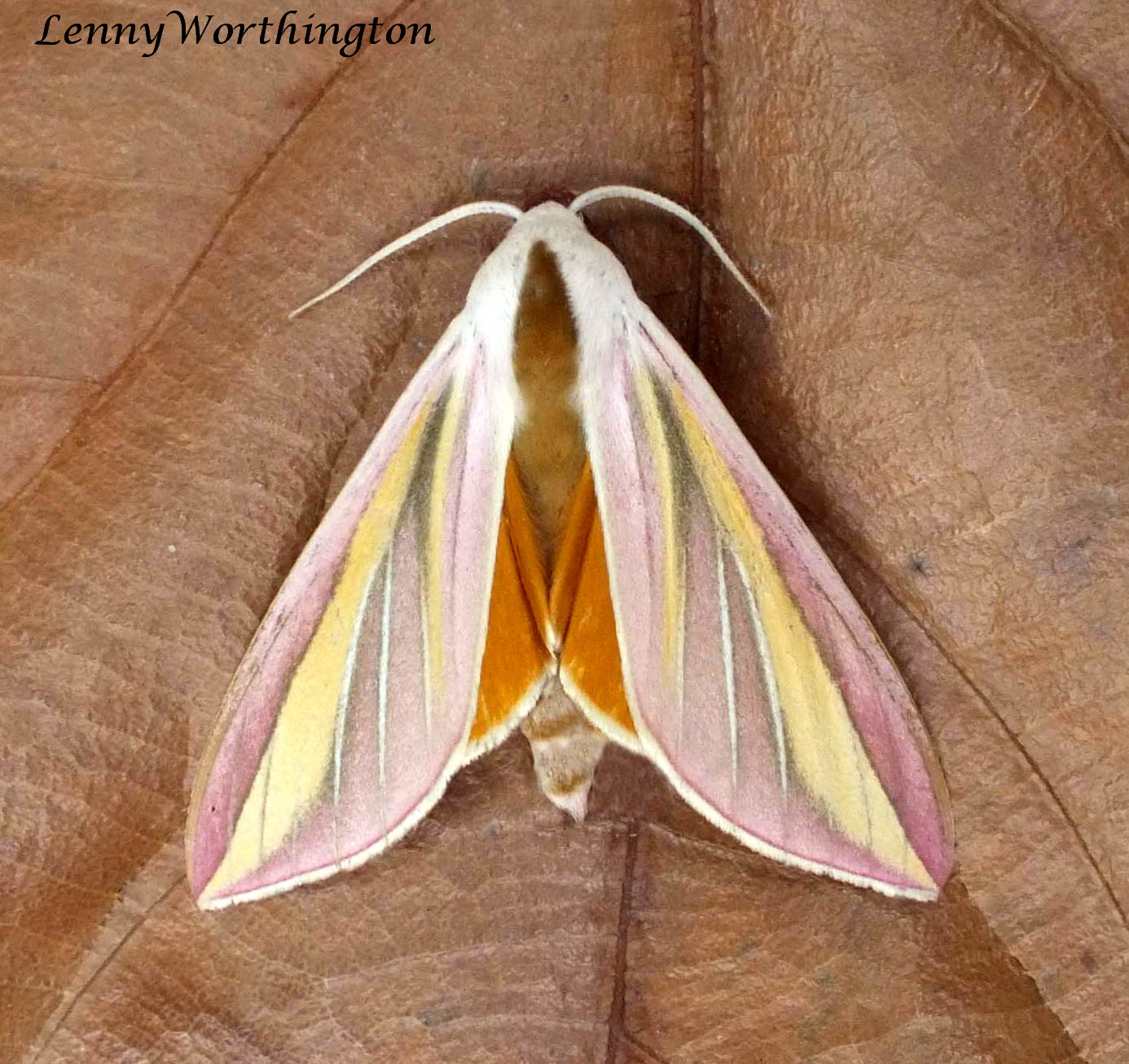
Leucophlebia lineata

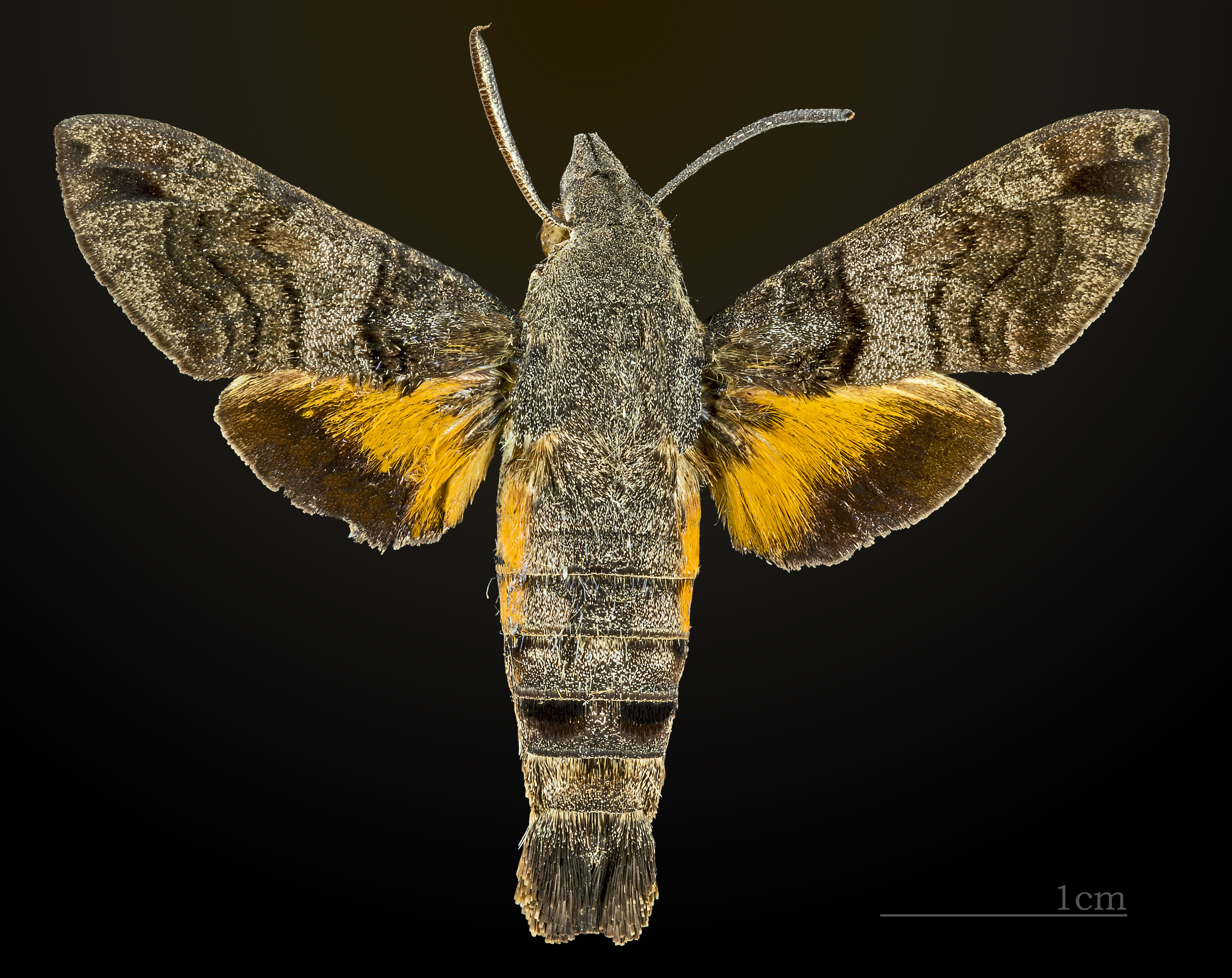
Macroglossum affictitia

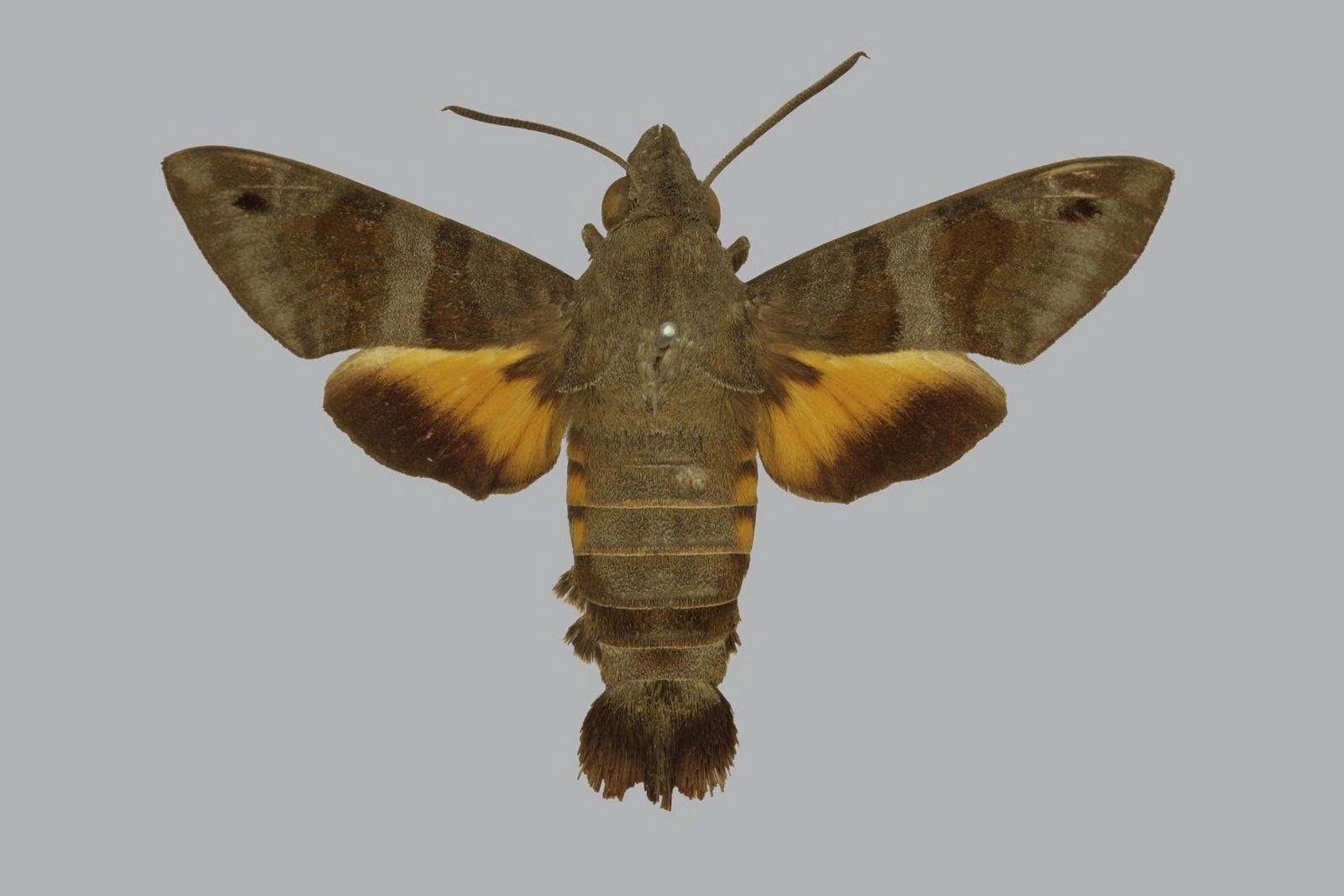
Macroglossum assimilis male

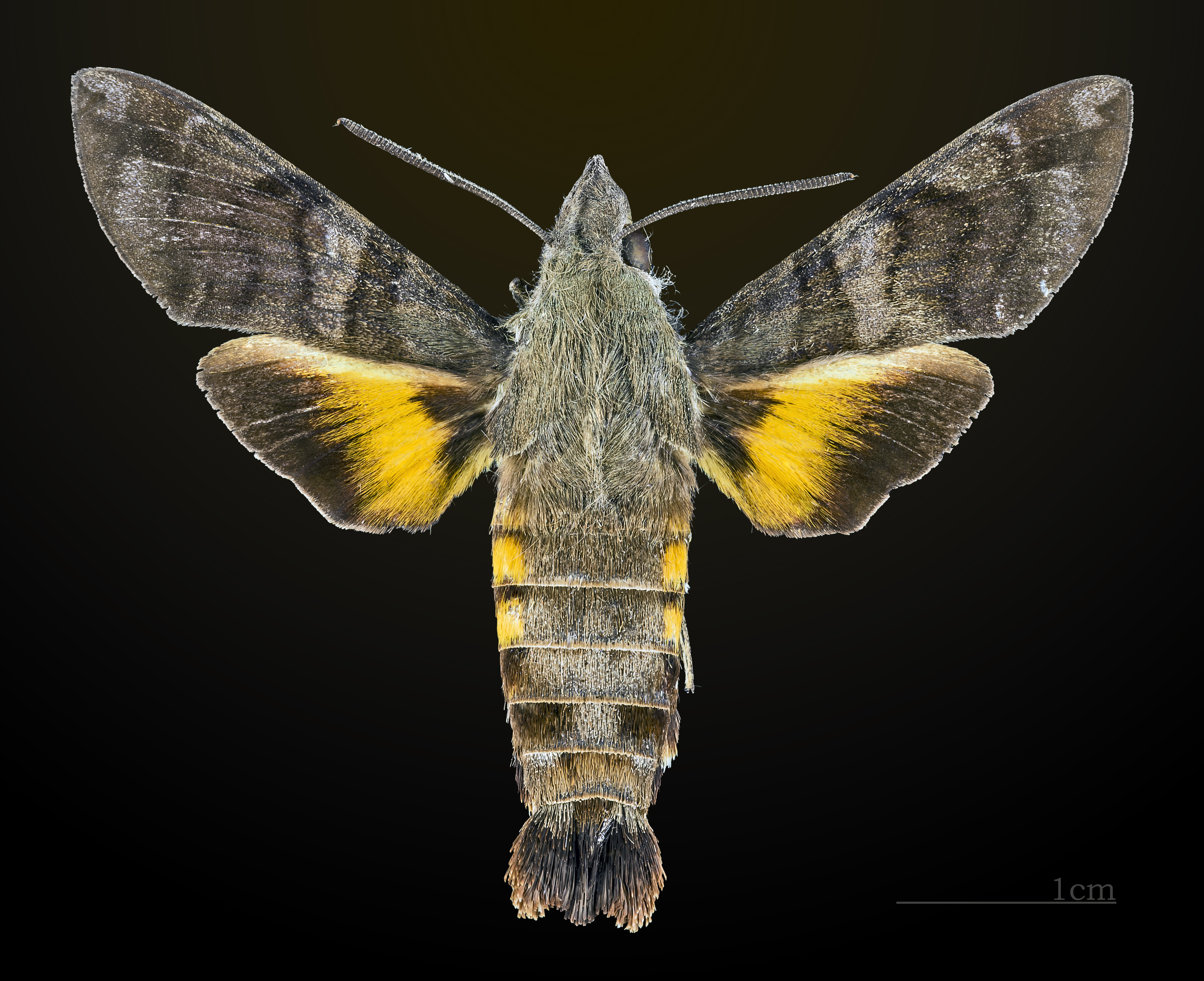
Macroglossum belis

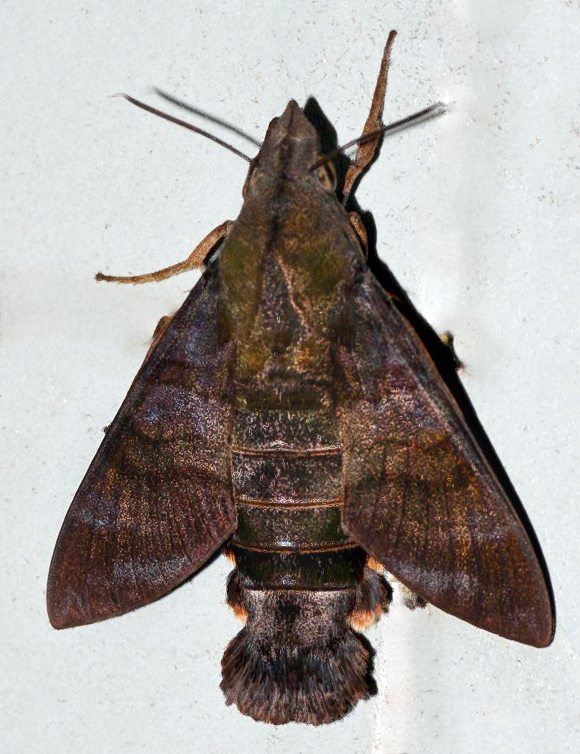
Macroglossum corythus

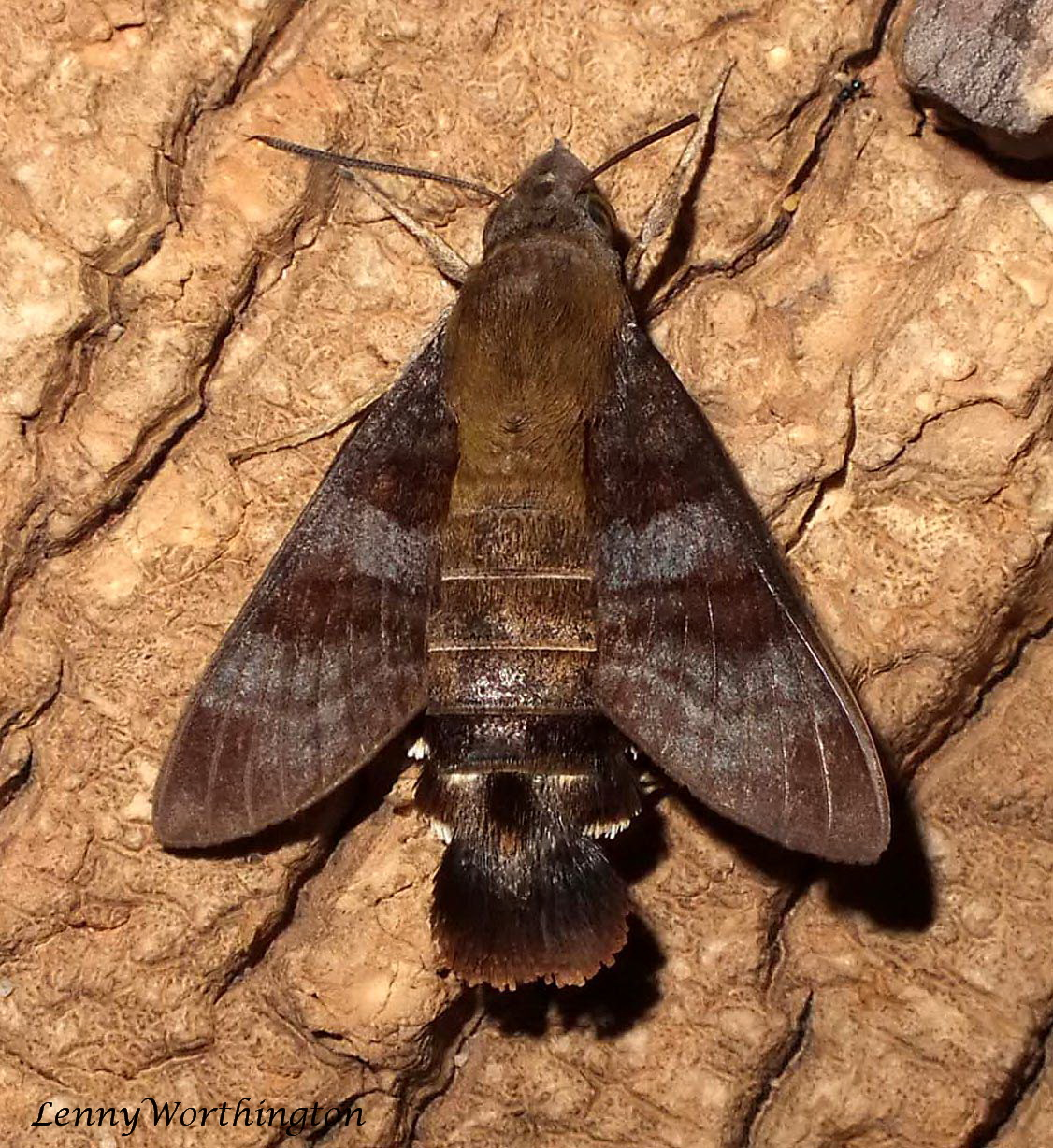
Macroglossum glaucoptera

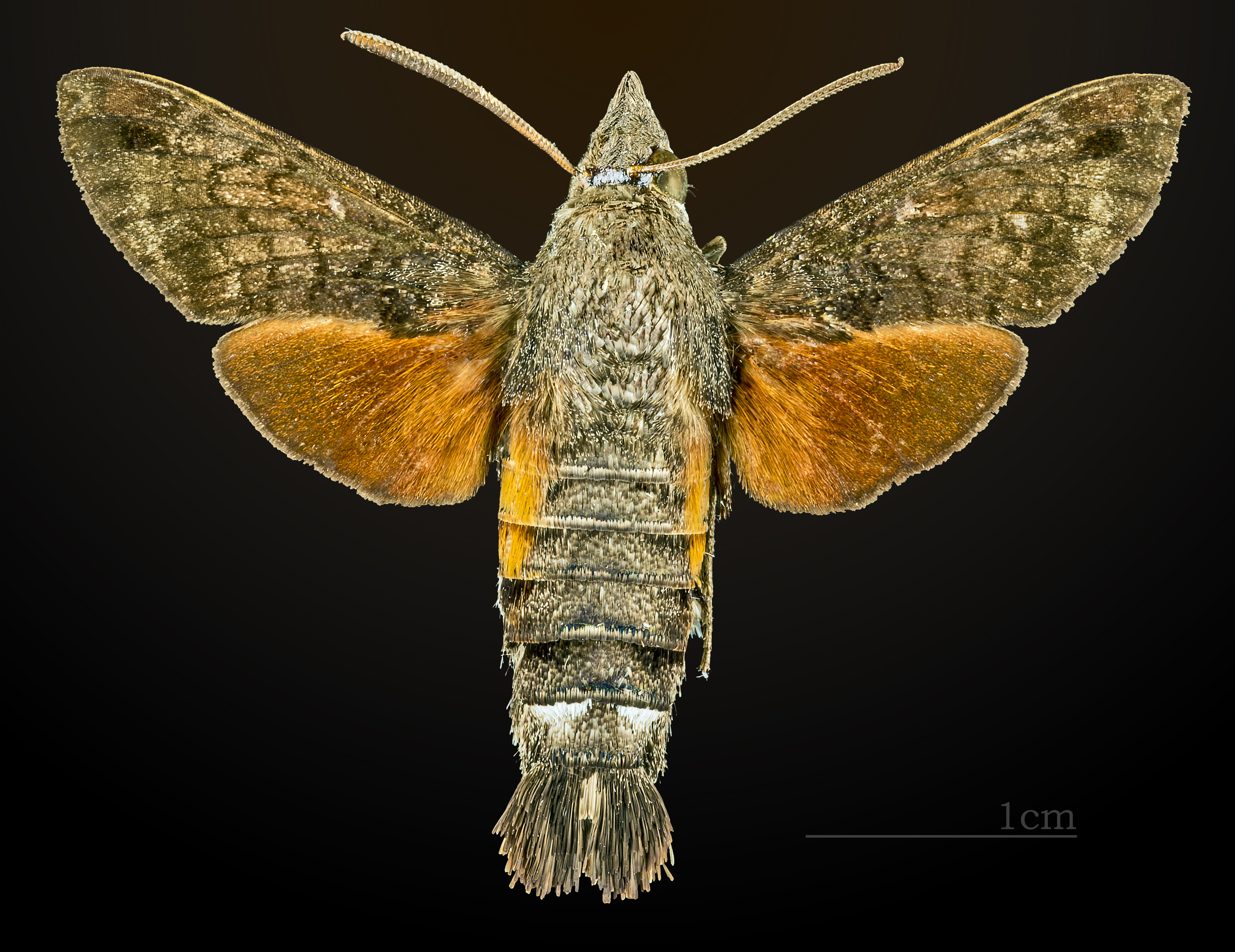
Macroglossum gyrans

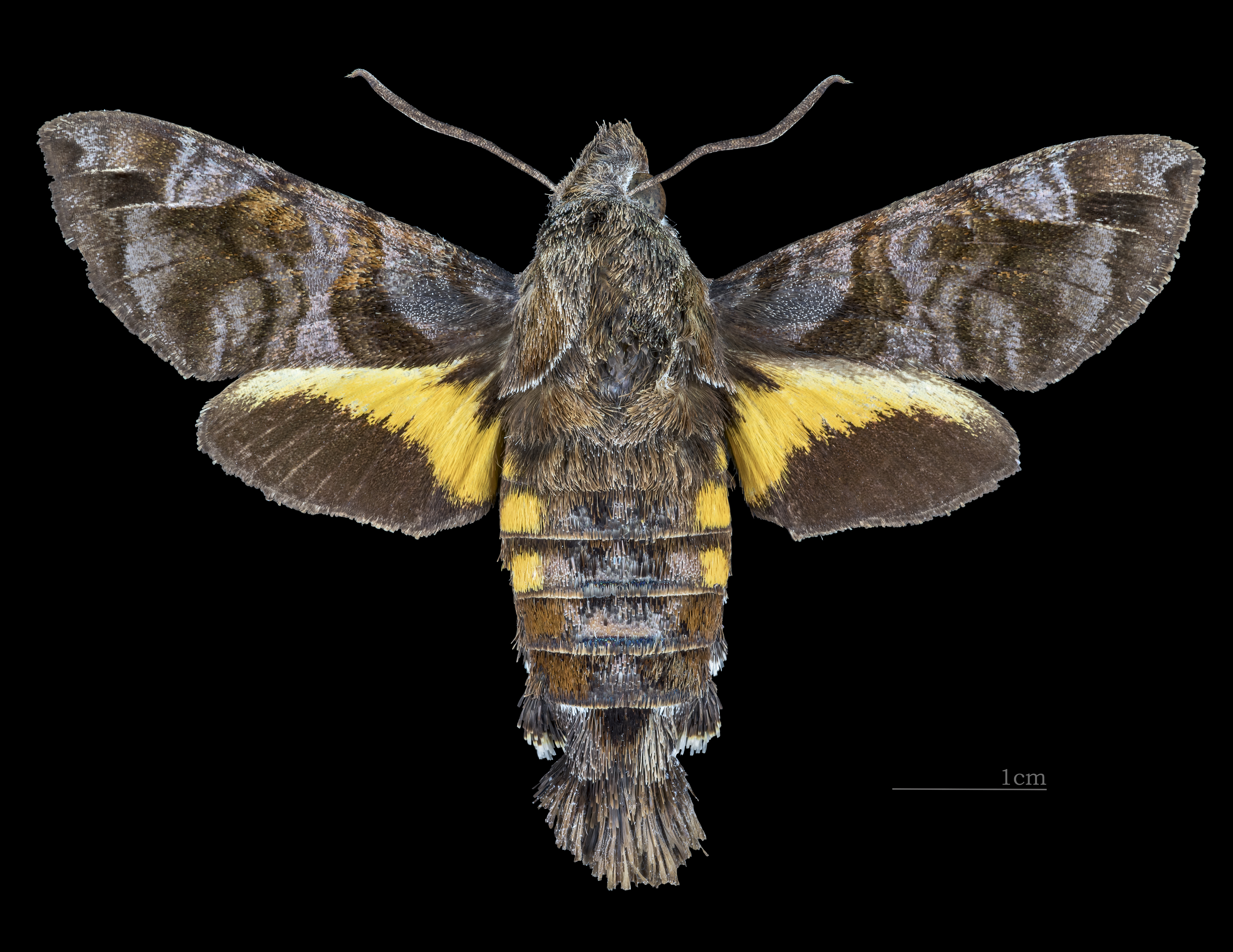
Macroglossum insipida

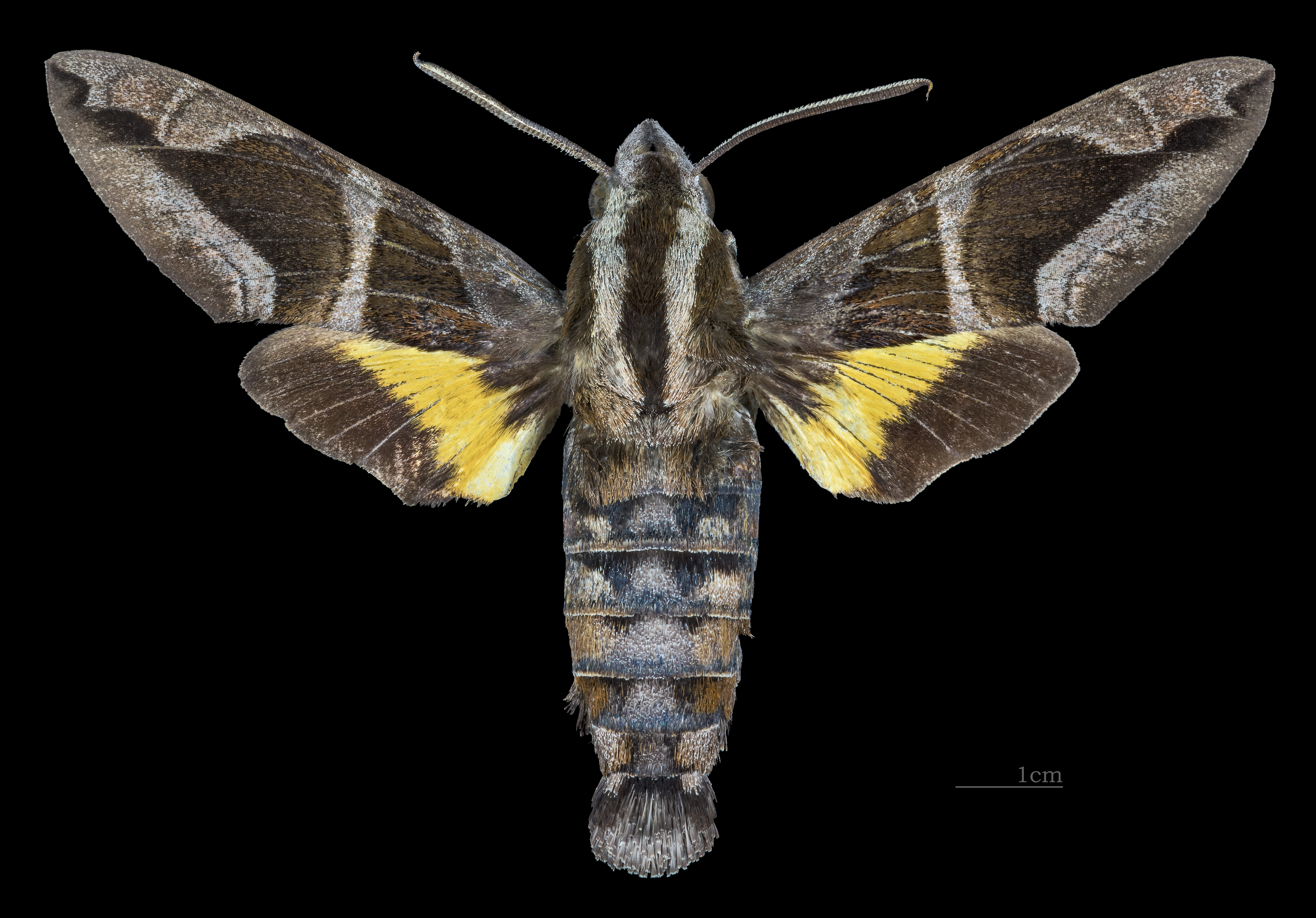
Macroglossum mitchellii male

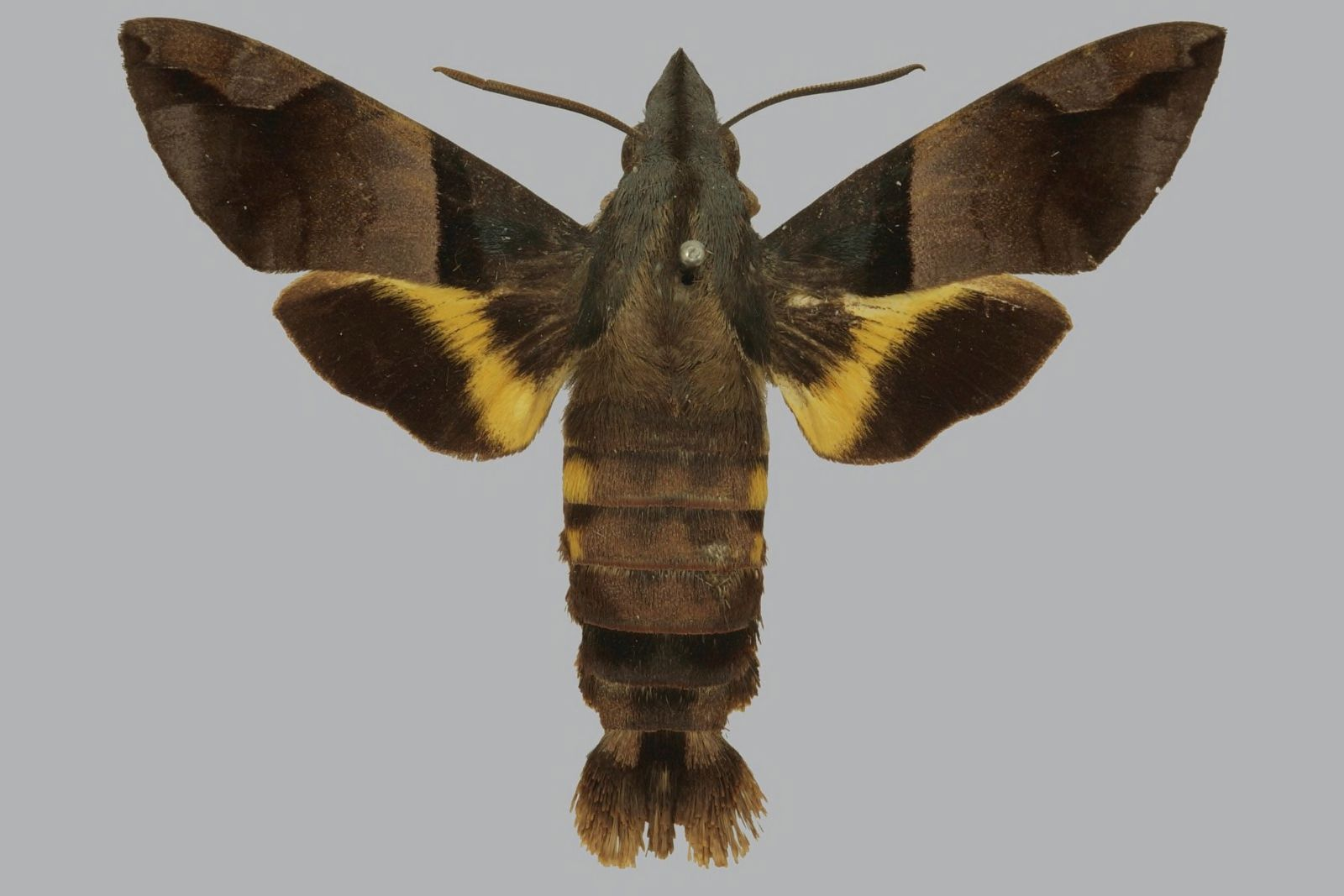
Macroglossum passalus male

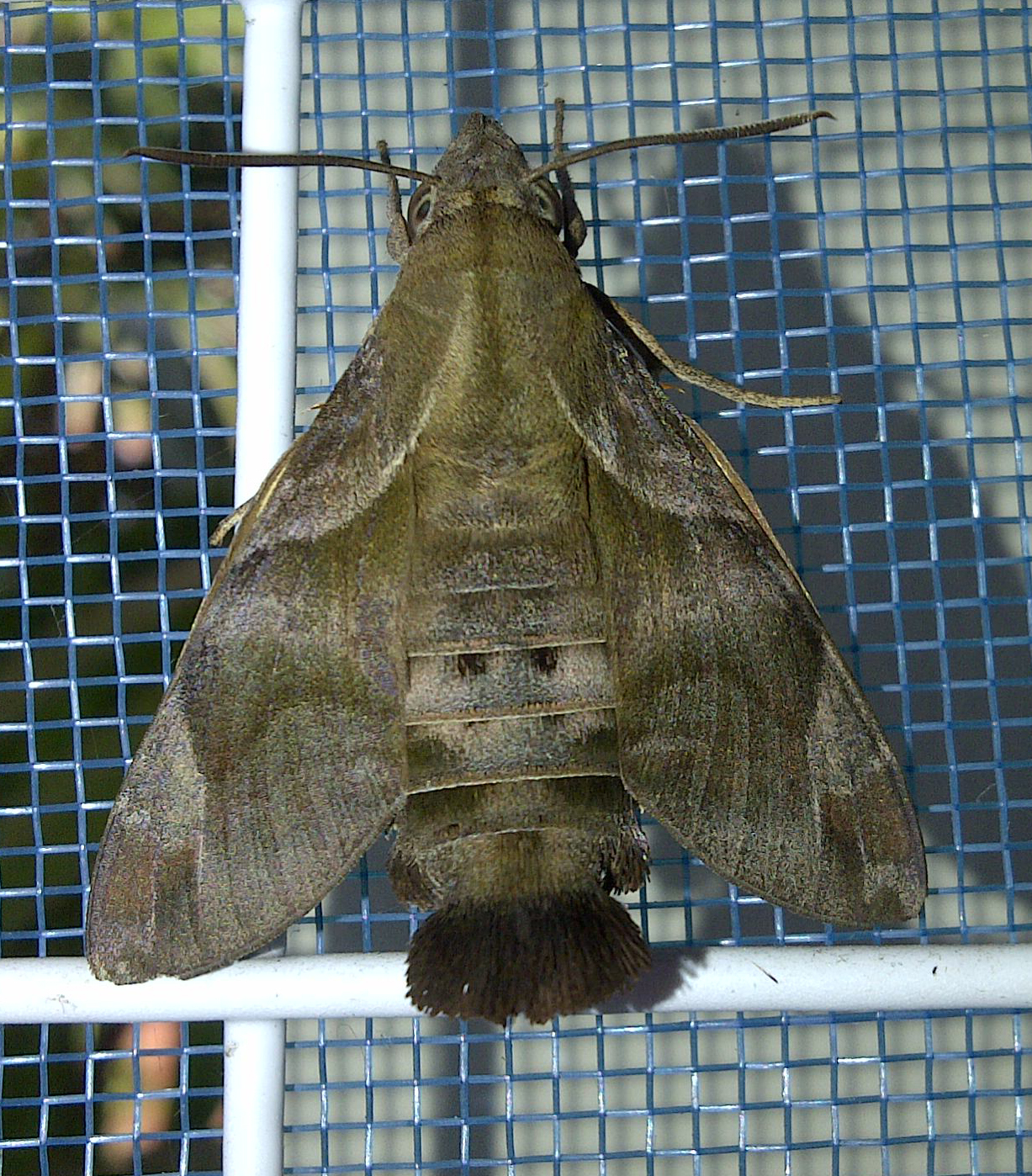
Macroglossum prometheus

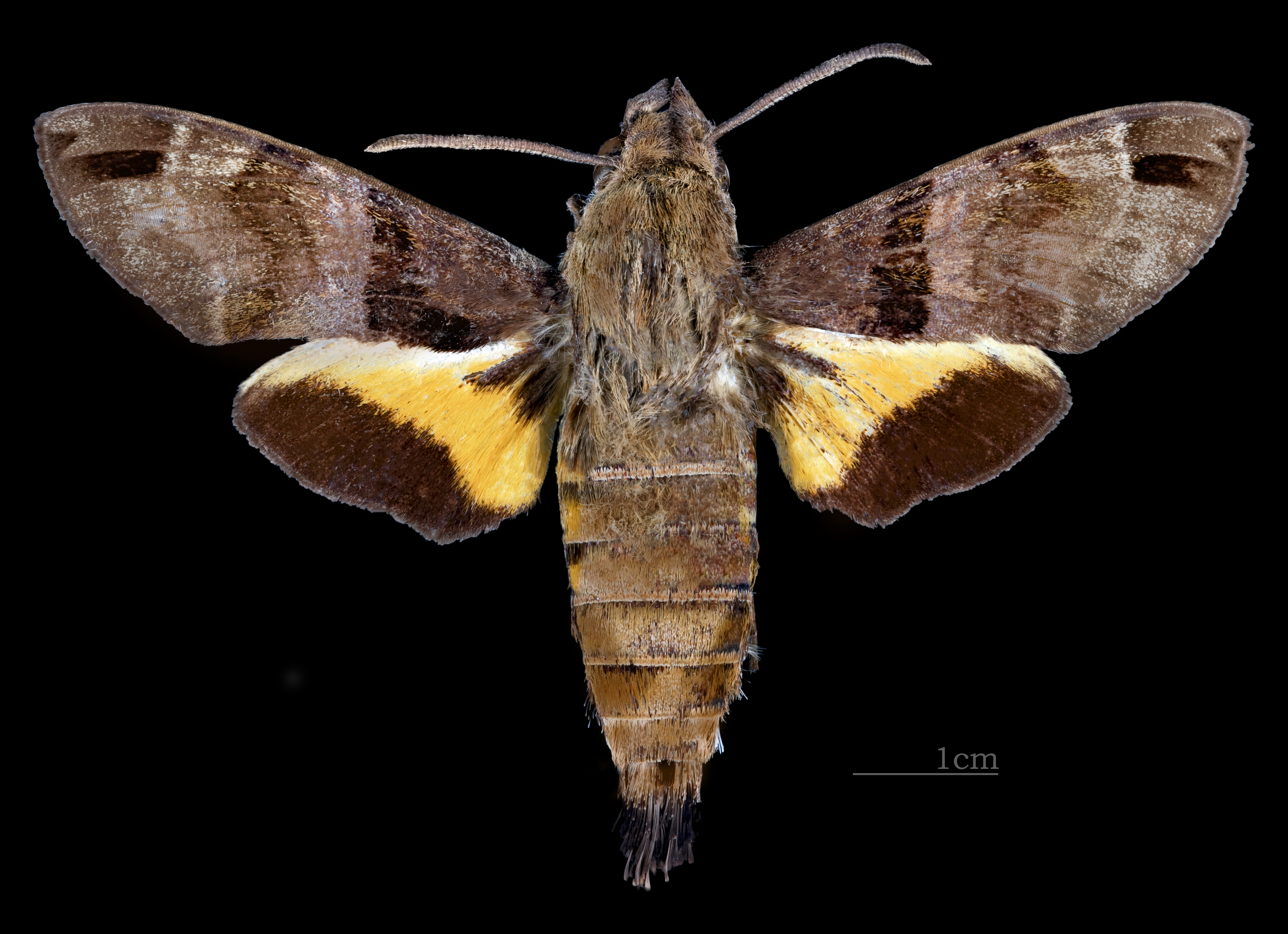
Macroglossum pyrrhosticta male

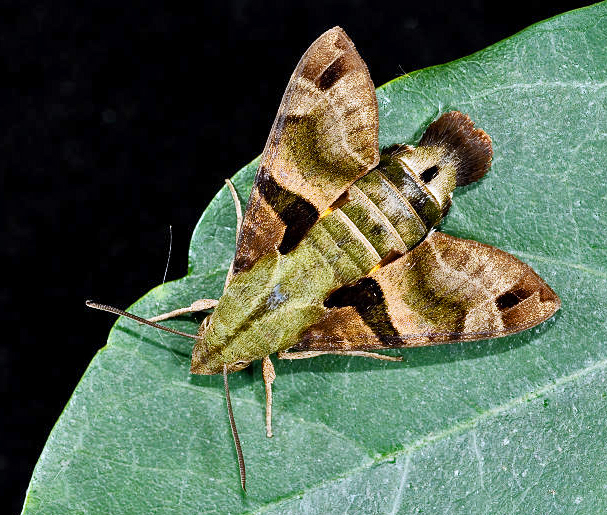
Macroglossum sitiene

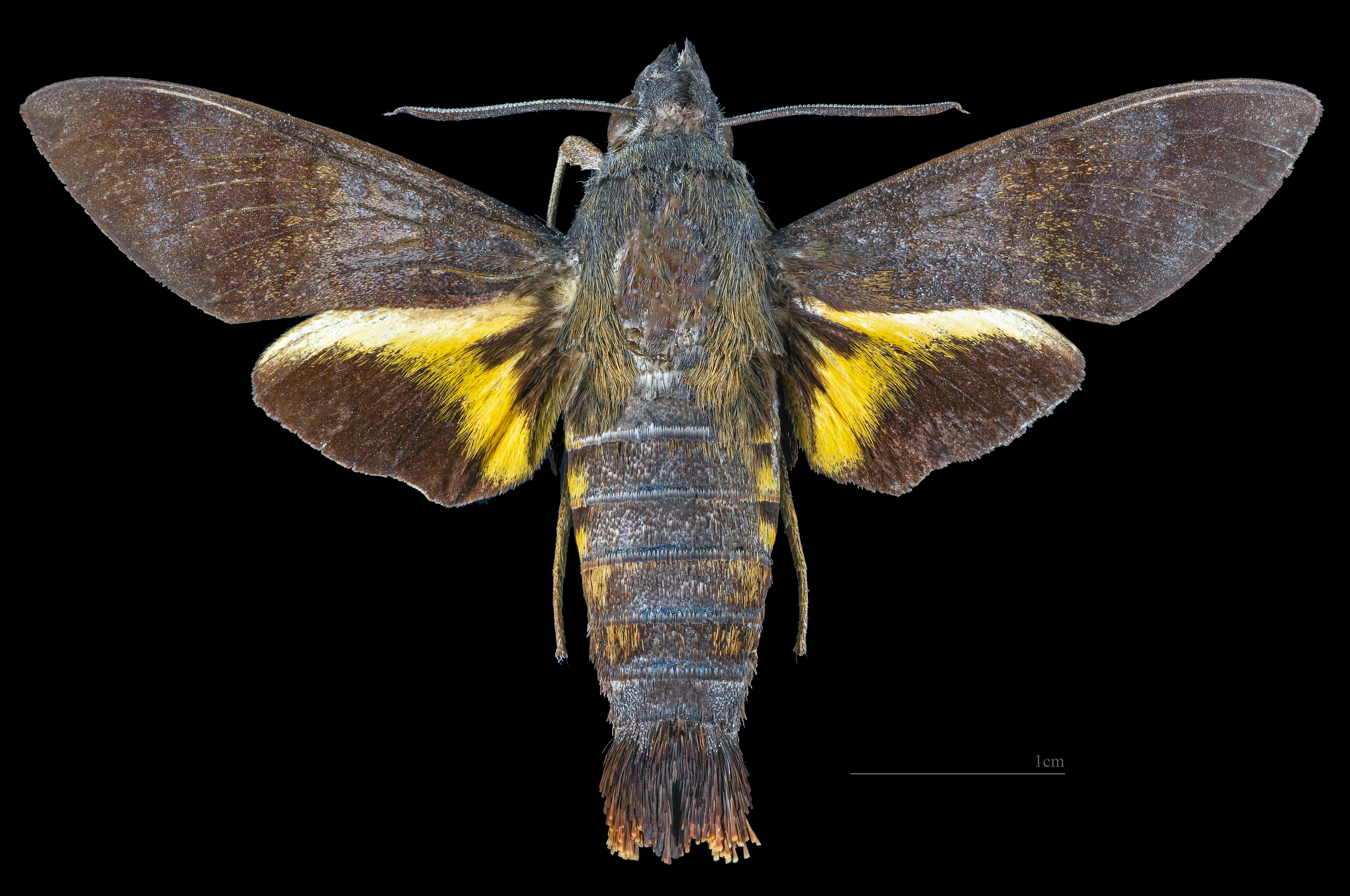
Macroglossum sylvia male

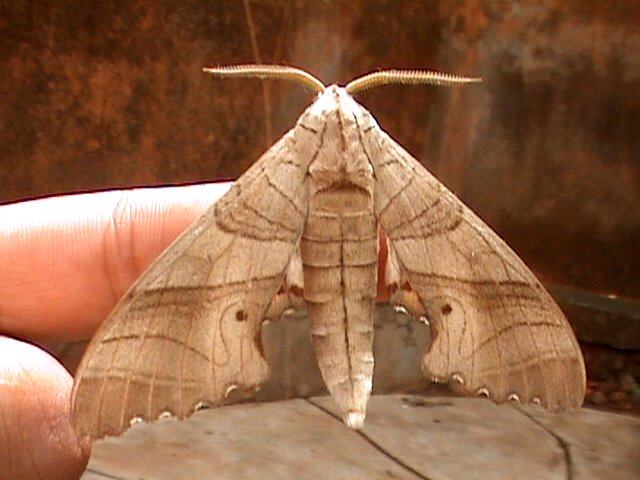
Marumba dryas male

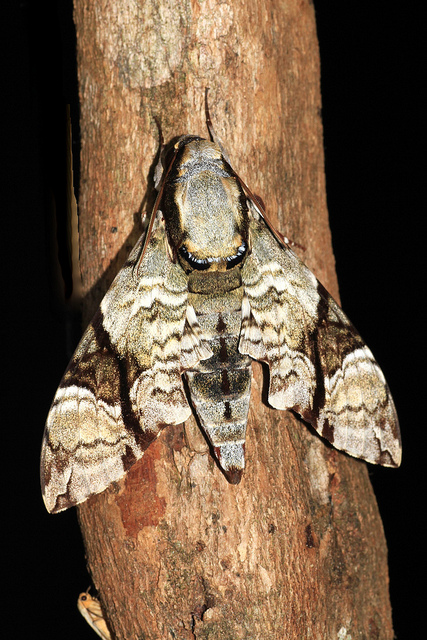
Megacorma obliqua

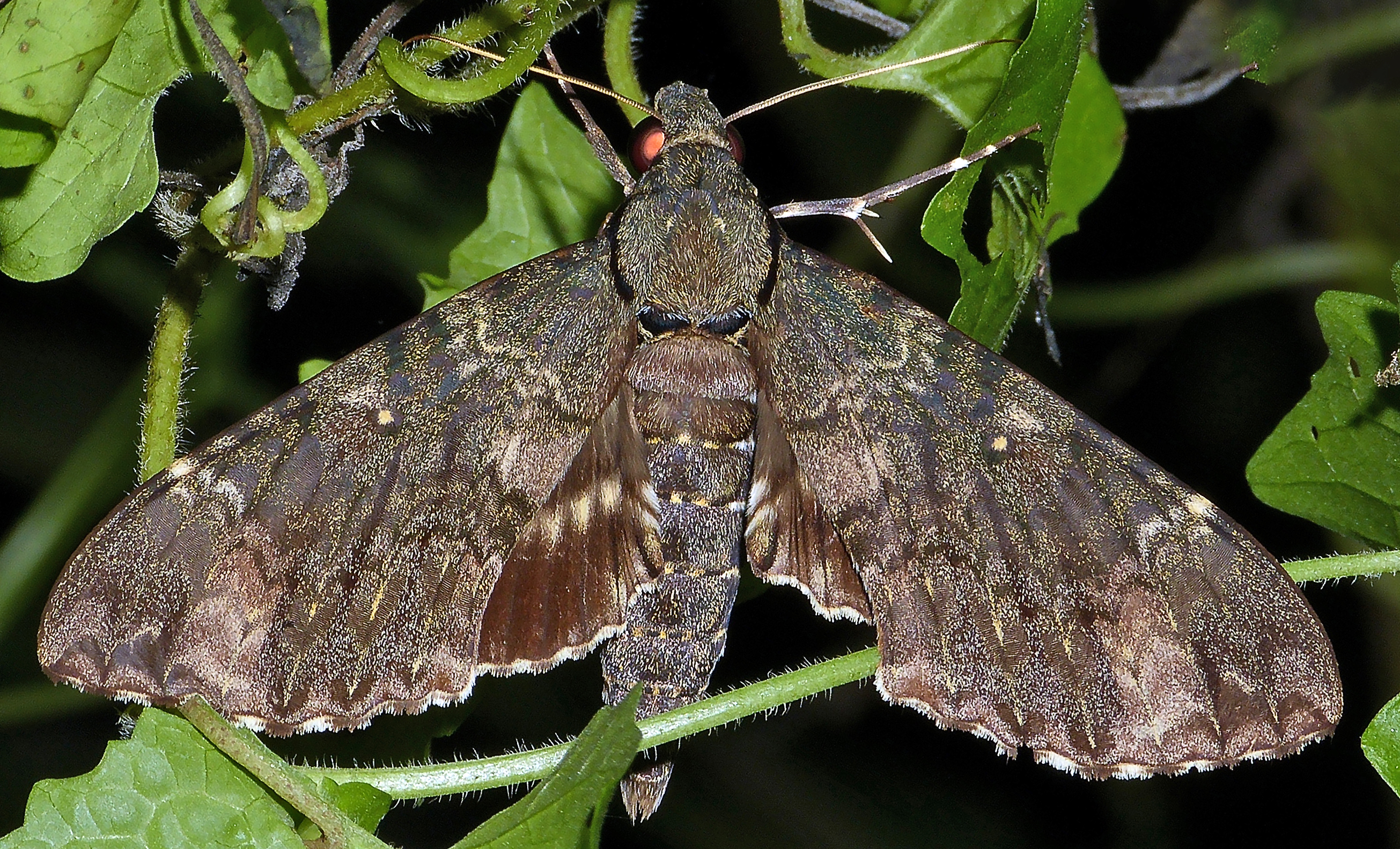
Meganoton nyctiphanes

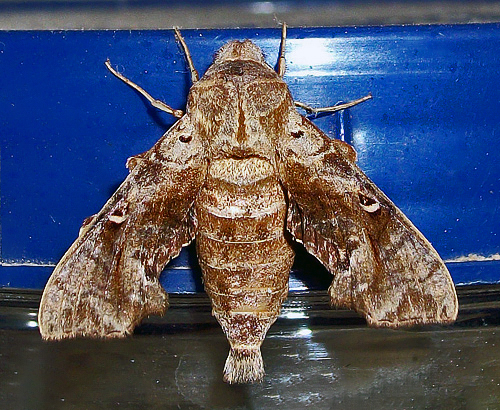
Neogurelca hyas

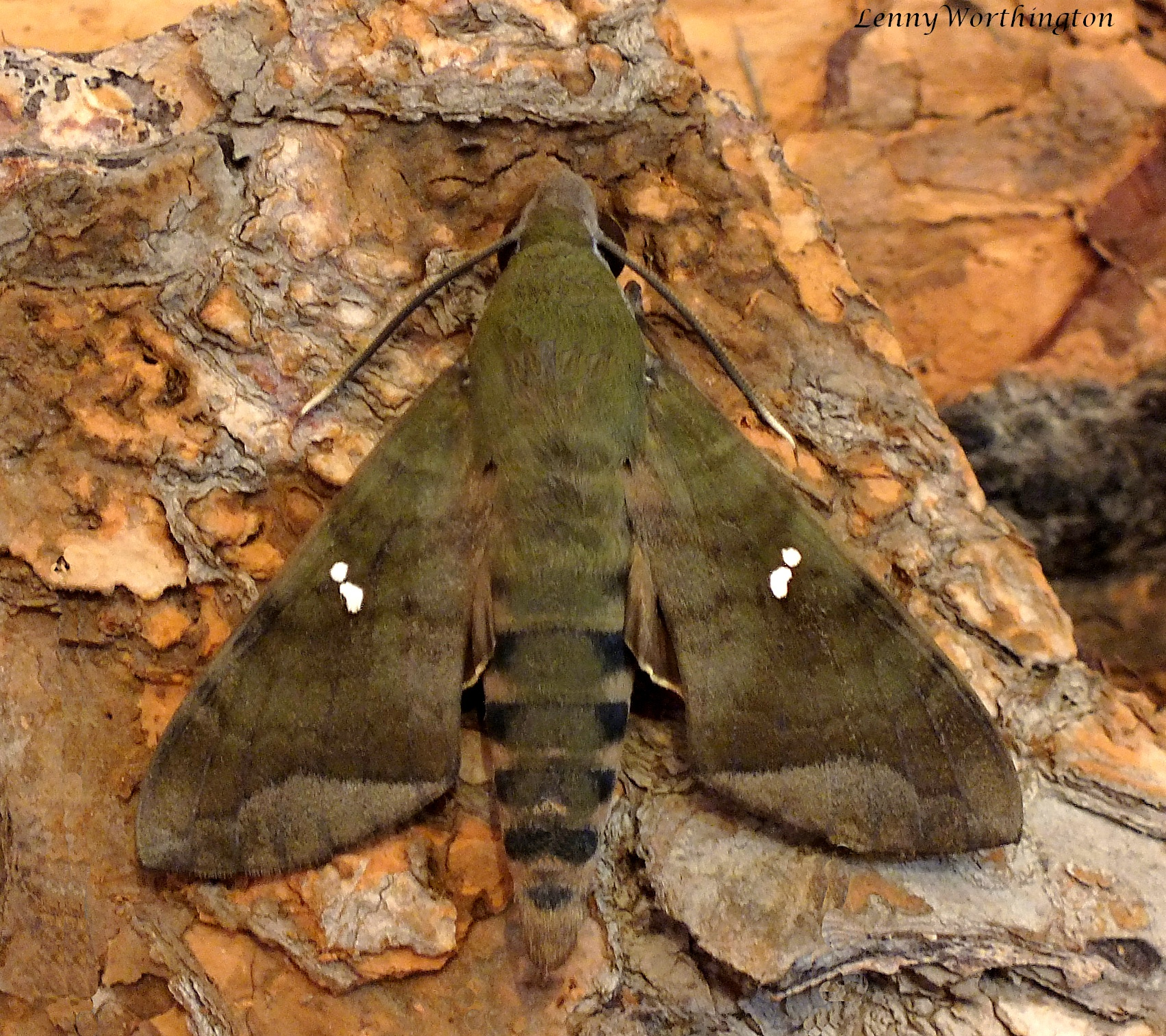
Nephele hespera male

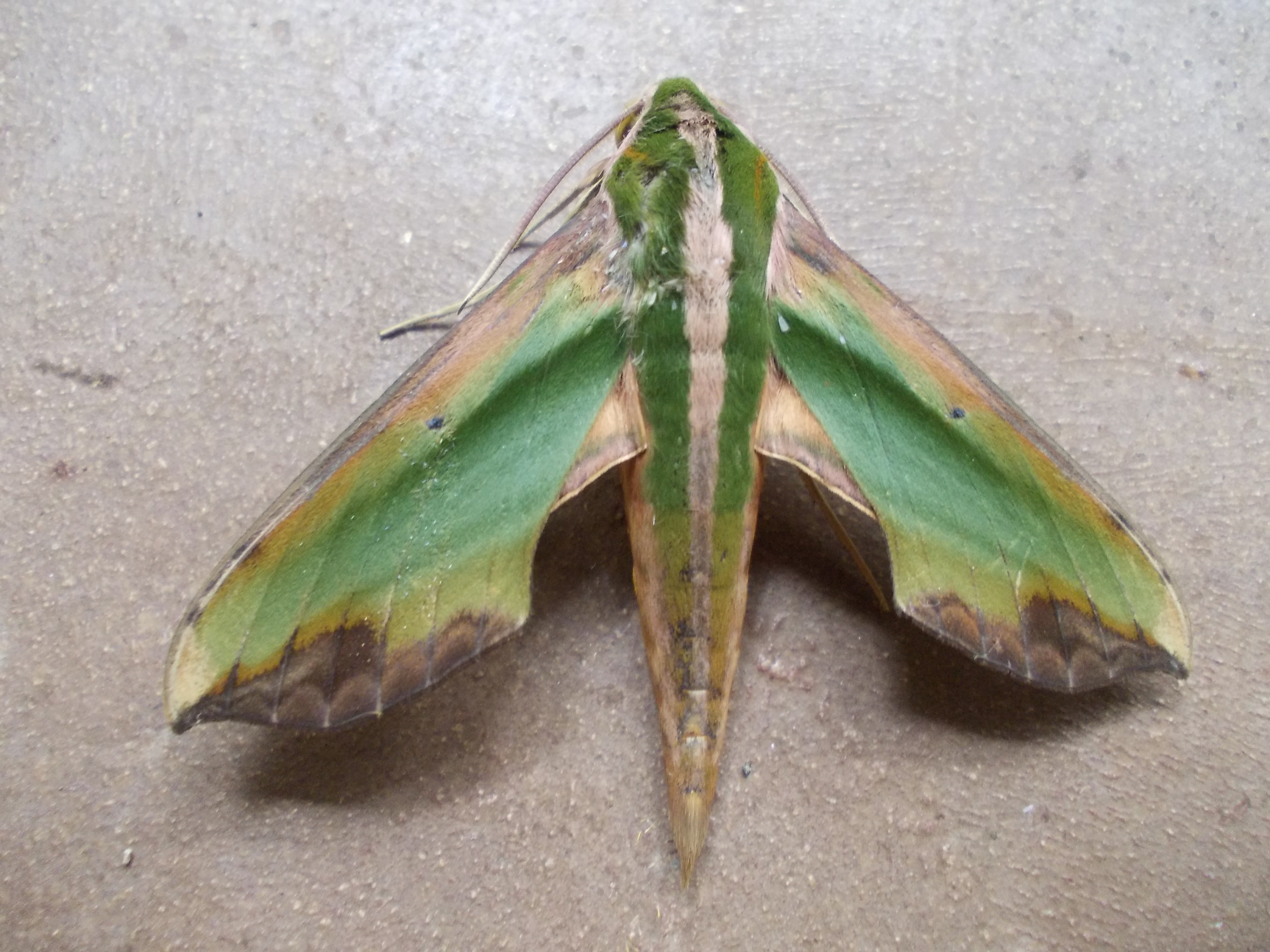
Pergesa acteus

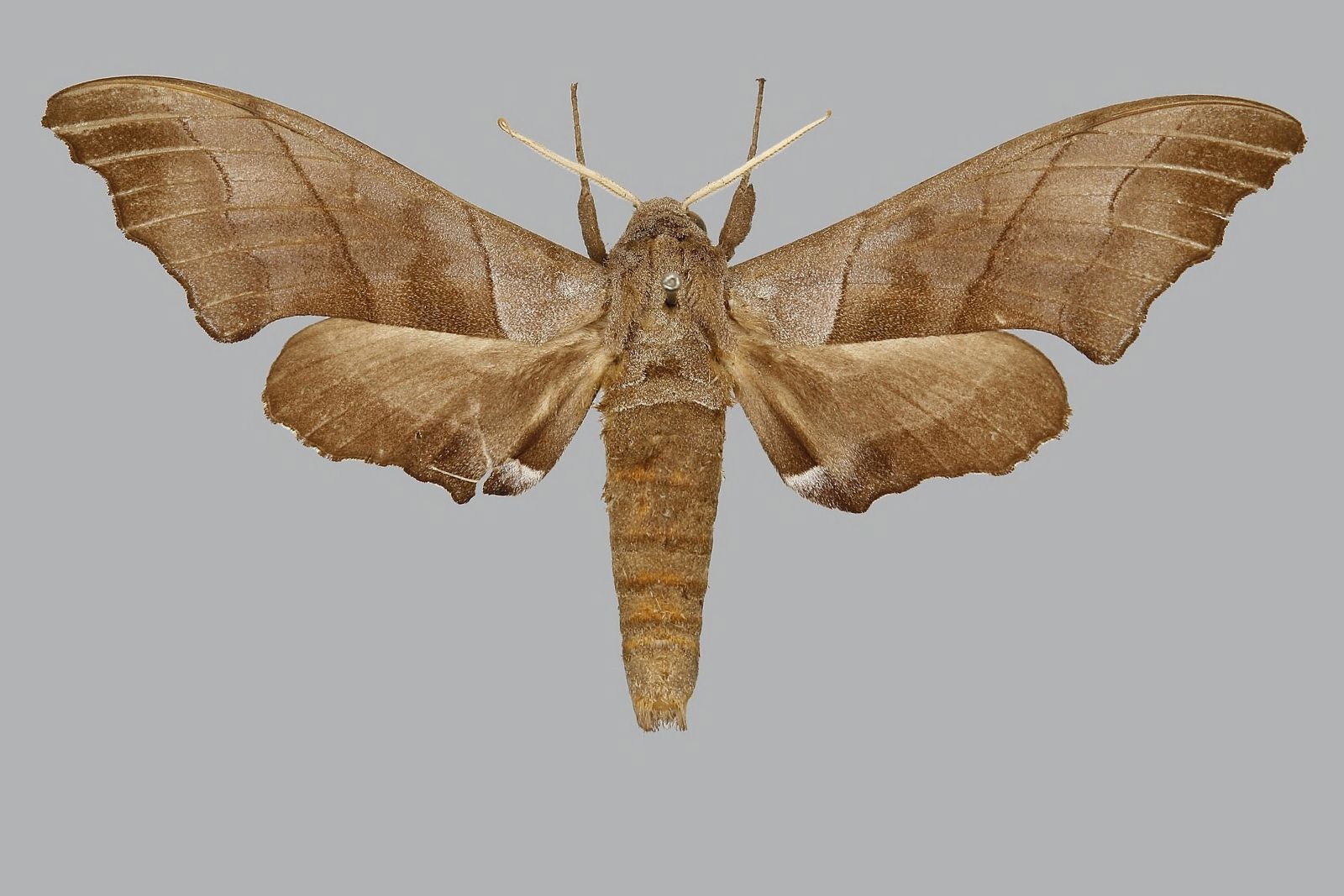
Polyptychus trilineatus male

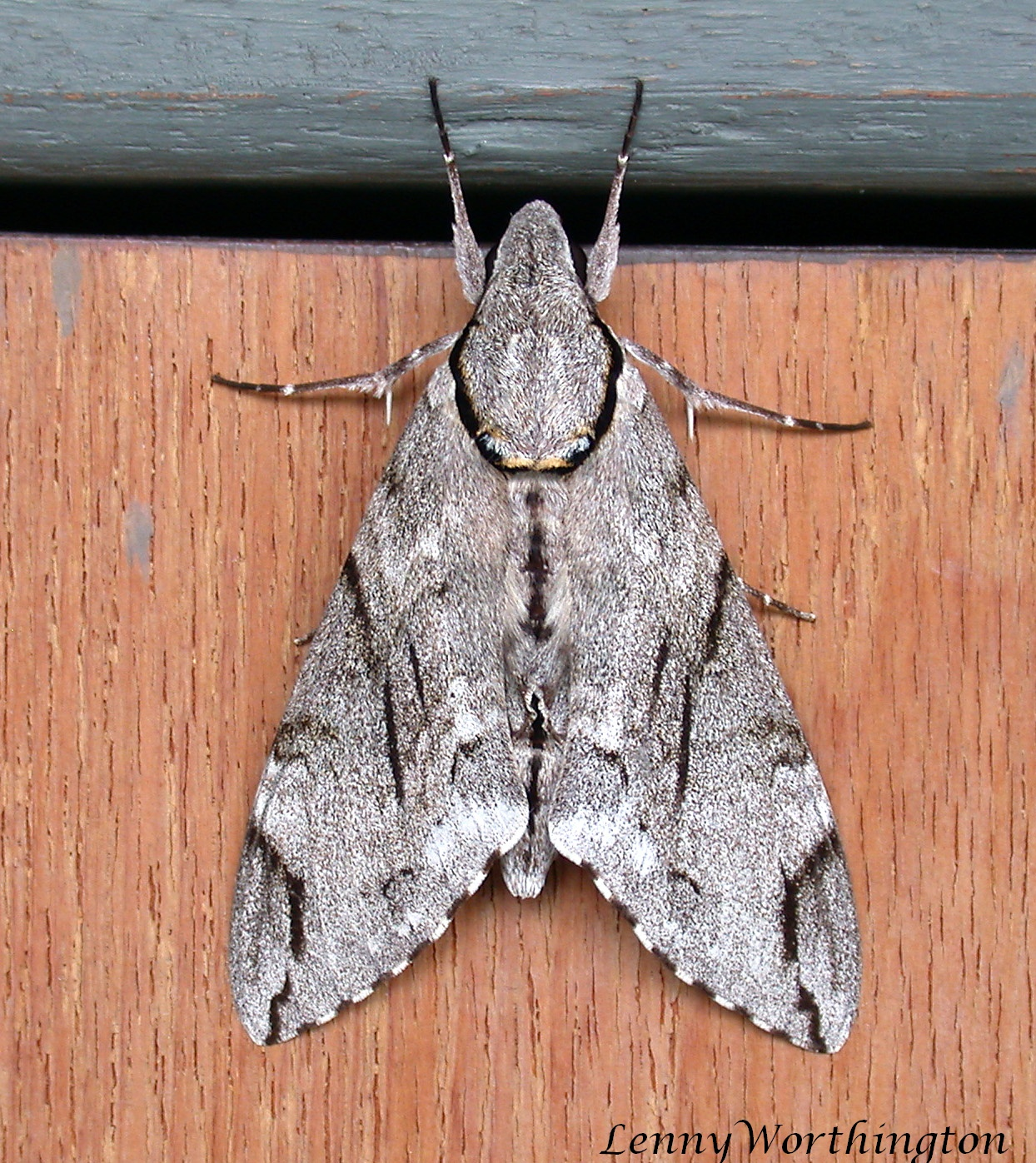
Psilogramma increta

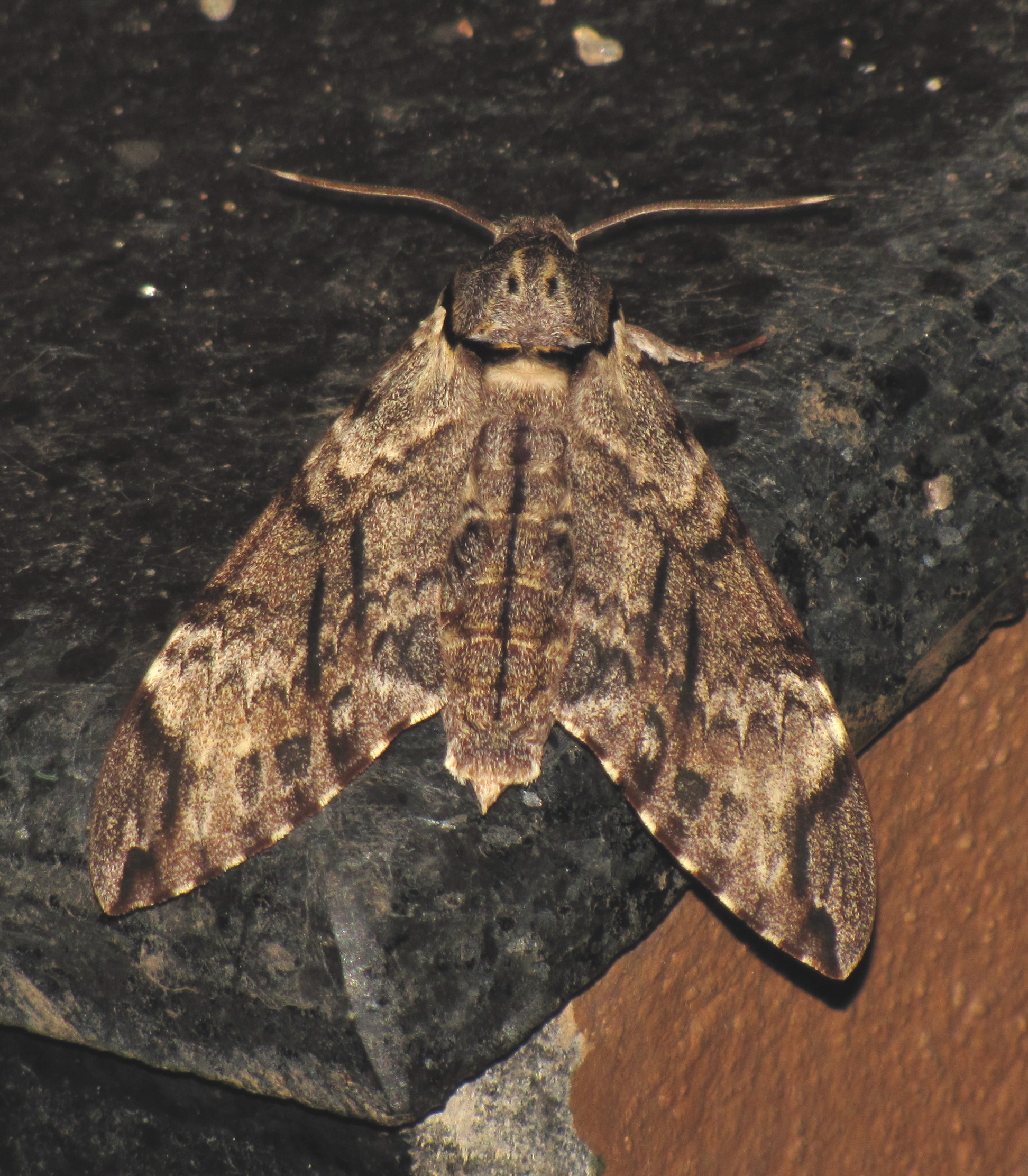
Psilogramma menephron

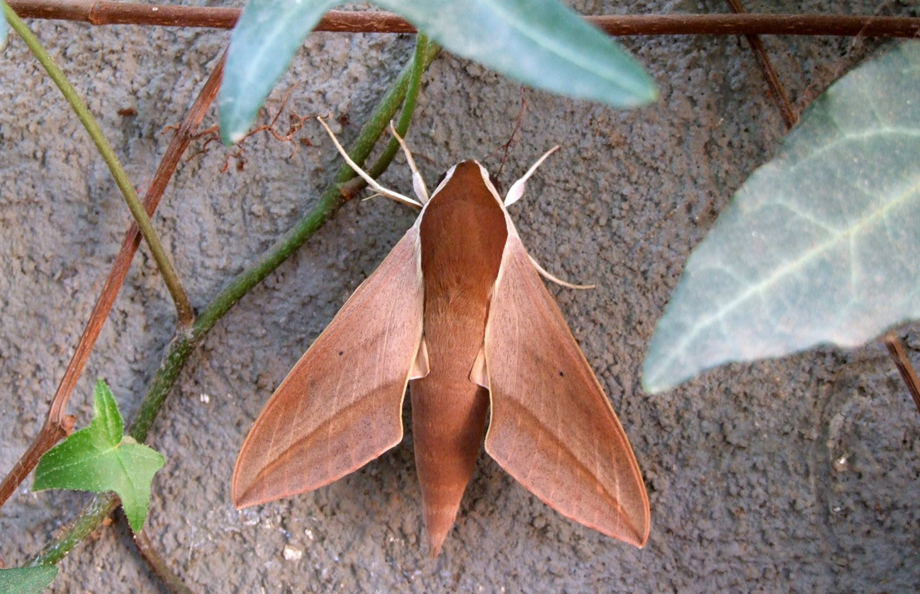
Theretra alecto

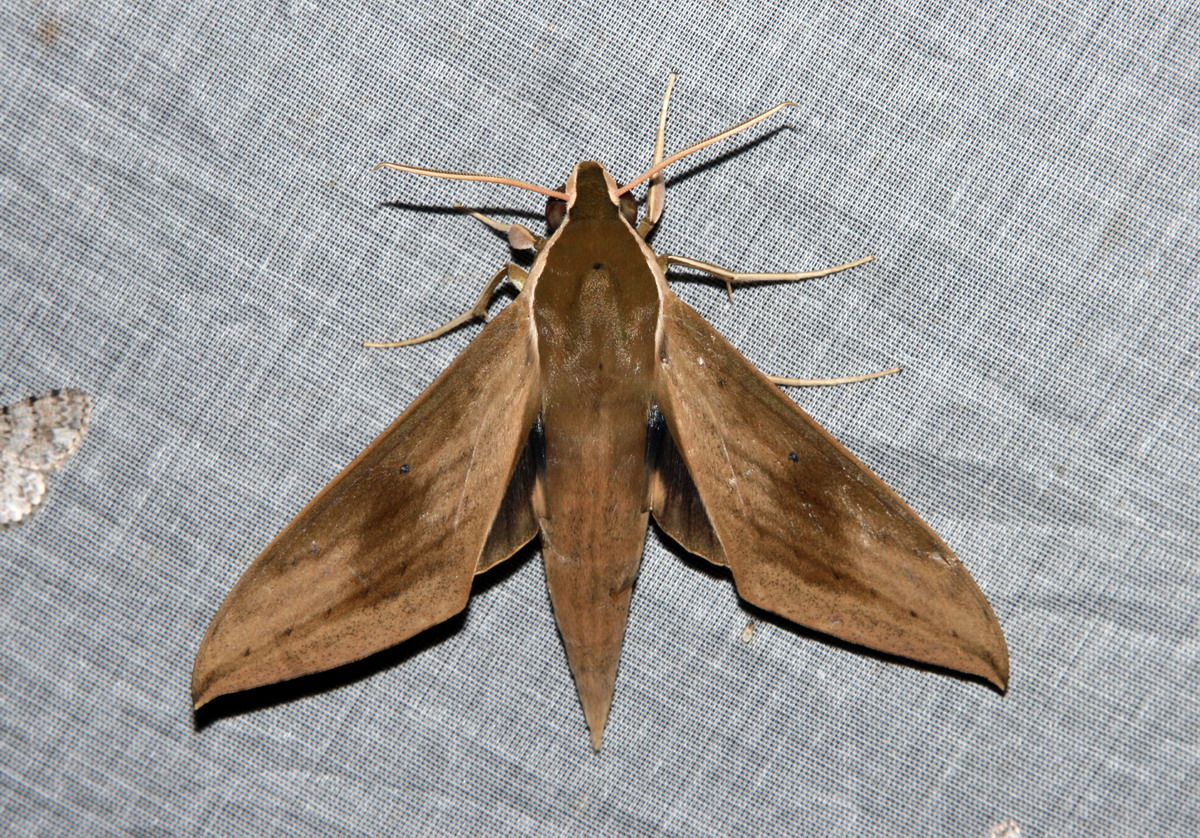
Theretra boisduvali

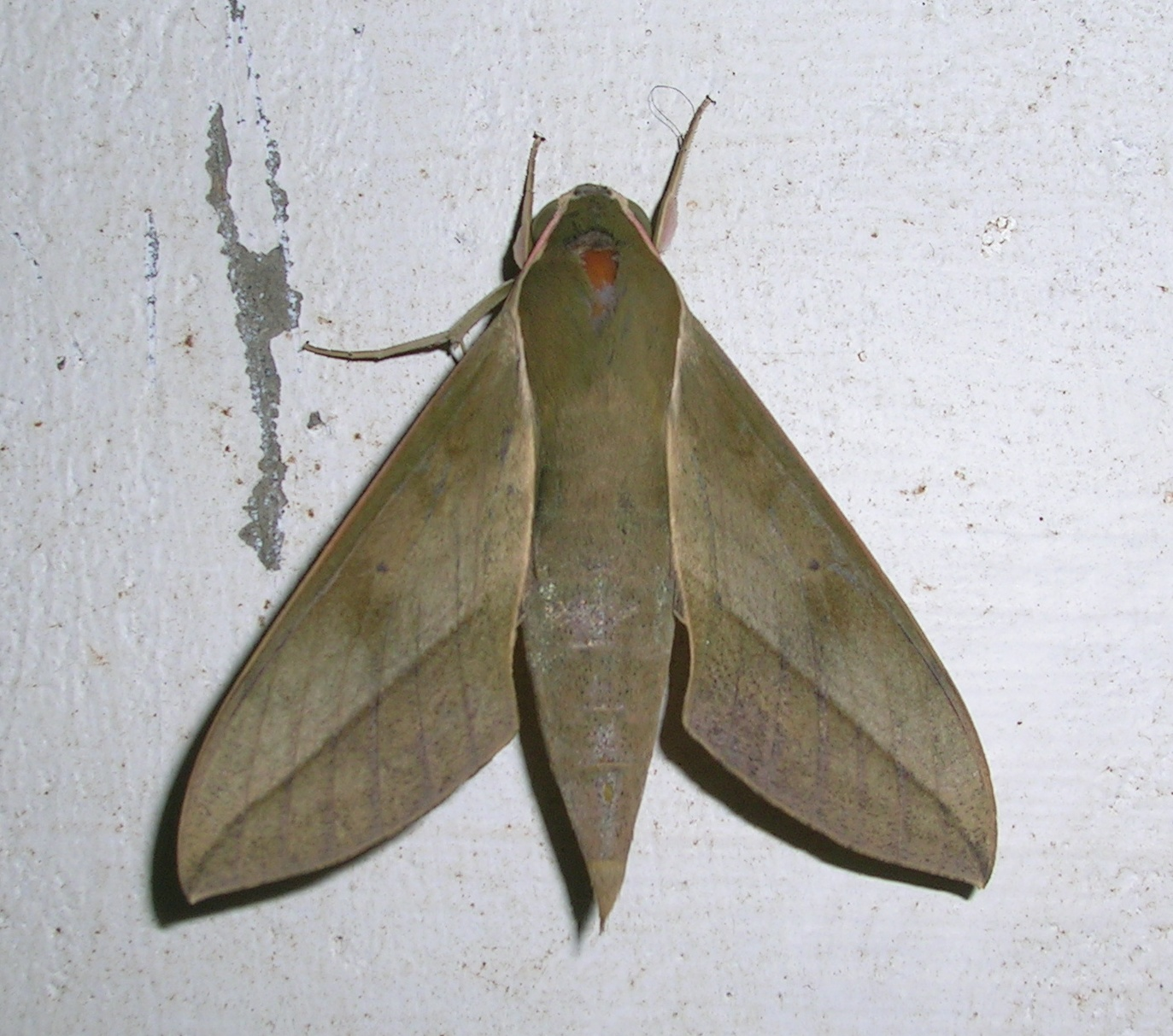
Theretra clotho

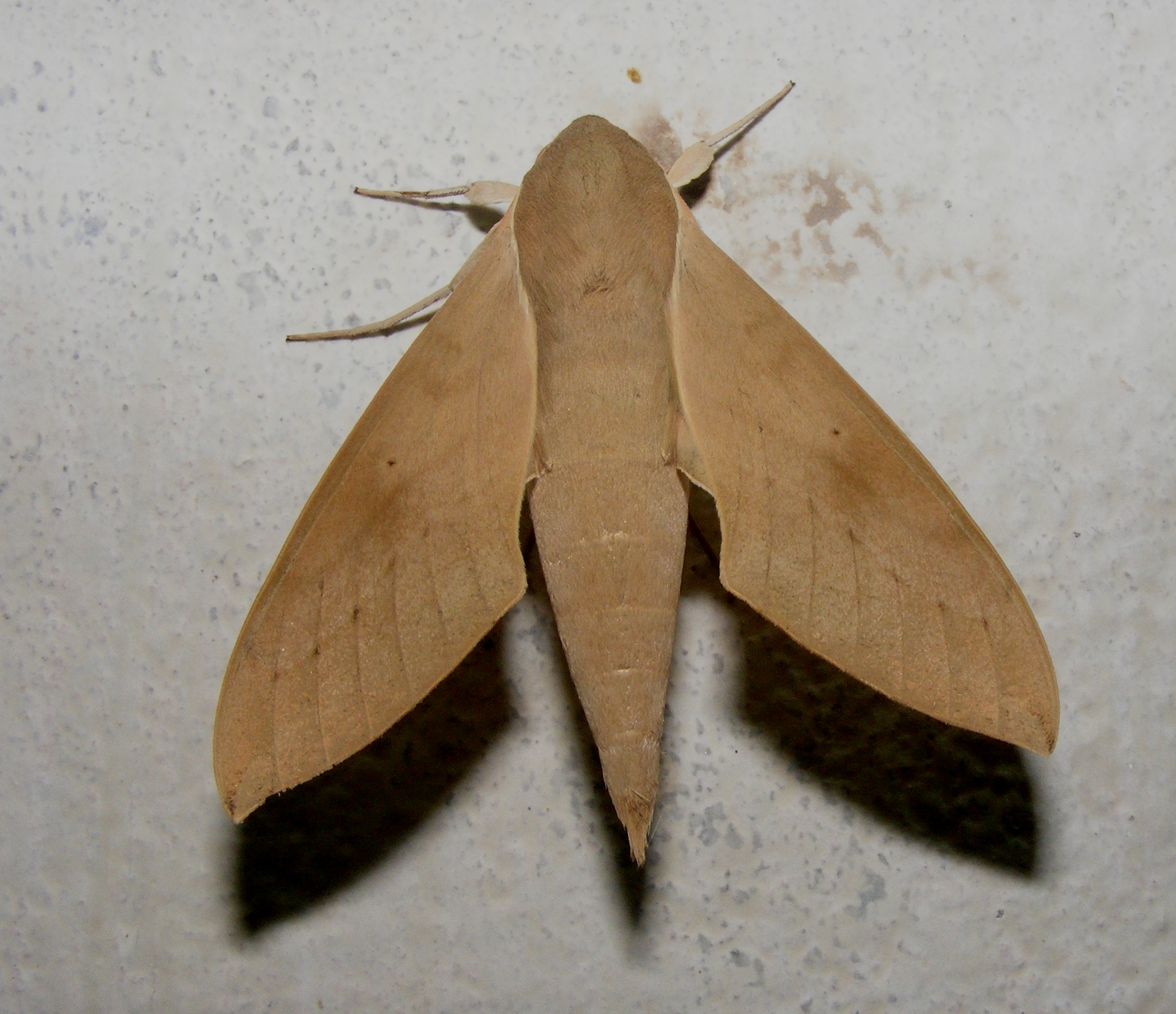
Theretra gnoma

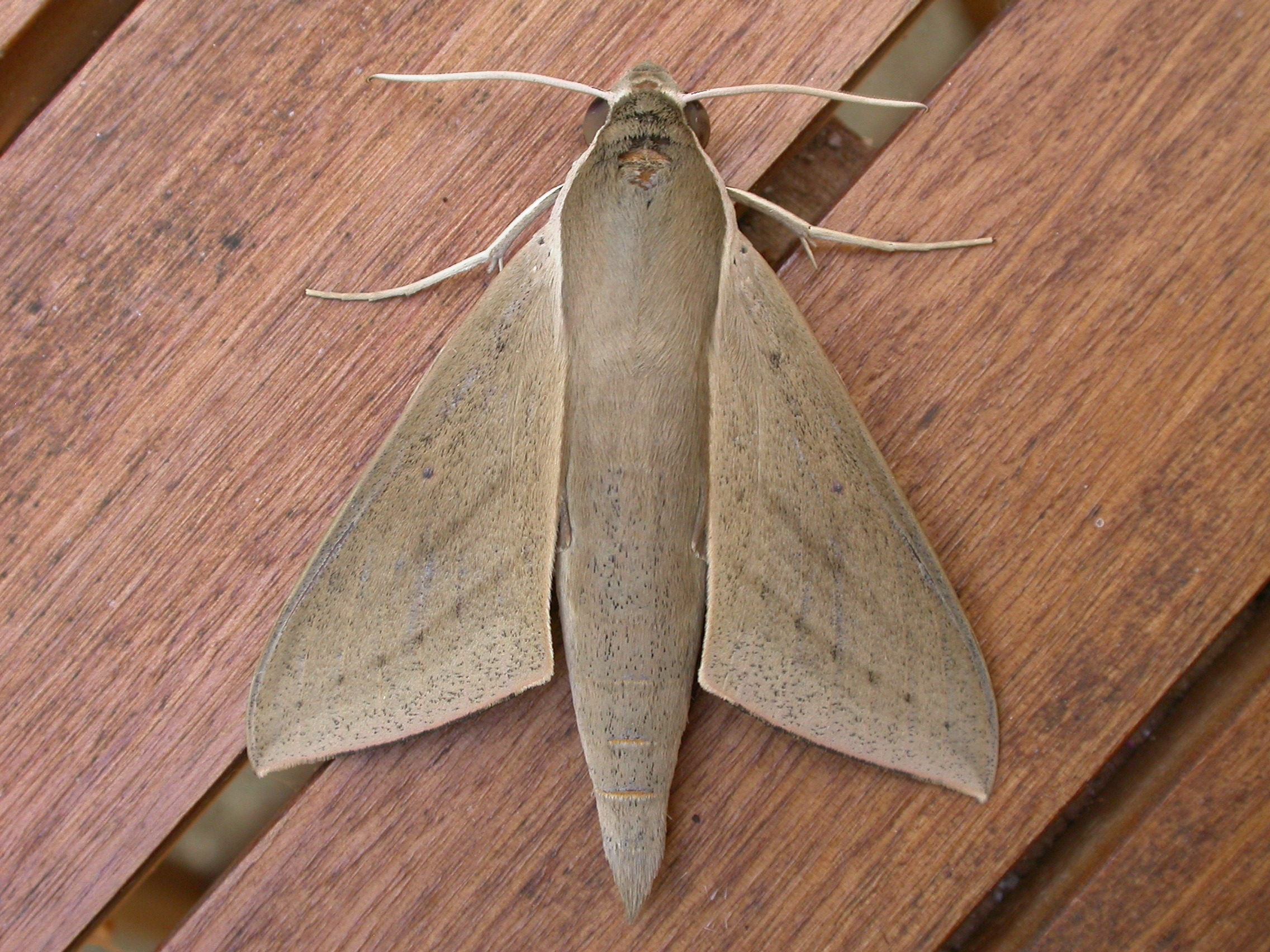
Theretra latreillii

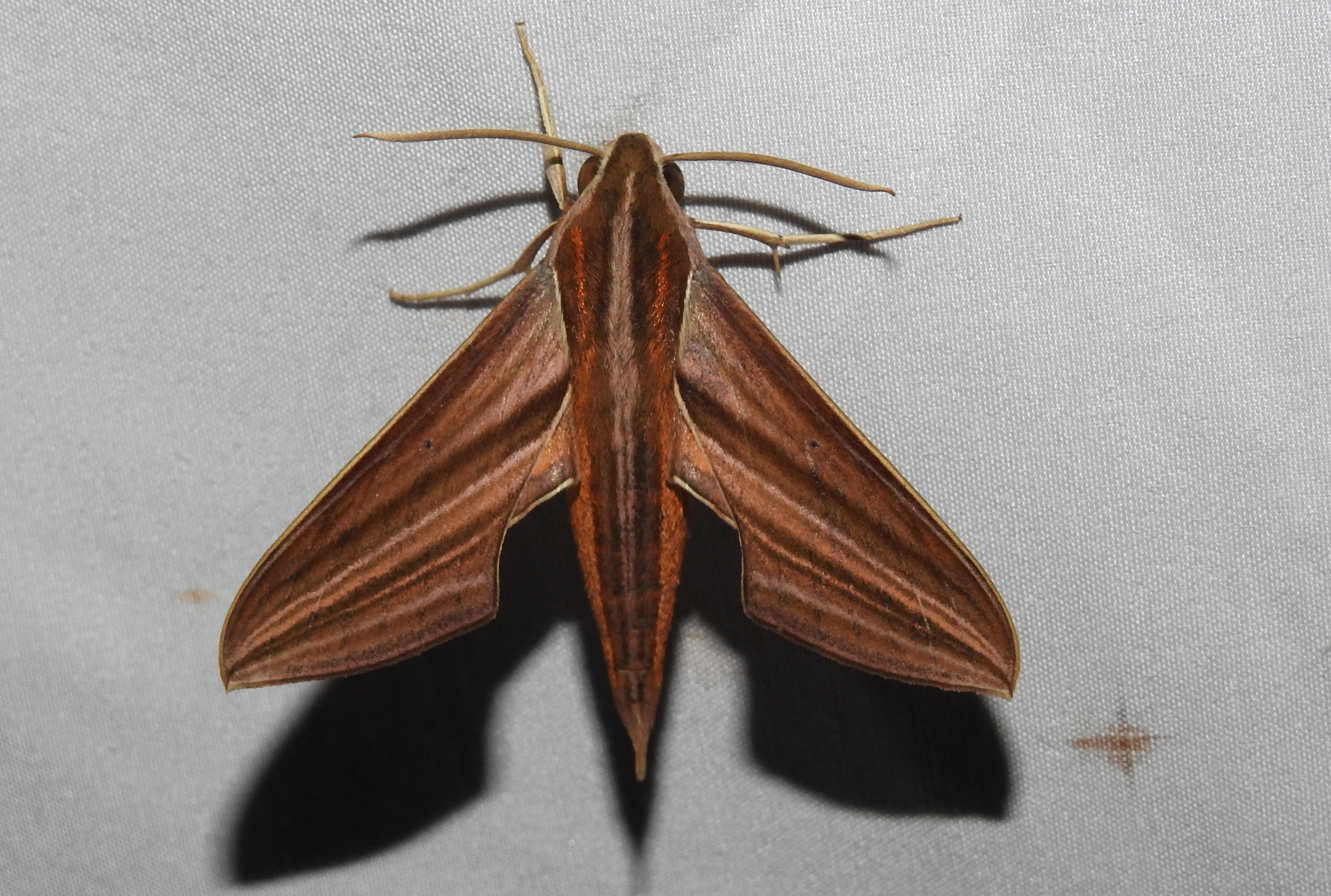
Theretra lycetus

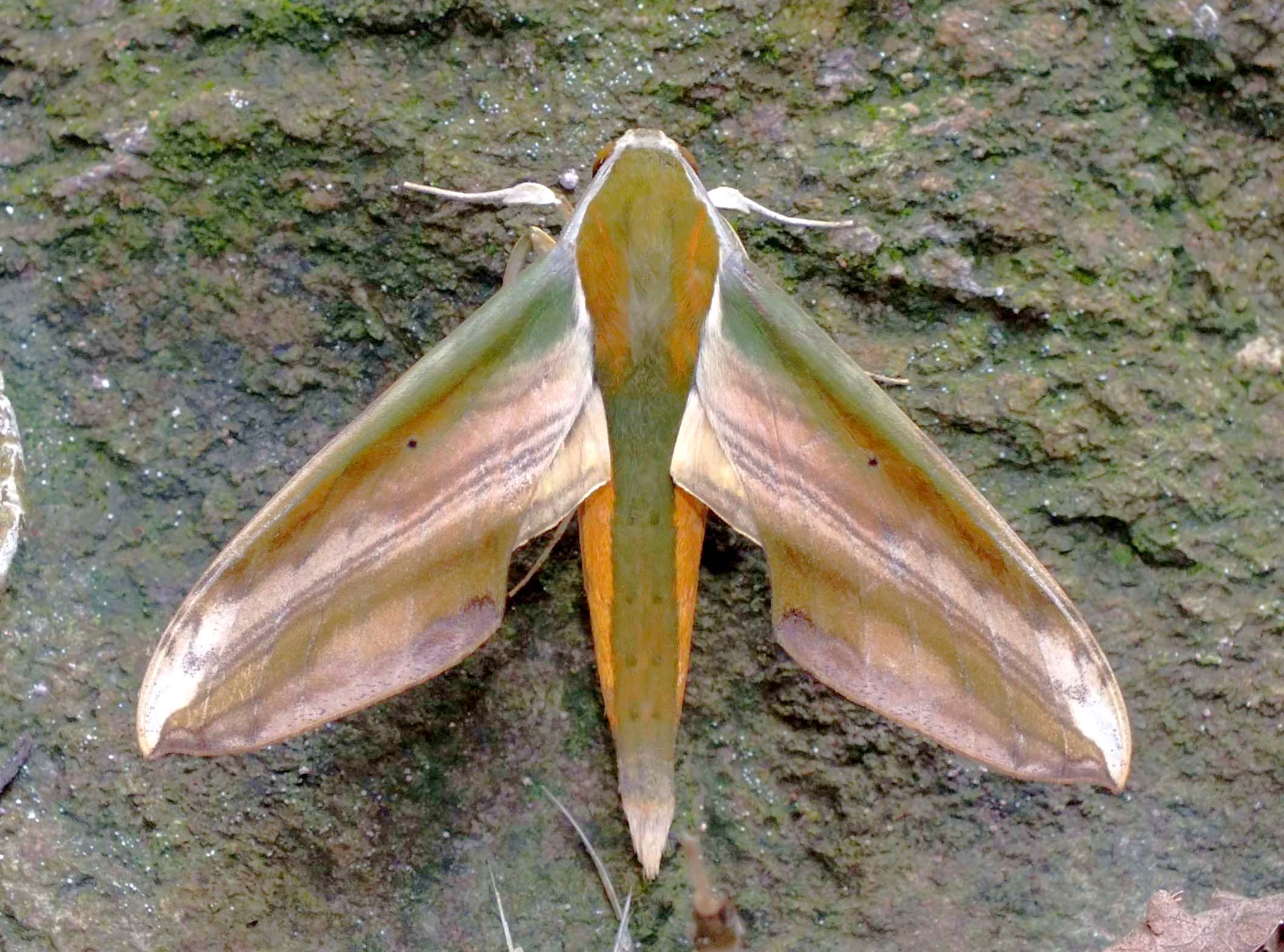
Theretra nessus

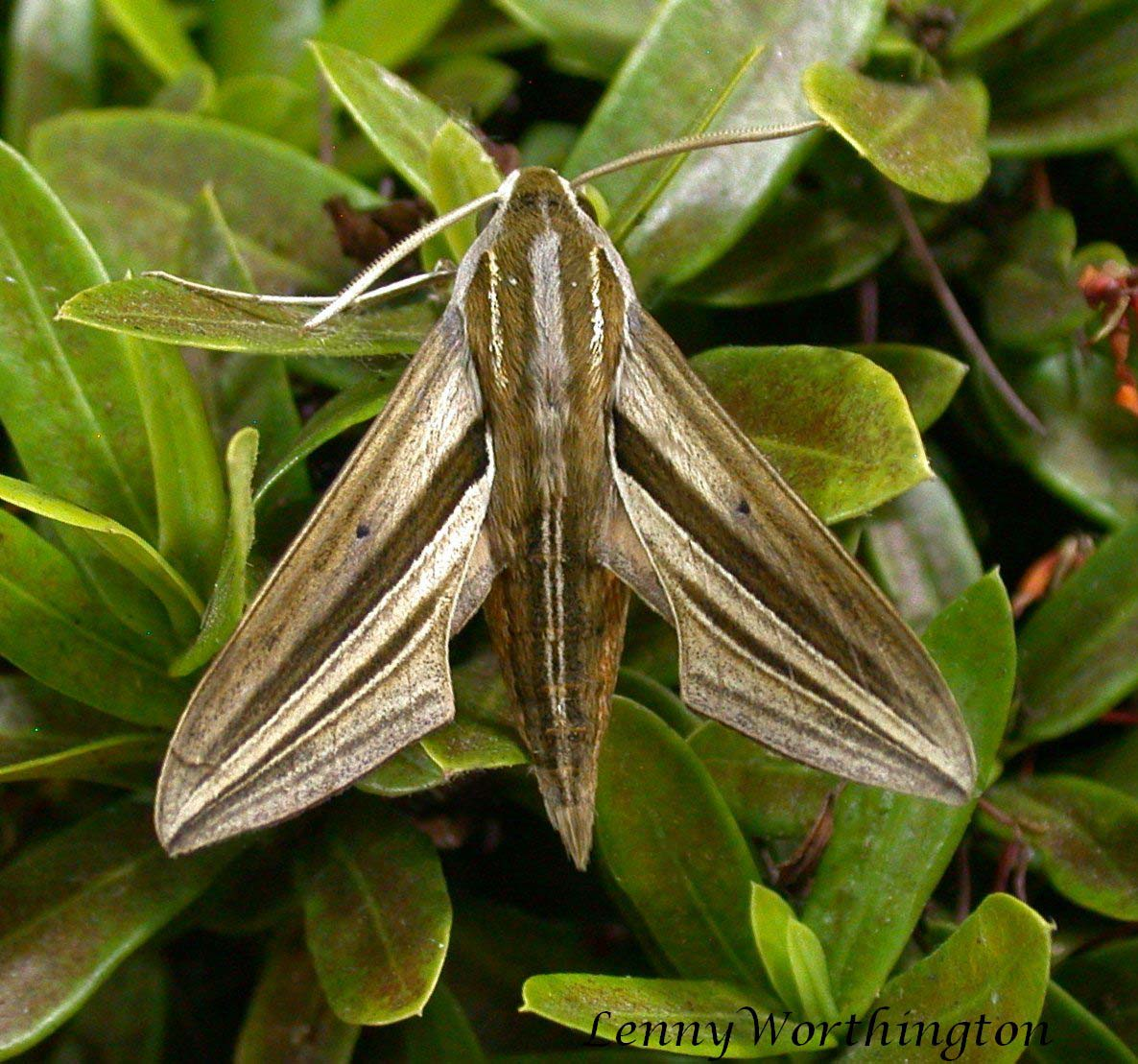
Theretra oldenlandiae

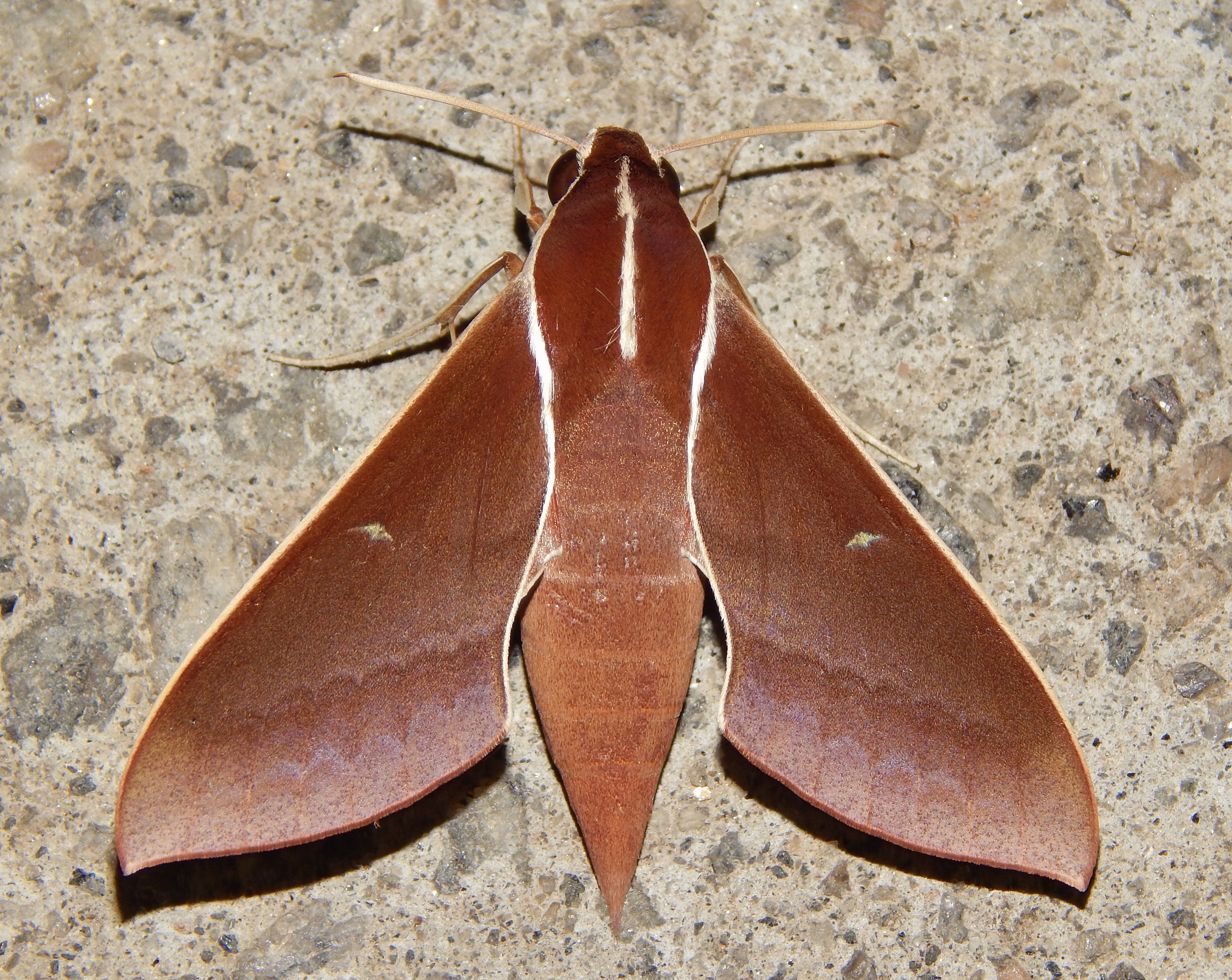
Theretra pallicosta

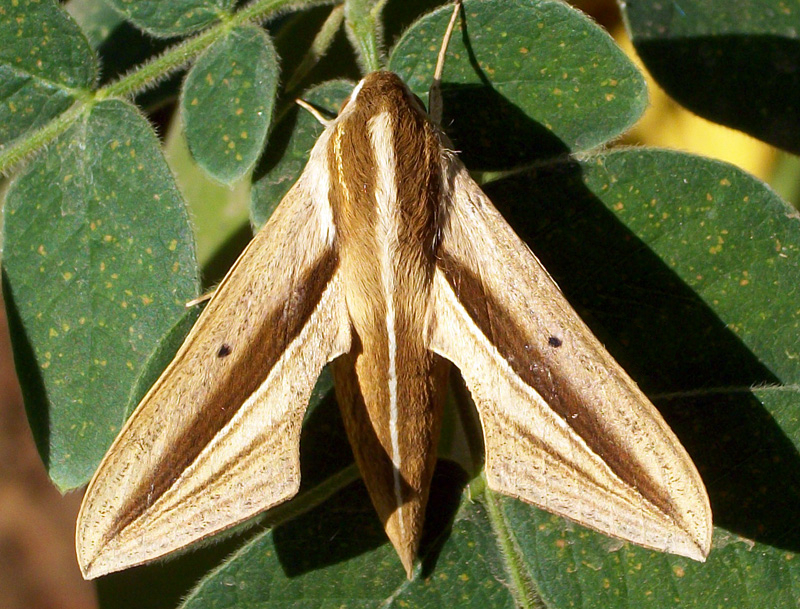
Theretra silhetensis

=== Thyrididae - picture-winged leaf moths ===
- Addaea trimeronalis (Walker, 1859)
- Aglaopus glareola Felder & Rogenhofer, 1875
- Banisia lobata (Moore, 1882)
- Banisia myrsusalis (Walker, 1859)
- Calindoea argentalis (Walker, 1866)
- Dixoa albatalis (Swinhoe, 1889)
- Dysodia ignita (Walker, 1858)
- Dysodia viridatrix (Walker, 1858)
- Hypolamprus angulalis (Moore, 1888)
- Hypolamprus bastialis (Walker, 1859)
- Hypolamprus lepraota Hampson, 1910
- Hypolamprus striatalis (Swinhoe, 1885)
- Hypolamprus subrosealis (Leech, 1898)
- Mathoris loceusalis (Walker 1859)
- Novobelura dohertyi (Warren, 1897)
- Pharambara micacealis Walker, [1865]
- Pharambara splendida Butler, 1887
- Rhodoneura discopis Hampson, 1910
- Rhodoneura disparalis Hammpson, 1910
- Rhodoneura nitens (Butler, 1887)
- Striglina scitaria (Walker, 1862)

=== Tineidae - fungus moths ===
- Amphixystis artiphanes (Meyrick, 1915)
- Amphixystis cincinnata (Meyrick, 1915)
- Amphixystis commatias (Meyrick, 1915)
- Amphixystis copidora (Meyrick, 1915)
- Amphixystis heteroclina (Meyrick, 1915)
- Amphixystis ligyropa (Meyrick, 1915)
- Amphixystis tachygrapha (Meyrick, 1915)
- Cimitra seclusella Walker, 1864
- Edosa opsigona (Meyrick, 1911)
- Erechthias dissimulans (Meyrick, 1915)
- Erechthias flavistriata (Walsingham, 1907)
- Erechthias minuscula (Walsingham, 1897)
- Erechthias pachygramma (Meyrick, 1921)
- Erechthias simulans (Butler, 1882)
- Erechthias transfumata (Meyrick, 1915)
- Erechthias zebrina (Butler, 1881)
- Harmaclona tephrantha (Meyrick, 1916)
- Ippa inceptrix (Meyrick, 1916)
- Ippa polyscia (Meyrick, 1917)
- Ippa recitatella (Walker, 1864)
- Ippa taxiarcha (Meyrick, 1916)
- Monopis monachella (Hübner, 1796)
- Opogona amphicausta Meyrick, 1907
- Opogona doxophanes Meyrick, 1915
- Opogona flavofasciata (Stainton, 1859)
- Opogona fumiceps Felder, 1875
- Opogona isotalanta Meyrick, 1930
- Opogona lamprophanes Meyrick, 1915
- Opogona orchestris Meyrick, 1911
- Opogona percnodes Meyrick, 1910
- Opogona sacchari (Boyer, 1859)
- Opogona stathmota Meyrick, 1911
- Opogona tergemina Meyrick, 1915
- Opogona trigonomis Meyrick, 1907
- Peristactis taraxias Meyrick, 1916
- Phaeoses chalinota (Meyrick, 1910)
- Phereoeca allutella Rebel, 1892 or Phereoeca uterella - not confirmed the species.
- Scalmatica constrata Meyrick, 1919
- Tineovertex melliflua (Meyrick, 1911)
- Tinissa torvella Walker, 1864
- Trichophaga mormopis Meyrick, 1935
- Trichophaga tapetzella (Linnaeus, 1758)
- Wegneria lachanitis (Meyrick, 1906)

=== Tortricidae - leaf-roller moths ===
- Acanthoclita balanoptycha (Meyrick, 1910)
- Acanthoclita acrocroca Diakonoff, 1982
- Acanthoclita iridorphna Meyrick, 1936
- Acanthoclita balia Diakonoff, 1982
- Acleris extensana (Walker, 1863)
- Acleris loxoscia (Meyrick, 1907)
- Acleris sagmatias (Meyrick, 1905)
- Acroclita cheradota Meyrick, 1912
- Acroclita sicaria Diakonoff, 1982
- Acroclita vigescens (Meyrick)
- Adoxophyes fasciculana (Walker, 1866)
- Adoxophyes privatana (Walker, 1863)
- Aemulatrix aequilibra Diakonoff, 1982
- Age onychistica Diakonoff, 1982
- Anathamna megalozona Meyrick, 1916
- Ancylis ancorata (Meyrick, 1912)
- Ancylis rostrifera (Meyrick, 1912)
- Ancylis stenampyx Diakonoff, 1982
- Ancylis tumida Meyrick, 1912
- Antaeola antaea (Meyrick, 1912)
- Arcesis threnodes (Meyrick, 1905)
- Archimaga pyractis Meyrick, 1905
- Archips eupatris (Meyrick, 1908)
- Archips gyraleus Diakonoff, 1982
- Archips micaceana (Walker, 1863)
- Archips mimicus (Walsingham, 1900)
- Articolla cyclidias Meyrick, 1907
- Bactra angulata Diakonoff, 1956
- Bactra cerata Meyrick, 1909
- Bactra chariessa Diakonoff, 1964
- Bactra copidotes (Meyrick, 1909)
- Bactra coronata Diakonoff, 1950
- Bactra honesta (Meyrick, 1909)
- Bactra leucogama (Meyrick, 1909)
- Bactra minima (Meyrick, 1909)
- Bactra optanias (Meyrick, 1911)
- Bactra tornastis (Meyrick, 1909)
- Bactra venosana (Zeller, 1847)
- Brachiolia egenella (Walker, 1864)
- Cnesteboda celligera Meyrick, 1918
- Cnesteboda haruspex (Meyrick, 1912)
- Costosa rhodantha (Meyrick, 1907)
- Crocidosema lantana (Busck, 1910)
- Crocidosema plebejana Zeller, 1847
- Crusimetra verecunda Meyrick, 1912
- Cryptaspasma brachyptycha Meyrick, 1911
- Cryptaspasma helota (Meyrick, 1905)
- Cryptophlebia ombrodelta (Lower, 1898)
- Cryptophlebia rhynchias (Meyrick, 1905)
- Cyclacanthina monosema Diakonoff, 1973
- Cydia aelina Diakonoff, 1982
- Cydia chelias (Meyrick, 1907)
- Cydia leucostoma (Meyrick, 1912)
- Cydia obliqua (Diakonoff, 1982)
- Dactylioglypha tonica (Meyrick, 1909)
- Dasodis microphthora (Meyrick, 1936)
- Dicephalarcha anemodes (Meyrick, 1912)
- Dicnecidia cataclasta Diakonoff, 1982
- Didrimys harmonica (Meyrick, 1905)
- Diplocalyptis operosa (Meyrick, 1908)
- Diplosemaphora amphibola Diakonoff, 1982
- Dudua aprobola (Meyrick, 1886)
- Dudua charadraea (Meyrick, 1909)
- Eboda smaragdinana Walker, 1866
- Eccopsis inflicta Meyrick, 1920
- Endothenia citharistis (Meyrick, 1909)
- Endothenia rhachistis (Diakonoff, 1973)
- Epinotia canthonias (Meyrick, 1920)
- Eucoenogenes ancyrota (Meyrick, 1907)
- Eucosma capitulata (Meyrick, 1907)
- Eucosma cremnitis Meyrick, 1912
- Eucosma ocladias (Meyrick, 1906)
- Eucosma rhymogramma (Meyrick, 1916)
- Eucosmophyes icelitodes Diakonoff, 1982
- Eupoecilia anisoneura Diakonoff, 1982
- Eupoecilia charixantha (Meyrick, 1928)
- Eupoecilia cracens Diakonoff, 1982
- Eupoecilia eucalypta (Meyrick, 1928)
- Fibuloides corinthia Meyrick, 1912
- Fibuloides cyanopsis (Meyrick, 1912)
- Fibuloides neaera (Meyrick, 1912)
- Fulcrifera tricentra (Meyrick, 1907)
- Gatesclarkeana erotias (Meyrick, 1905)
- Gnathmocerodes tonsoria (Meyrick, 1909)
- Grapholita dysaethria Diakonoff, 1982
- Grapholita schizodelta Diakonoff, 1982
- Grapholita isacma (Meyrick)
- Grapholita obliqua Diakonoff, 1982
- Gynnidomorpha permixtana (Denis & Schiffermüller)
- Gypsonoma aechnemorpha Diakonoff, 1982
- Gypsonoma anthracitis Meyrick, 1912
- Hedya iophaea (Meyrick, 1912)
- Heleanna physalodes (Meyrick, 1910)
- Helictophanes dryocoma (Meyrick, 1916)
- Hermenias implexa (Meyrick, 1912)
- Hermenias pachnitis (Meyrick, 1912)
- Hermenias palmicola (Meyrick, 1912)
- Herpystis jejuna (Meyrick, 1916)
- Hilarographa caminodes Meyrick, 1905
- Hilarographa hermatodes Meyrick, 1909
- Homona coffearia (Nietner, 1861)
- Homona encausta (Meyrick, 1907)
- Irianassa sapphiropa Meyrick, 1905
- Isodemis serpentinana (Walker, 1863)
- Kennelia albifascies (Walsingham, 1900)
- Lasiognatha mormopa (Meyrick, 1906)
- Licigena sertula Diakonoff, 1982
- Lobesia aeolopa (Meyrick, 1907)
- Lobesia fetialis (Meyrick, 1920)
- Lobesia genialis (Meyrick, 1912)
- Lobesia lithogonia Diakonoff, 1954
- Loboschiza koenigiana (Fabricius, 1775)
- Lopharcha chalcophanes (Meyrick, 1931)
- Lopharcha erioptila (Meyrick, 1912)
- Lopharcha halidora (Meyrick, 1908)
- Lopharcha rapax (Meyrick, 1908)
- Lumaria probolias (Meyrick, 1907)
- Lumaria pusillana (Walker, 1863)
- Macrobathra nomaea Meyrick, 1914
- Matsumuraeses trophiodes (Meyrick)
- Megaherpystis melanoneura (Meyrick, 1912)
- Megalota fallax (Meyrick, 1909)
- Meridemis detractana (Walker, 1863)
- Meridemis invalidana (Walker, 1863)
- Metendothenia fidelis Diakonoff, 1973
- Metendothenia organica (Meyrick, 1920)
- Metrernis ochrolina Meyrick, 1906
- Metrioglypha confertana (Walker, 1863)
- Microsarotis palamedes (Meyrick, 1916)
- Microsarotis lucida (Meyrick, 1916)
- Nenomoshia poetica (Meyrick)
- Neocalyptis affinisana (Walker, 1863)
- Ophiorrhabda cellifera (Meyrick, 1912)
- Pammene critica (Meyrick, 1905)
- Pammenemima ochropa (Meyrick)
- Periphoeba palmodes Meyrick, 1920
- Phricanthes flexilineana (Walker, 1863)
- Planostocha cumulata (Meyrick)
- Polylopha epidesma Lower, 1901
- Prophaecasia anthion Diaknonoff, 1973
- Proschistis zaleuta Meyrick, 1907
- Psilacantha creserias (Meyrick, 1905)
- Pyrgotis siderantha (Meyrick, 1905)
- Rhectogonia ancalota (Meyrick, 1907)
- Rhopobota multiplex (Meyrick, 1913)
- Rhopobota scleropa (Meyrick, 1912)
- Rhopobota falcigera (Diakonoff, 1950)
- Rhopobota naevana (Hübner, [1814-1817])
- Scoliographa acanthis (Meyrick)
- Sorolopha bryana (Felder & Rogenhofer, 1875)
- Sorolopha archimedias (Meyrick)
- Sorolopha compsitis (Meyrick, 1912)
- Sorolopha phyllochlora (Meyrick, 1905)
- Sorolopha semiculta (Meyrick, 1909)
- Spanistoneura acrospodia Diakonoff, 1982
- Statherotis leucaspis (Meyrick, 1902)
- Statherotis decorata (Meyrick)
- Statherotis agitata (Meyrick)
- Strepsicrates rhothia (Meyrick)
- Sychnochlaena megalorhis Diakonoff, 1982
- Syntozyga ephippias (Meyrick, 1907)
- Temnolopha mosaica Lower, 1901
- Tetramoera isogramma (Meyrick, 1907)
- Thaumatotibia encarpa (Meyrick, 1920)
- Trophocosta cyanoxantha (Meyrick, 1907)
- Trymalitis cataracta Meyrick, 1907
- Trymalitis margarias Meyrick, 1905

=== Uraniidae - swallowtail moths ===
- Acropteris ciniferaria (Walker, 1866)
- Decetia subobscurata Walker, 1862
- Dysaethria conflictaria (Walker, 1861) - also as Epiplema conflictaria
- Dysaethria fulvihamata (Hampson, 19i2)
- Dysaethria obscuraria (Moore, 1887)
- Dysaethria quadricaudata (Walker, 1861)
- Dysaethria rhagavata (Walker, 1861)
- Dysaethria scopocera (Hampson, 1896)
- Epiplema albida Hampson
- Epiplema irrorata Moore, 1887
- Epiplema latifasciata Moore, 1887
- Epiplema quadristrigata (Walker, 1866)
- Epiplema tenebrosa Hampson
- Europlema conchiferata (Moore, 1887)
- Europlema desistaria (Walker, 1861)
- Gathynia ferrugata Walker, 1866
- Gathynia miraria Walker, [1863]
- Metorthocheilus emarginata Hampson, 1891
- Micronia aculeata Guenée,[1858]
- Monobolodes prunaria (Moore, 1887)
- Monobolodes parvinigrata Holloway, 1998
- Oroplema simplex (Warren, 1899)
- Phazaca erosioides Walker, 1863
- Phazaca leucocera (Hampson, 1891)
- Phazaca theclata (Guenée, 1857)
- Pseudomicronia advocataria Moore, 1887
- Pseudomicronia fraterna Moore
- Strophidia caudata (Fabricius, 1781)
- Urapteroides astheniata (Guenée,[1858])
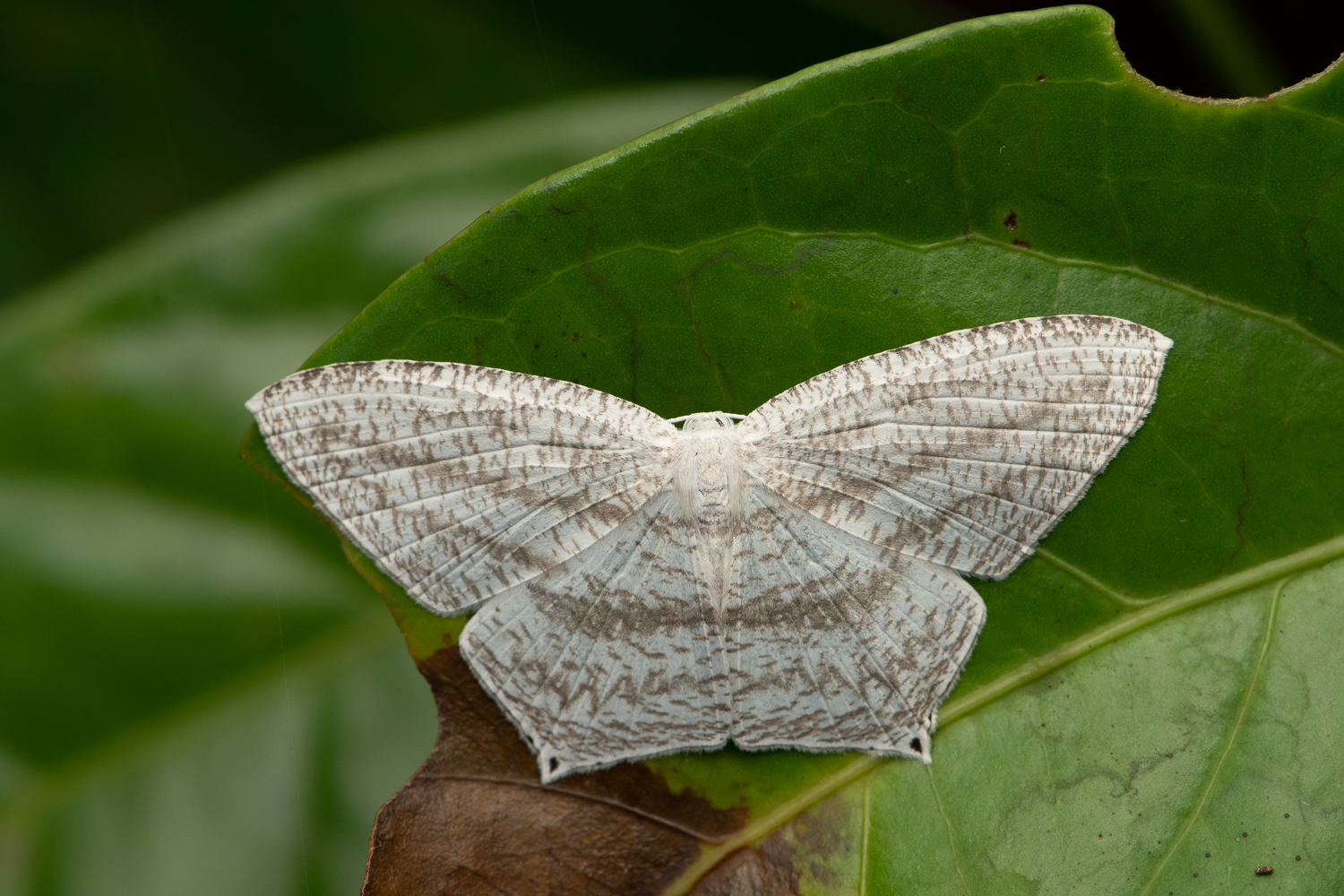
Acropteris ciniferaria

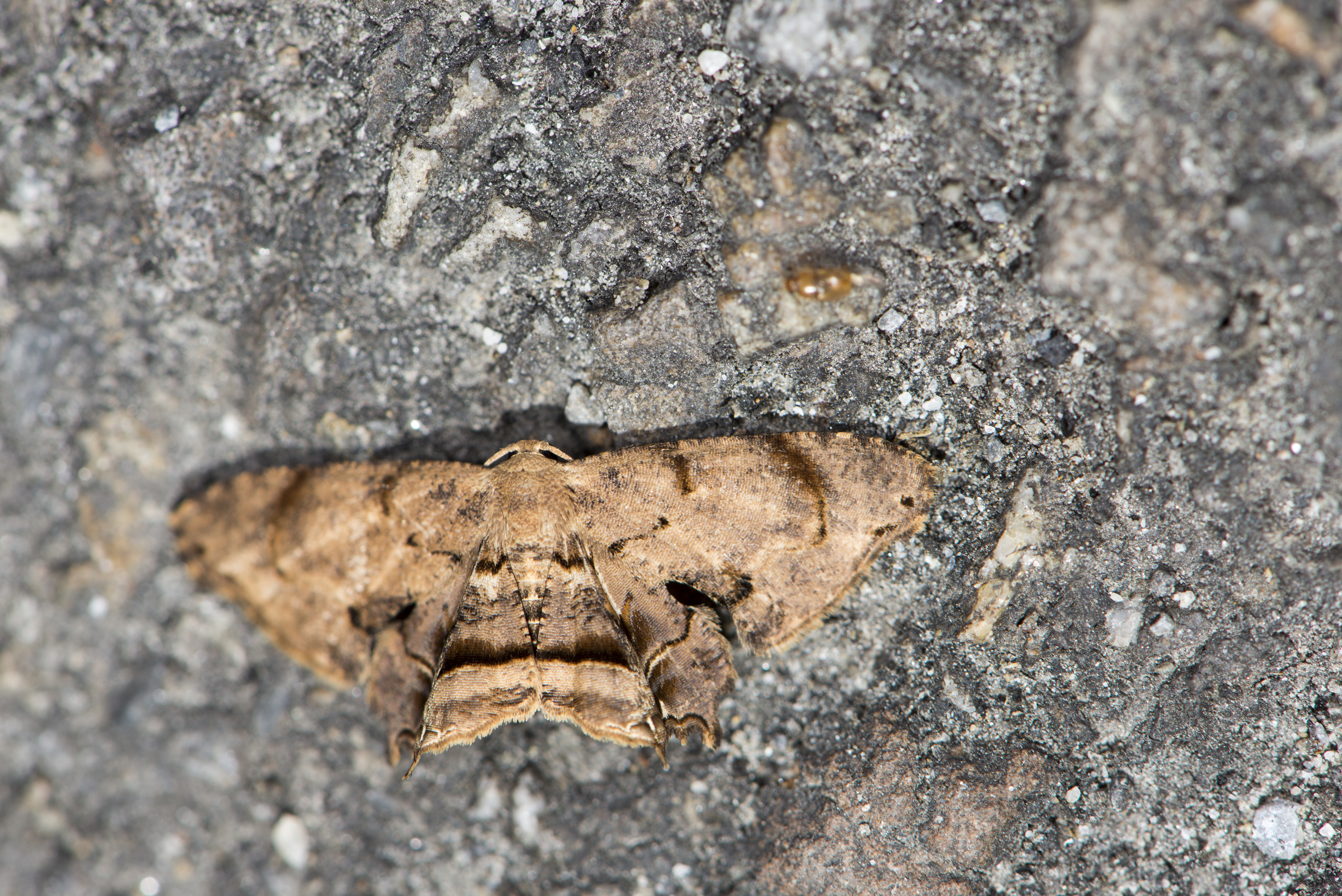
Dysaethria fulvihamata

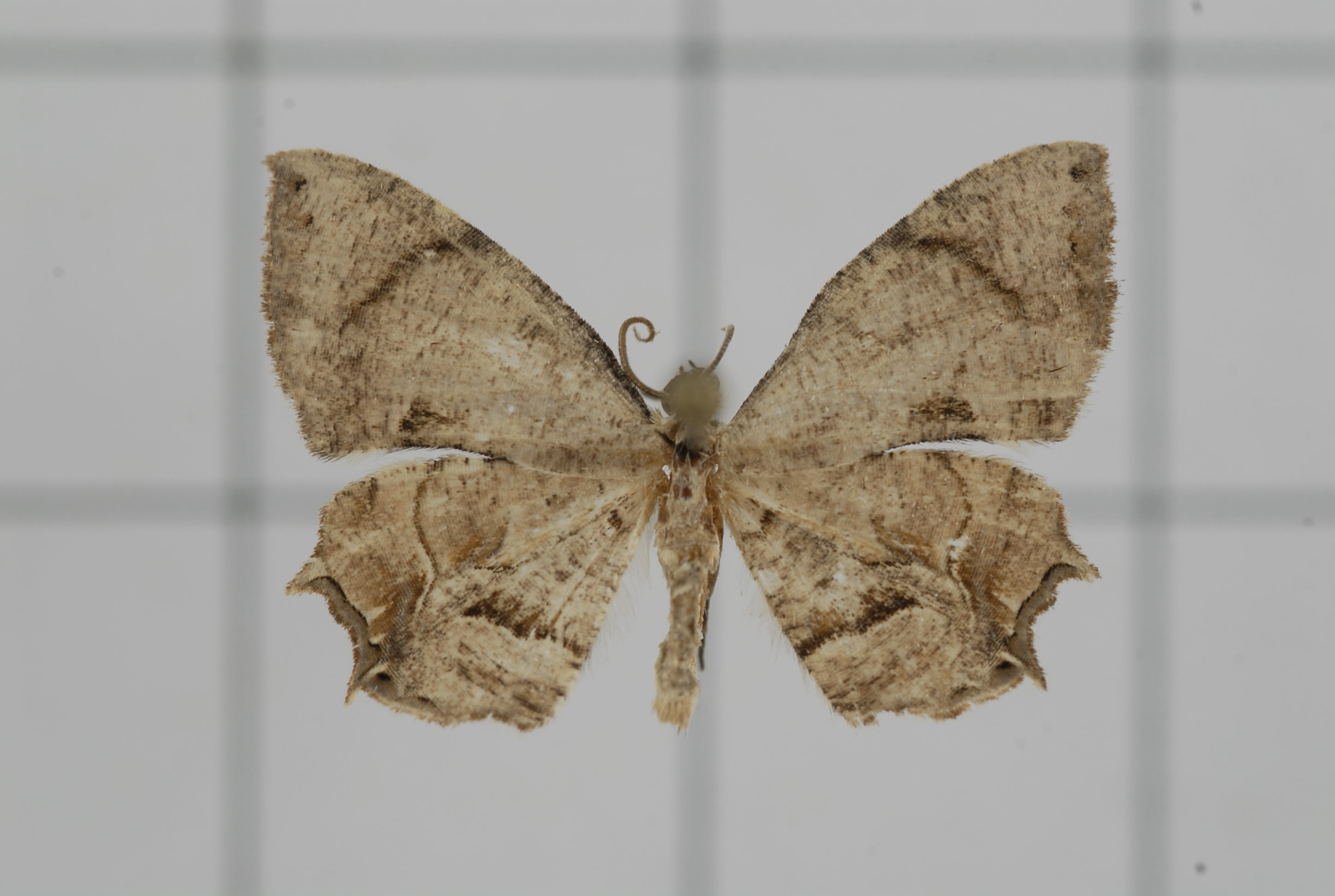
Dysaethria obscuraria

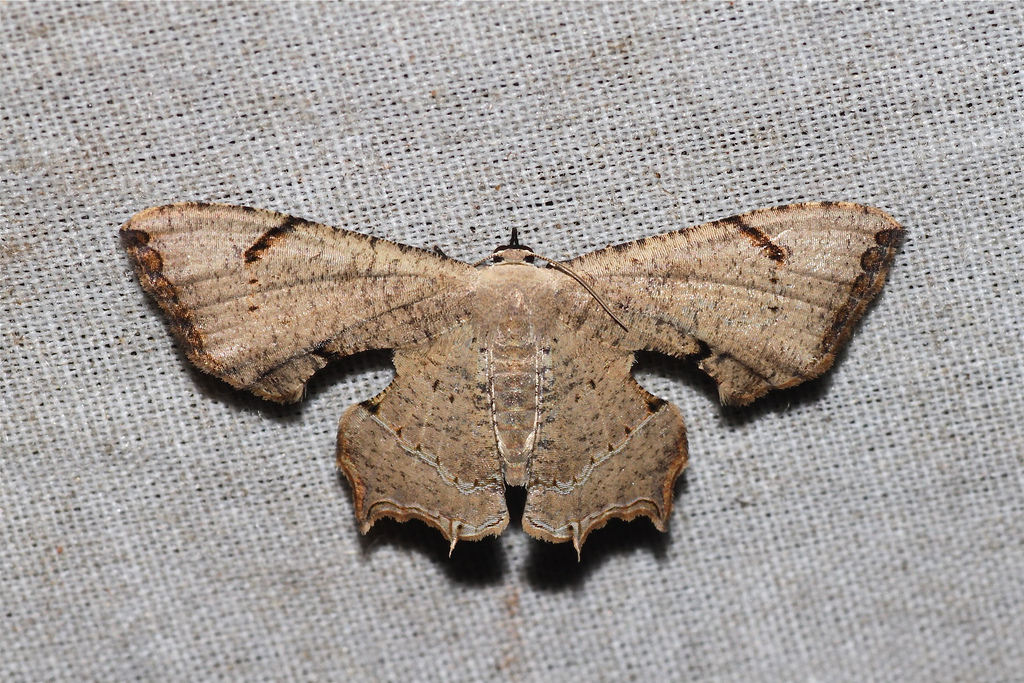
Dysaethria quadricaudata

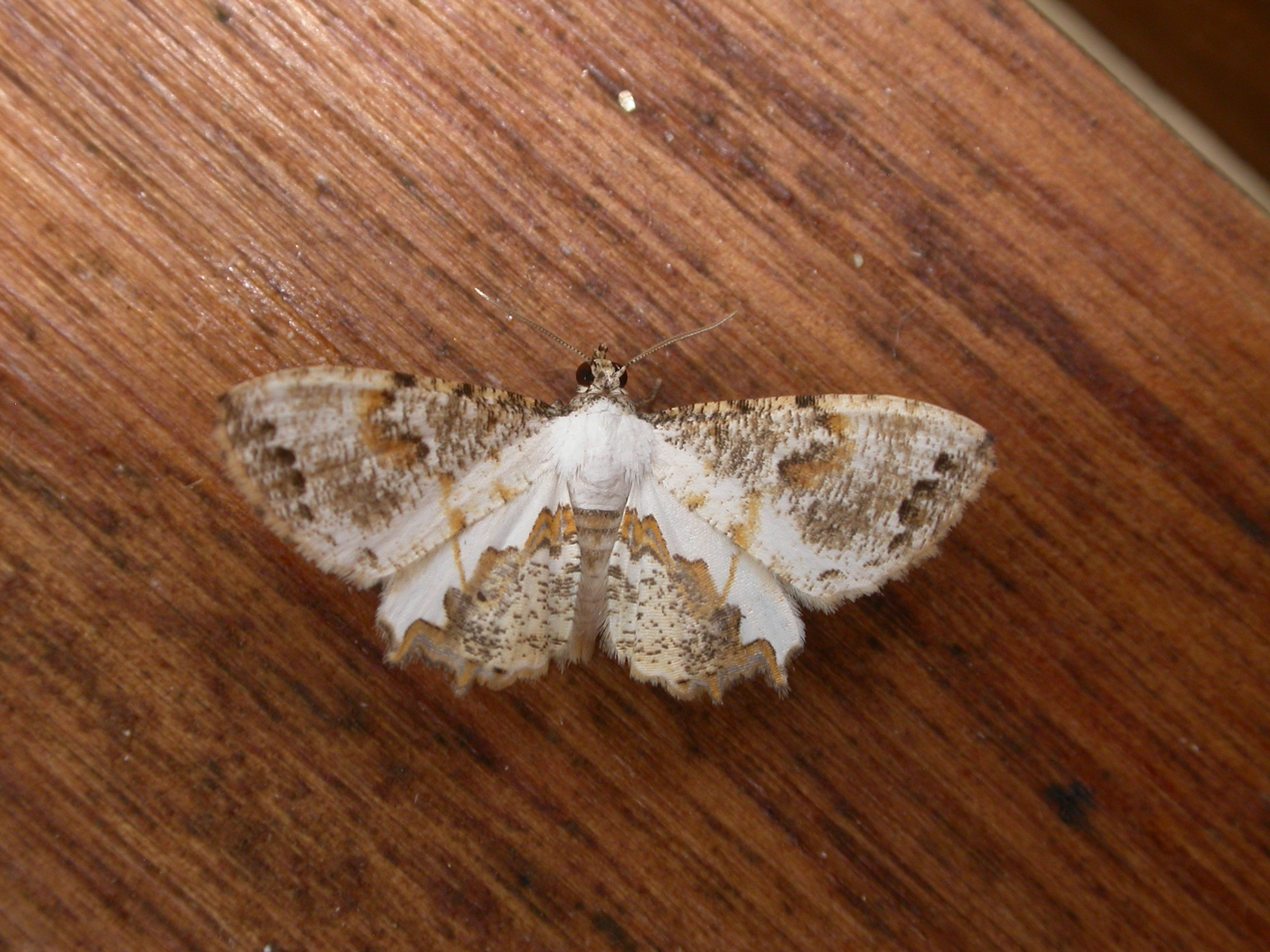
Epiplema desistaria

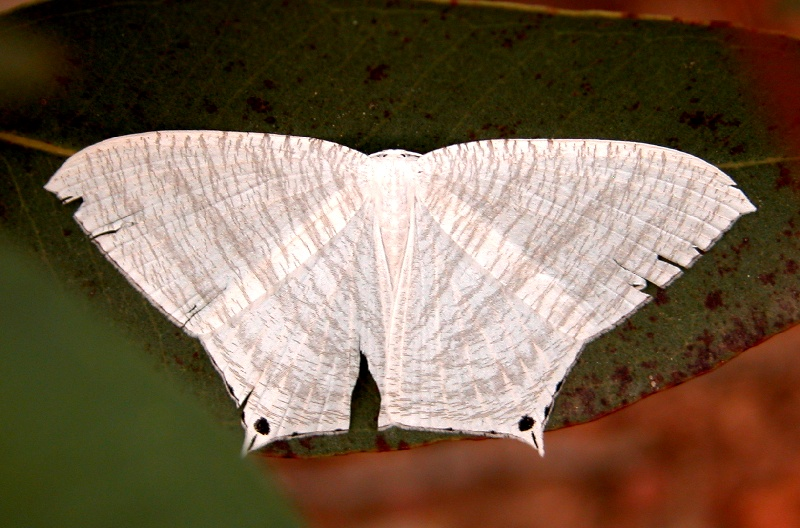
Micronia aculeata

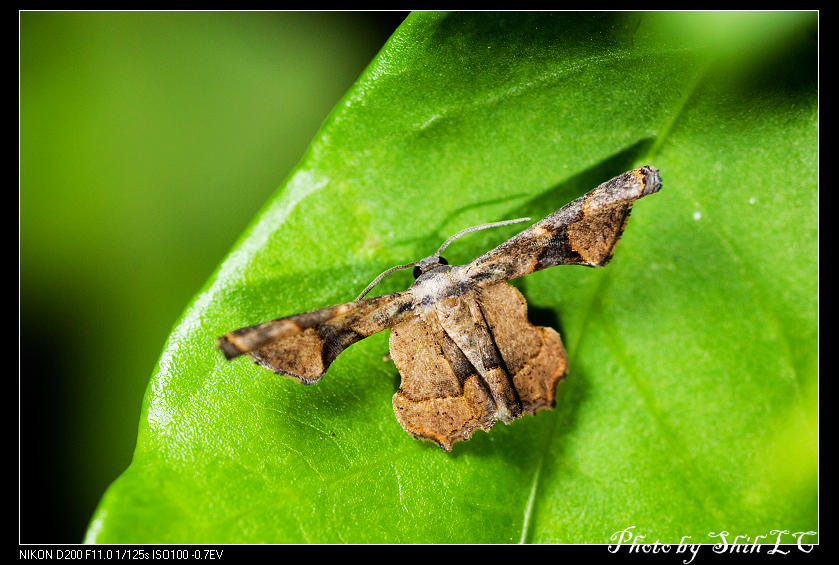
Monobolodes prunaria

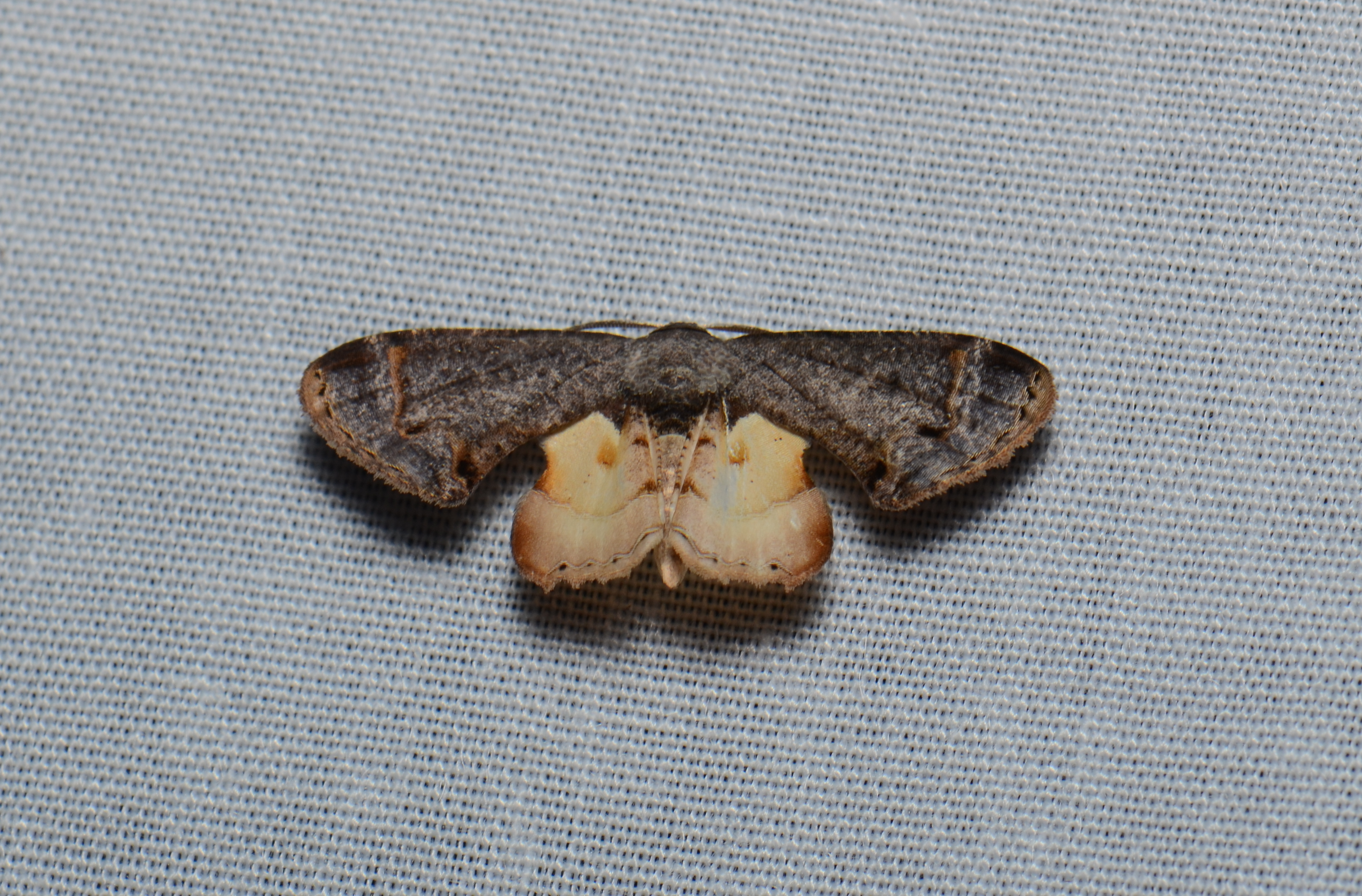
Phazaca erosioides

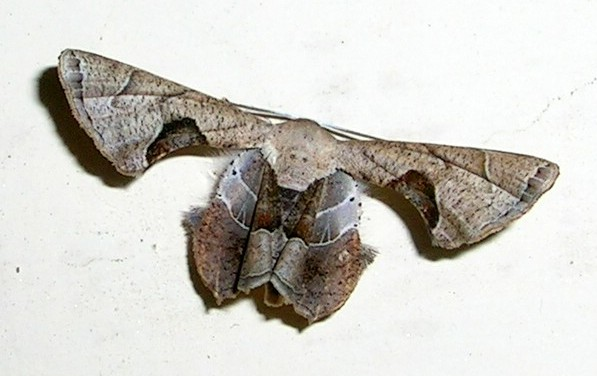
Phazaca leucocera

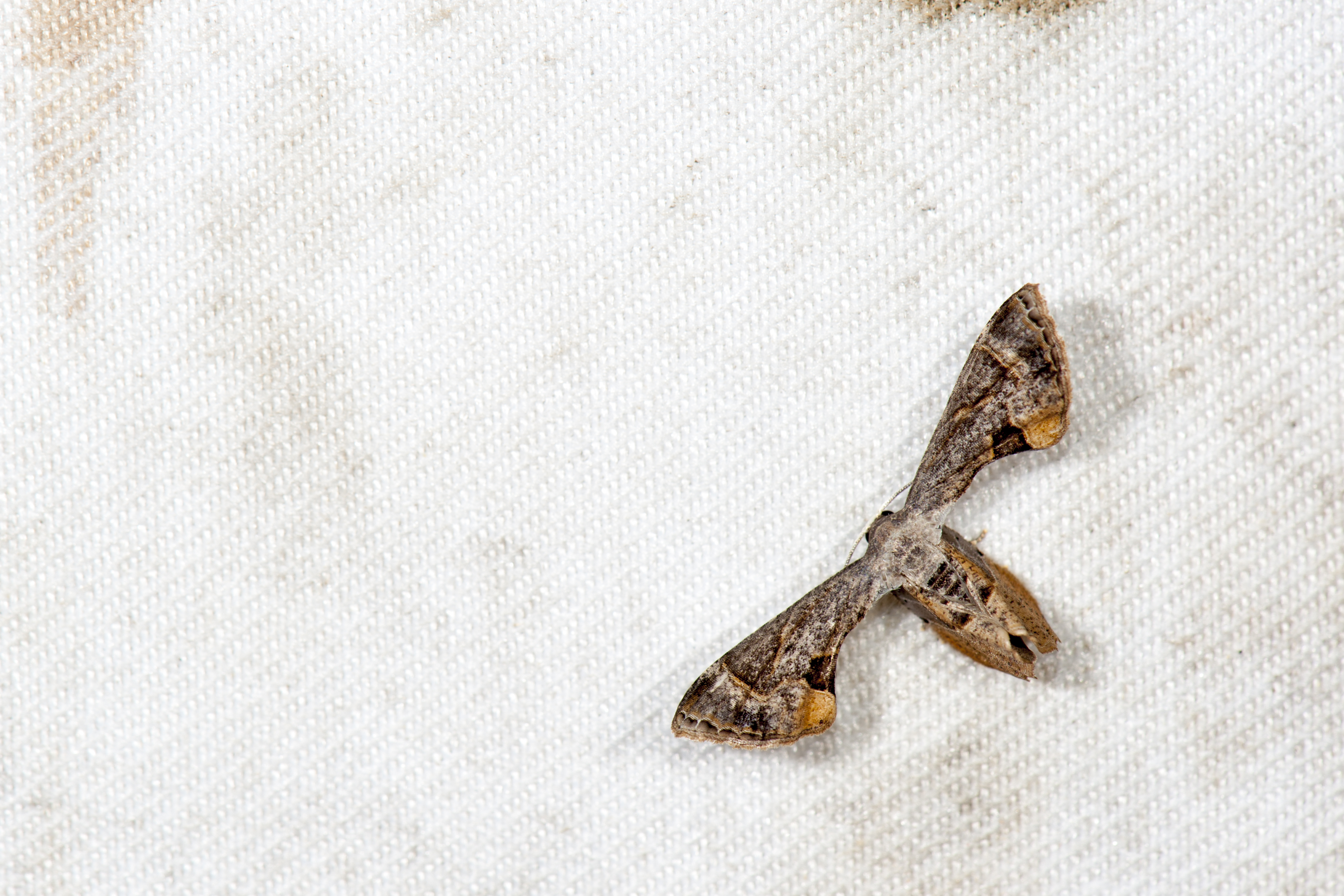
Phazaca theclatus

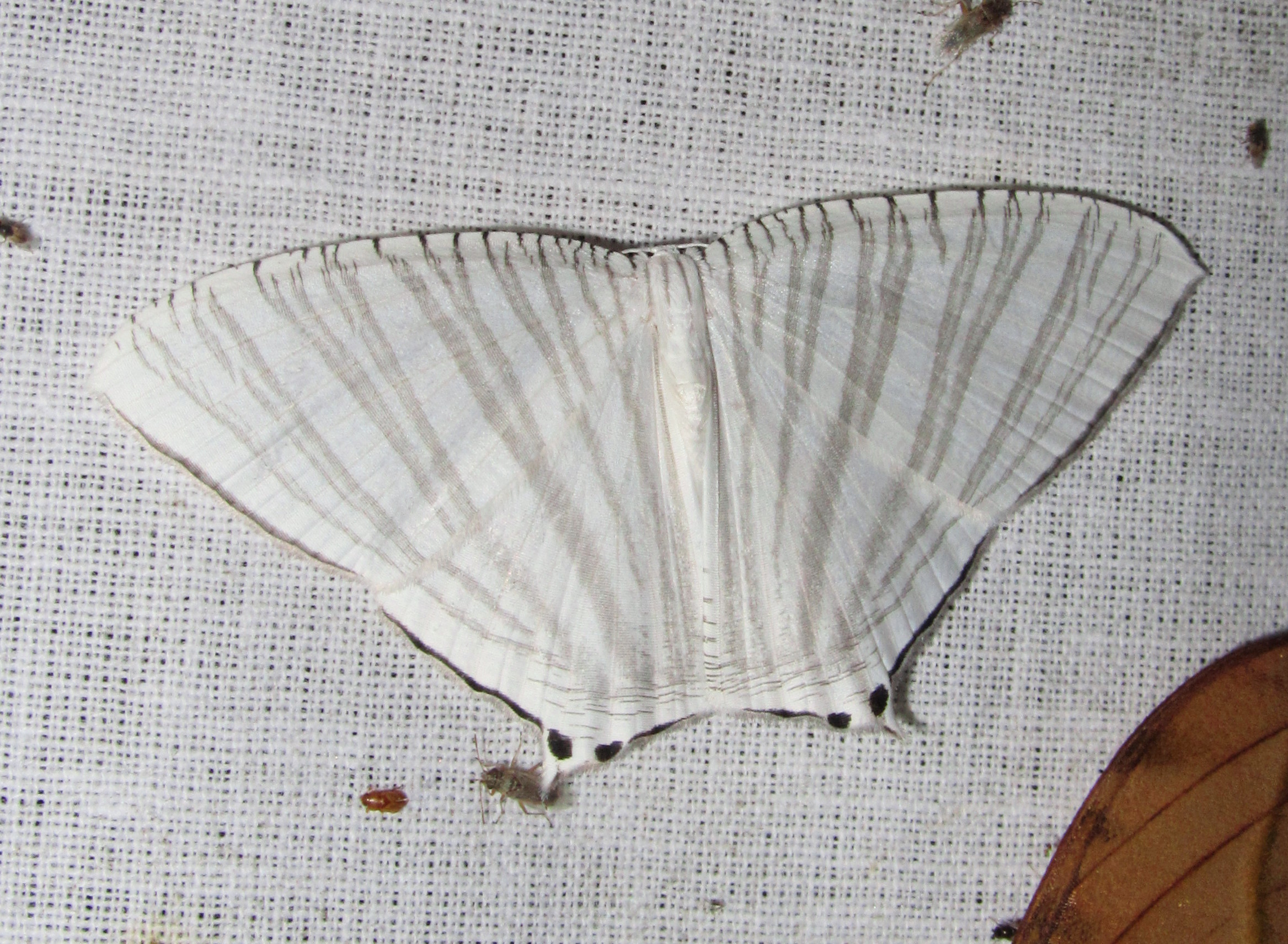
Pseudomicronia advocataria

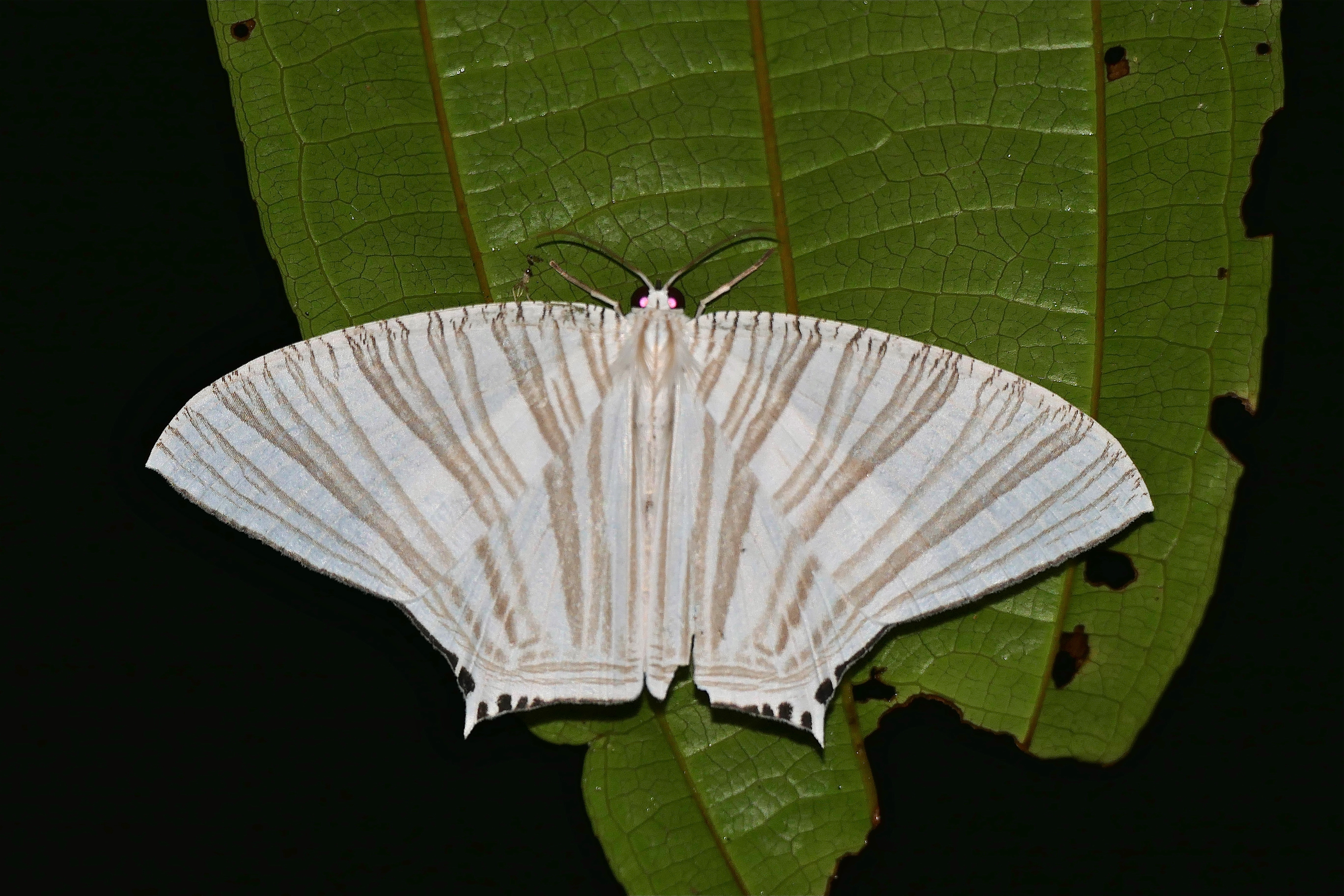
Strophidia caudata

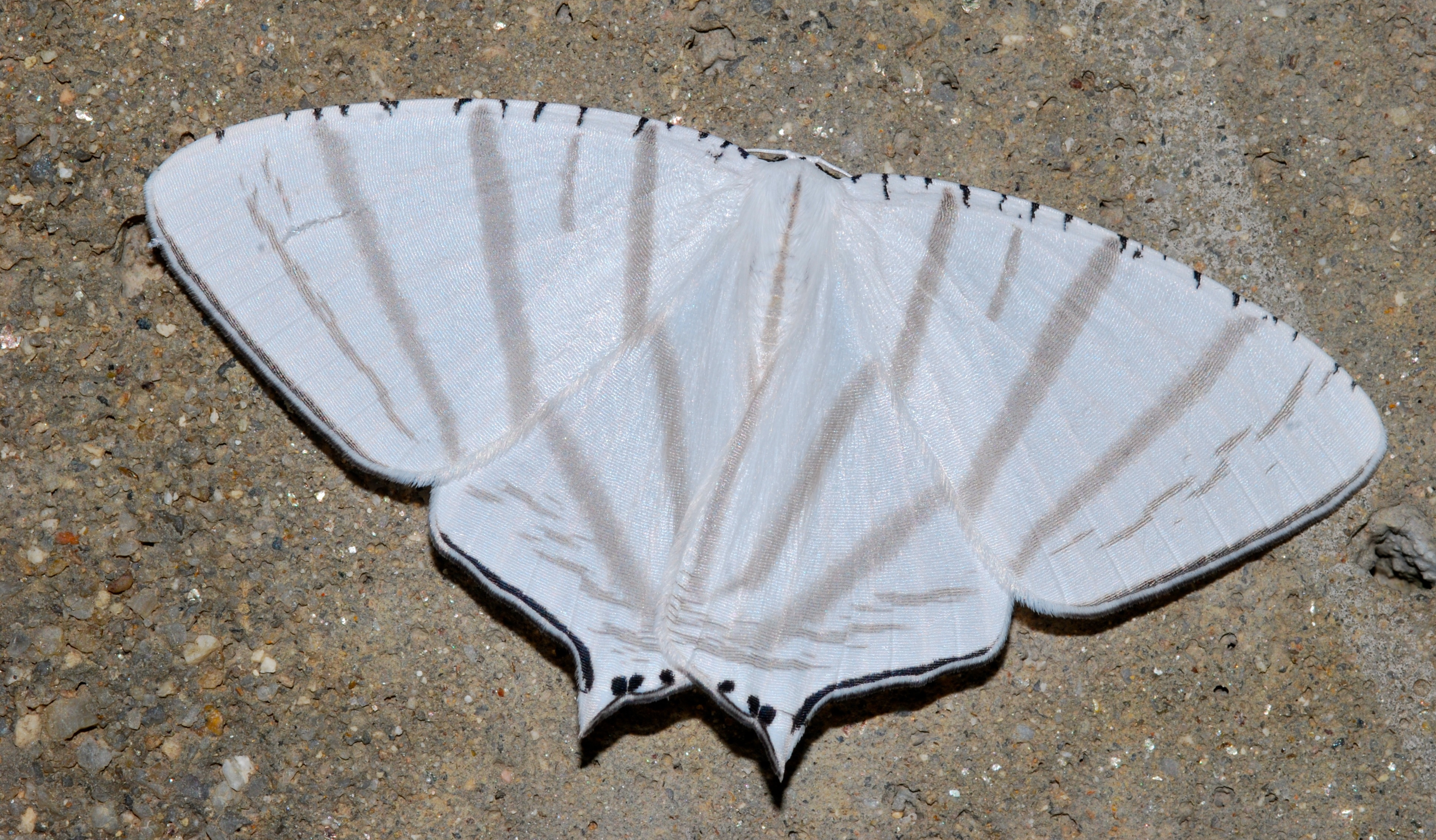
Urapteroides astheniata

=== Urodidae - false burnet moths ===
- Geoesthia ceylonica Jae-Cheon Sohn, 2014

=== Xyloryctidae - giant micromoths ===
- Comocritis pieria Meyrick, 1906
- Opisina arenosella Walker, 1864

=== Yponomeutidae - ermine moths ===
- Atteva fabriciella (Swederus, 1787)
- Pronomeuta sarcopis Meyrick, 1905
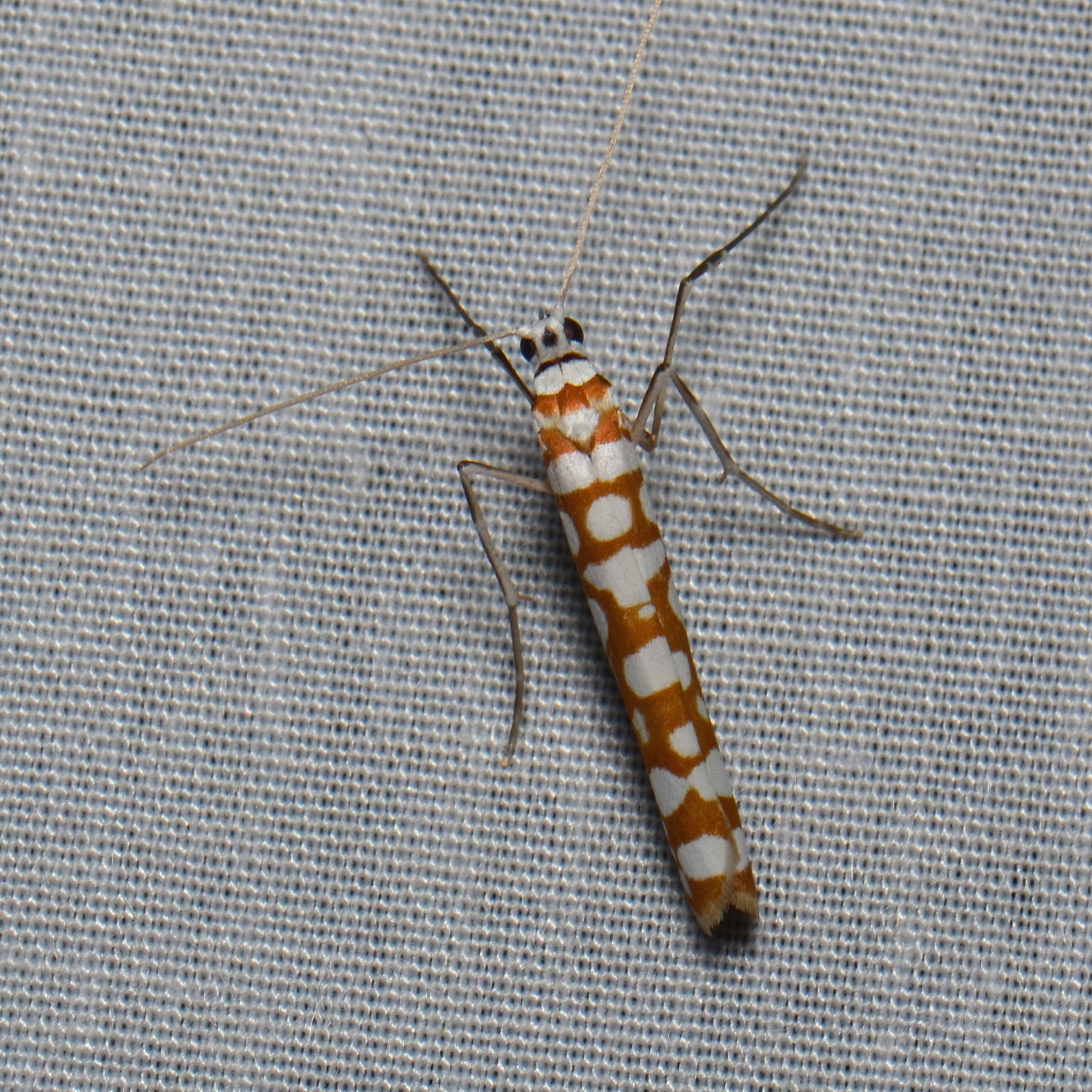
Atteva fabriciella

=== Zygaenidae - burnet and forester moths ===
- Callizygaena albipuncta (Hampson, 1900)
- Callizygaena auratus (Cramer, [1779])
- Cerodendra quadripunctata (Hampson, 1892)
- Chalcosia pretiosa Walker, 1854
- Chalcosia venosa Walker, 1854
- Cyclosia midamia (Herrich-Schäffer, 1853)
- Cyclosia panthona (Stoll, 1780)
- Eterusia aedea (Linnaeus, 1763)
- Heteropan scintillans Walker, 1854
- Procotes diminuta (Walker, 1854)
- Thyrassia subcordata (Walker, 1854)
- Thyrassia virescens (Hampson, 1892)
- Trypanophora trapobanes Walker, 1854
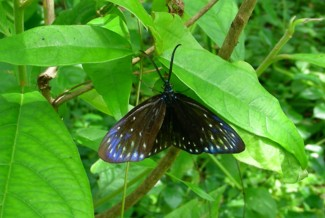
Cylcosia midama

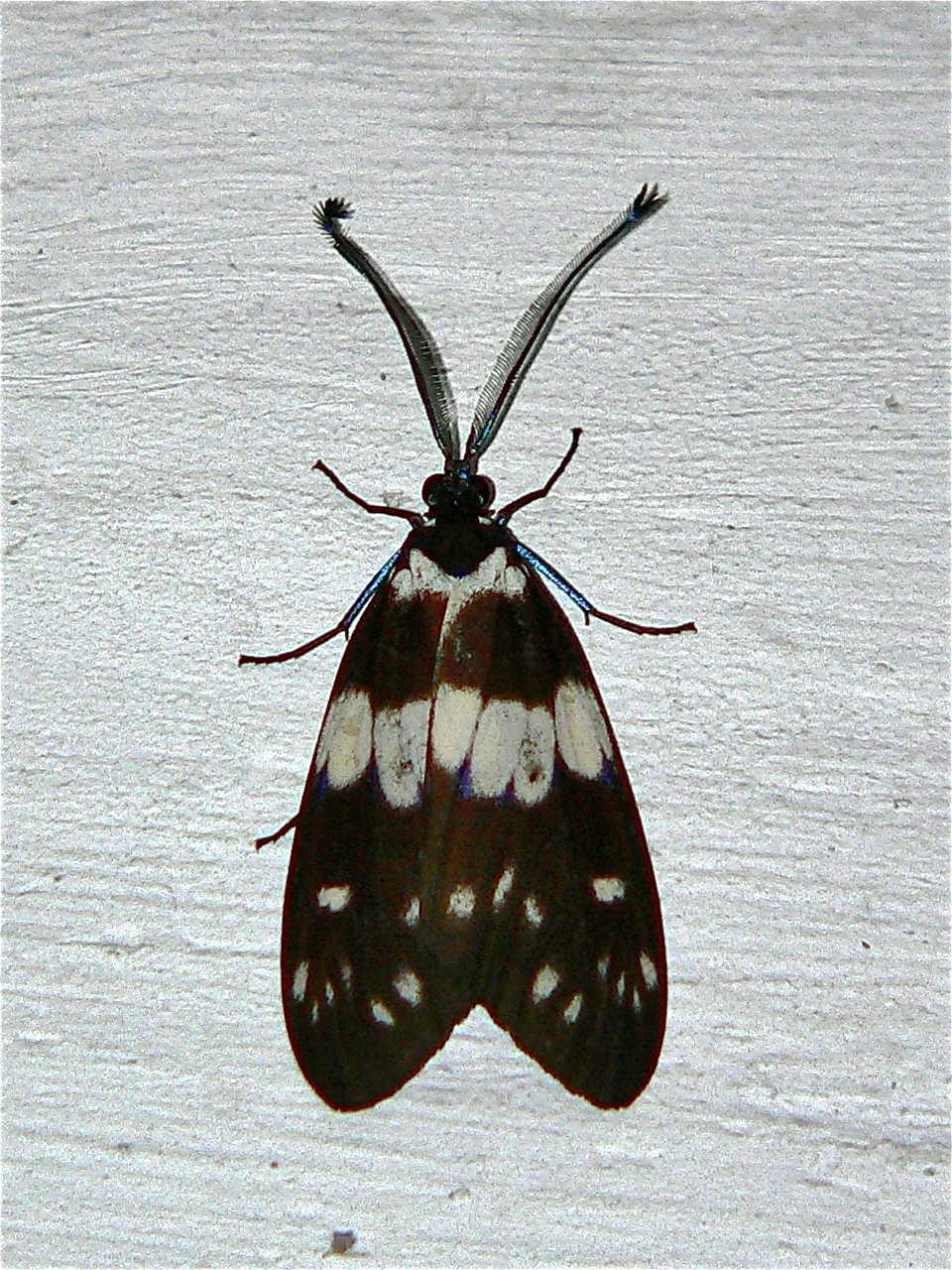
Eterusia aedea

== Gallery ==
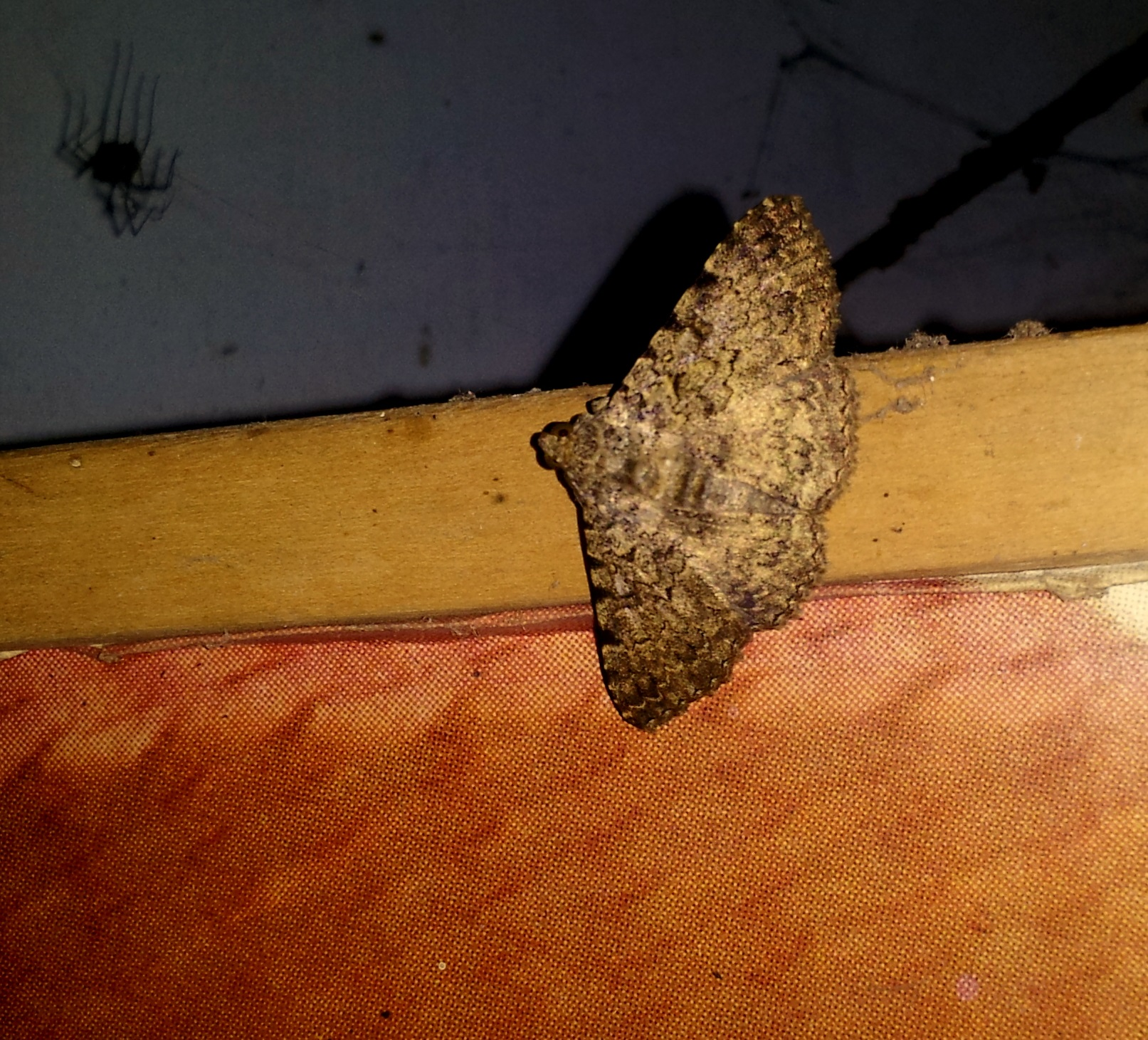
Polydesma boarmoides

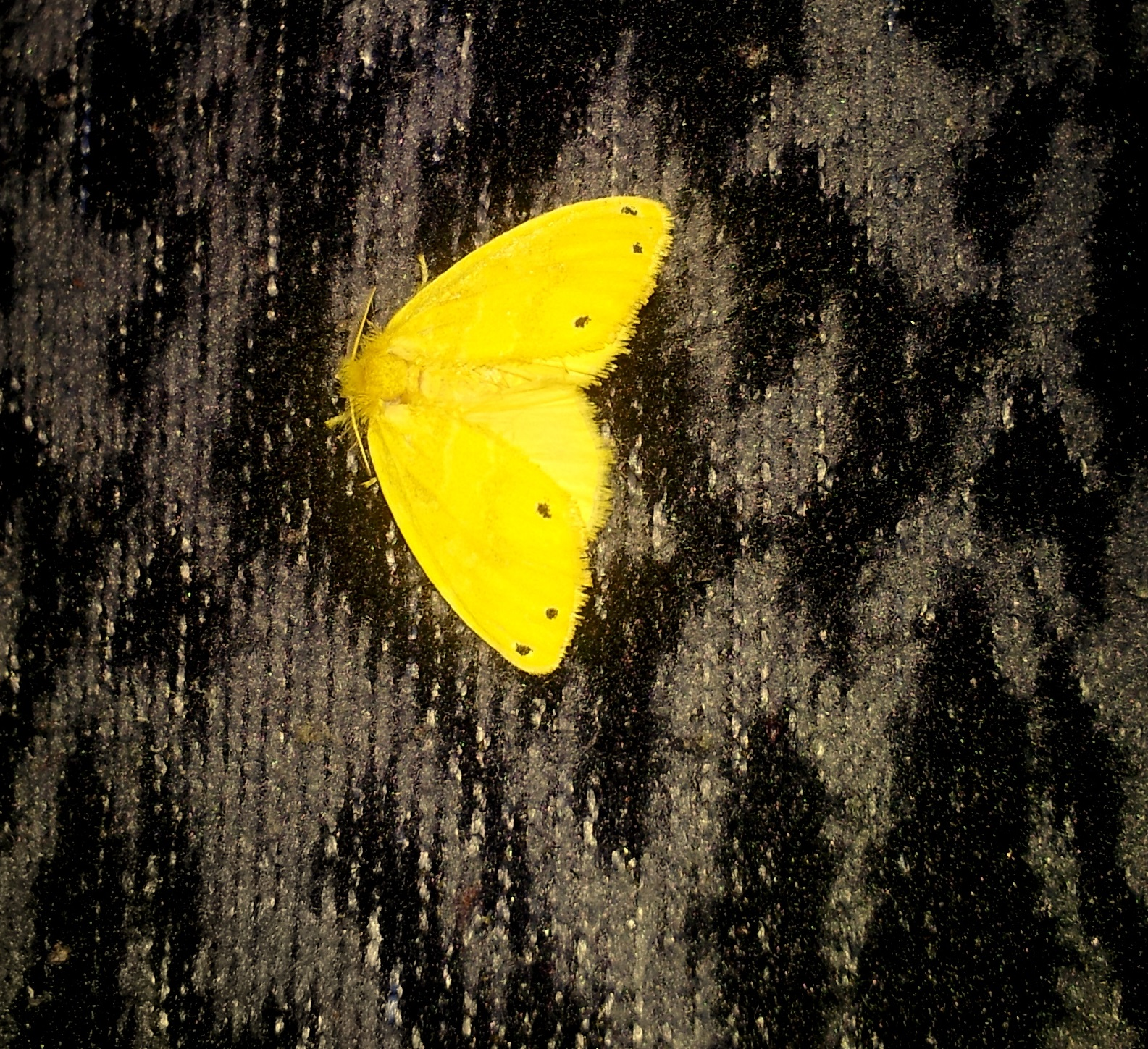
Artaxa sp.

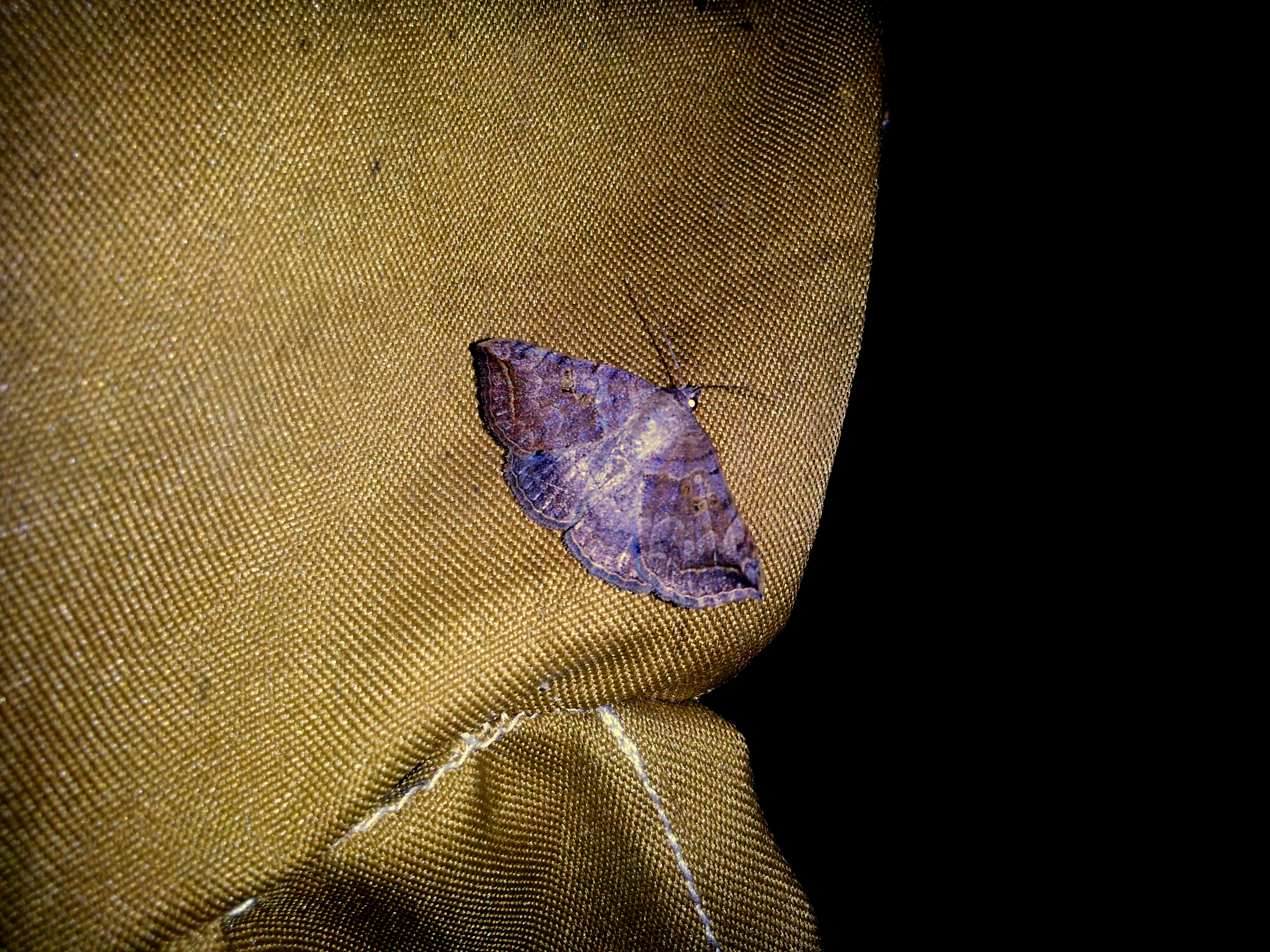

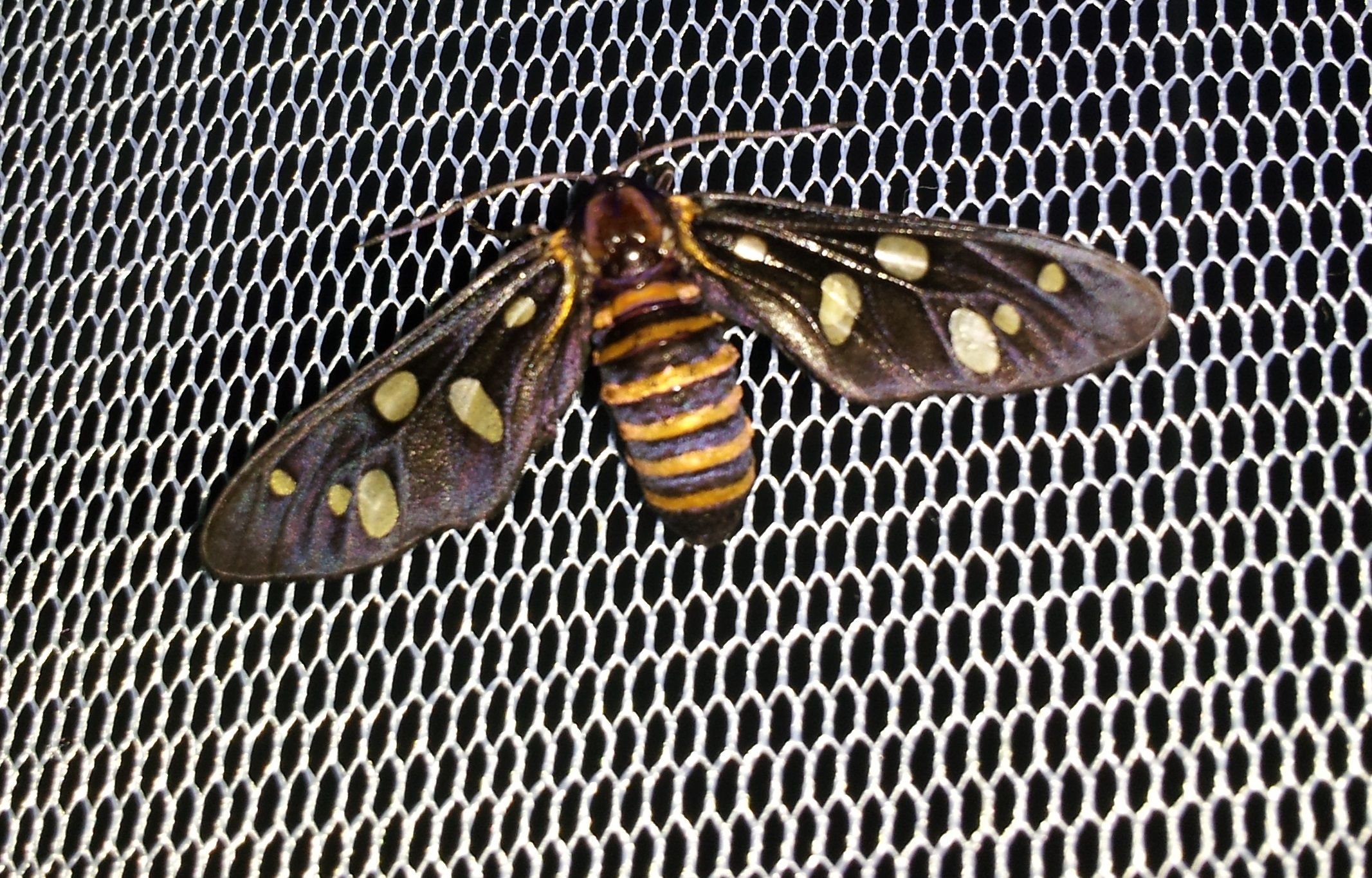
Amata passalis

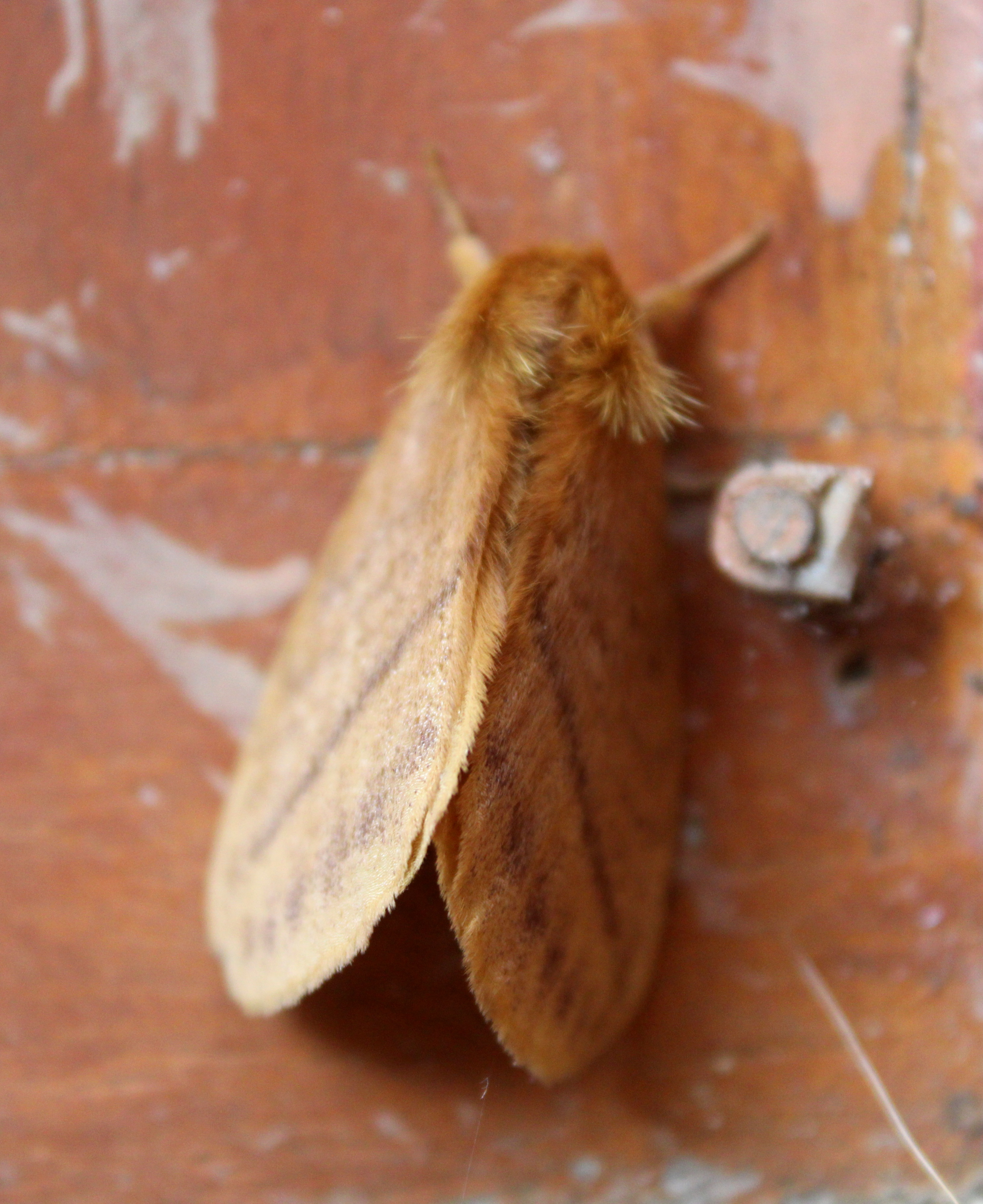
Eupterotinae sp.

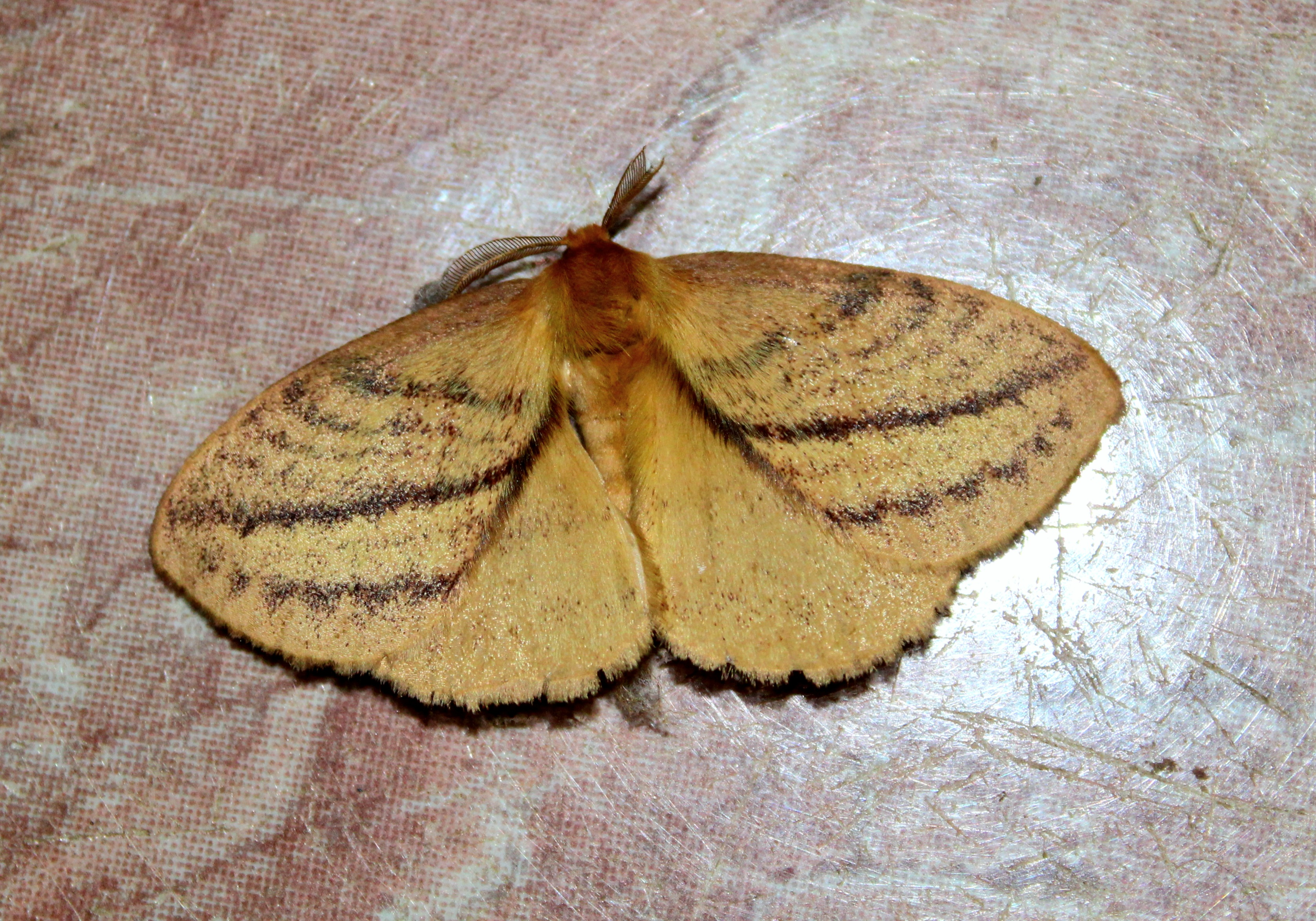
Eupterote sp.

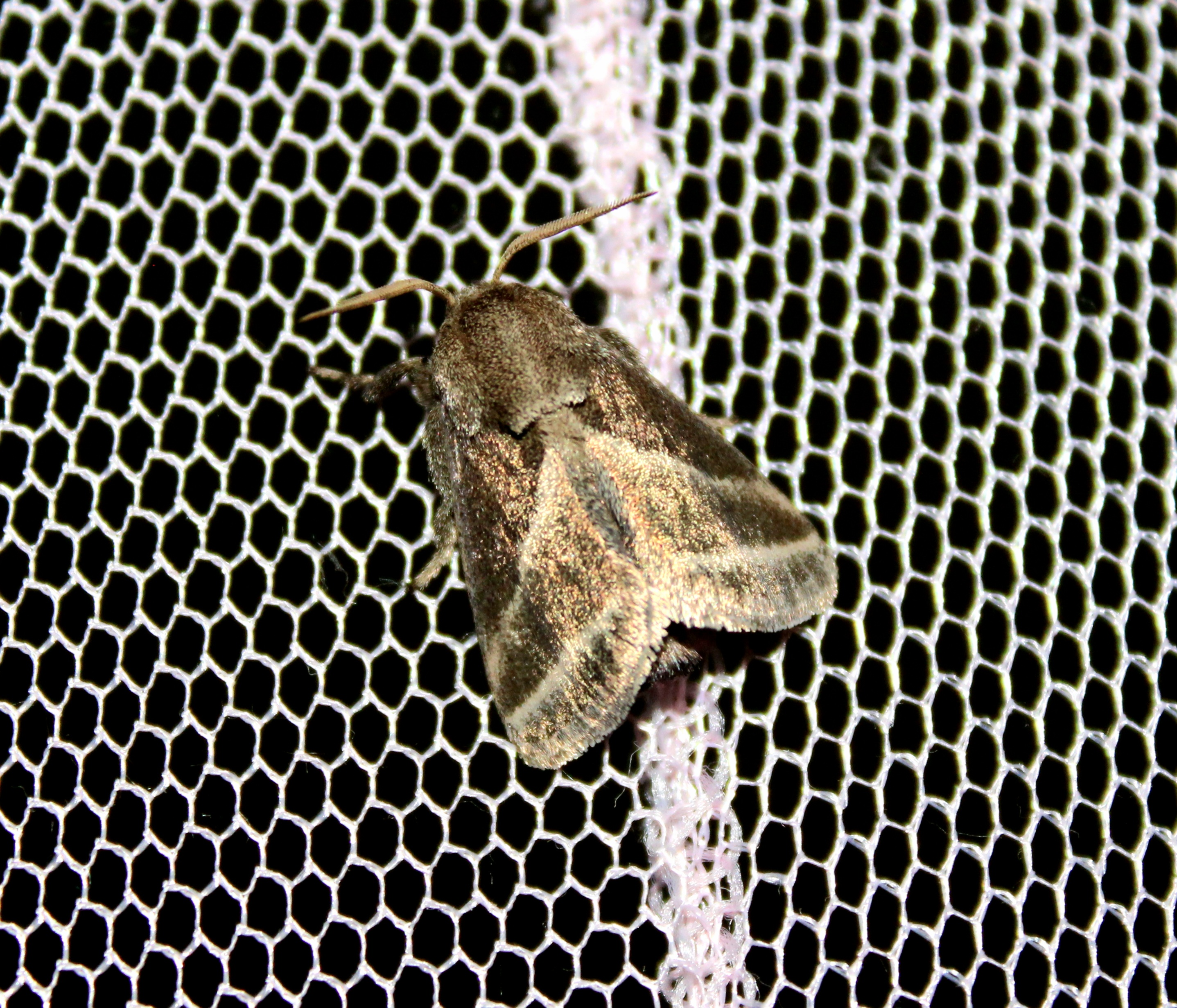
Unknown species

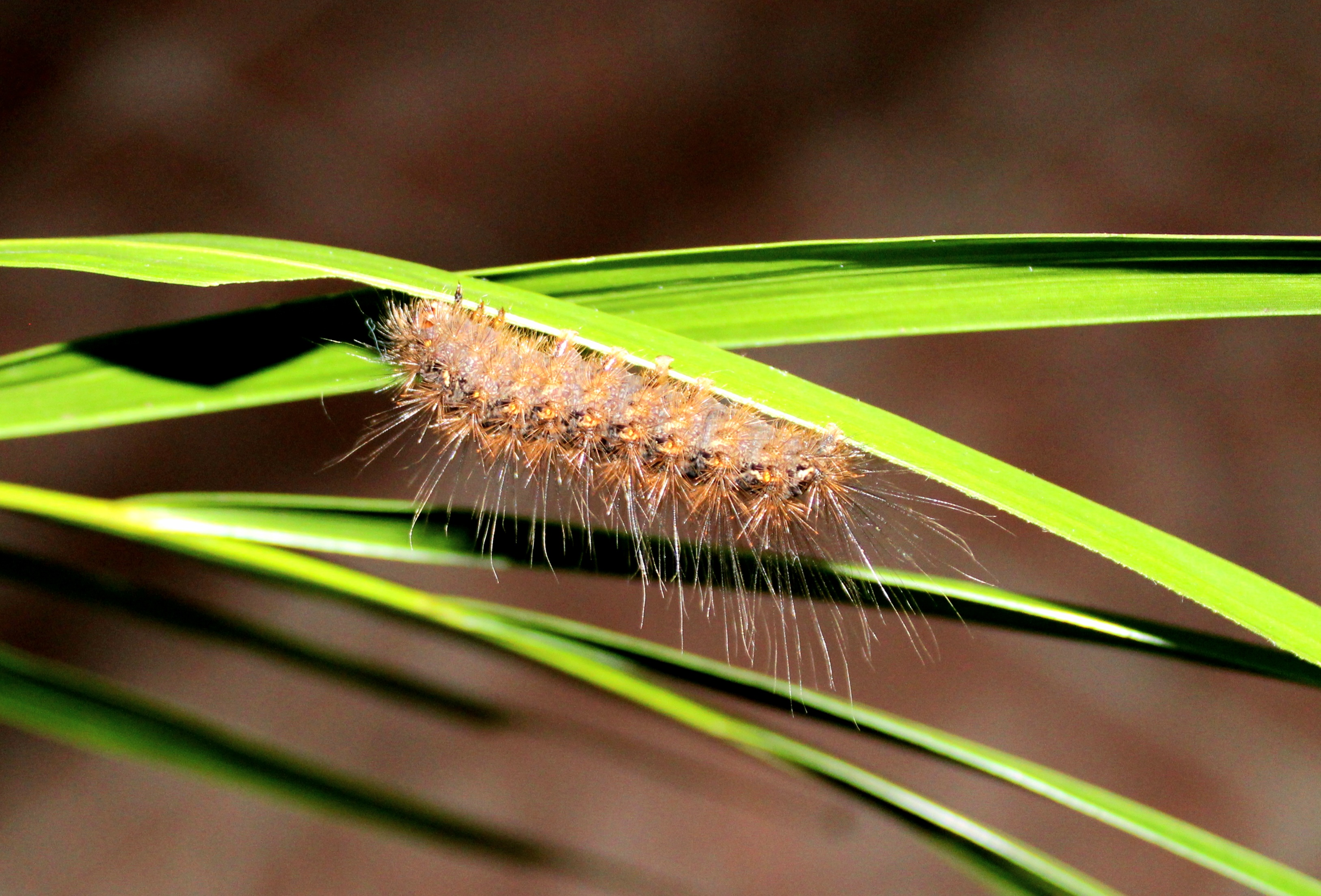
Tiger moth caterpillar

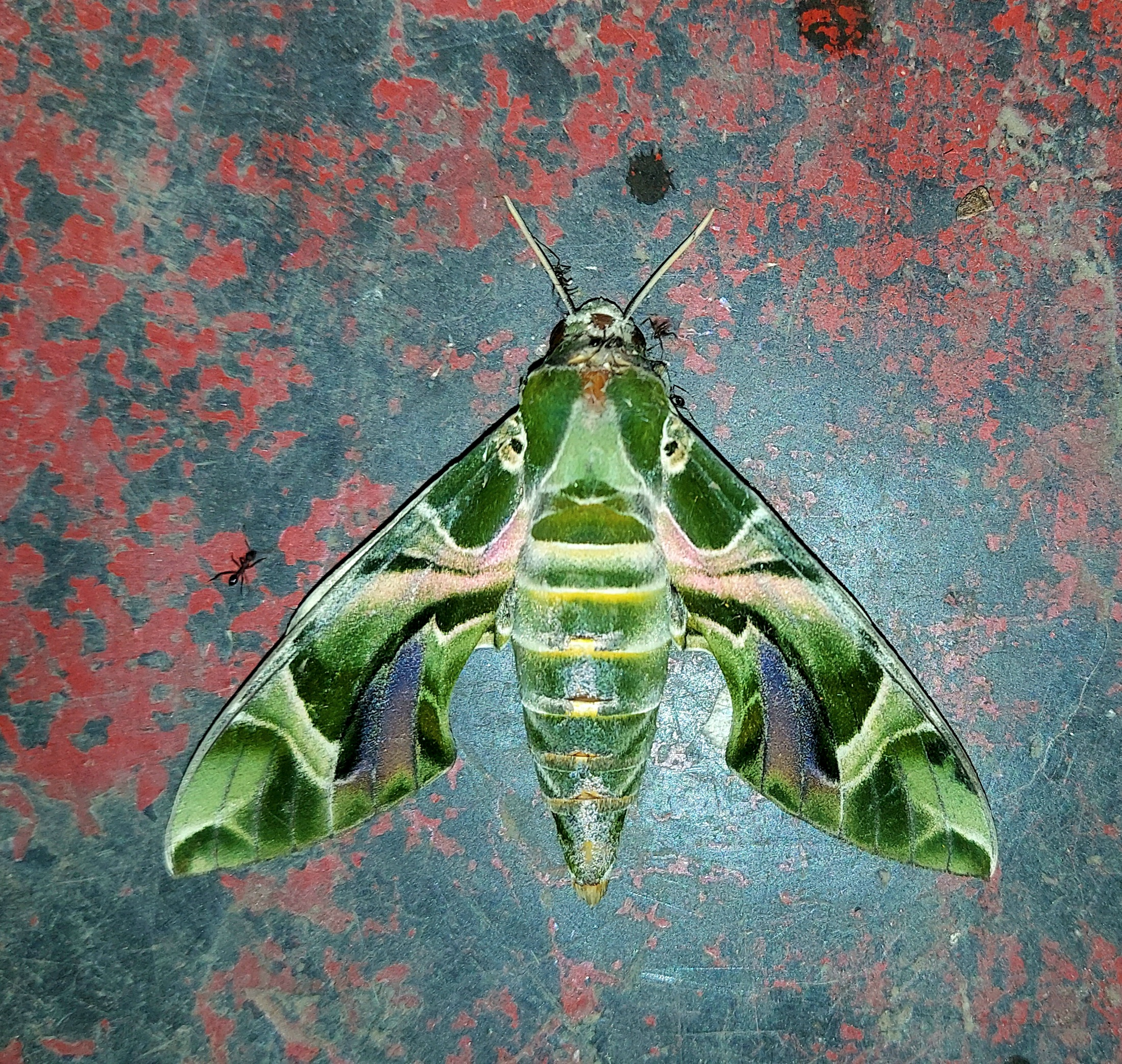
Daphnis nerii

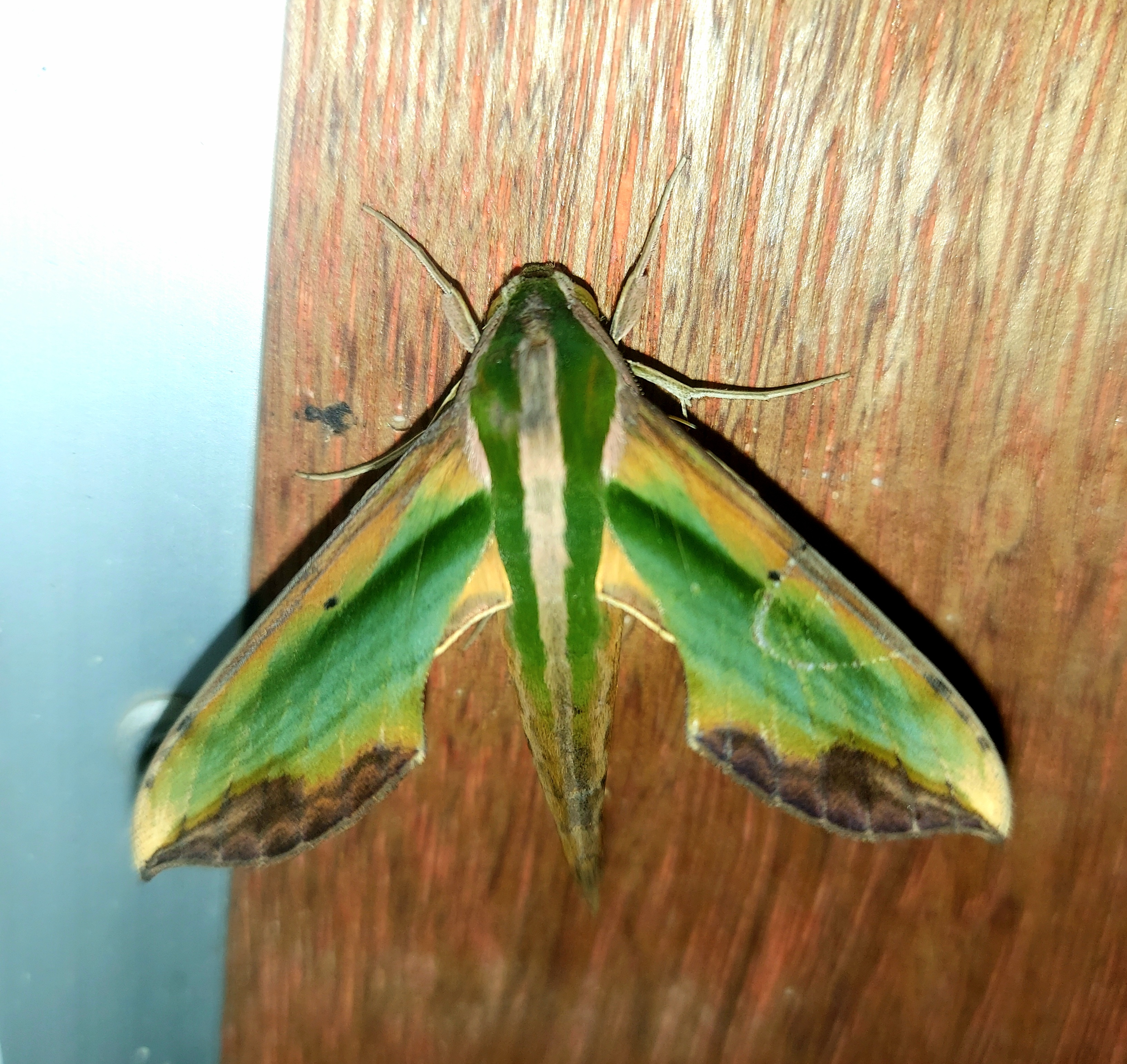
Pergesa actias

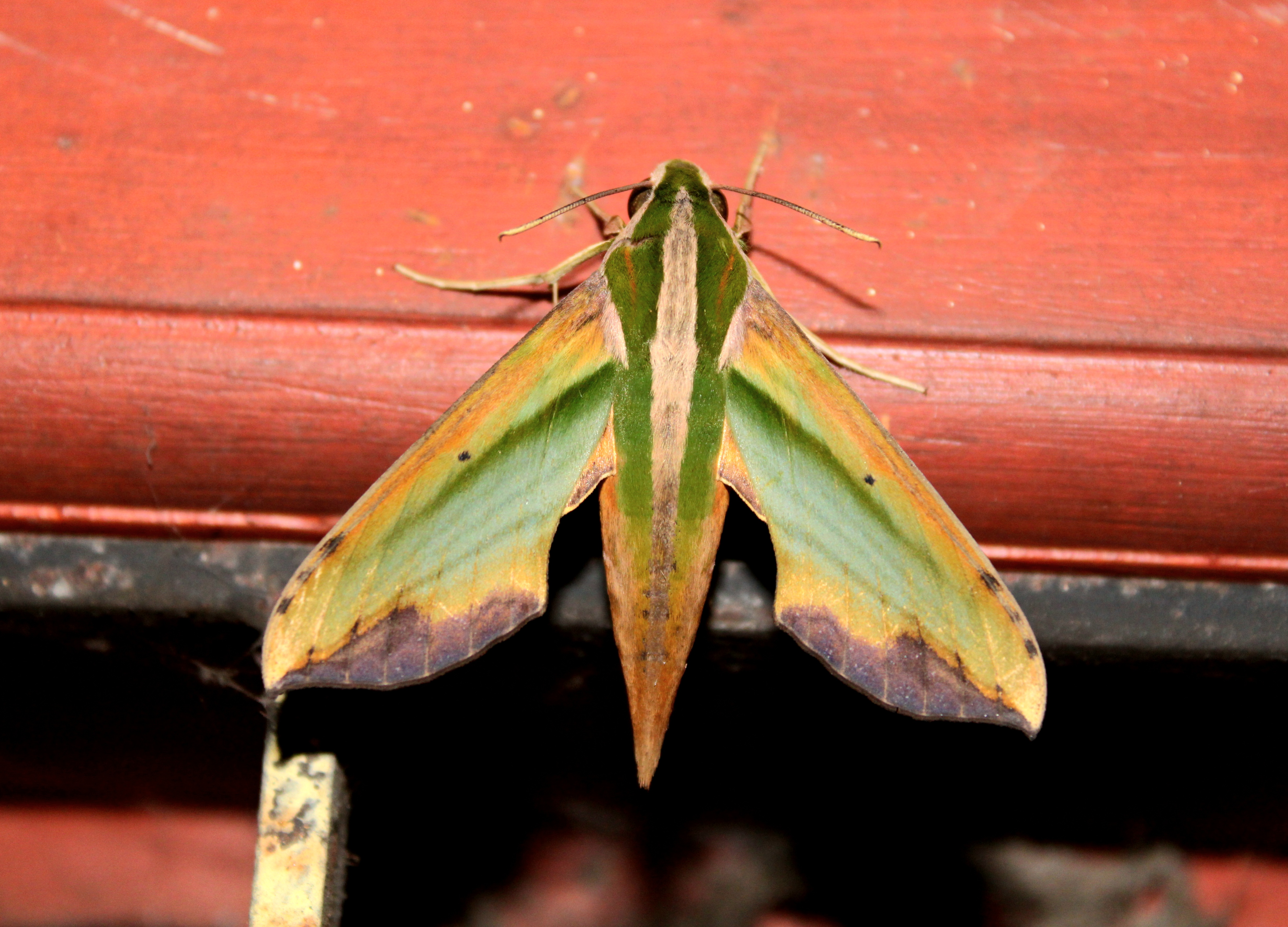
Pergesa actias

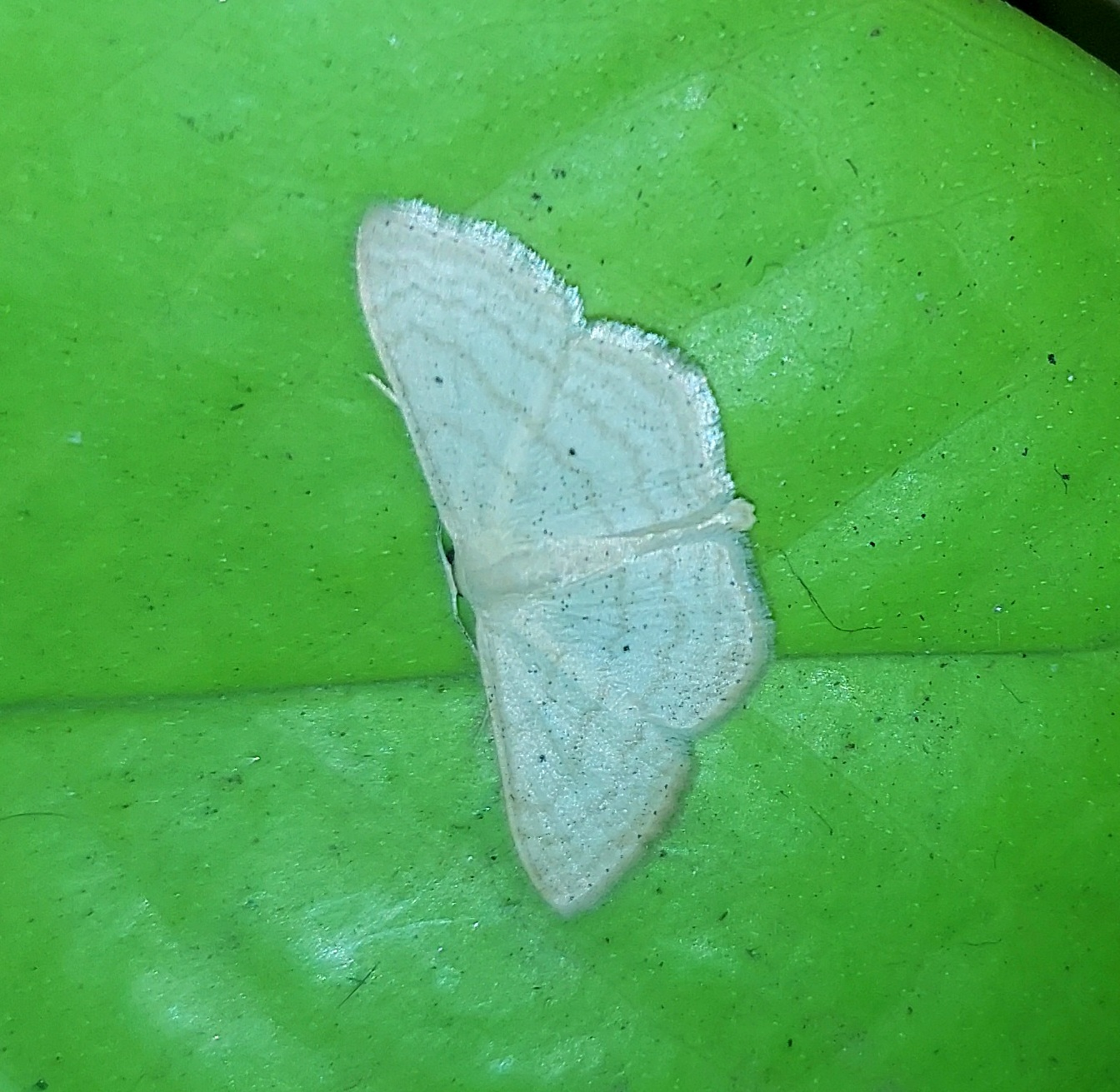
Scopula sp.

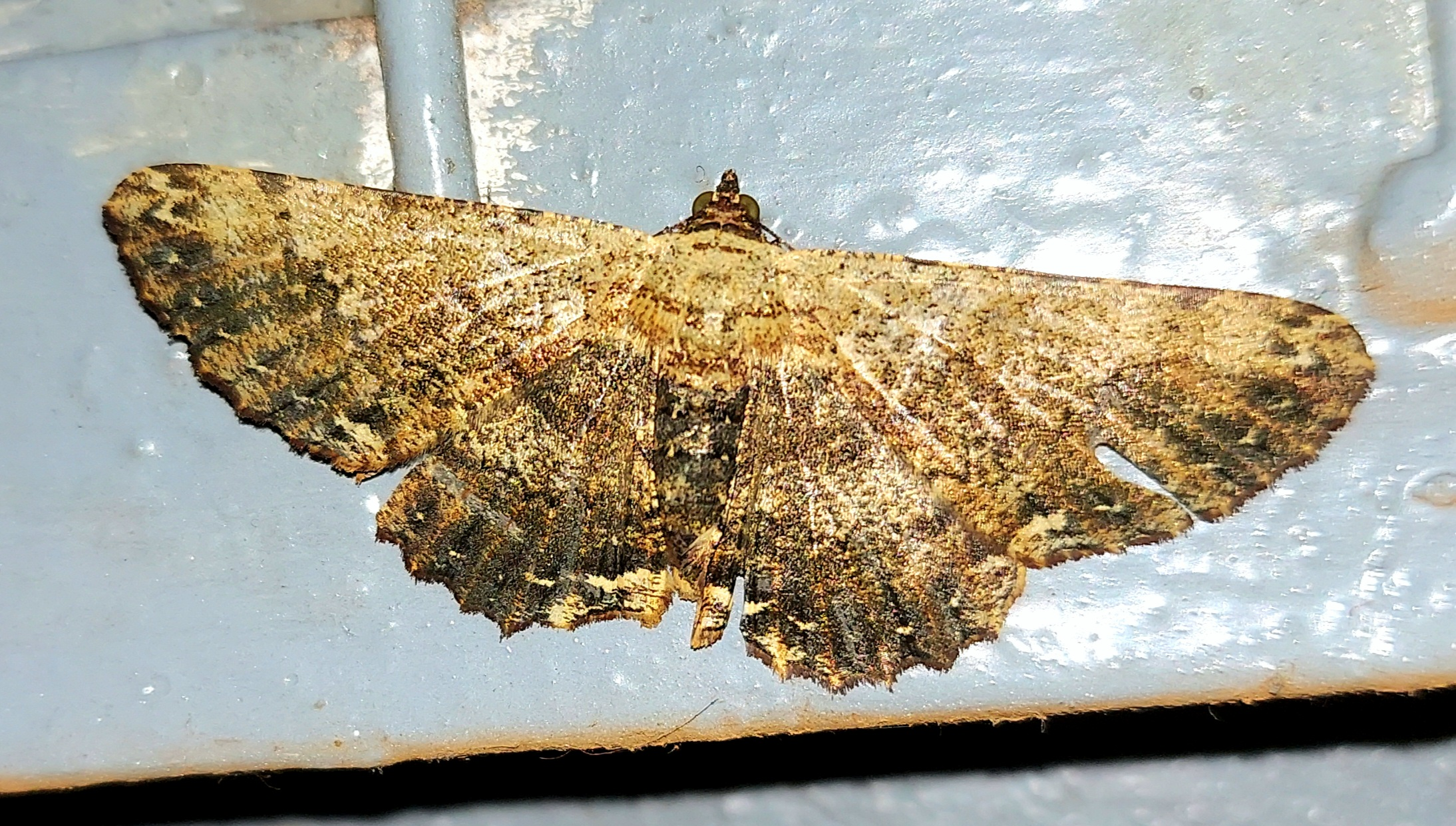
Geometer moth sp.

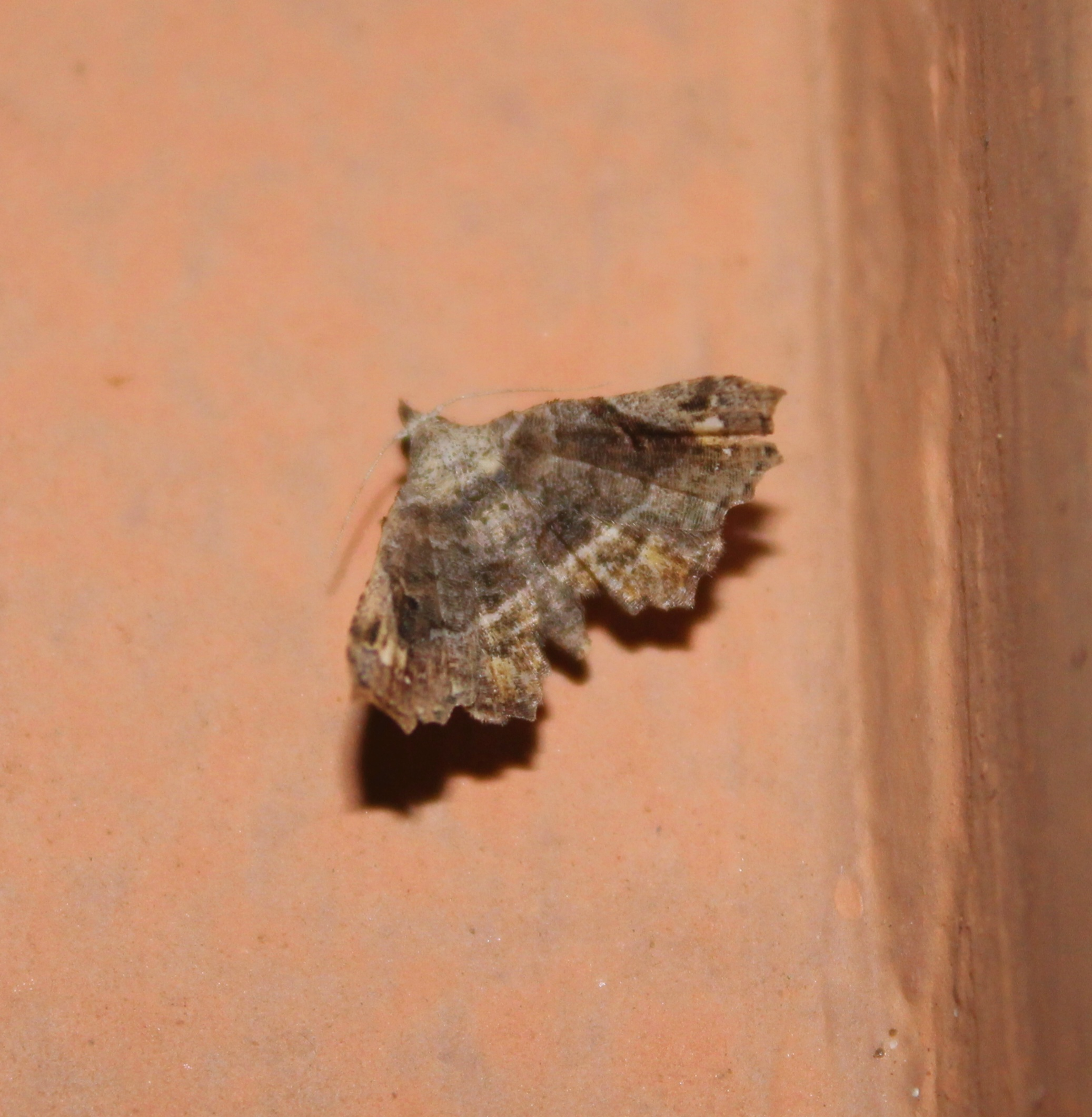
Pangraptinae sp.

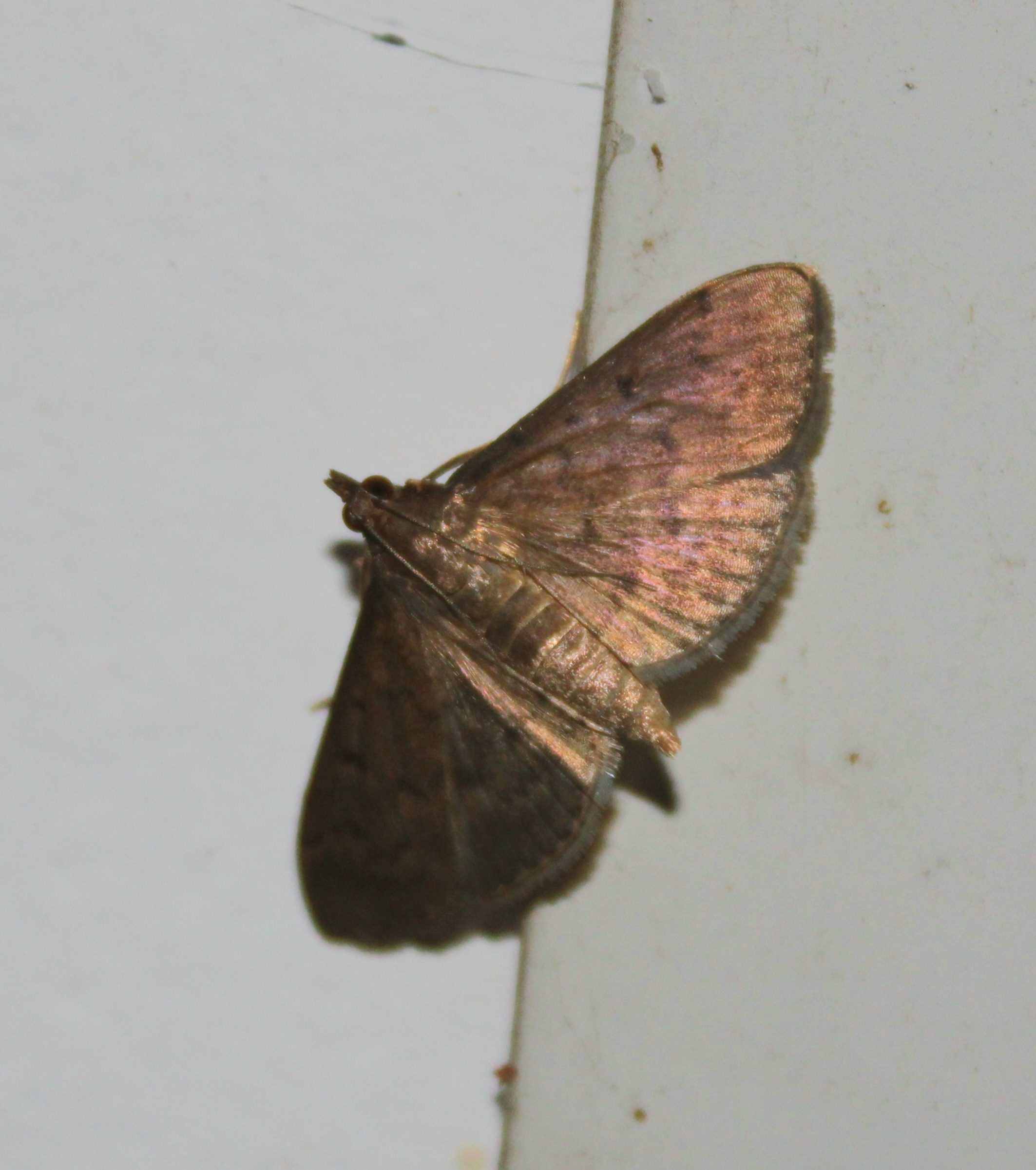
Spilomelinae sp.

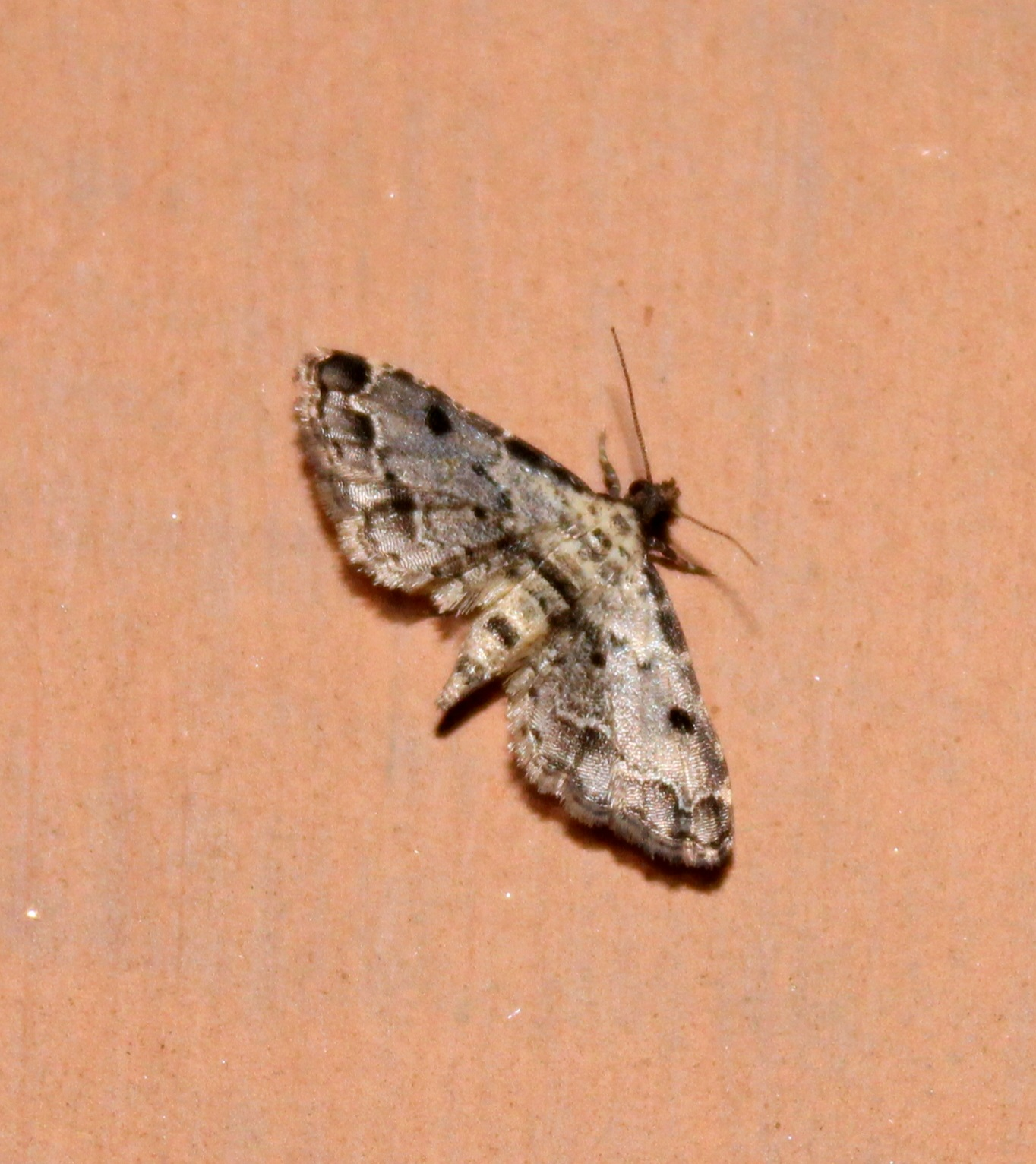
Sufetula sp.

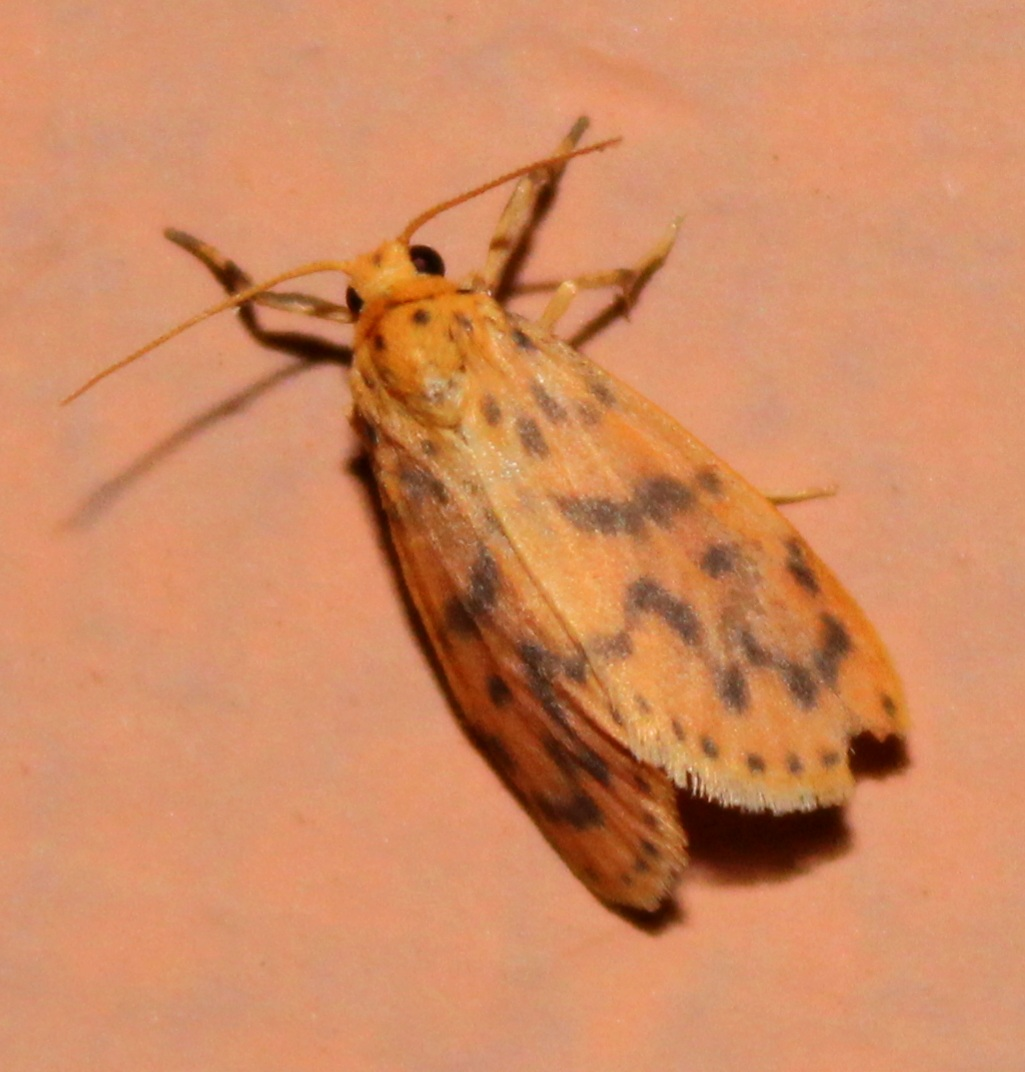
Miltochrista sp.

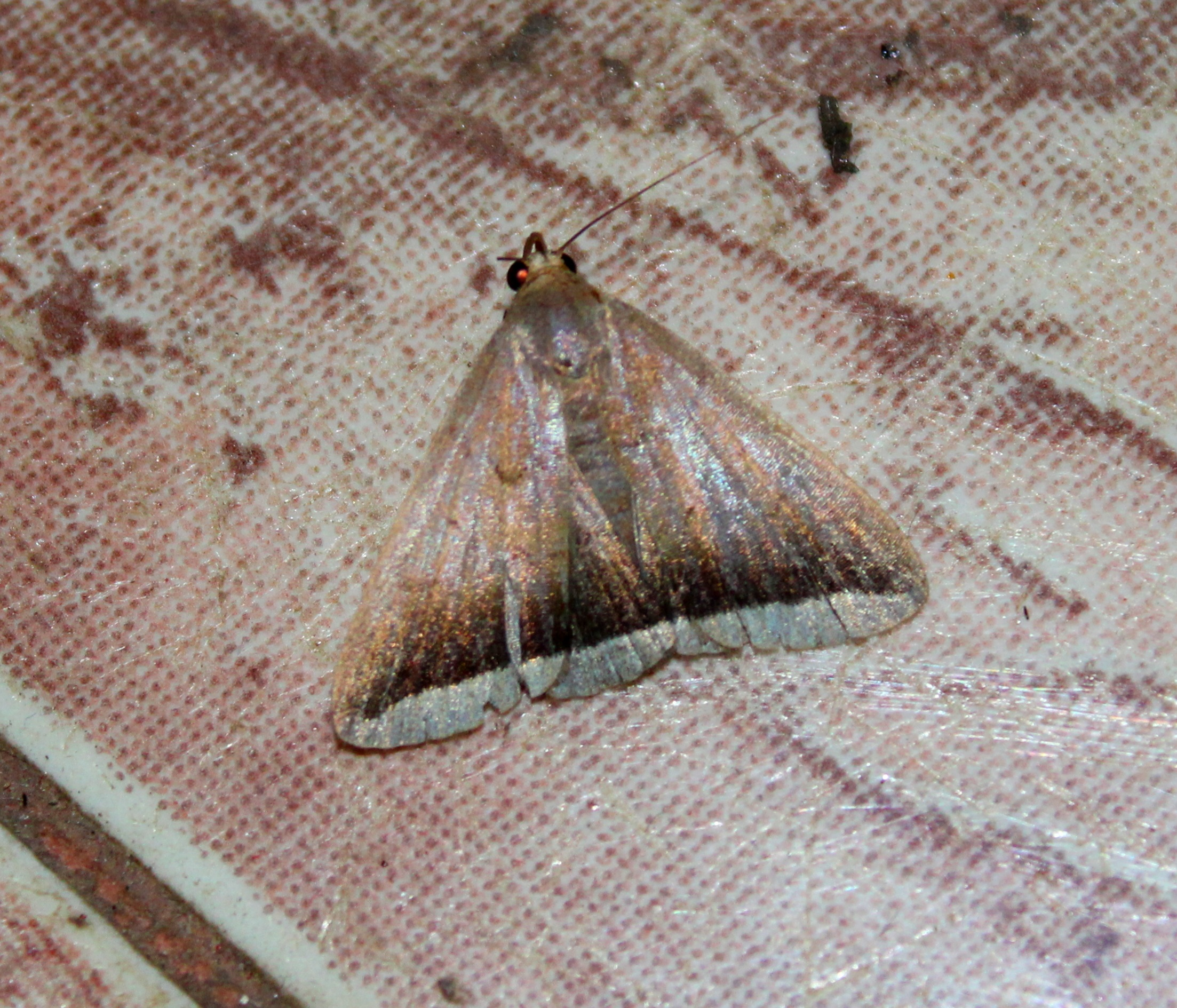
Simplicia bimarginata

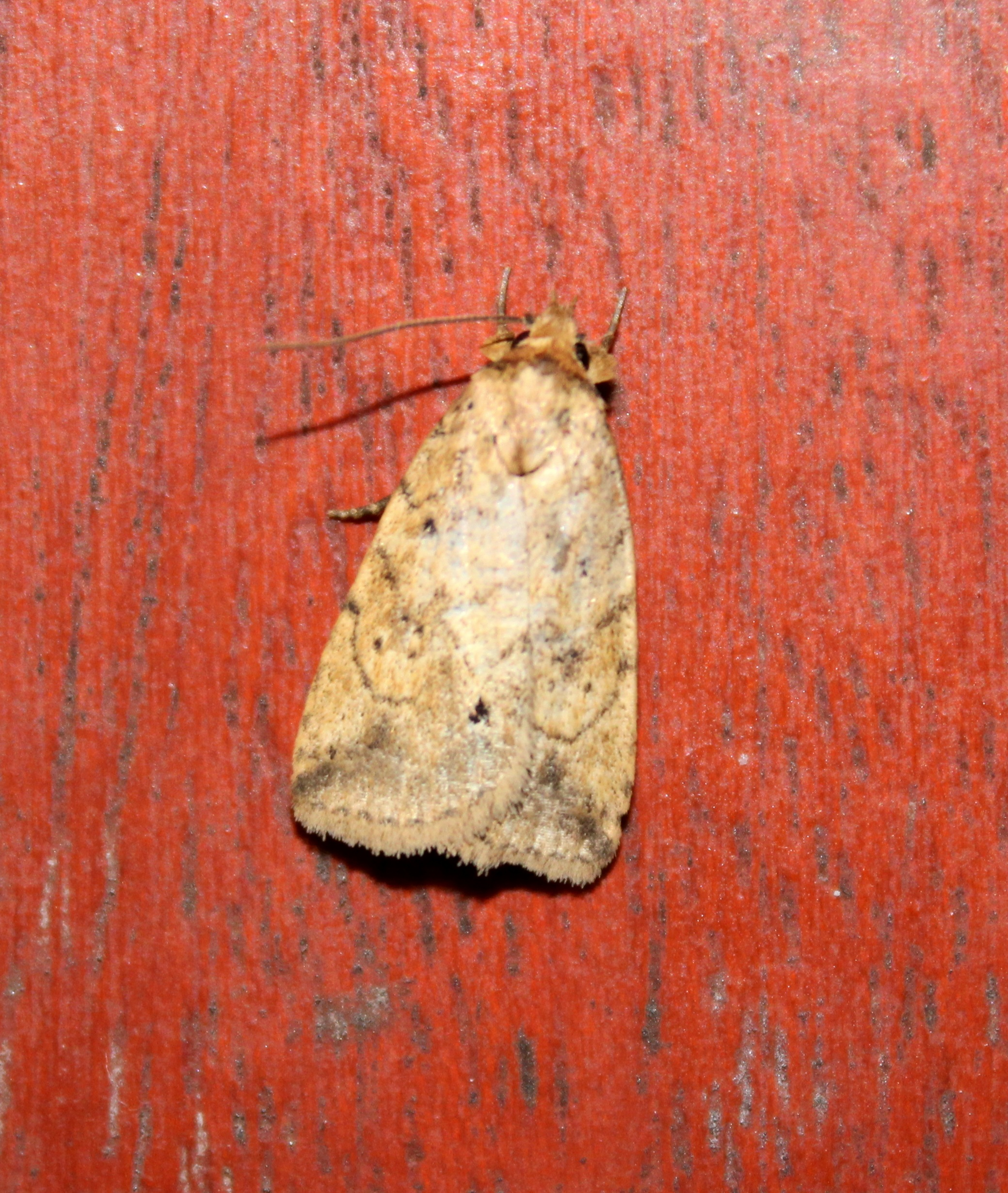
Agonopterix sp.

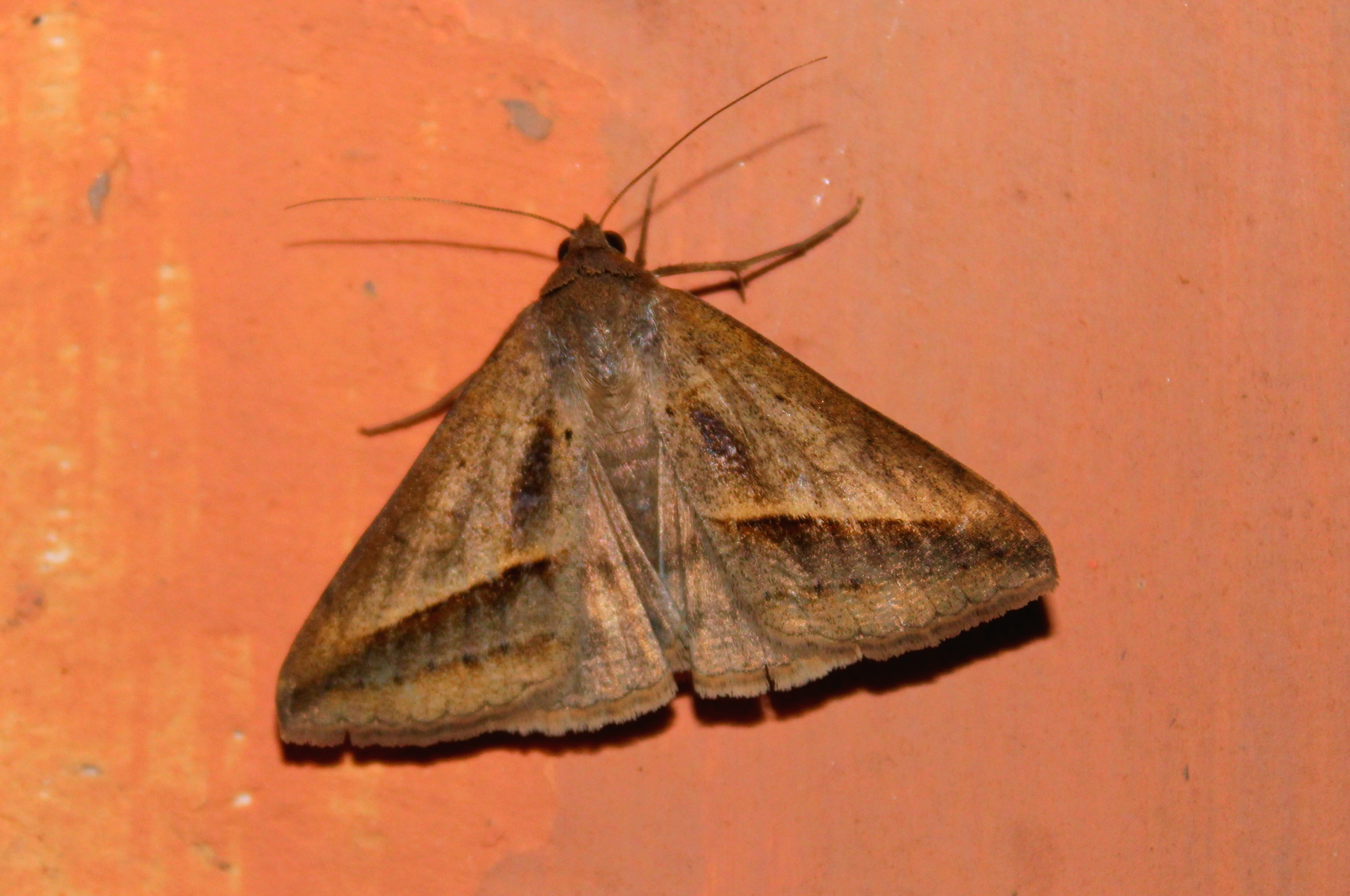
Mocis frugalis

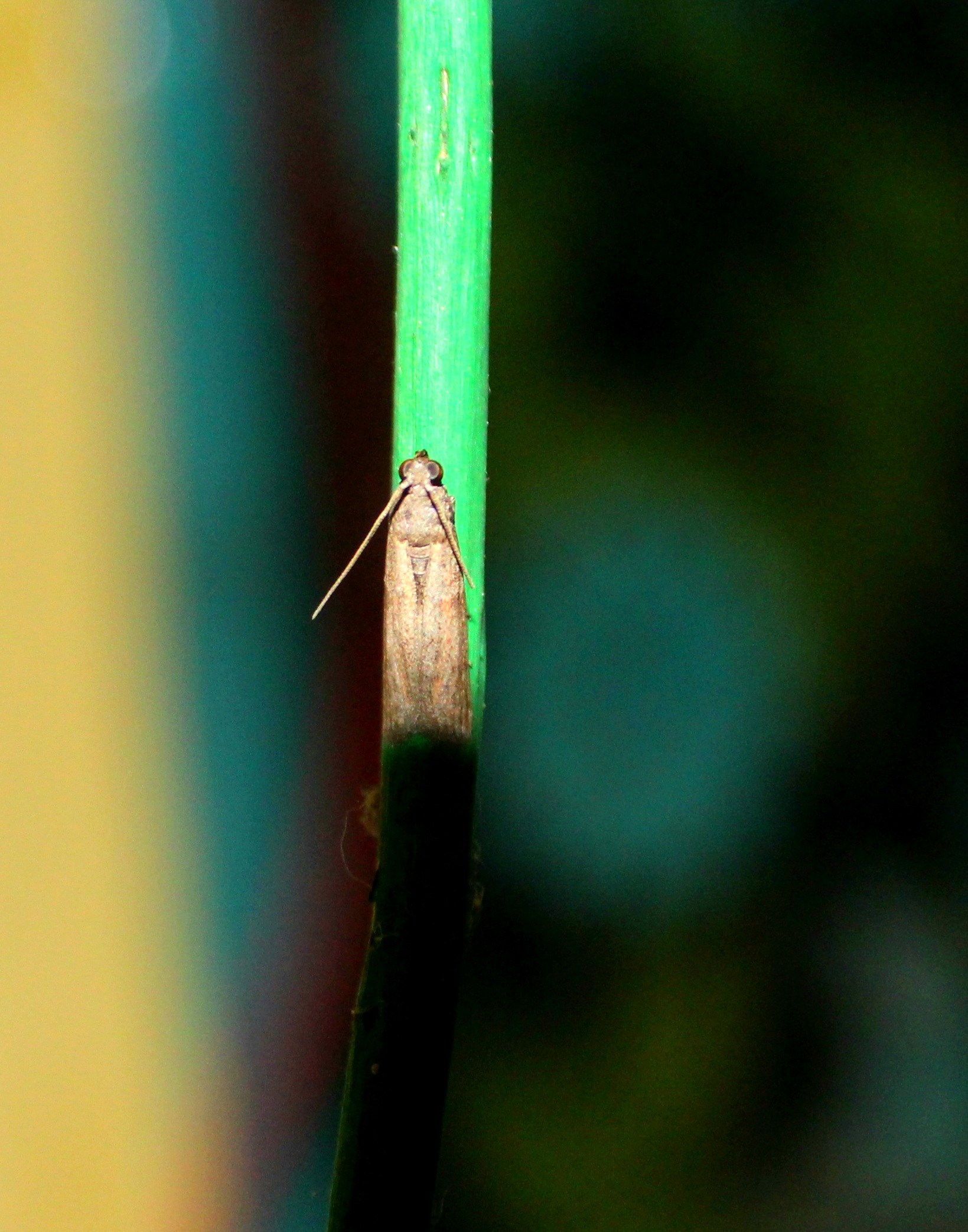
Phereoeca uterella

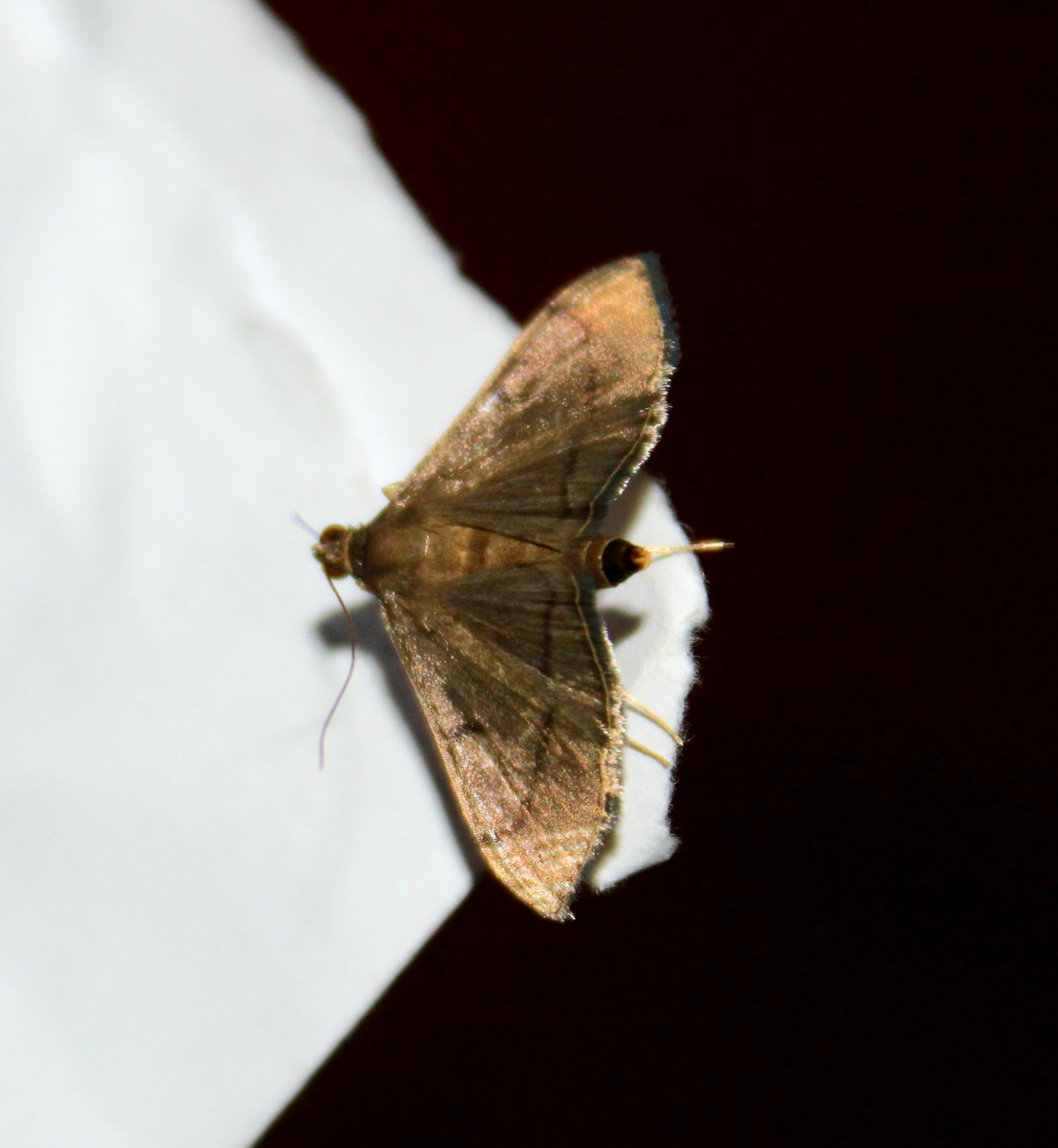
Bradina sp.

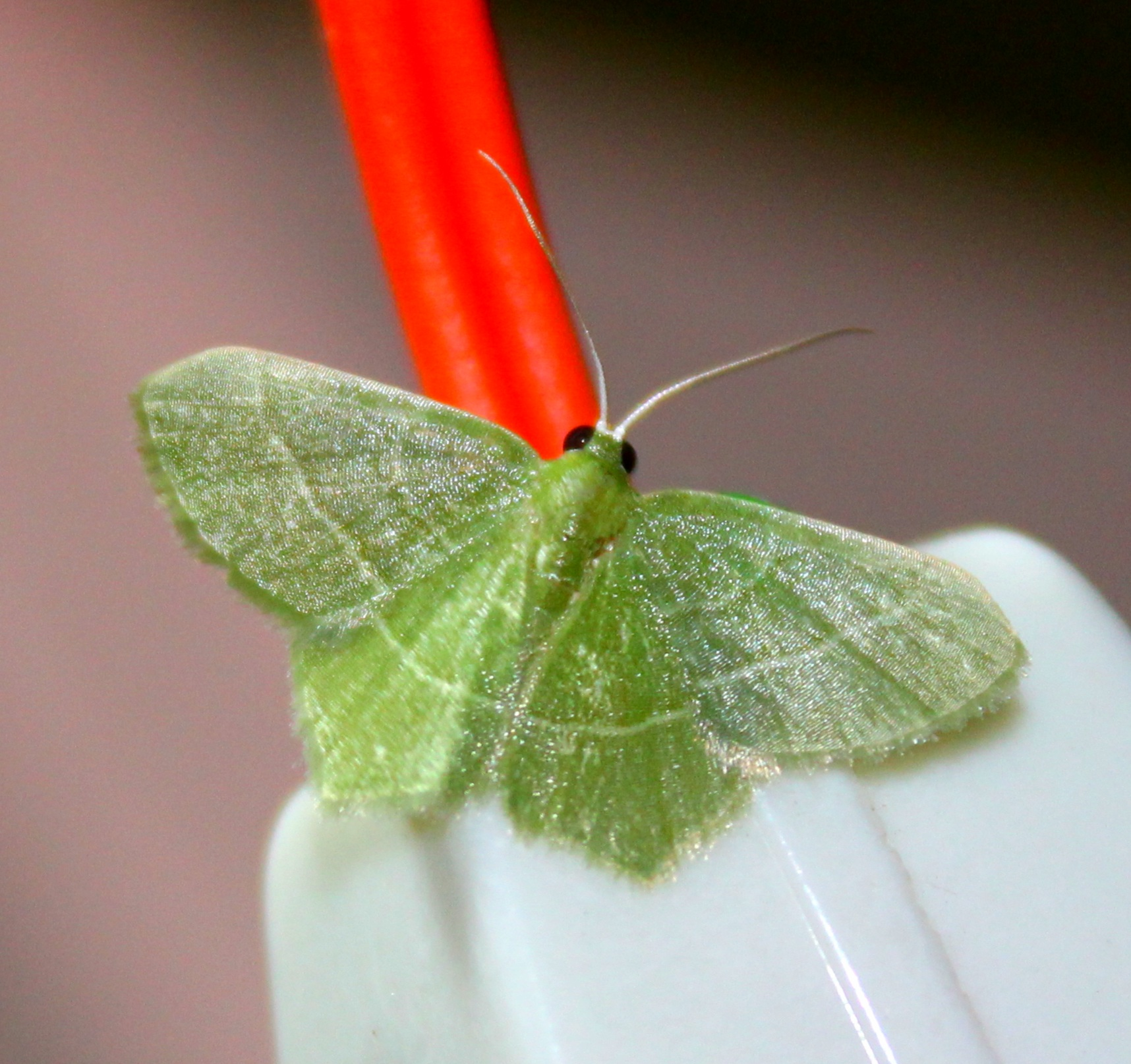
Chlorissa sp.

== See also ==
- List of butterflies of Sri Lanka
- George Hampson
