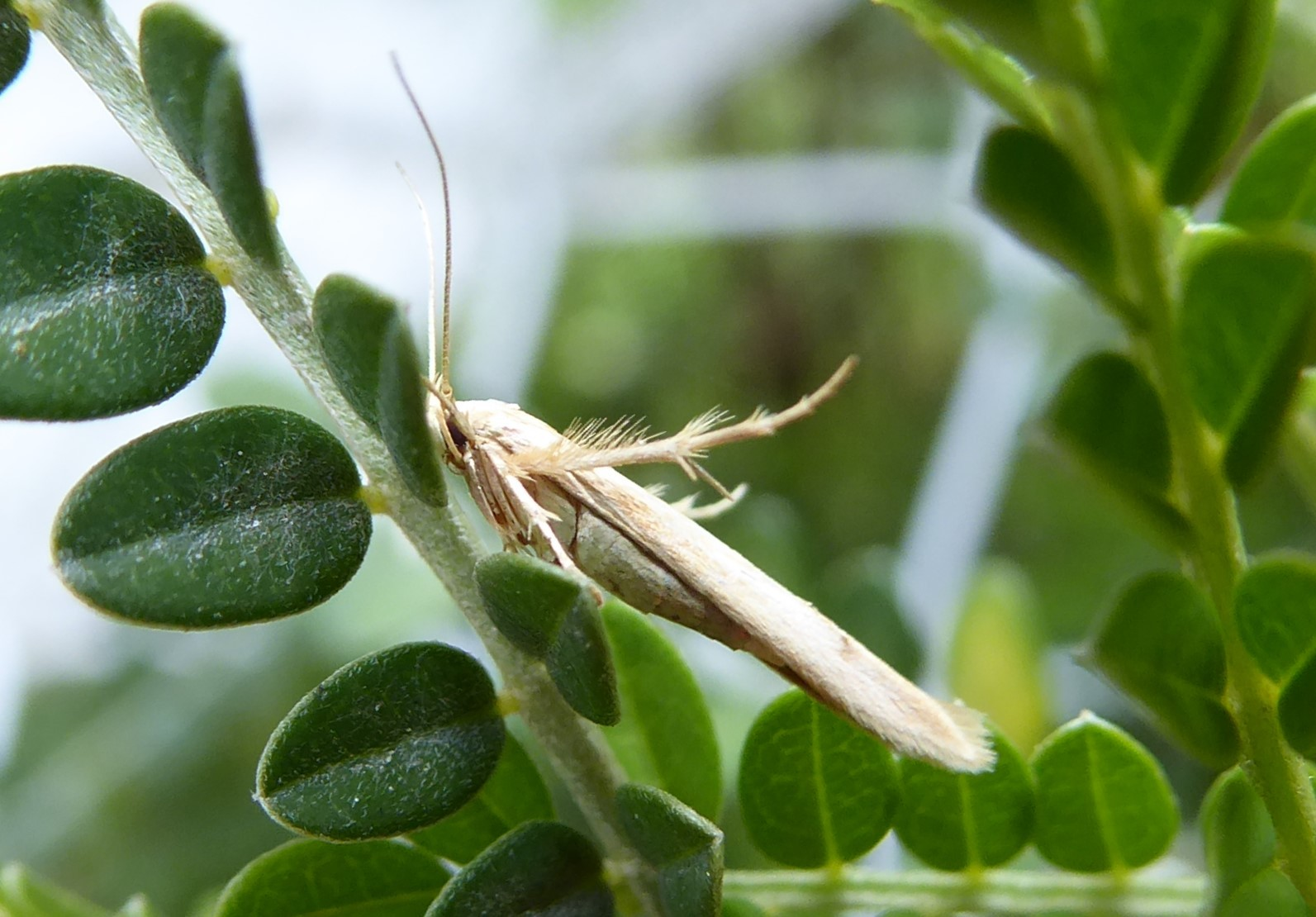

Scientific classification
- Kingdom: Animalia
- Phylum: Arthropoda
- Clade: Pancrustacea
- Class: Insecta
- Order: Lepidoptera
- Family: Stathmopodidae
- Genus: Stathmopoda
- Species: S. horticola

Binomial name
- Stathmopoda horticola Dugdale, 1988

= Stathmopoda horticola =

Species of moth endemic to New Zealand

Stathmopoda horticola, the orchard featherfoot, is a species of moth in the Stathmopodidae family. It was described by John S. Dugdale in 1988. It is endemic to New Zealand and is found in the North, South and Stewart Islands. This species inhabits native forests and adults are on the wing from September until April.

== Taxonomy ==
This species was first described by John S. Dugdale in 1988. This species was discussed and illustrated by George Hudson under the name Stathmopoda skelloni in his 1924 book The butterflies and moths of New Zealand. The female holotype specimen, collected by P. Brown in Tauranga, is held in the New Zealand Arthropod Collection.

== Description ==
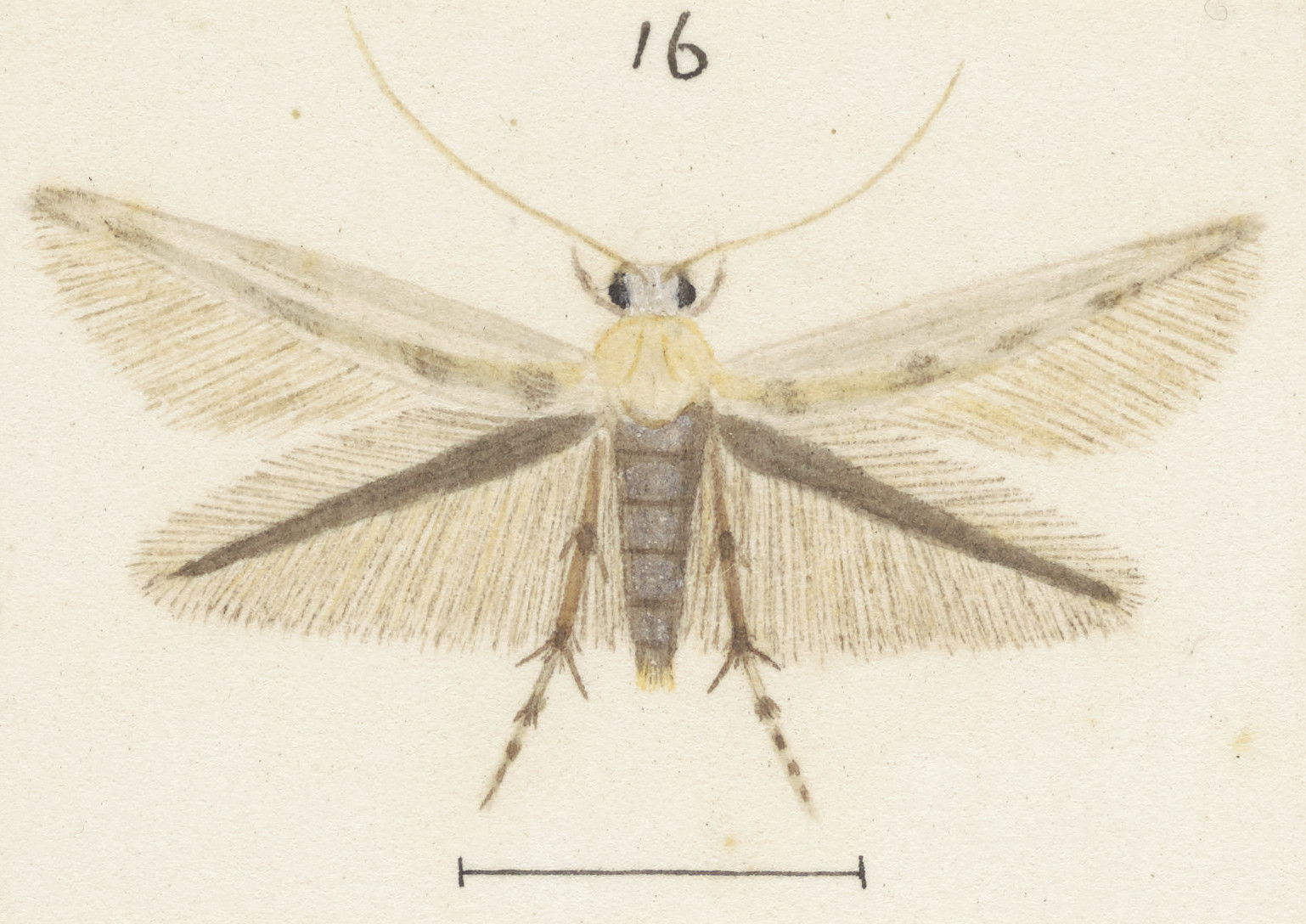
Illustration of S. horticola.

Dugdale stated that S. horticola differs from the similar Stathmopoda skelloni in both the male and female patterns of colour as well as the shape of genitalia of each sex. Hudson described S. horticola under the name S. skelloni as follows:

The expansion of the wings is slightly over 1/2 inch. The fore-wings are silvery-white with four cloudy elongate dusky grey marks on the termen and dorsum, and one or two very indistinct longitudinal streaks near the middle of the wing. The hind-wings are dark brownish-grey, and all the cilia pale brownish-grey. The dusky markings are variable and frequently almost obsolete.

This species has been confused with Stathmopoda caminora and Stathmopoda aposema.

== Distribution ==
This species is endemic to New Zealand. It has been observed in the North, South and Stewart Islands.

== Habitat ==
S. horticola inhabits native forest.

== Behaviour ==
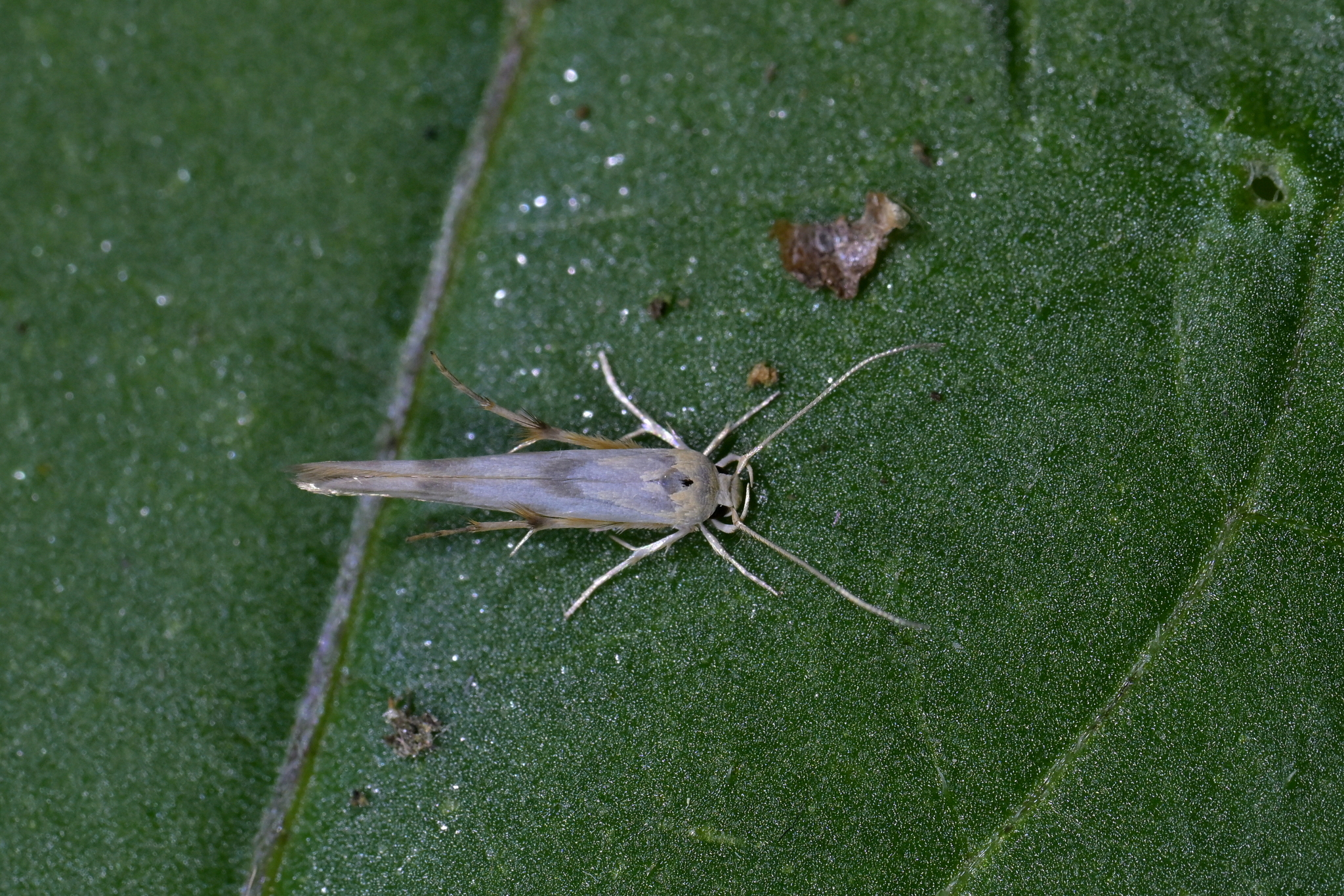
Resting posture.

Adults of this species are on the wing from September until April. The moth rests with closed wings which are slightly elevated posteriorly. The antennae are extended, slightly curved outwards and backwards. Both hind legs are usually elevated and pushed out sideways with the moth standing on the fore and middle leg pairs. The palpi are generally held with their tips almost in contact.
