= Stathmopoda aristodoxa =

- Living specimen

Conservation status
- Data Deficit (NZ TCS)

Scientific classification
- Kingdom: Animalia
- Phylum: Arthropoda
- Clade: Pancrustacea
- Class: Insecta
- Order: Lepidoptera
- Family: Stathmopodidae
- Genus: Stathmopoda
- Species: S. aristodoxa

Binomial name
- Stathmopoda aristodoxa Meyrick, 1926

Species of moth endemic to New Zealand

Stathmopoda aristodoxa is a species of moth in the family Stathmopodidae. It was first described by Edward Meyrick in 1926. This species is endemic to New Zealand and has been observed in the North Island. It inhabits native forest and the adults are on the wing in November. As at 2025, this species was classified as "Data Deficient" by the Department of Conservation.

== Taxonomy ==
This species was described by Edward Meyrick in 1926 using a specimen collected in Gollan's Valley, Wellington in November by George Hudson. Hudson discussed and illustrated the species in his 1928 book The Butterflies and Moths of New Zealand. He also adding to the recorded localities of this species in 1939. The male holotype specimen is held at the Natural History Museum, London.

Meyrick stated that this species was allied to S. caminora, a variable species. However Meyrick pointed out the series of specimens he used to describe S. aristodoxa had distinctive shining snow-white thorax and dorsal blotches, with the anterior blotch being broad and semi-circular, where as the similar blotch on the forewings of S. caminora is outwards-oblique and pointed.

In 2025 Robert Hoare hypothesised that this species may be an uncommon colour form of another species in the genus Stathmopoda. As at 2025 this moth is regarded as being taxonomically unresolved.

== Description ==
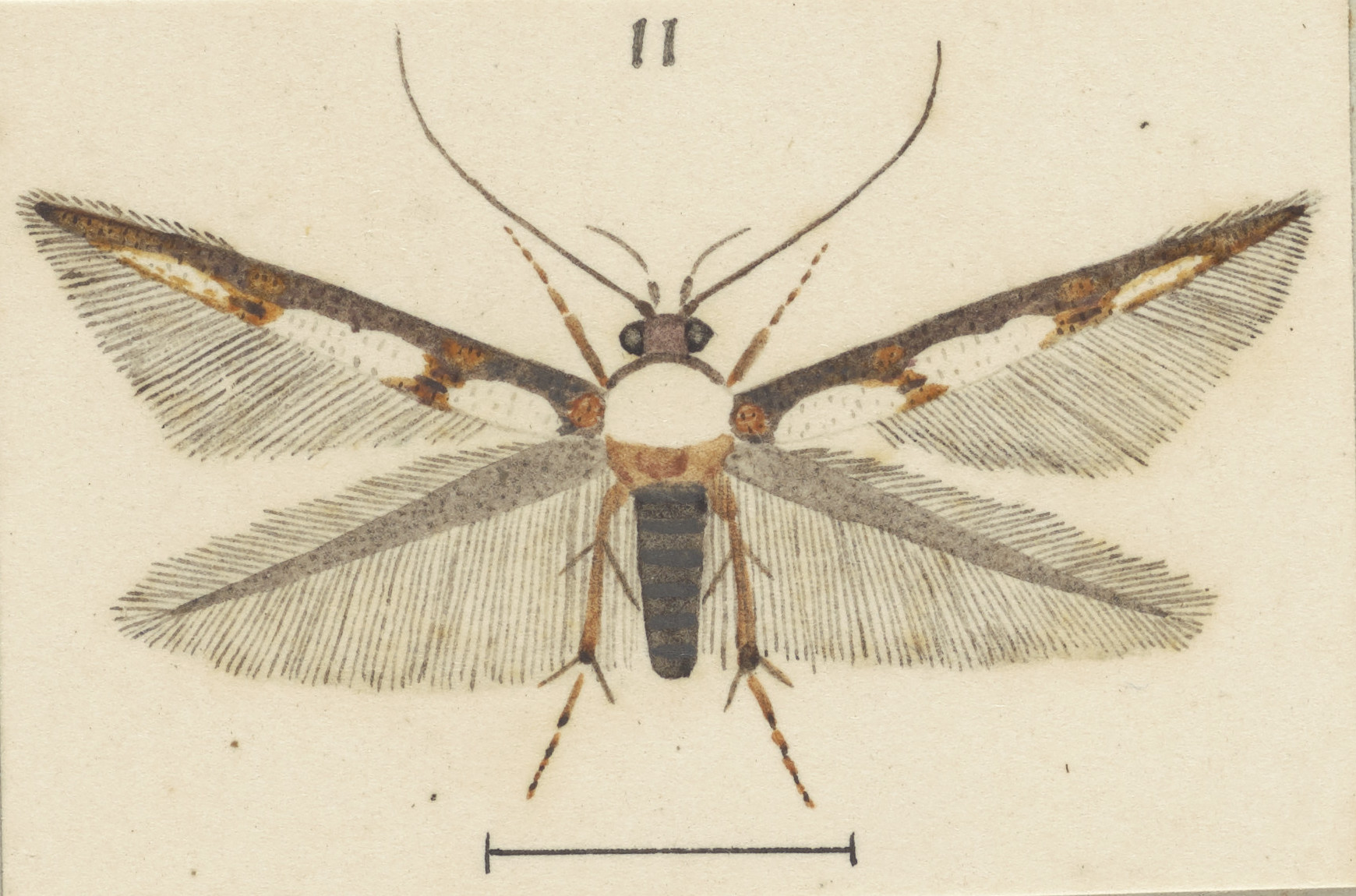
Illustration by Hudson.

Adult resting posture.

Meyrick described this species as follows:

♂. 13 mm. Head silvery-white, crown grey. Palpi white. Thorax shining white, shoulders dark grey, edged posteriorly with some ferruginous scales. Forewings narrowed from near base, acute; pale ochreous; costal edge suffused dark grey from base to 1/3, thence undefined broader violet-grey costal suffusion to 2/3; an oblique blotch of dark violet-grey suffusion from base of costa, whence a slender ferruginous-brown partially grey-suffused supramedian streak runs to just below apex, its apex enlarged into a wedge-shaped spot; two shining snow-white dorsal blotches reaching supramedian streak, first semicircular, second suboval, inwards-oblique, these preceded, separated, and followed by spots of orange-ferruginous suffusion somewhat marked irregularly dark grey; some orange-ferruginous suffusion along termen except at apex: cilia grey, on costa mixed pale ochreous. Hindwings rather dark grey; cilia grey.

== Distribution ==
S. aristodoxa is endemic to New Zealand. Other than the type locality, this species has been recorded at Pohangina and Auckland.

== Biology and life cycle ==
Adult moths of this species are on the wing in November.

== Habitat and host species ==
It inhabits native forest. As this moth belongs to the genus Stathmopoda, its larvae, like those of other species in the genus, may possibly feed on scale insects.

== Conservation status ==
In 2025 this species was classified under the New Zealand Threat Classification System as being "Data Deficient". Prior to this, in 2015, this species had been classified as having the "At Risk, Naturally Uncommon" classification.
