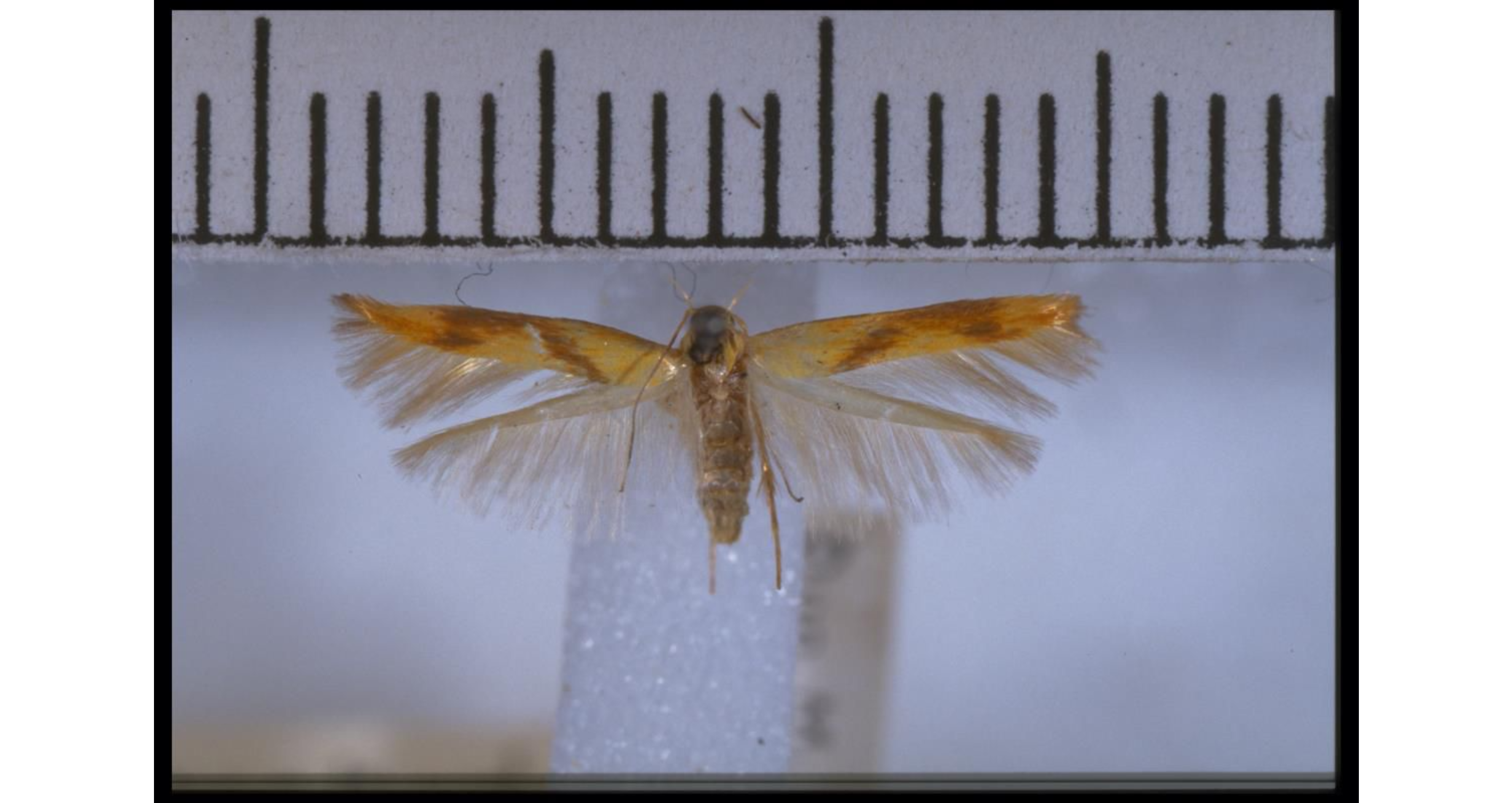
- Holotype specimen

Scientific classification
- Kingdom: Animalia
- Phylum: Arthropoda
- Clade: Pancrustacea
- Class: Insecta
- Order: Lepidoptera
- Family: Stathmopodidae
- Genus: Stathmopoda
- Species: S. distincta

Binomial name
- Stathmopoda distincta Philpott, 1923

= Stathmopoda distincta =

Species of moth endemic to New Zealand

Stathmopoda distincta is a moth of the family Stathmopodidae. It was first described by Alfred Philpott in 1923. It is endemic to New Zealand and has been observed in the South Island. This species inhabits native forest up to altitudes of 3,000 feet (910 m). Adults are on the wing in December and January.

== Taxonomy ==
Illustration of female by Hudson.

This moth was first described by Alfred Philpott in 1928 using specimens collected by him on Dun Mountain. George Hudson discussed and illustrated this species in his 1928 book The butterflies and moths of New Zealand. The female holotype specimen is held at the New Zealand Arthropod Collection.

== Description ==
Philpott described this species as follows:

♂♀ 13–15 mm. Head, palpi, and thorax yellowish-white, darker in female. Antennae ochreous, infuscated on apical half. Abdomen ochreous-grey. Legs whitish-ochreous. Forewings elongate, narrow, costa almost straight, apex acute, termen extremely oblique; yellow; a thick reddish-brown outwardly-oblique bar from dorsum at ⅓, not quite reaching costa; a similar suffused bar from costa at ⅔ to dorsum; in some examples the area surrounding bars is much irrorated with reddish-brown: cilia pale fuscous tinted with ochreous round apex. Hindwings fuscous-grey: cilia slightly paler.

Philpott pointed out that this species is similar in appearance to S. caminora.

== Distribution ==
This species is endemic to New Zealand. It is found in the South Island and has been observed at its type locality as well as at Otira. Philpott regarded this moth as being "not common".

== Habitat ==
S. distincta inhabits native forest up to altitudes of 3,000 feet (910 m).

== Behaviour ==
Adults are on the wing in December and January.
