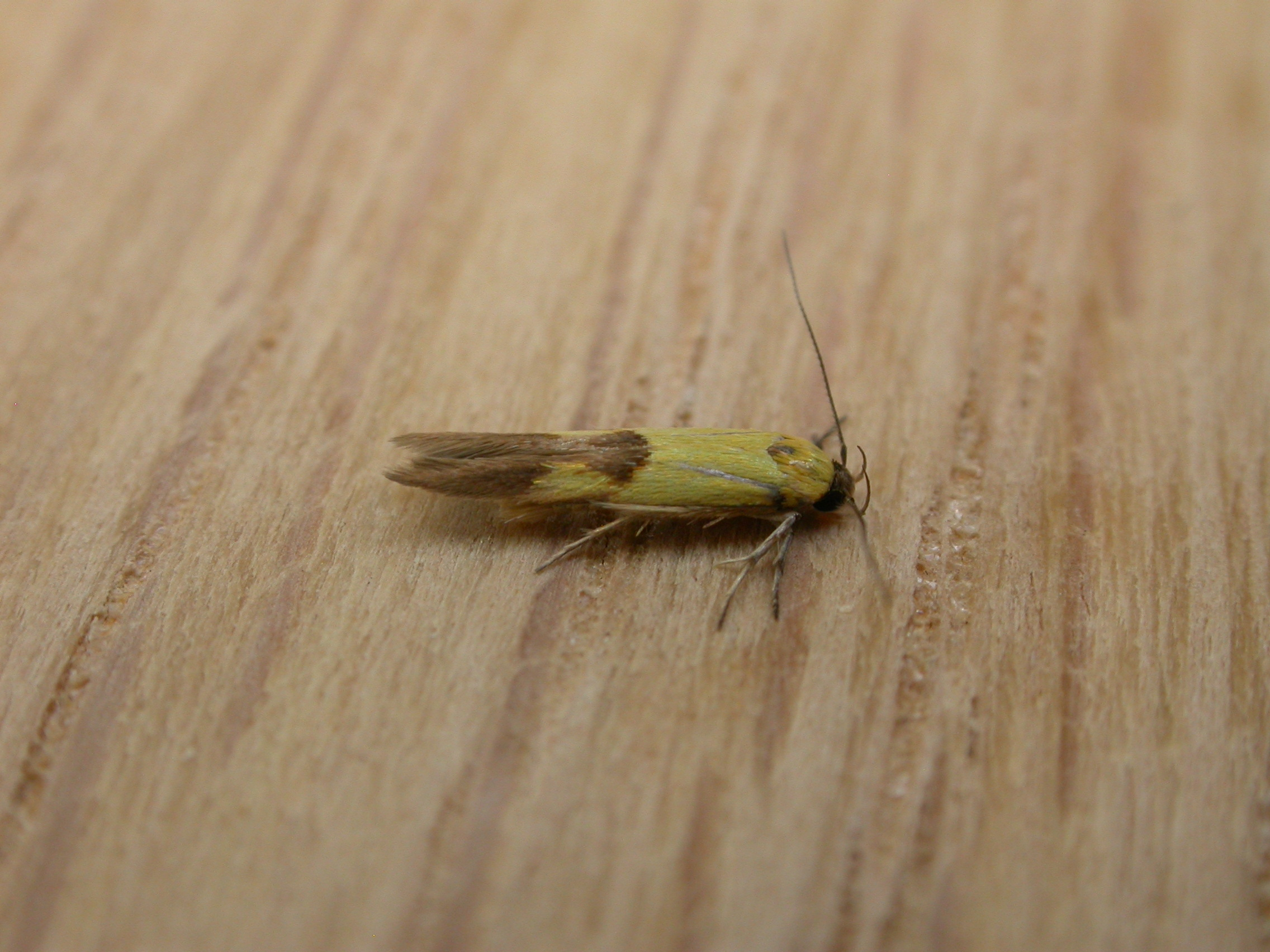

Scientific classification
- Domain: Eukaryota
- Kingdom: Animalia
- Phylum: Arthropoda
- Class: Insecta
- Order: Lepidoptera
- Family: Stathmopodidae
- Genus: Stathmopoda
- Species: S. crocophanes

Binomial name
- Stathmopoda crocophanes Meyrick, 1897

= Stathmopoda crocophanes =

Species of moth

Stathmopoda crocophanes is a moth of the Stathmopodidae family. It is found in Australia in the states of New South Wales, Queensland, South Australia, Tasmania and Western Australia.

The wingspan is about 0.4 in (10 mm).

The larvae live in dead leaf litter. They feed on dead leaf litter from various plants, including Eucalyptus species.

== Taxonomy ==
Some authors treat it as a synonym of Stathmopoda auriferella.
