= Stathmopoda biclavis =

Scientific classification
- Kingdom: Animalia
- Phylum: Arthropoda
- Class: Insecta
- Order: Lepidoptera
- Family: Stathmopodidae
- Genus: Stathmopoda
- Species: S. biclavis

Binomial name
- Stathmopoda biclavis Meyrick, 1911

Species of moth

Stathmopoda biclavis is a species of moth in the Stathmopodidae family. It is found in the Seychelles on Aldabra island in the Indian Ocean.

This species is close to Stathmopoda auriferella.
