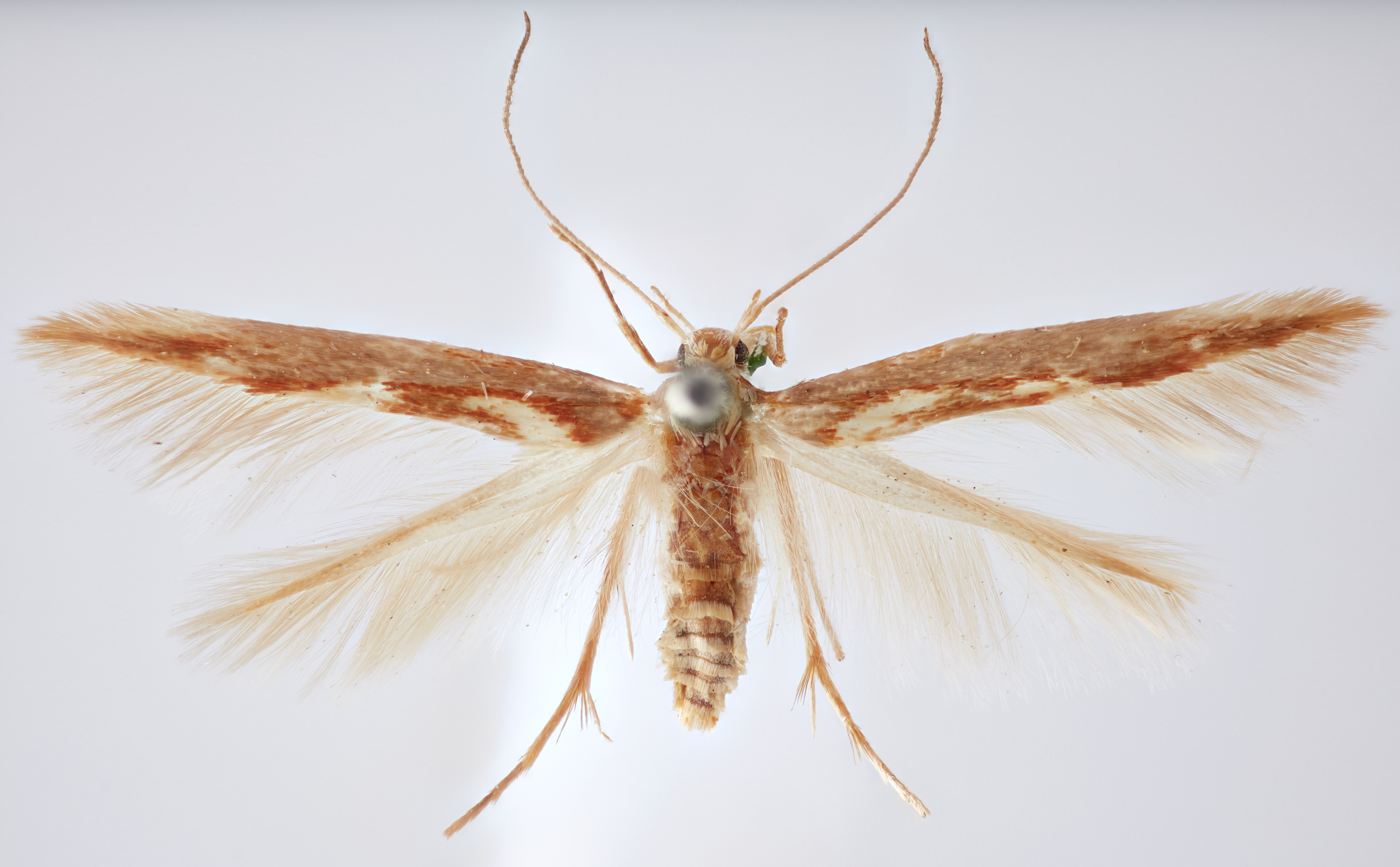
- S. campylocha specimen at the Auckland War Memorial Museum

Conservation status
- Nationally Critical (NZ TCS)

Scientific classification
- Kingdom: Animalia
- Phylum: Arthropoda
- Clade: Pancrustacea
- Class: Insecta
- Order: Lepidoptera
- Family: Stathmopodidae
- Genus: Stathmopoda
- Species: S. campylocha

Binomial name
- Stathmopoda campylocha Meyrick, 1889

= Stathmopoda campylocha =

Species of moth endemic to New Zealand

Stathmopoda campylocha is a species of moth in the family Stathmopodidae. It is endemic to New Zealand. It is classified as critically endangered by the Department of Conservation.

== Taxonomy ==
This species was first described by Edward Meyrick in 1889 using specimens collected in Wellington and Dunedin in January. The female lectotype, collected in Dunedin, is held at the Natural History Museum, London.

== Description ==
Meyrick described the species as follows:

12-14mm. Head and thorax whitish-ochreous, somewhat metallic-shining. Palpi and antennae pale whitish-ochreous. Abdomen grey. Legs whitish-ochreous, greyish-tinged, anterior pair dark grey, posterior tibiae with dark-grey scales at origin of spurs. Forewings elongate, very narrow, broadest near base, long-pointed; whitish-ochreous; an ochreous-fuscous or dark fuscous streak along costa from base to 3/4, sometimes almost obsolete; an ochreous-fuscous or dark fuscous broadly V-shaped mark before middle, more or less suffused, variable in thickness, its angle resting on inner margin, extremities nearly reaching costa; a longitudinal line in posterior half of disc, a spot at apex, and an elongate spot at anal angle ochreous-fuscous or ochreous, sometimes partially connected : cilia grey. Hindwings rather dark grey; cilia grey.

== Distribution ==
This species is endemic to New Zealand. It has been observed in both the North and South Island. Historically this species occurred at Wellington and Dunedin, and in 1915 Charles E. Clarke collected a specimen in mid December at Silverstream, Upper Hutt. A further specimen was collected in early February in 1932 in the Pohangina Forest Reserve and was used by George Vernon Hudson to create an illustration of the species. In more recent times S. campylocha has been found to be present in western and eastern Otago including in the Matukituki Valley.

== Ecology and habitat ==
Meyrick collected his specimens amongst forest and Hudson concurred that the species frequents forest habitat.

== Host species ==
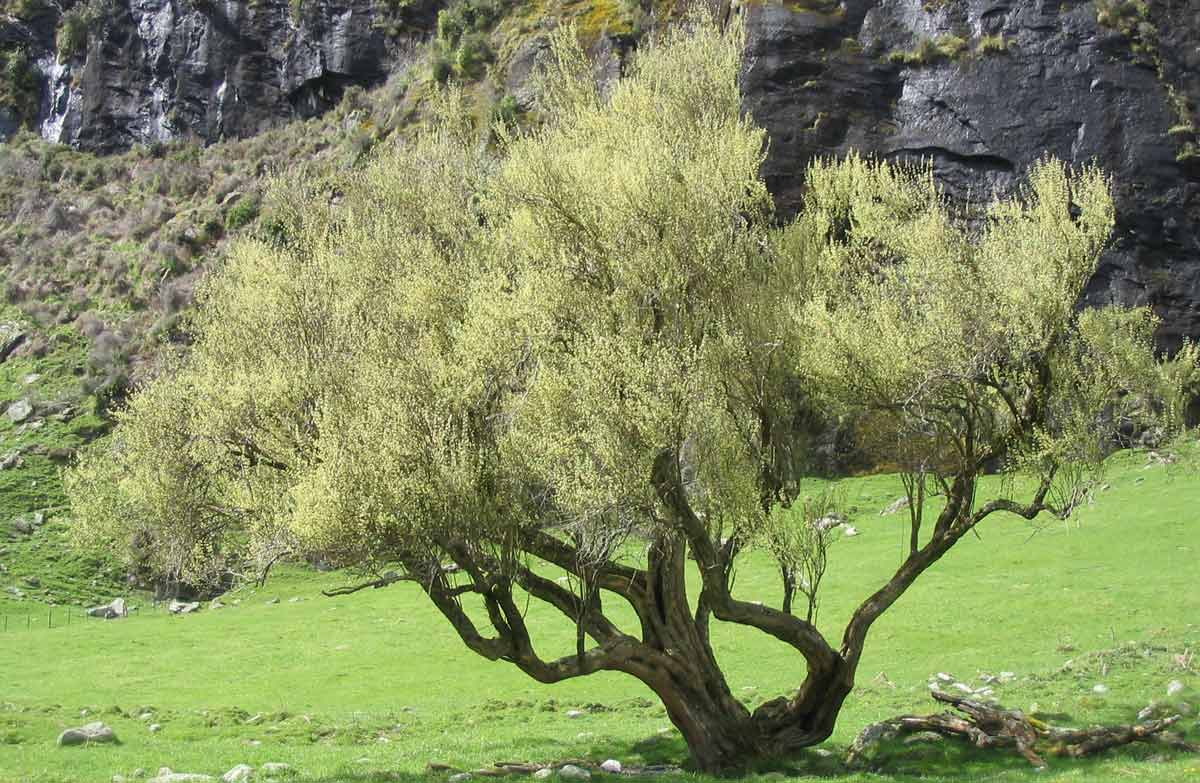
Olearia hectorii

In 2000 Brian H. Patrick discovered that S. campylocha is associated with the nationally endangered plant Olearia hectorii. Patrick was unable to locate S. campylocha larvae feeding but he hypothesised that they are likely detritivores or alternatively that they feed on scale insects. He also suggested other possible host plants might be Olearia fimbriata, Olearia lineata, Olearia bullata or Olearia fragrantissima. Adults have also been observed on Olearia virgata.

== Conservation status ==
In 1939 Hudson stated that S. campylocha was regarded as being extremely rare. This species has been given the "Nationally Critical" conservation status under the New Zealand Threat Classification System.
