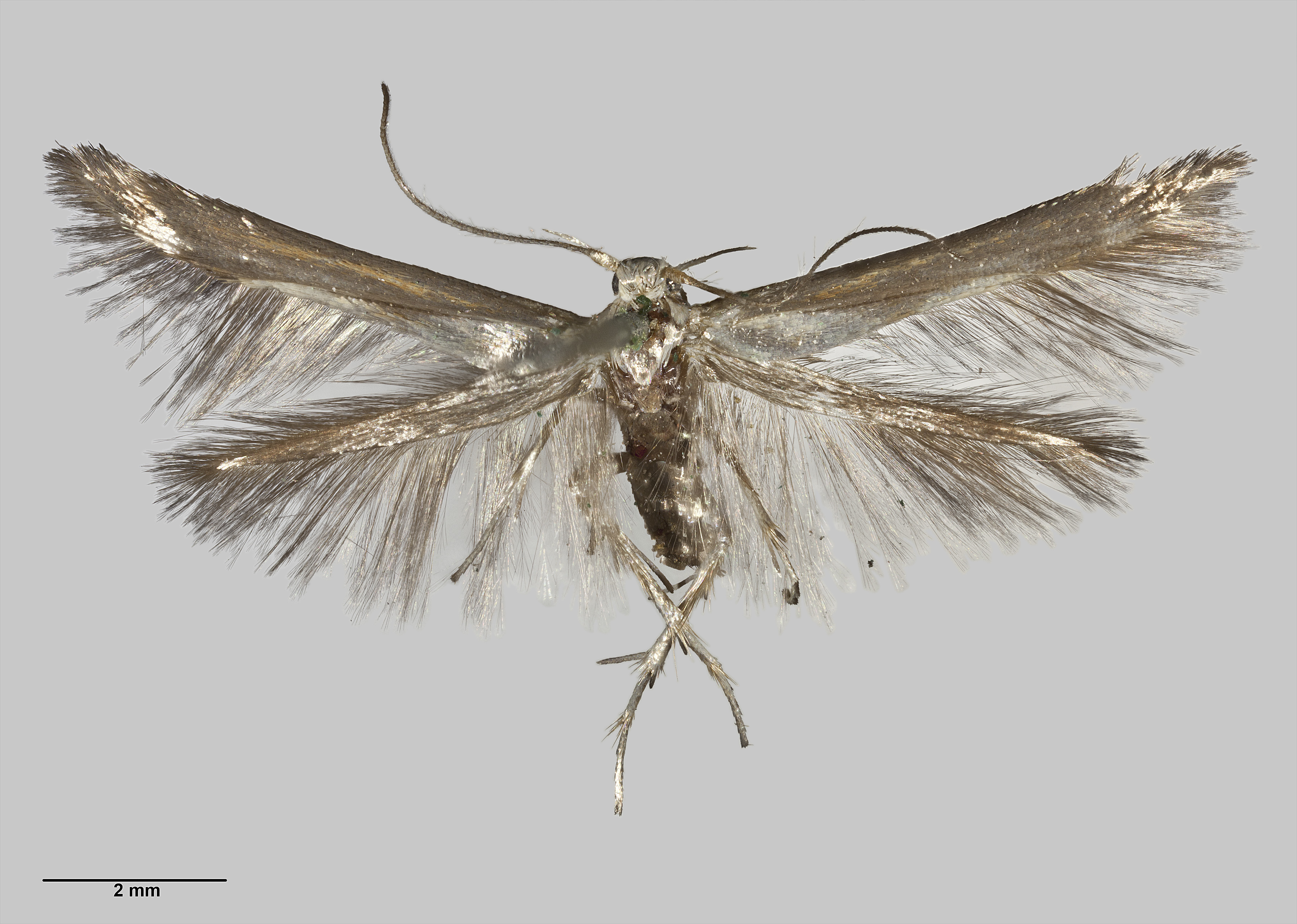

Scientific classification
- Kingdom: Animalia
- Phylum: Arthropoda
- Class: Insecta
- Order: Lepidoptera
- Family: Stathmopodidae
- Genus: Stathmopoda
- Species: S. mysteriastis

Binomial name
- Stathmopoda mysteriastis Meyrick, 1901

= Stathmopoda mysteriastis =

Species of moth

Stathmopoda mysteriastis is a moth of the family Stathmopodidae. It was described by Edward Meyrick in 1901. It is found in New Zealand.
