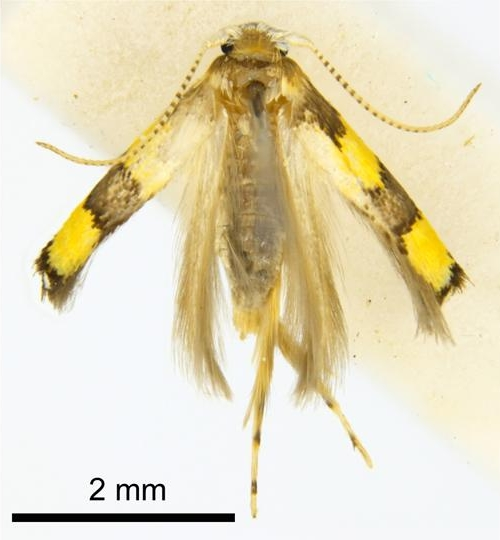

Scientific classification
- Kingdom: Animalia
- Phylum: Arthropoda
- Class: Insecta
- Order: Lepidoptera
- Family: Stathmopodidae
- Genus: Stathmopoda
- Species: S. trichrysa

Binomial name
- Stathmopoda trichrysa (Meyrick, 1920)

Synonyms
- Ulochora trichrysa Meyrick, 1920

= Stathmopoda trichrysa =

Species of moth

Stathmopoda trichrysa is a species of moth in the Stathmopodidae family. It is found on Fiji.

This larvae feed in the dry pods of Bauhinia monandra and Caesalpinia pidcherrima.
