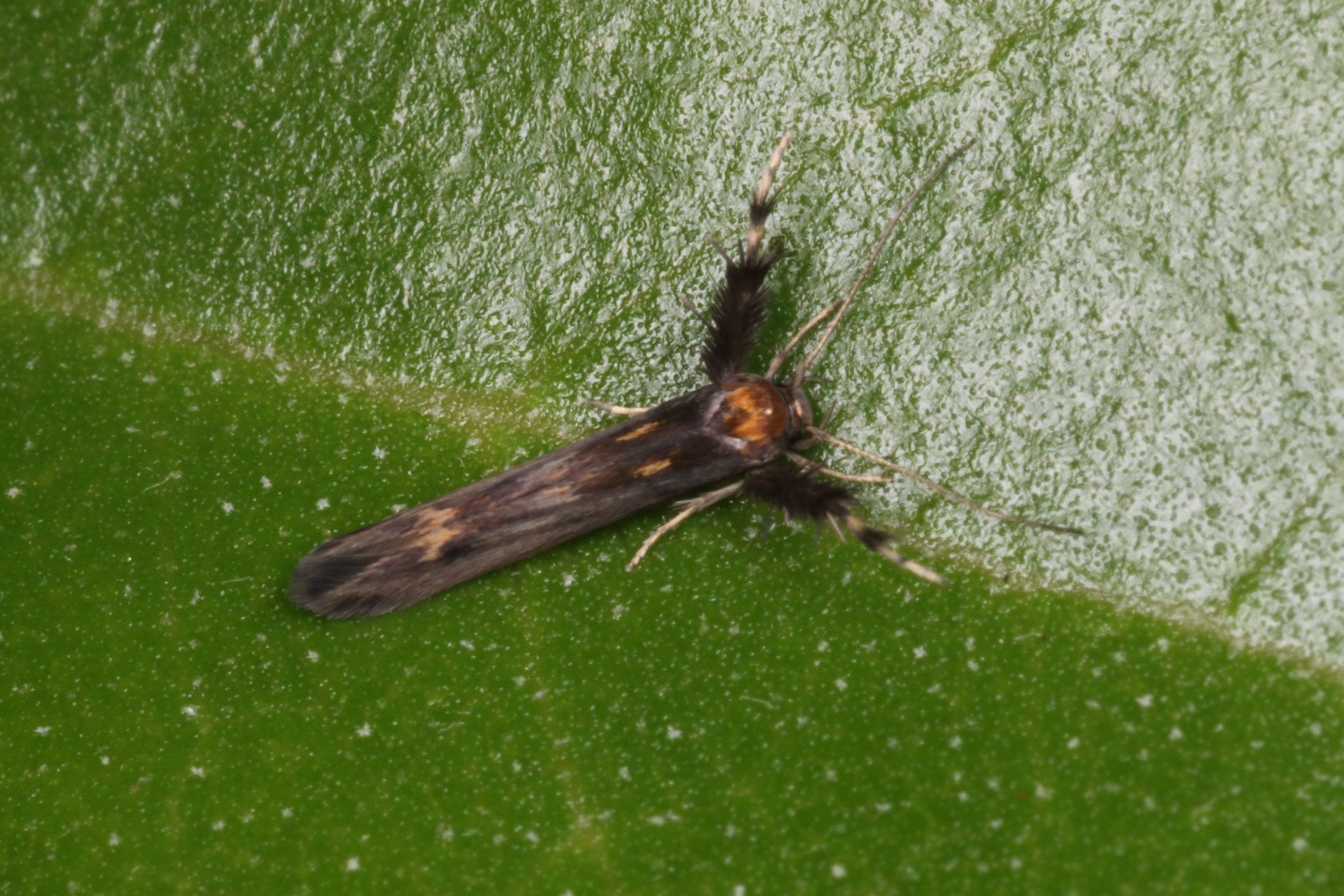

Scientific classification
- Kingdom: Animalia
- Phylum: Arthropoda
- Class: Insecta
- Order: Lepidoptera
- Family: Stathmopodidae
- Genus: Stathmopoda
- Species: S. coracodes

Binomial name
- Stathmopoda coracodes Meyrick, 1923

= Stathmopoda coracodes =

Species of moth

Stathmopoda coracodes is a moth of the family Stathmopodidae. It was described by Edward Meyrick in 1923. It is found in New Zealand.

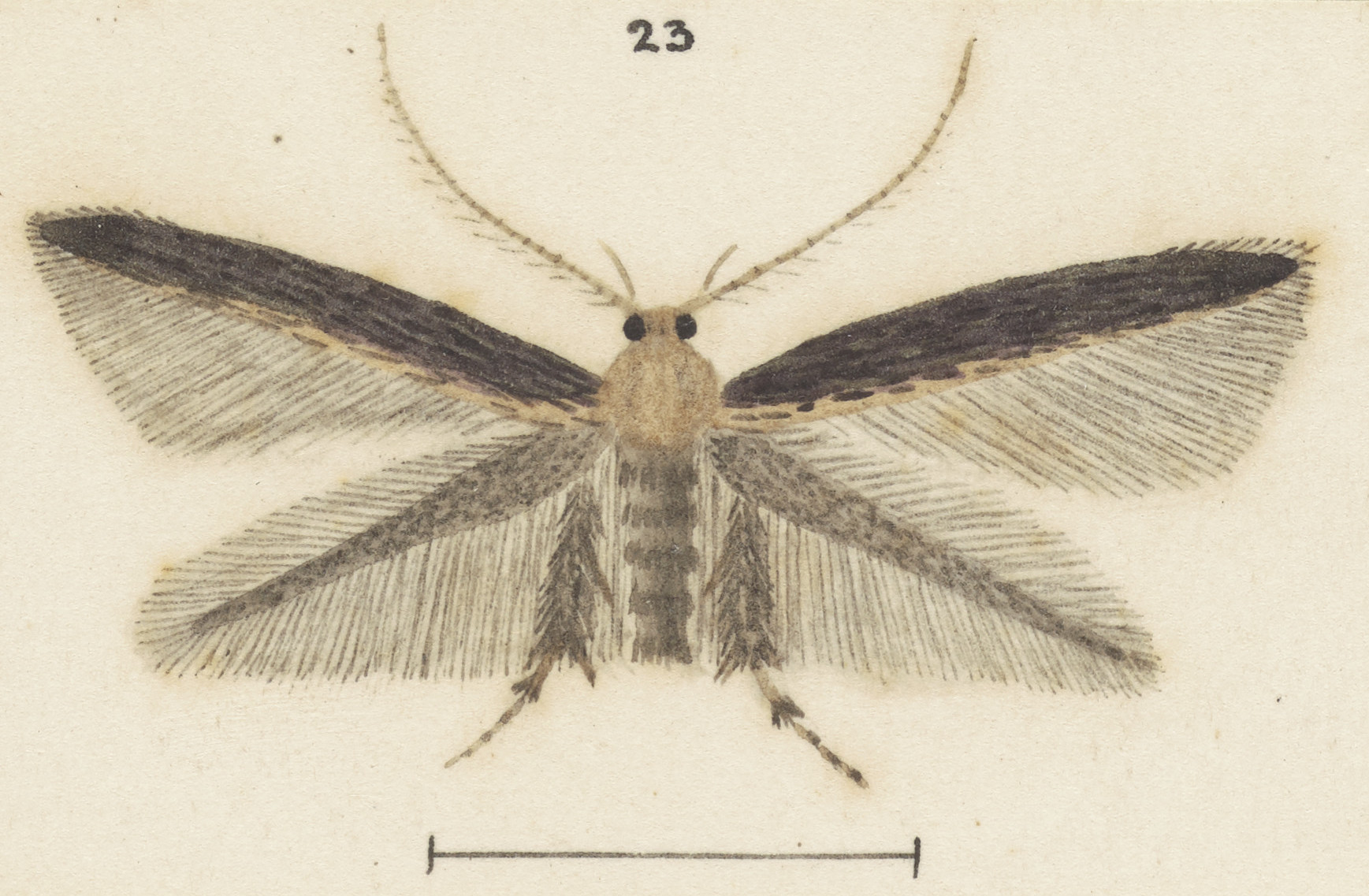
S. coracodes illustrated by George Hudson.
