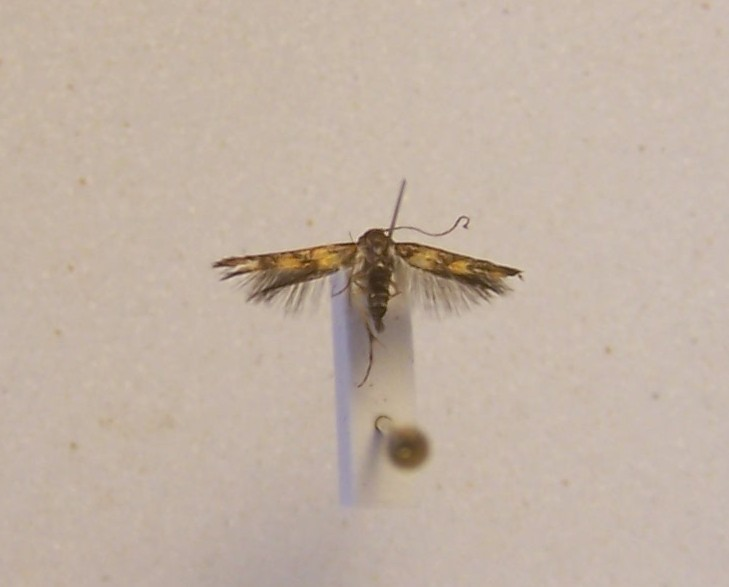

Scientific classification
- Kingdom: Animalia
- Phylum: Arthropoda
- Class: Insecta
- Order: Lepidoptera
- Family: Stathmopodidae
- Genus: Stathmopoda
- Species: S. trimolybdias

Binomial name
- Stathmopoda trimolybdias Meyrick, 1926

= Stathmopoda trimolybdias =

Species of moth endemic to New Zealand

Stathmopoda distincta is a moth of the family Stathmopodidae. It was described by Edward Meyrick in 1926. It is endemic to New Zealand.
