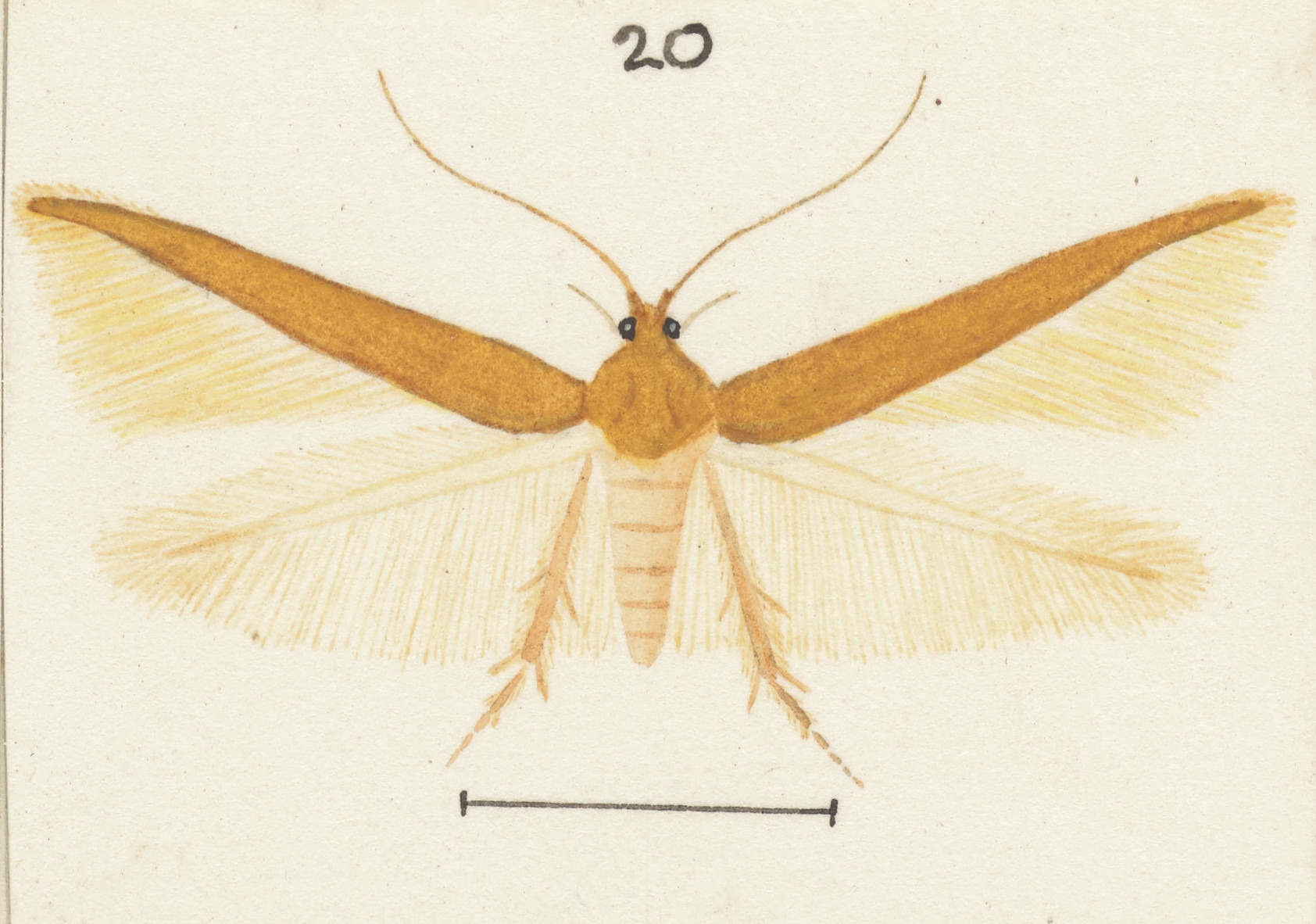
- Illustration of female

Scientific classification
- Kingdom: Animalia
- Phylum: Arthropoda
- Class: Insecta
- Order: Lepidoptera
- Family: Stathmopodidae
- Genus: Stathmopoda
- Species: S. holochra

Binomial name
- Stathmopoda holochra Meyrick, 1889

= Stathmopoda holochra =

Species of moth

Stathmopoda holochra is a moth of the family Stathmopodidae. It was described by Edward Meyrick in 1889 using specimens first collected at the Wellington Botanic Garden. It is endemic to New Zealand. The larvae of this species feed on Phormium seed heads.

== Description ==
♀. 14mm. Head, palpi, antennas, and abdomen pale whitish-ochreous. Thorax whitish-ochreous, slightly reddish-tinged. Legs pale whitish-ochreous. Forewings elongate, very narrow, broadest near base, long-pointed; pale reddish-ochreous, unicolorous : cilia pale whitish-ochreous-gi'ey. Hind-wings pale whitish-grey, posteriorly ochreous-tinged; cilia pale whitish-ochreous-grey.
