= Stathmopoda hexatyla =

Scientific classification
- Kingdom: Animalia
- Phylum: Arthropoda
- Class: Insecta
- Order: Lepidoptera
- Family: Stathmopodidae
- Genus: Stathmopoda
- Species: S. hexatyla

Binomial name
- Stathmopoda hexatyla Meyrick, 1907

Species of moth

Stathmopoda hexatyla is a moth of the family Stathmopodidae first described by Edward Meyrick in 1907. It is found in Sri Lanka.
