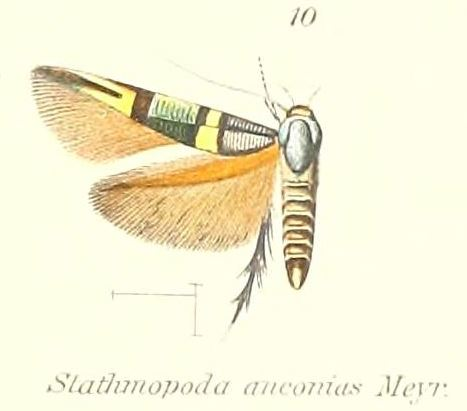

Scientific classification
- Kingdom: Animalia
- Phylum: Arthropoda
- Class: Insecta
- Order: Lepidoptera
- Family: Stathmopodidae
- Genus: Stathmopoda
- Species: S. aconias

Binomial name
- Stathmopoda aconias Meyrick, 1910

= Stathmopoda aconias =

Species of moth

Stathmopoda aconias is a species of moth of the family Stathmopodidae. It is found in India and Sri Lanka.
