= Stathmopoda calyptraea =

Scientific classification
- Kingdom: Animalia
- Phylum: Arthropoda
- Class: Insecta
- Order: Lepidoptera
- Family: Stathmopodidae
- Genus: Stathmopoda
- Species: S. calyptraea

Binomial name
- Stathmopoda calyptraea Meyrick, 1908

Species of moth

Stathmopoda calyptraea is a species of moth of the family Stathmopodidae. It is found in Myanmar.

This species has a wingspan of about 10 mm. The forewings are dark fuscous with a white basal patch occupying two-fifths of the wing, its outer edge inwardly oblique from the costa. There is some undefined whitish suffusion about two-thirds and before the apex. The hindwings are fuscous.
