= Stathmopoda masinissa =

Persimmon fruit moth

Scientific classification
- Kingdom: Animalia
- Phylum: Arthropoda
- Class: Insecta
- Order: Lepidoptera
- Family: Stathmopodidae
- Genus: Stathmopoda
- Species: S. masinissa

Binomial name
- Stathmopoda masinissa Meyrick, 1906

Synonyms
- Stathmopoda albidorsis Meyrick, 1931; Kakivoria flavofasciata Nagano, 1916

Species of moth

Stathmopoda masinissa, the persimmon fruit moth, is a moth of the family Stathmopodidae. The species was first described by Edward Meyrick in 1906. It is a serious pest on several persimmon species. It is found in several Old World countries Japan, Korea, Australia, Sri Lanka, Thailand and China.

== Description ==
The caterpillars are internal borers which enter the fruit through the stalk or calyx. Host plants of the adults and caterpillars include several persimmon species such as Diospyros kaki, and also Amaranthus species.
