= Stathmopoda cephalaea =

Scientific classification
- Kingdom: Animalia
- Phylum: Arthropoda
- Clade: Pancrustacea
- Class: Insecta
- Order: Lepidoptera
- Family: Stathmopodidae
- Genus: Stathmopoda
- Species: S. cephalaea

Binomial name
- Stathmopoda cephalaea Meyrick, 1897

Species of moth

Stathmopoda cephalaea is a moth of the family Stathmopodidae. It was described by Edward Meyrick in 1897. It is found in Australia and has been recorded in New Zealand.

== Gallery ==
Live insect at rest

Specimen showing hindwings
