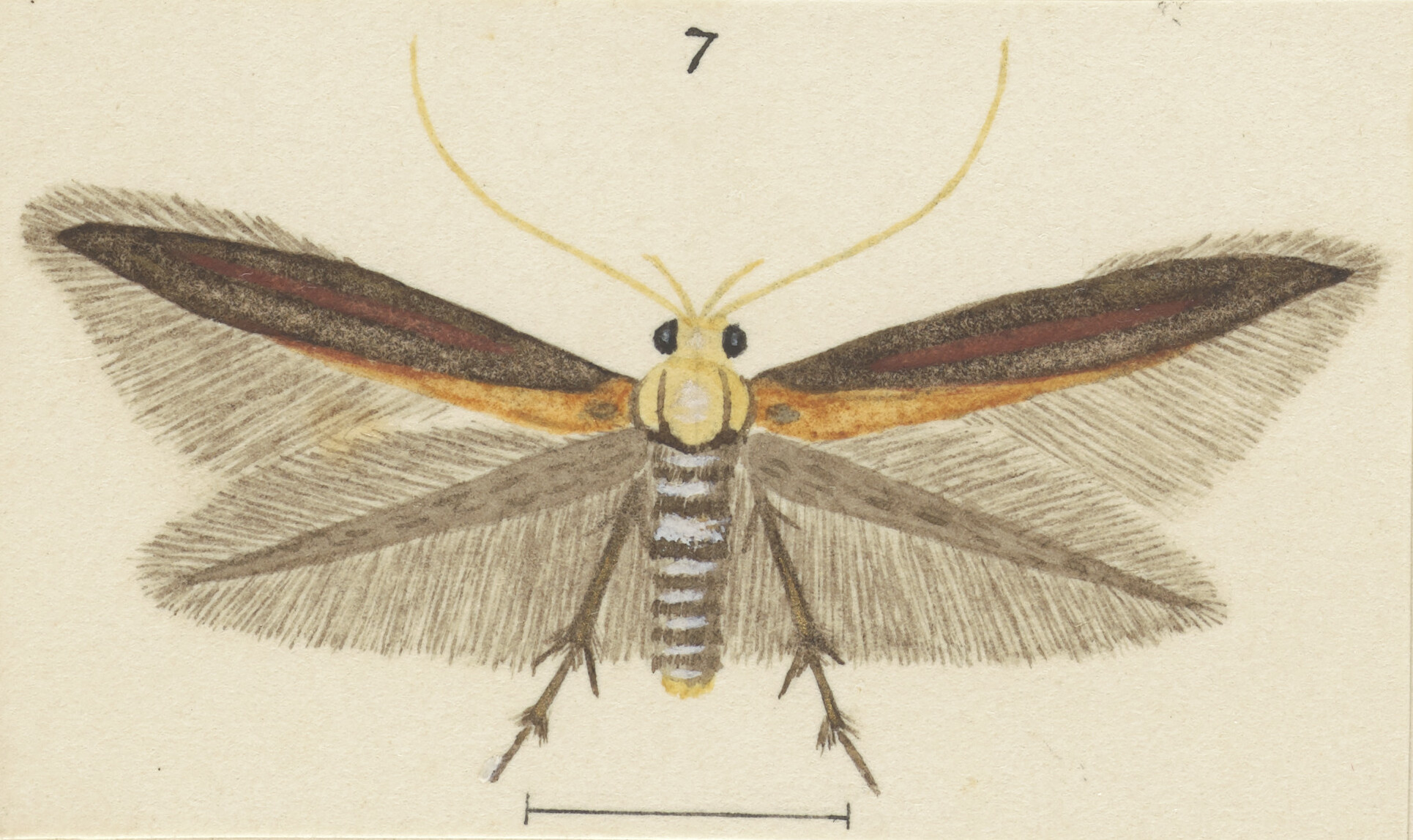
- Illustration of female

Conservation status
- Data Deficit (NZ TCS)

Scientific classification
- Kingdom: Animalia
- Phylum: Arthropoda
- Clade: Pancrustacea
- Class: Insecta
- Order: Lepidoptera
- Family: Stathmopodidae
- Genus: Stathmopoda
- Species: S. endotherma

Binomial name
- Stathmopoda endotherma Meyrick, 1931

= Stathmopoda endotherma =

Species of moth endemic to New Zealand

Stathmopoda endotherma is a species of moth in the family Stathmopodidae. This species was first described by Edward Meyrick in 1931. It is endemic to New Zealand and has been observed in the South Island. In 2025 this species was classified as "data deficient" under the New Zealand Threat Classification System.

== Taxonomy ==
This species was described by Edward Meyrick in 1931 using a specimen collected by Stewart Lindsay at Little River, Banks Peninsula in January. George Hudson discussed and illustrated the species in his 1939 book A supplement to the butterflies and moths of New Zealand. The holotype specimen is held at the Canterbury Museum.

== Description ==
Meyrick described the species as follows:

♀︎. 13-14mm. Head, palpi brassy-whitish-ochreous. Thorax pale brassy-orange-ochreous. Forewings rather narrow, long-pointed; bronze-grey; an orange basal mark from costa to fold; dorsal area as far as fold orange mixed ferruginous, slightly tinged grey near base; an obscure suffused ferruginous supramedian streak from 1/5 to beyond middle; cilia light bronzy-grey. Hindwings grey; cilia light grey.

== Distribution ==
This species is endemic to New Zealand and can be found in the South Island. As well as the type locality, this species has also been collected at Akaroa, Riccarton Bush, Prices Valley at Banks Peninsula, Klondyke Corner at Arthurs Pass National Park, McQuilkans Creek at Swampy Summit near Dunedin, and Dunsdale Scenic Reserve in Southland.

== Biology and life cycle ==
Adults are on the wing between late October and January.

== Habitat and host species ==
The preferred habitat of this species is indigenous forest. As this moth belongs to the genus Stathmopoda its larvae, like those of other species in the genus, may possibly feed on scale insects.

== Conservation status ==
In 2025 this species was classified by the New Zealand Department of Conservation as "data deficient" under the New Zealand Threat Classification System.
