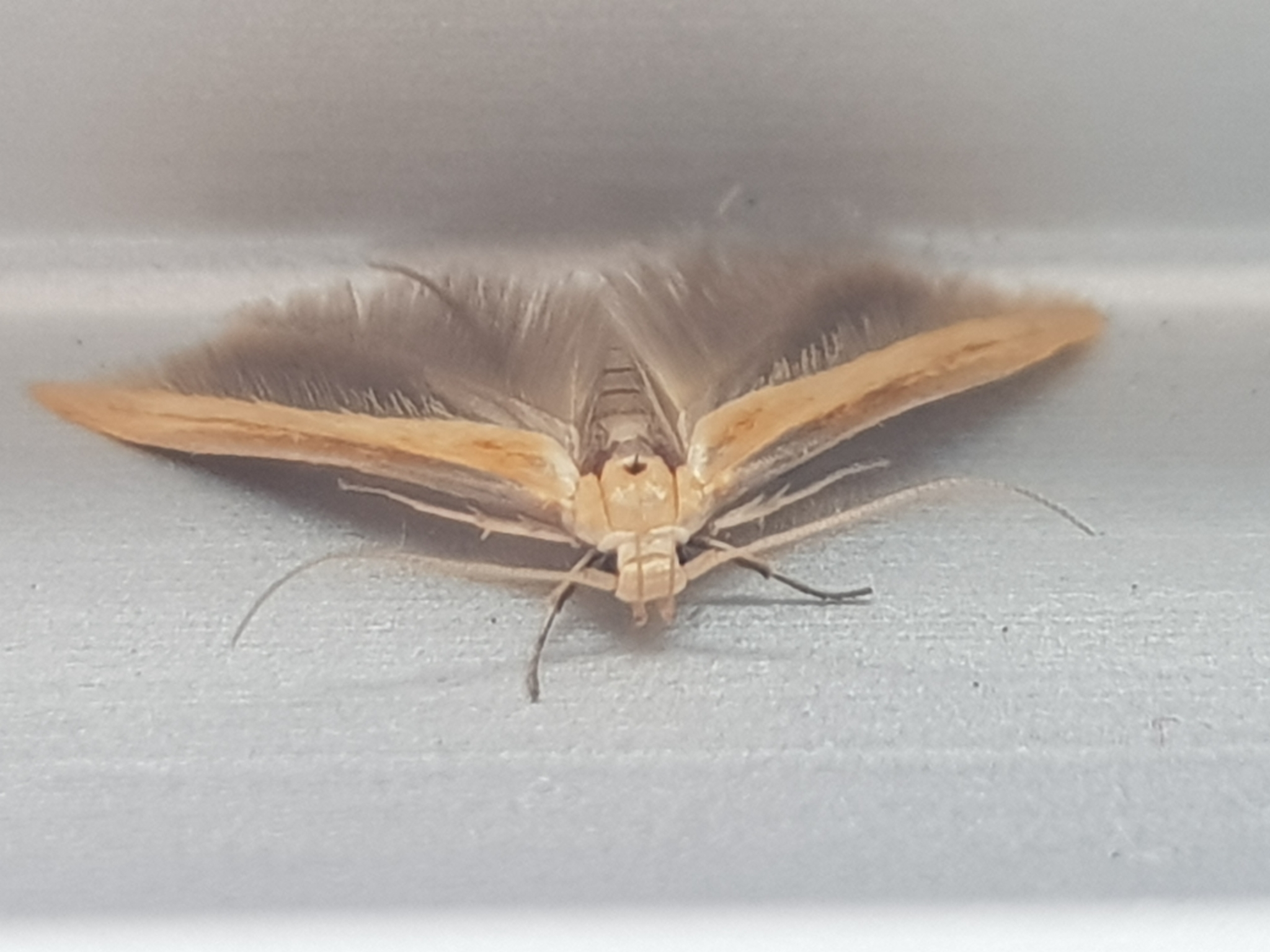

Scientific classification
- Kingdom: Animalia
- Phylum: Arthropoda
- Clade: Pancrustacea
- Class: Insecta
- Order: Lepidoptera
- Family: Stathmopodidae
- Genus: Stathmopoda
- Species: S. skelloni

Binomial name
- Stathmopoda skelloni (Butler, 1880)

Synonyms
- Boocara skelloni Butler, 1880; Stathmopoda fusilis Meyrick, 1914; Stathmopoda phlegyra Meyrick, 1889

= Stathmopoda skelloni =

Species of moth endemic to New Zealand

Stathmopoda skelloni, the yellow featherfoot, is a species of moth in the Stathmopodidae family. It is endemic to New Zealand and can be found throughout the country. This species inhabits native forest, coastal dunes and shrubland as well as cultivated gardens and orchards. The larvae of this species feed on a variety of plant species including agricultural crops such as kiwifruit and persimmons. This species is therefore regarded as an agricultural pest. Larvae have been observed as being parasitised by the fly species Trigonospila brevifacies.

The adult moths are on the wing from September until March and are nocturnal but are attracted to light. It has been hypothesised that constant ambient temperatures above 22°C during the larval stage of development renders adult moths of this species infertile.

== Taxonomy ==
This species was first described by Arthur Gardiner Butler in 1880 and named Boocara skelloni. Butler named this species in honour of William Skellon who had sent various specimens he had collected in Blenheim to Butler. In 1889 Edward Meyrick placed this species within the genus Stathmopoda. In 1921 Meyrick synonymised Stathmopoda fusilis with Stathmopoda phlegyra, which in turn was synonymsied by J. S. Dugdale in 1988 with this species. The female holotype specimen, collected in Blenheim, is held at the Natural History Museum, London.

The name skelloni was previously incorrectly used for S. horticola, a similar looking species which can be distinguished by the more extensive markings on the forewing of that species.

The common name for this species is the yellow featherfoot.

== Description ==
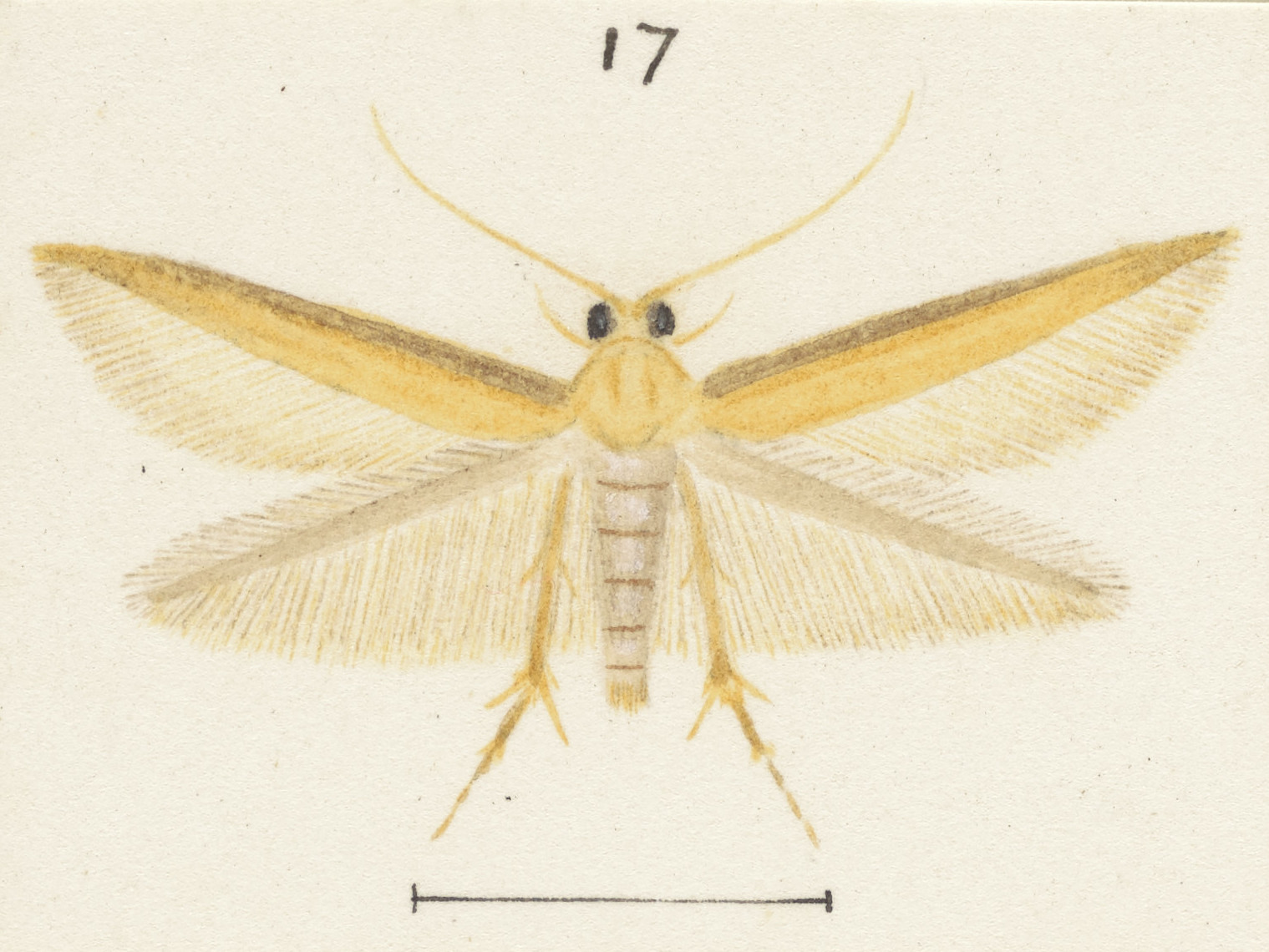
Illustration by Hudson.

Meyrick described this species as follows:

♂♀︎. 12-15mm. Head, palpi, and antennae pale whitish-ochreous. Thorax whitish-ochreous. Abdomen pale whitish-ochreous, greyish-tinged. Legs pale whitish-ochreous, anterior pair infuscated, apex of posterior tibiae grey. Forewings elongate, very narrow broadest near base, long-pointed; whitish-ochreous, sometimes yellowish-tinged; markings grey, very variable, sometimes partially margined by an ochreous suffusion; normally an elongate spot on inner margin at 1/3, a second beneath costa in middle, a third in disc at 2/3, a fourth before apex, and a slender subcostal line from second spot to costa near apex, but these tend to be variously connected and confused; sometimes a streak along fold, or along anterior part of costa; rarely a dark ochreous-fuscous suffusion towards base of inner margin : cilia light grey, sometimes ochreous-tinged. Hindwings and cilia light grey.

== Distribution ==
This species is endemic to New Zealand and can be found throughout New Zealand including in Taranaki, Wellington, Blenheim, Nelson, Christchurch, Dunedin, Lake Wakatipu and Invercargill.

== Habitat and hosts ==
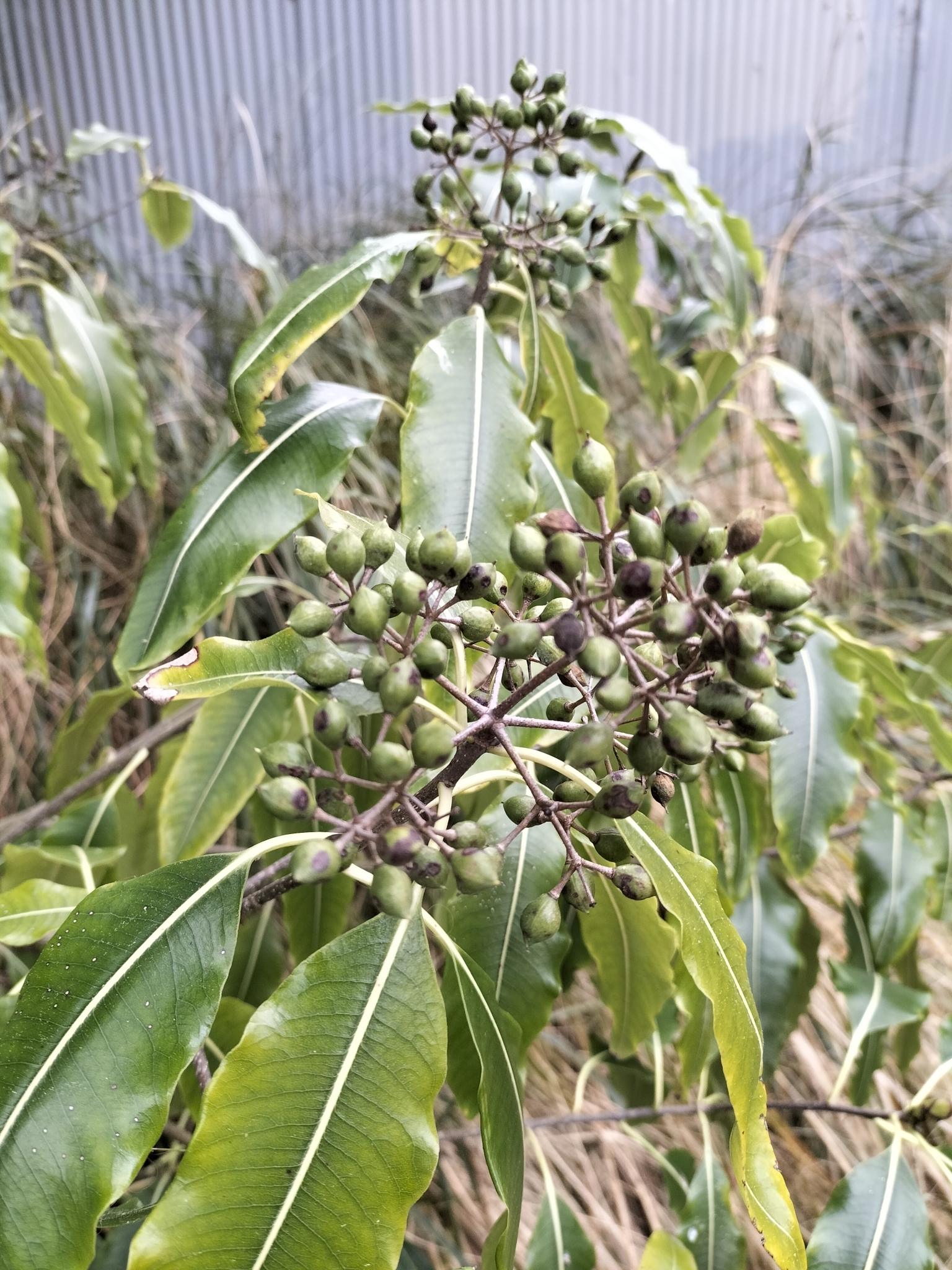
Fruits of lemonwood, a larval host of this species.

S. skelloni is found in a variety of habitats including native forest, coastal dunes, shrubland as well as cultivated gardens and orchards. The larvae of this species feed on a variety of native and introduced plants including dried gorse flowers, seeds and flowers of flax species, raupō seeds as well as fruits of lemonwood.

Larvae have been reared from dead and dying bracts, flowers, leaves and buds of Actinidia chinensis var. deliciosa (kiwifruit), old flowers and seeds of Calystegia tuguriorum, the seedpods of Phormium tenax and from flowers of species in the genus Senecio.

== Behaviour ==
Adults are on the wing from September until March. They are a nocturnal species and are attracted to light. This species is similar to other species in its family in that at rest it holds its hind legs outside of its wings. In this posture only the feet of its hind legs touch the ground.

== Parasites ==
Larvae of this species have been observed as being parasitised by the fly species Trigonospila brevifacies.

== Interaction with humans ==
This species is a known pest of agricultural crops produced in New Zealand such as kiwifruit and persimmons. Although found to be less frequently observed than S. horticola, S. skelloni is still regarded as an agricultural pest as its larvae are more likely to cause fruit damage compared to other agricultural pest moth species.

It has been hypothesised that constant ambient temperatures above 22°C during the larval stage of development renders adult moths of this species infertile.
