= Stathmopoda placida =

Scientific classification
- Kingdom: Animalia
- Phylum: Arthropoda
- Class: Insecta
- Order: Lepidoptera
- Family: Stathmopodidae
- Genus: Stathmopoda
- Species: S. placida

Binomial name
- Stathmopoda placida Meyrick, 1908

Species of moth

Stathmopoda placida is a species of moth of the family Stathmopodidae. It is found in Myanmar.

This species has a wingspan of 10–11 mm. The forewings are rather dark fuscous, with a slight purplish tinge and two broad white fasciae, the first very broad dorsally, where it covers the basal third of the wing, much narrowed towards the costa at beyond one-fourth, the margins straight, enclosed the basal area of the costa ochreous-whitish irrorated with black. The second fascia is found at two-thirds. It is rather narrowed towards the costa, with the anterior edge straight, the posterior convex and oblique. The hindwings are grey.
