= Stathmopoda triloba =

Scientific classification
- Kingdom: Animalia
- Phylum: Arthropoda
- Class: Insecta
- Order: Lepidoptera
- Family: Stathmopodidae
- Genus: Stathmopoda
- Species: S. triloba

Binomial name
- Stathmopoda triloba Meyrick, 1913

Species of moth

Stathmopoda triloba is a moth of the family Stathmopodidae first described by Edward Meyrick in 1913. It is found in Sri Lanka.
