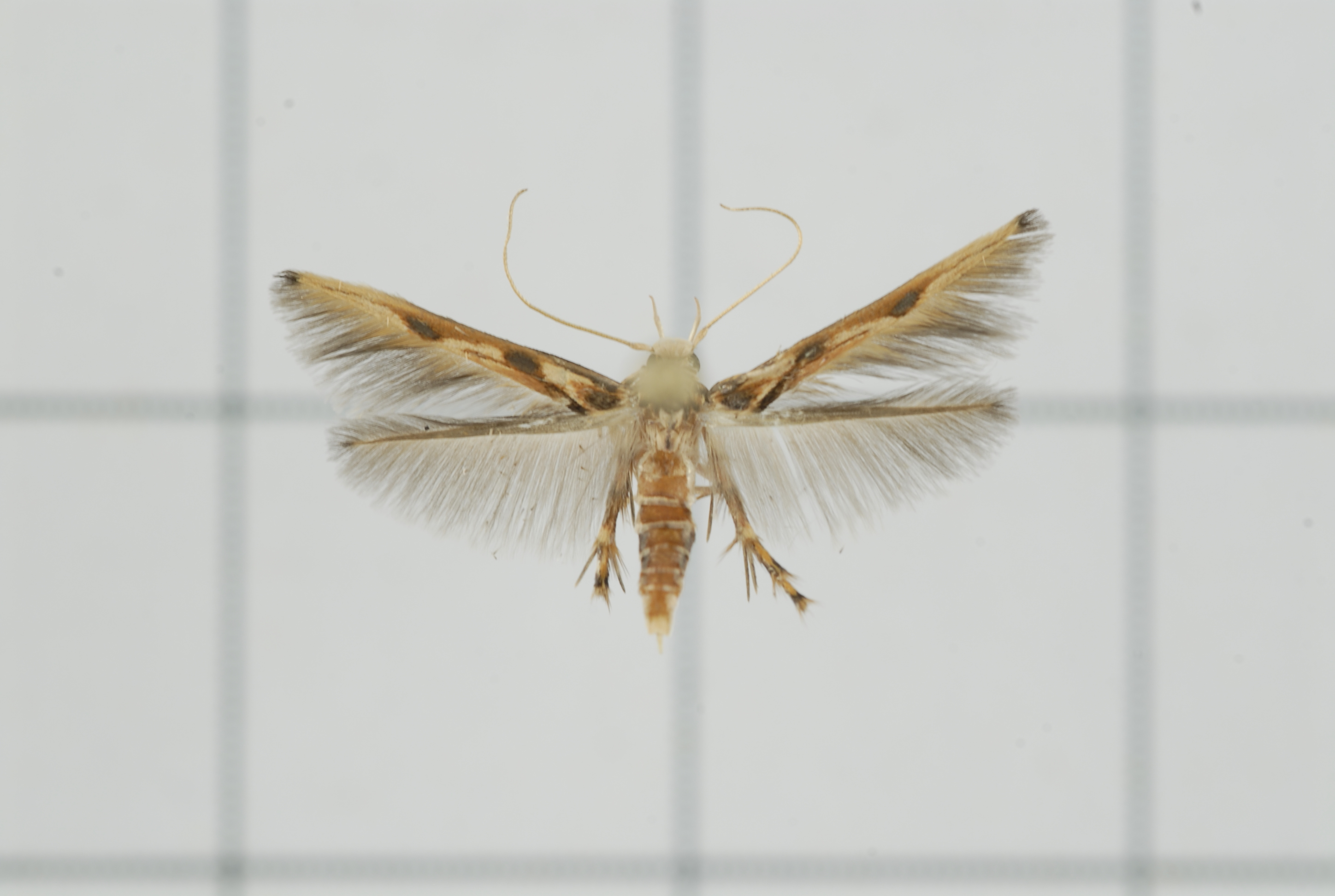

Scientific classification
- Kingdom: Animalia
- Phylum: Arthropoda
- Class: Insecta
- Order: Lepidoptera
- Family: Stathmopodidae
- Genus: Stathmopoda
- Species: S. stimulata

Binomial name
- Stathmopoda stimulata Meyrick, 1913

= Stathmopoda stimulata =

Species of moth

Stathmopoda stimulata is a moth of the family Stathmopodidae first described by Edward Meyrick in 1913. It is found in India and Sri Lanka. Japan and Korea
