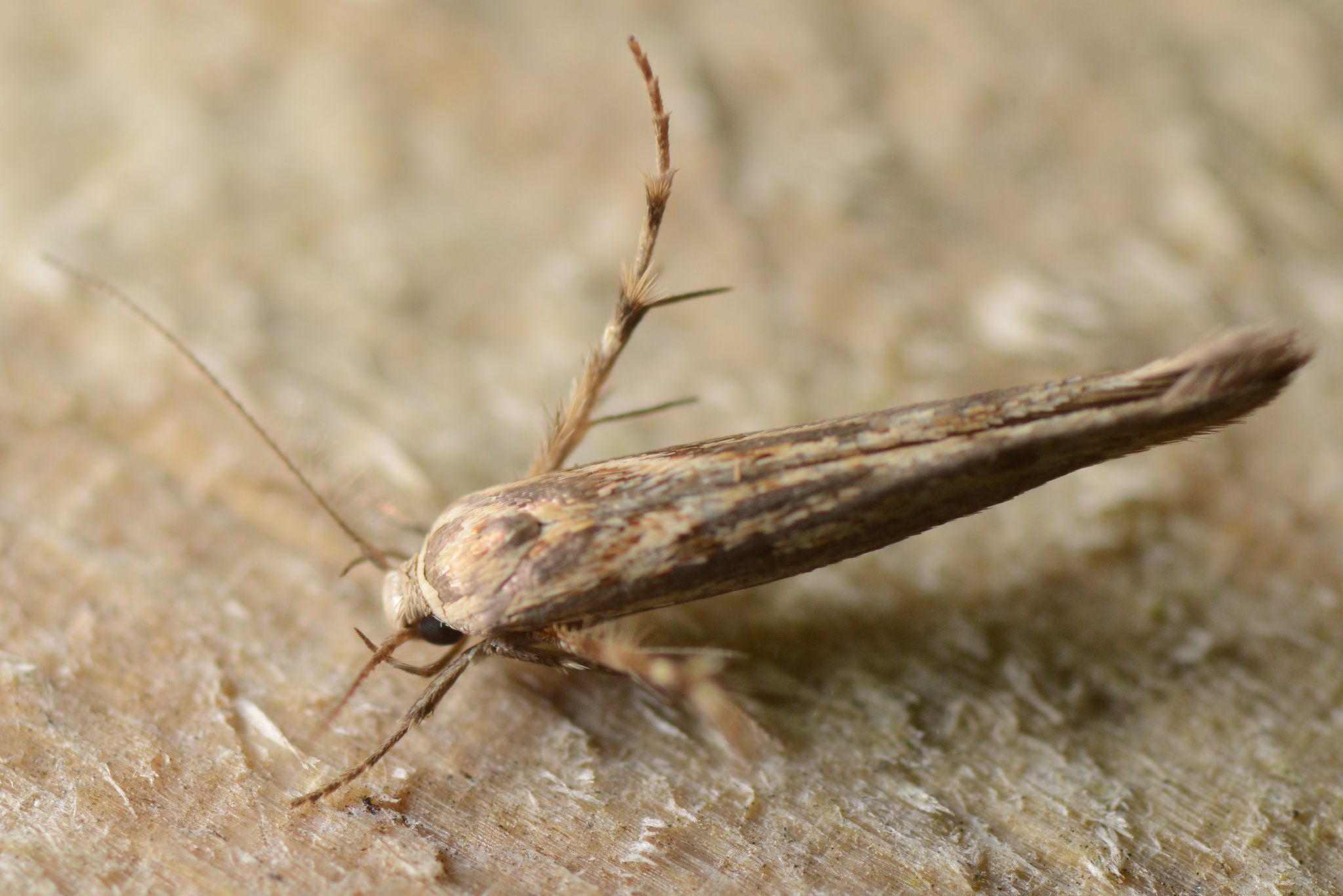

Scientific classification
- Kingdom: Animalia
- Phylum: Arthropoda
- Class: Insecta
- Order: Lepidoptera
- Family: Stathmopodidae
- Genus: Stathmopoda
- Species: S. plumbiflua

Binomial name
- Stathmopoda plumbiflua Meyrick, 1911

= Stathmopoda plumbiflua =

Species of moth

Stathmopoda plumbiflua is a moth of the family Stathmopodidae. It was described by Edward Meyrick in 1911 and is found in New Zealand.
