= Stathmopoda diplaspis =

Scientific classification
- Domain: Eukaryota
- Kingdom: Animalia
- Phylum: Arthropoda
- Class: Insecta
- Order: Lepidoptera
- Family: Stathmopodidae
- Genus: Stathmopoda
- Species: S. diplaspis

Binomial name
- Stathmopoda diplaspis (Meyrick, 1887)

Synonyms
- Placostola diplaspis Meyrick, 1887; Stathmopoda ovigera Meyrick, 1913

Species of moth

Stathmopoda diplaspis is a moth of the Stathmopodidae family. It is found in United Kingdom, Saudi Arabia, Iran, Afghanistan, Pakistan, India, Sri Lanka, Tajikistan, Afghanistan and Thailand.

Wingspan of adult 9.5 mm. Antenna copperish brown. Thorax ochreous brown. Forewing very narrow with a broad base. Forewing copperish brown, with two shining white patches. Hindwing very narrow, pale grey. Legs copperish brown. Abdomen pale grey with a pale yellow caudal tuft.
