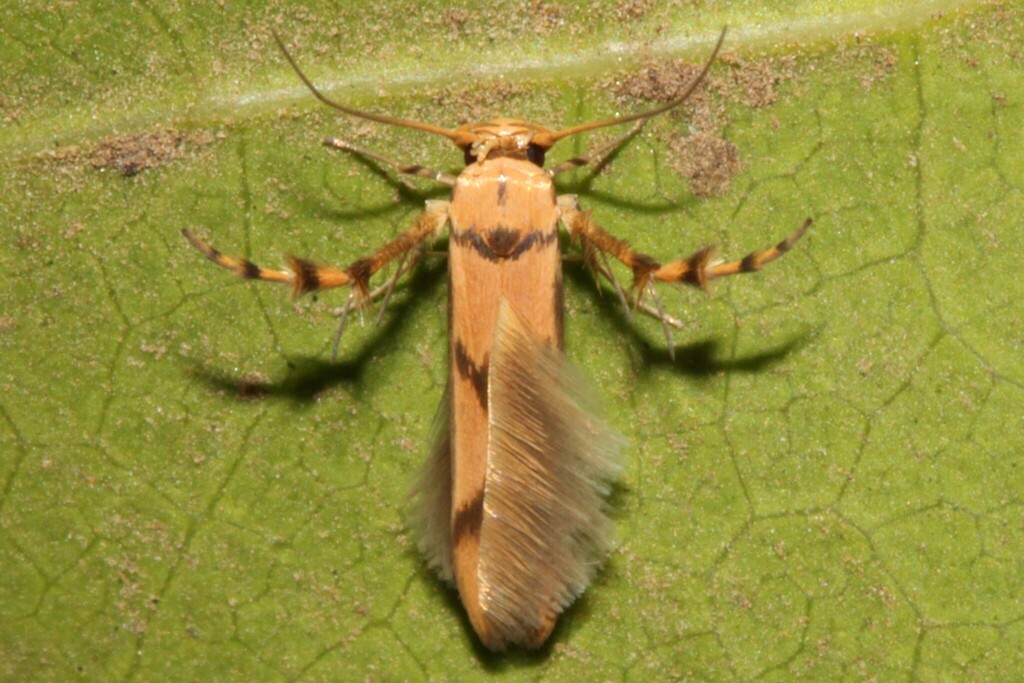

Scientific classification
- Kingdom: Animalia
- Phylum: Arthropoda
- Clade: Pancrustacea
- Class: Insecta
- Order: Lepidoptera
- Family: Stathmopodidae
- Genus: Stathmopoda
- Species: S. ficivora

Binomial name
- Stathmopoda ficivora Kasy, 1973

= Stathmopoda ficivora =

Species of moth

Stathmopoda ficivora is a species of moth in the family Stathmopodidae. It was described by Friedrich Kasy in 1973. This species has been documented in Namibia, Nigeria, and South Africa.
