= Stathmopoda teleozona =

Scientific classification
- Kingdom: Animalia
- Phylum: Arthropoda
- Clade: Pancrustacea
- Class: Insecta
- Order: Lepidoptera
- Family: Stathmopodidae
- Genus: Stathmopoda
- Species: S. teleozona

Binomial name
- Stathmopoda teleozona Meyrick, 1921

Species of moth

Stathmopoda teleozona is a species of moth in the family Stathmopodidae. It was described by Edward Meyrick in 1921. This species has been documented in Mozambique.
