= Stathmopoda luminata =

Scientific classification
- Kingdom: Animalia
- Phylum: Arthropoda
- Clade: Pancrustacea
- Class: Insecta
- Order: Lepidoptera
- Family: Stathmopodidae
- Genus: Stathmopoda
- Species: S. luminata

Binomial name
- Stathmopoda luminata Meyrick, 1911

Species of moth

Stathmopoda luminata is a species of moth in the family Stathmopodidae. It was described by Edward Meyrick in 1911. This species has been documented in southern Africa.
