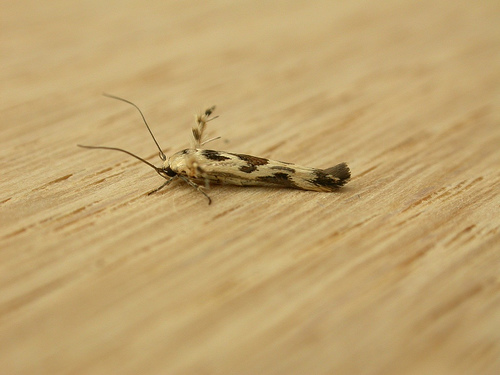

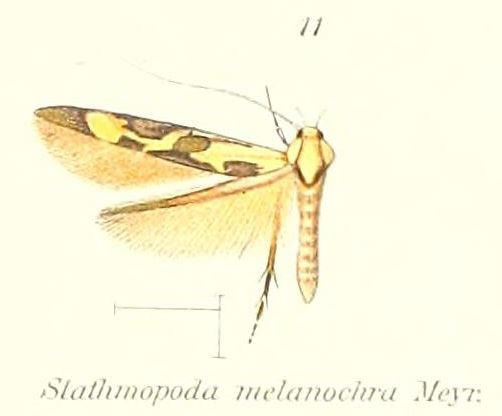

Scientific classification
- Kingdom: Animalia
- Phylum: Arthropoda
- Class: Insecta
- Order: Lepidoptera
- Family: Stathmopodidae
- Genus: Stathmopoda
- Species: S. melanochra

Binomial name
- Stathmopoda melanochra Meyrick, 1897

= Stathmopoda melanochra =

Species of moth

Stathmopoda melanochra is a species of moth of the family Stathmopodidae. It is found in Australia and New Zealand.
