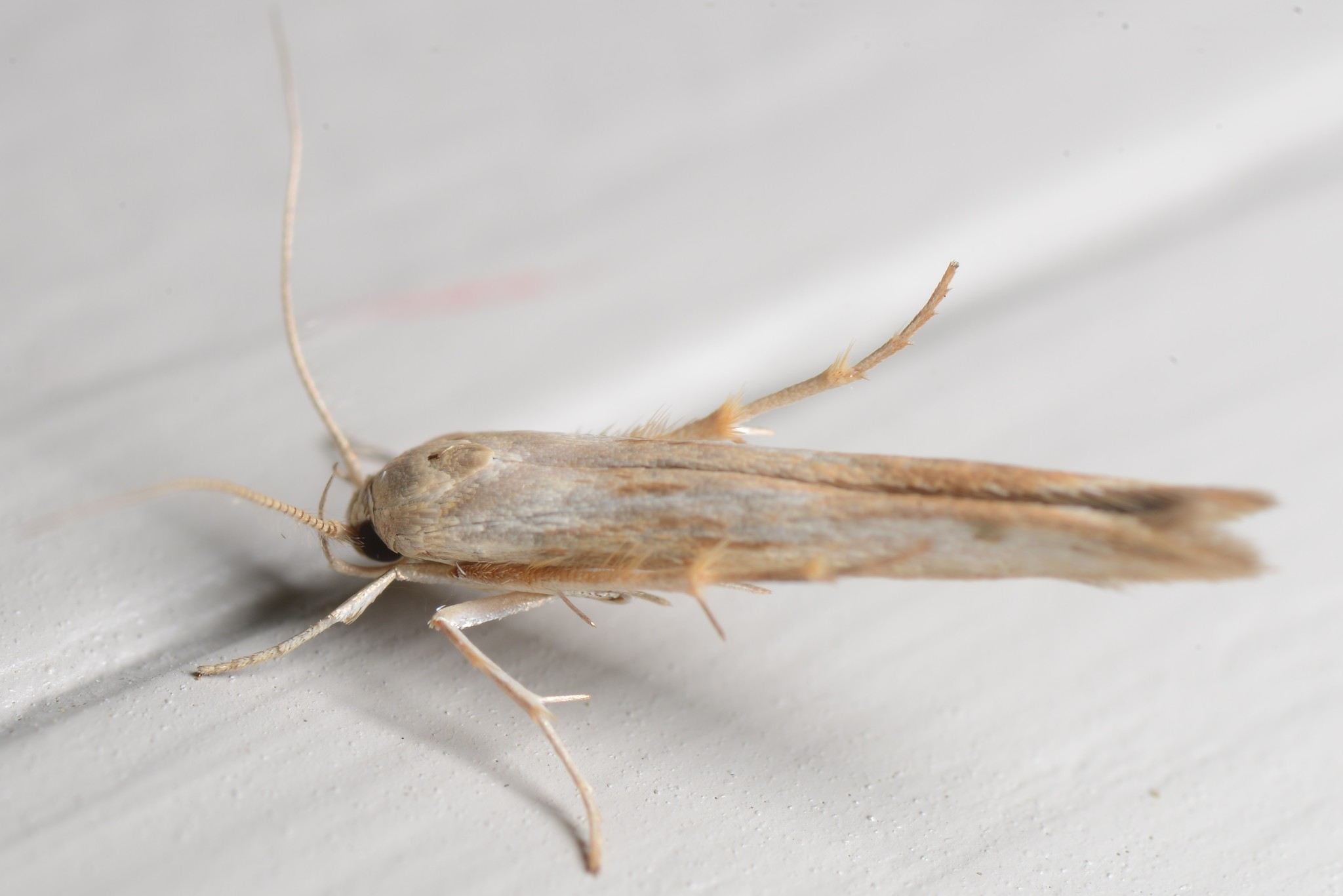

Scientific classification
- Kingdom: Animalia
- Phylum: Arthropoda
- Clade: Pancrustacea
- Class: Insecta
- Order: Lepidoptera
- Family: Stathmopodidae
- Genus: Stathmopoda
- Species: S. aposema

Binomial name
- Stathmopoda aposema Meyrick, 1901

= Stathmopoda aposema =

Species of moth endemic to New Zealand

Stathmopoda aposema or the Kowhai seed moth, is a species of moth of the family Stathmopodidae. It was first described by Edward Meyrick in 1901. This species is endemic in New Zealand and has been observed in both the North and South Islands. This moth inhabits native forest and scrub and can also be found in sand dune habitat, residential gardens and commercial orchards. Eggs are laid on the seed pods of its host plants, species in the genus Sophora.

Larvae bore into the pods and seeds of their hosts and then overwinter within those seeds. In the New Zealand early spring the larvae feed on the seeds and then pupate within them in a silken cocoon. Research suggests that constant temperatures above 22°C during the larval stage of development renders the adult moths infertile.

Adults begin to emerge in October. Adults are attracted to light and are most commonly observed from October until December. This species plays host to the parasitic wasp Meteorus luteus.

== Taxonomy ==
This species was first described by Edward Meyrick in 1901 using a specimen he collected in Auckland in December. It was discussed and illustrated by George Hudson in his 1928 book The butterflies and moths of New Zealand. The male holotype is held at the Natural History Museum, London.

== Description ==
Illustration of female by Hudson.

Meyrick described this species as follows:

♂. 19 mm. Head, antennae, and thorax whitish-ochreous. Palpi ochreous-whitish. Abdomen pale grey, towards base pale ochreous. Legs ochreous-whitish, anterior pair dark grey, posterior pair grey-spotted. Forewings whitish-ochreous, with a few light brownish scales, and a light brownish suffusion along termen; a grey elongate submedian mark in disc at 2/3 cilia light fuscous, on costa whitish-ochreous. Hindwings dark grey, pale and thinly scaled towards base ; cilia grey.

== Distribution ==
S. aposema is endemic to New Zealand. It has been observed in both the North and South Islands.

== Habitat and hosts ==
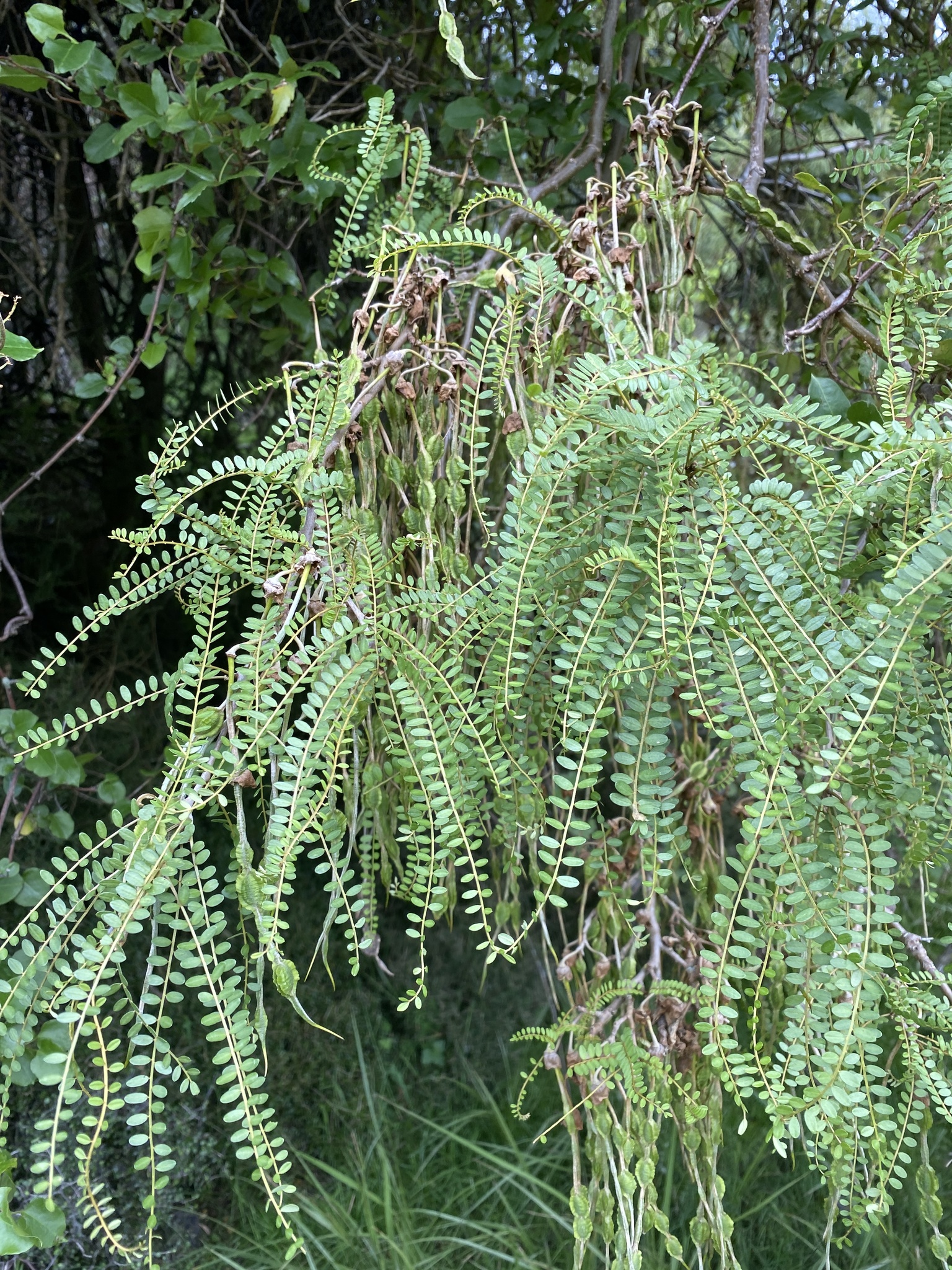
Larval host S. microphylla.

S. aposema inhabits native forest and scrubland as well as sand dunes, residential gardens and commercial orchards. The larvae of this species feed on the seeds of Sophora microphylla and Sophora prostrata.

== Life stages and behaviour ==
Adults lay eggs during the flowering and seed pod development of their host species. Eggs are laid on pods on the edge of the seed mound or near any hole present on the pod. Eggs hatch after approximately ten days and after hatching larvae bore into the developing seed pods of their host. They then overwinter within seeds. In early spring larvae continue to feed and develop, taking between two and nine weeks to reach the pupation stage. The larvae then spin a silken cocoon in which they pupate for approximately three weeks. Adults start emerging in October and live for around two to three weeks.

Larvae have been observed cannibalising other larvae and eggs.

Adults are attracted to light and are commonly observed from October until December. This species has been collected amongst Sophora microphylla and by beating Rubus cissoides.

Research into both the ambient temperature and the length of exposure to daylight, and how this affects the development of larvae of this species, was undertaken in 1989. This research suggests that constant temperatures above 22°C during the larval stage renders adult moths of this species infertile.

== Parasites ==
This species plays host to Meteorus luteus, a species of parasitoid wasp.
