= Dolophrosynella =

Scientific classification
- Kingdom: Animalia
- Phylum: Arthropoda
- Clade: Pancrustacea
- Class: Insecta
- Order: Lepidoptera
- Family: Stathmopodidae
- Genus: Dolophrosynella; Fletcher, 1940
- Species: D. balteata

Binomial name
- Dolophrosynella balteata (Durrant, 1919)

Synonyms
- Dolophrosyne balteata Durrant, 1919

Genus of moths

Dolophrosynella balteata is a moth of the family Stathmopodidae. It is the only species in the genus Dolophrosynella. It is found in Queensland.

== Taxonomy ==
When first described, this species was included in the family Sesiidae.
