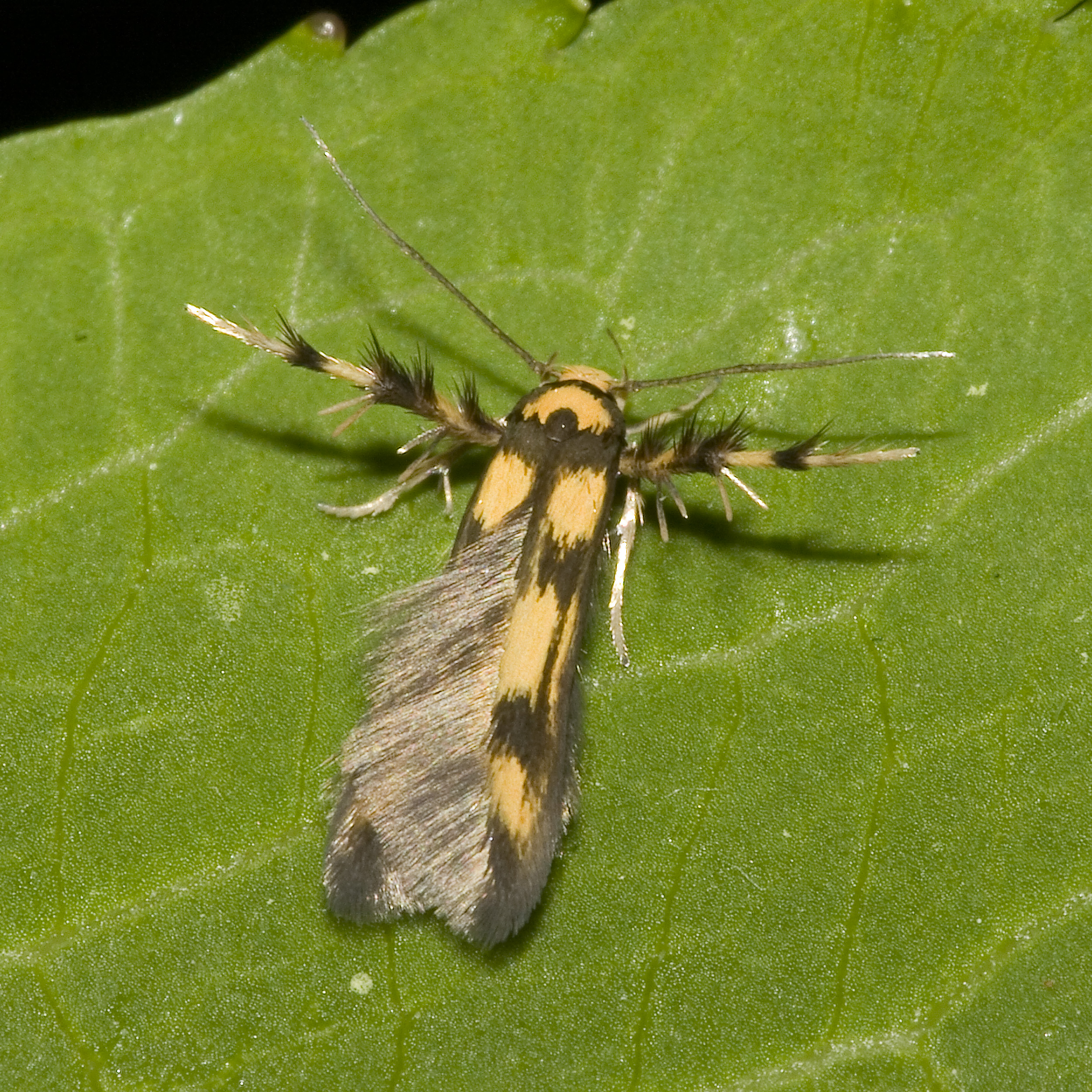
- Stathmopoda pedella

Scientific classification
- Kingdom: Animalia
- Phylum: Arthropoda
- Clade: Pancrustacea
- Class: Insecta
- Order: Lepidoptera
- Family: Stathmopodidae
- Genus: Stathmopoda; Herrich-Schäffer, 1853

Synonyms
- Boocara Butler, 1880; Placostola Meyrick, 1887; Erineda Busck, 1909; Agrioscelis Meyrick, 1913; Kakiuoria Nagano, 1916

= Stathmopoda =

Genus of moths

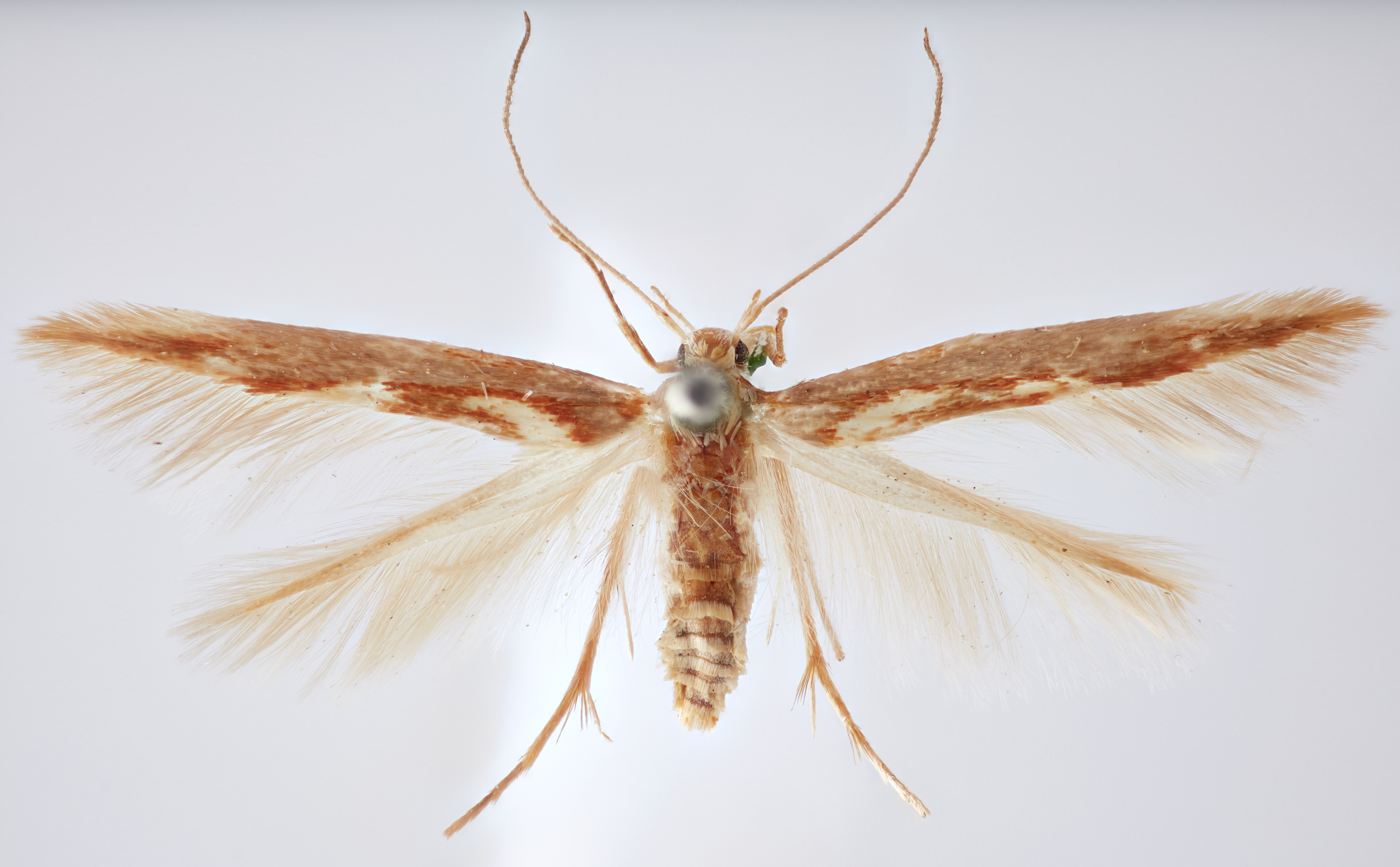
Stathmopoda campylocha

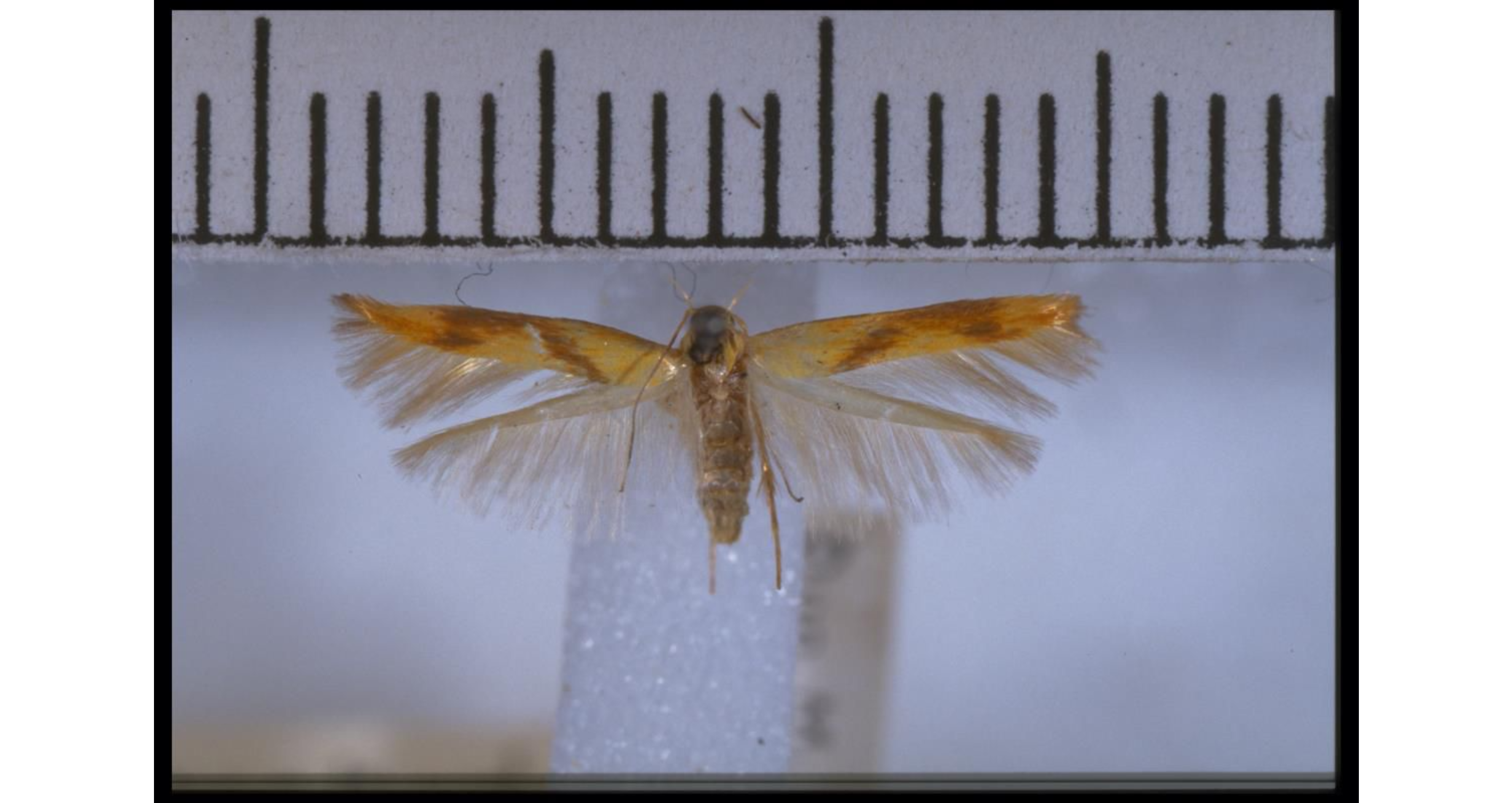
Stathmopoda distincta

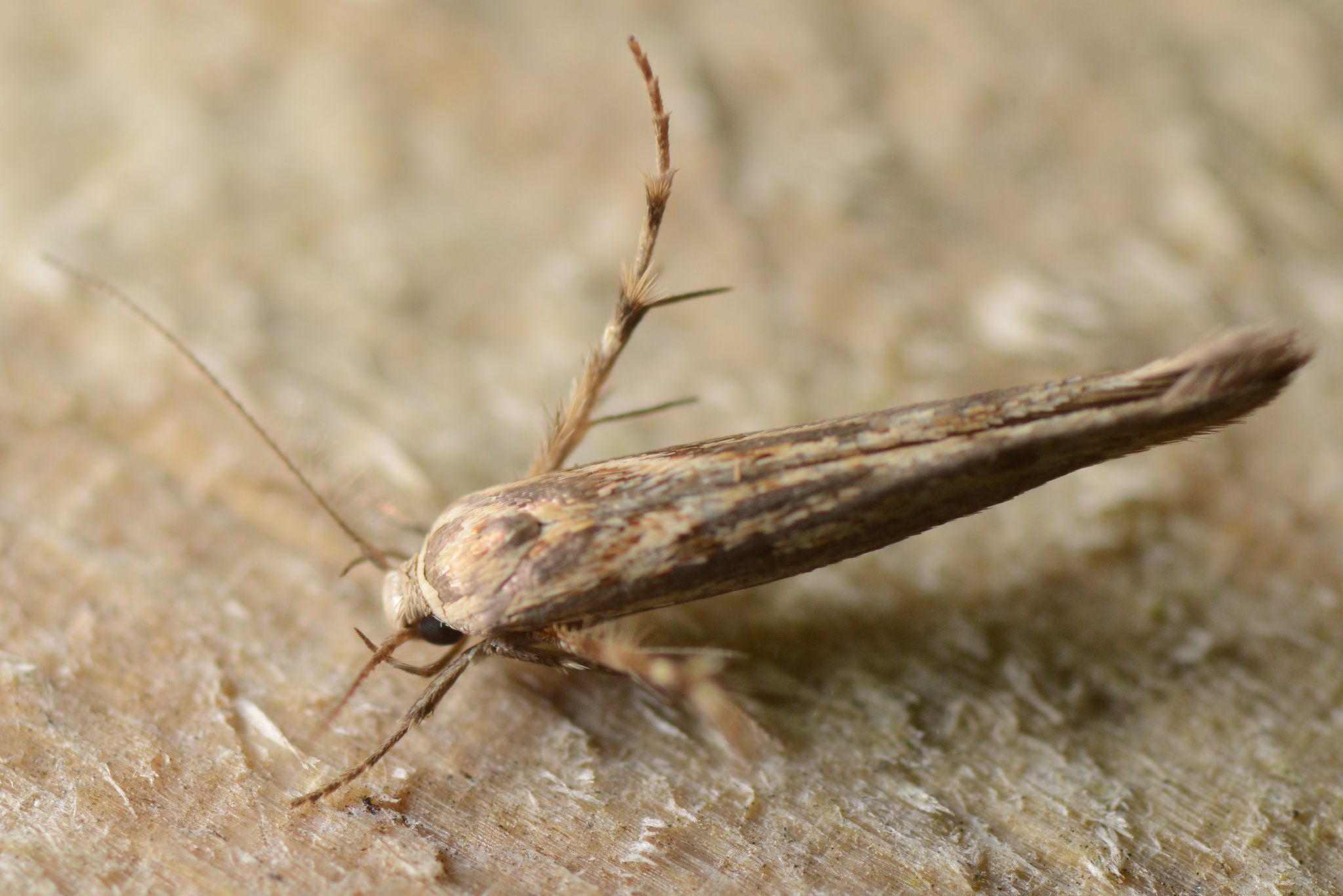
Stathmopoda plumbiflua

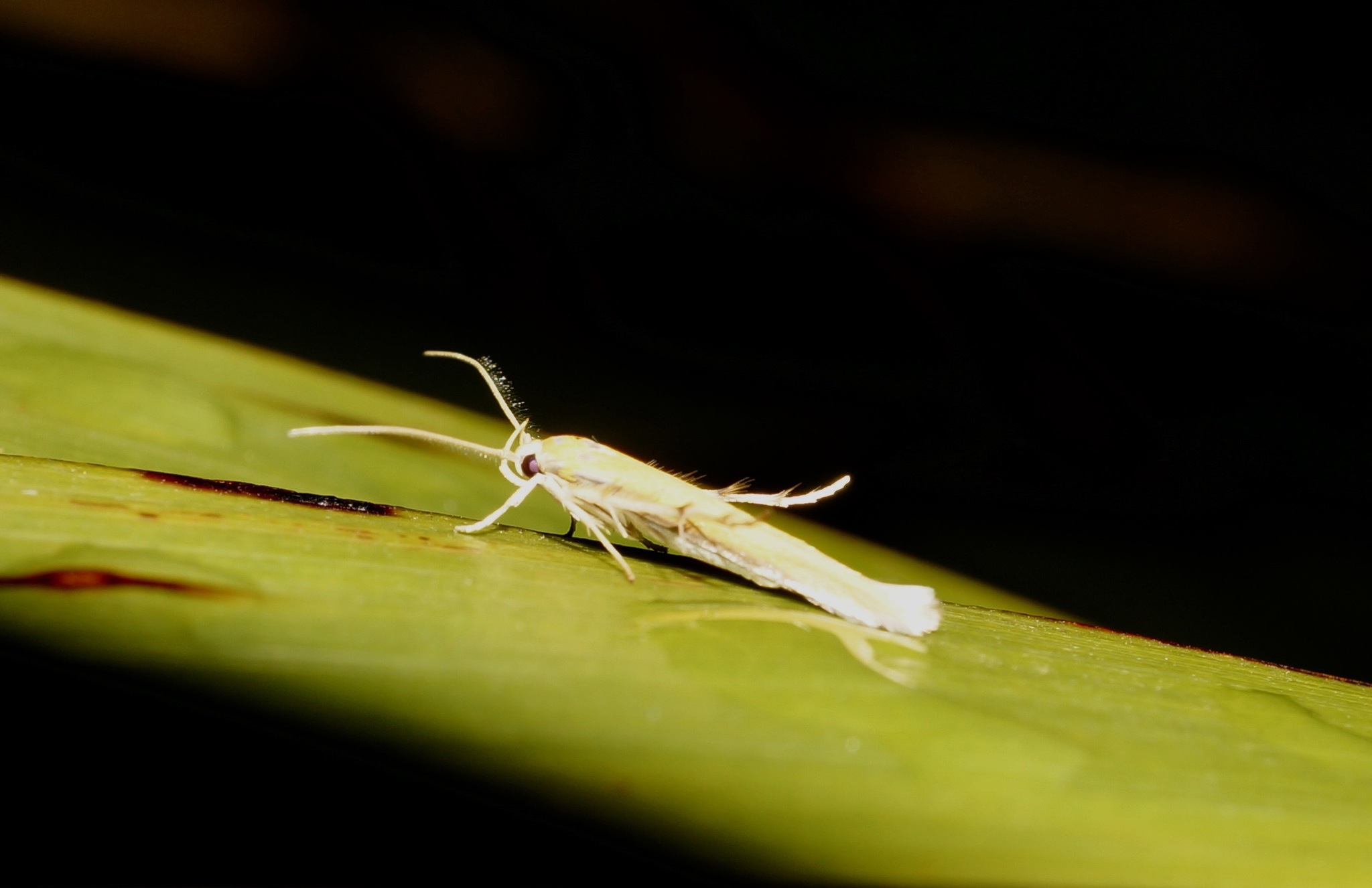
Stathmopoda skelloni

Stathmopoda is a genus of moths. It has variously been placed in its own family, Stathmopodidae, or in subfamily Stathmopodinae in the family Oecophoridae. Note that the phylogeny and systematics of gelechoid moths are still not fully resolved.

== Description ==
Stathmopoda have smooth heads with a metallic luster, and the occiput may be smooth or slightly coarse. The labial palps (part of the mouthparts) are curved, sharp-tipped and the second and third segments are similar in length. There is a pair of antennae which are shorter than the forewing, have elongate and clubbed scapes, and (in males) the flagella have long ciliae on the anterior margins.

Both forewings and hindwings are lanceolate, meaning they are widest near the base and taper to points at the end. The forewings are usually yellowish with dark brown markings. The tibiae of the hind legs have dense tufts.

Most of the abdominal tergites (2nd-7th of males, 2nd-6th of females) have spiniform (spine-like) setae along their posterior margins.

The male genitalia have a bell-shaped uncus that is setose laterally and tapering caudally, and is as long as the gnathos. The cucullus is densely setose on its inner margin. The female genitalia have the corpus bursae bearing a signum or a pair of signa. See Lepidoptera genitalia for definitions of these terms.

== Ecology ==
Larvae of Stathmopoda bore into seeds, fruits or buds of plants.

Some are agricultural pests. For example, S. auriferella is a pest of fruits and vegetables including apples, avocados, grapes, jujubes, kiwifruit, peaches and pomegranates. Stathmopoda masinissa can cause serious damage to persimmons.

== Selected species ==
- Stathmopoda aconias Meyrick, 1897 (India, Sri Lanka)
- Stathmopoda aegotricha Meyrick, 1921
- Stathmopoda aenea (Braun, 1918)
- Stathmopoda albata Meyrick, 1913 (Australia, New Guinea, Solomon Islands)
- Stathmopoda albimaculata Philpott, 1931
- Stathmopoda amathodes Turner, 1941
- Stathmopoda anconias Meyrick, 1910
- Stathmopoda anticyma Meyrick, 1927 (Samoa and Solomon Islands)
- Stathmopoda antischema Meyrick, 1922
- Stathmopoda aphanosema Turner, 1923
- Stathmopoda aposema Meyrick, 1901
- Stathmopoda arachnitis Meyrick, 1907 (Sri Lanka)
- Stathmopoda arachnophthora Turner, 1917
- Stathmopoda arcata Meyrick, 1913
- Stathmopoda aristodoxa Meyrick, 1926
- Stathmopoda astrapeis Meyrick, 1897
- Stathmopoda auriferella (Walker, 1864)
- Stathmopoda autoxantha Meyrick, 1913
- Stathmopoda basixantha Turner, 1917
- Stathmopoda bathrodelta Meyrick, 1921
- Stathmopoda biclavis Meyrick, 1911
- Stathmopoda bicolorella Koster, 2010
- Stathmopoda callichrysa Lower, 1893
- Stathmopoda calyptraea Meyrick, 1908 (Burma)
- Stathmopoda caminora Meyrick, 1890
- Stathmopoda campylocha Meyrick, 1889
- Stathmopoda canonica Meyrick, 1897
- Stathmopoda castanodes Turner, 1941
- Stathmopoda caveata Meyrick, 1913 (New Guinea, Solomon Islands)
- Stathmopoda cephalaea Meyrick, 1897
- Stathmopoda ceramoptila Turner, 1923
- Stathmopoda chalcotypa Meyrick, 1897
- Stathmopoda chalybeis Meyrick, 1897
- Stathmopoda citrinopis Meyrick, 1927
- Stathmopoda citroptila Turner, 1941
- Stathmopoda clarkei Viette, 1951
- Stathmopoda clyella Busck, 1909
- Stathmopoda coracodes Meyrick, 1923
- Stathmopoda cornutella Bradley, 1961 (Solomon Islands)
- Stathmopoda crassella Walsingham, 1891
- Stathmopoda crocophanes Meyrick, 1897
- Stathmopoda cyanopla Meyrick, 1897
- Stathmopoda daubanella (Legrand, 1958)
- Stathmopoda desmoteles Meyrick, 1897
- Stathmopoda dracaenopa Meyrick, 1933 (Fidji, Guam, Solomon Islands)
- Stathmopoda diclidias Meyrick, 1921
- Stathmopoda dimochla Turner, 1941
- Stathmopoda diplaspis (Meyrick, 1887)
- Stathmopoda distincta Philpott, 1923
- Stathmopoda doratias Meyrick, 1897
- Stathmopoda effossa Meyrick, 1921
- Stathmopoda elyella Busck, 1909
- Stathmopoda endotherma Meyrick, 1931
- Stathmopoda electrantha Meyrick, 1927 (New Hebrides, Solomon Islands)
- Stathmopoda epilampra Meyrick, 1911
- Stathmopoda eucorystis Meyrick, 1936
- Stathmopoda euzona (Turner, 1926)
- Stathmopoda ficivora Kasy, 1973
- Stathmopoda filicula Clarke, 1978
- Stathmopoda glyceropa Meyrick, 1915
- Stathmopoda glyphanobola Diakonoff, 1983
- Stathmopoda grammatopis Meyrick, 1921
- Stathmopoda haplophanes Bradley, 1961 (Solomon Islands)
- Stathmopoda hemiplecta Meyrick, 1921
- Stathmopoda hexatyla Meyrick, 1907 (Sri Lanka, Russia)
- Stathmopoda holobapta Lower, 1904
- Stathmopoda holochra Meyrick, 1889
- Stathmopoda holothecta Meyrick, 1934
- Stathmopoda horticola Dugdale, 1988
- Stathmopoda hyposcia Meyrick, 1897
- Stathmopoda imperator Bradley, 1957 (Solomon Islands)
- Stathmopoda iners Meyrick, 1913
- Stathmopoda iodes Meyrick, 1897
- Stathmopoda ischnotis Meyrick, 1897
- Stathmopoda isoclera (Meyrick, 1897)
- Stathmopoda lethonoa Meyrick, 1897
- Stathmopoda liporrhoa Meyrick, 1897
- Stathmopoda luminata Meyrick, 1911
- Stathmopoda luxuriosa Meyrick, 1911
- Stathmopoda lychnacma (Meyrick, 1927)
- Stathmopoda maculata Walsingham, 1891
- Stathmopoda maisongrossiella Viette, 1954
- Stathmopoda mannophora Turner, 1900
- Stathmopoda margabim Viette, 1995 (Reunion)
- Stathmopoda maritimicola Terada & Sakamaki, 2011
- Stathmopoda marmarosticha Turner, 1941
- Stathmopoda masinissa Meyrick, 1906 (Sri Lanka)
- Stathmopoda megathyma Meyrick, 1897
- Stathmopoda melanochra Meyrick, 1897 (Australia)
- Stathmopoda mesombra Meyrick, 1897
- Stathmopoda metopias Meyrick, 1920
- Stathmopoda mimantha Meyrick, 1913
- Stathmopoda monoxesta (Meyrick, 1929)
- Stathmopoda morelella Legrand, 1966
- Stathmopoda moschlosema Bradley, 1961 (Solomon Islands)
- Stathmopoda mysteriastis Meyrick, 1901
- Stathmopoda nephocentra Meyrick, 1921
- Stathmopoda nitida Meyrick, 1913
- Stathmopoda notochorda Meyrick, 1907 (Sri Lanka)
- Stathmopoda notosticha Turner, 1941
- Stathmopoda nucivora Meyrick, 1932 (Solomon Islands)
- Stathmopoda nympheuteria Turner, 1941
- Stathmopoda ochrochyta (Turner, 1926)
- Stathmopoda osteitis Meyrick, 1917
- Stathmopoda pampolia Turner, 1923
- Stathmopoda pantarches Meyrick, 1897
- Stathmopoda pedella (Linnaeus, 1761)
- Stathmopoda pedestrella Legrand, 1966
- Stathmopoda perfuga (Meyrick, 1928)
- Stathmopoda periclina Meyrick, 1938 (New Guinea, Solomon Islands)
- Stathmopoda placida Meyrick, 1908 (Burma)
- Stathmopoda platynipha Turner, 1923
- Stathmopoda plumbiflua Meyrick, 1911
- Stathmopoda pomifera Meyrick, 1913
- Stathmopoda principalis Meyrick, 1913 (Comoros)
- Stathmopoda ptycholampra Turner, 1941
- Stathmopoda pyrrhogramma Meyrick, 1930
- Stathmopoda recondita Turner, 1941
- Stathmopoda revincta Meyrick, 1921
- Stathmopoda rhodocosma Turner, 1941
- Stathmopoda rhythmota Meyrick, 1920
- Stathmopoda rubripicta Meyrick, 1921
- Stathmopoda sentica (Lower, 1899)
- Stathmopoda skelloni (Butler, 1880)
- Stathmopoda sphendonita Meyrick, 1921
- Stathmopoda stimulata Meyrick, 1913
- Stathmopoda superdaubanella (Legrand, 1958)
- Stathmopoda tacita (Meyrick, 1913) (from east Asia, Taiwan)
- Stathmopoda teleozona Meyrick, 1921
- Stathmopoda tetrazyga Meyrick, 1936 (Solomon Islands)
- Stathmopoda trichodora (Meyrick, 1909)
- Stathmopoda trichopeda Lower, 1904
- Stathmopoda trichrysa
- Stathmopoda tridryas Meyrick, 1934
- Stathmopoda trifida Meyrick, 1921
- Stathmopoda triloba Meyrick, 1913
- Stathmopoda trimochla Turner, 1941
- Stathmopoda trimolybdias Meyrick, 1926
- Stathmopoda triselena Meyrick, 1897
- Stathmopoda tritophaea Turner, 1917
- Stathmopoda vadoniella Viette, 1954
- Stathmopoda xanthocrana Turner, 1933
- Stathmopoda xanthoma Meyrick, 1897
- Stathmopoda xanthoplitis Meyrick, 1908
- Stathmopoda zalodes Meyrick, 1913
- Stathmopoda zophoptila Turner, 1941

== Former species ==
- Stathmopoda attiei Guillermet, 2011 (now in Calicotis - from China, Japan, Réunion, Taiwan)
