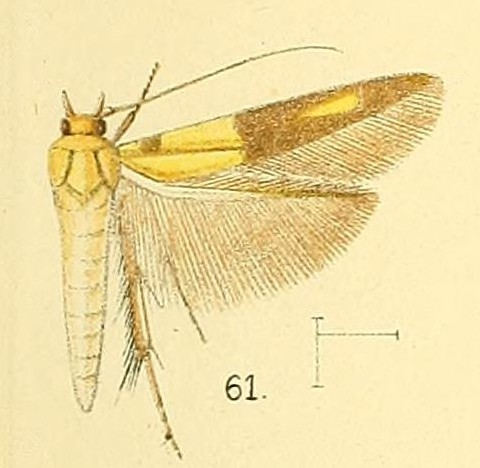
- Stathmopoda auriferella

Scientific classification
- Kingdom: Animalia
- Phylum: Arthropoda
- Class: Insecta
- Order: Lepidoptera
- Family: Stathmopodidae
- Genus: Stathmopoda
- Species: S. auriferella

Binomial name
- Stathmopoda auriferella (Walker, 1864)

Synonyms
- Gelechia? auriferella Walker, 1864; Stathmopoda diuisa Walsingham, 1891; Stathmopoda ischnotis Meyrick, 1897; Stathmopoda crocophanes Meyrick, 1897; Aeoloscelis theoris Meyrick, 1906; Stathmopoda tharsalea Meyrick, 1914; Stathmopoda adulatrix Meyrick, 1917; Stathmopoda cirrhaspis Meyrick, 1922; Chrysoclista basiflauella Matsumura, 1931

= Stathmopoda auriferella =

Species of moth

Stathmopoda auriferella is a species of moth in the Stathmopodidae family. It is found in the Oriental and Afrotropical regions. In the Palearctic it is only found in subtropical areas such as the Middle East and the Russian Far East.

The wingspan is 9–13 mm. Adults are on wing from June to December. There are probably two to three generations per year.
