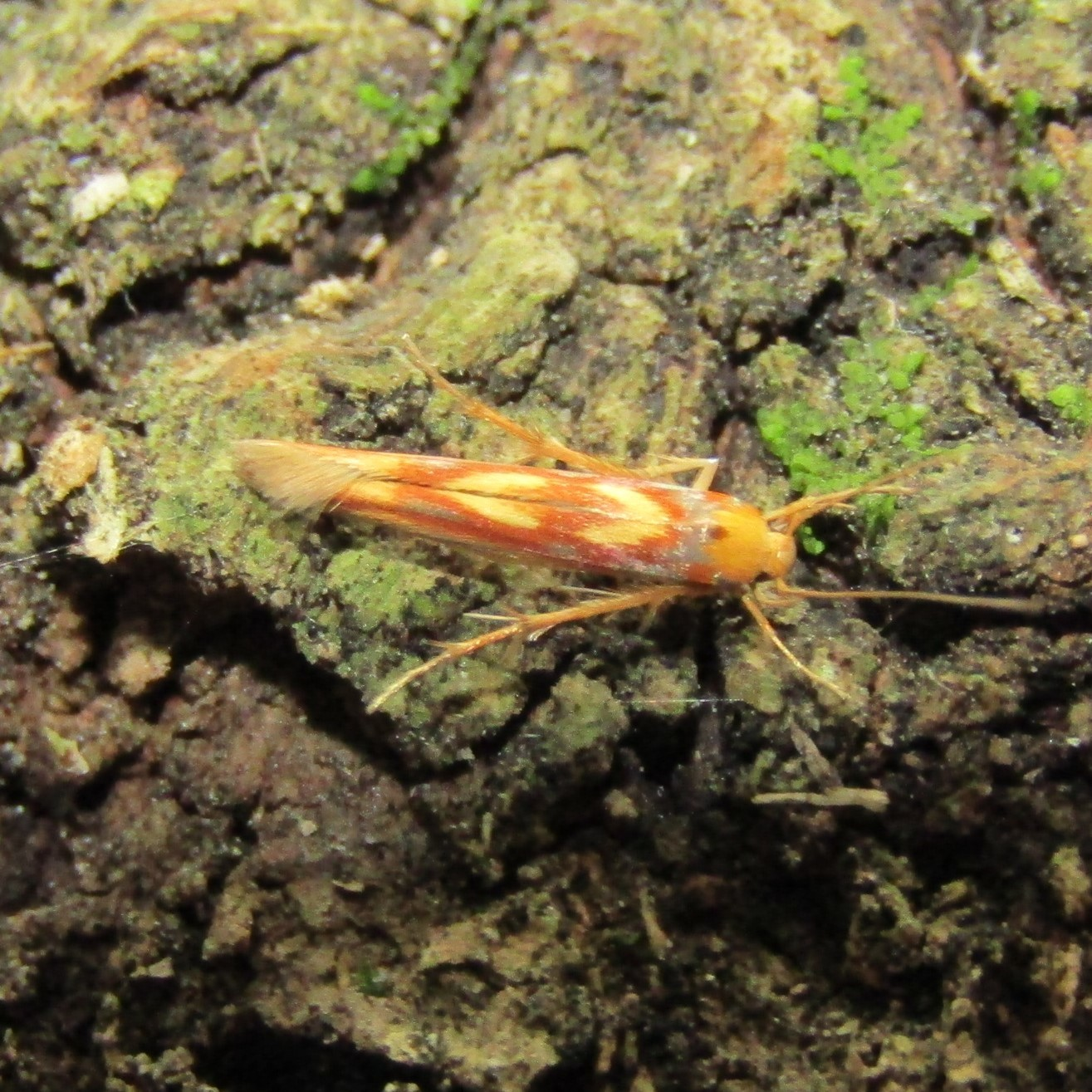

Scientific classification
- Kingdom: Animalia
- Phylum: Arthropoda
- Clade: Pancrustacea
- Class: Insecta
- Order: Lepidoptera
- Family: Stathmopodidae
- Genus: Stathmopoda
- Species: S. caminora

Binomial name
- Stathmopoda caminora Meyrick, 1890

= Stathmopoda caminora =

Species of moth endemic to New Zealand

Stathmopoda caminora is a species of moth in the family Stathmopodidae. It was first described by Edward Meyrick in 1890. It is endemic to New Zealand and is found on the North and South Islands. This species inhabits native forest. Adults are most commonly observed on the wing from October to December.

== Taxonomy ==
This species was first described by Edward Meyrick in 1890 using a female specimen collected by George Hudson in Wellington. S. caminora was discussed and illustrated by George Hudson in his 1928 book The butterflies and moths of New Zealand. The female holotype is held by the Natural History Museum, London.

== Description ==
Illustration of male.

Meyrick described this species as follows:

♀. 12mm. Head whitish-yellowish, slightly ferruginous-tinged on crown, face more whitish. Palpi and antennae yellow-whitish. Thorax ferruginous, posteriorly pale yellowish. Abdomen and legs whitish, anterior legs infuscated. Forewings elongate, very narrow, slightly broadest near base, long-pointed; pale yellowish; a thick cloudy ferruginous-reddish longitudinal median streak from base to apex, posteriorly dilated so as to extend along hindmargin to anal angle, and abruptly dilated towards base so as to extend to inner margin ; a large ferruginous-reddish spot about middle of inner margin, confluent with central streak; a dark-grey longitudinal streak from base of costa to anal angle, traversing central ferruginous streak and lying wholly in it: cilia ochreous-grey-whitish. Hindwings and cilia ochreous-whitish.

This species is variable in appearance.

== Distribution ==
This species is endemic to New Zealand. It is found throughout the North and South Islands and was regarded by Hudson as being common.

== Habitat ==
This species inhabits native forest.

== Behaviour ==
Live specimen showing resting position.

Adults are most commonly observed on the wing from October to December. At rest this species holds its hind legs above and to the side of its forewings. Adult specimens have been collected by beating shrubs and via light traps.
