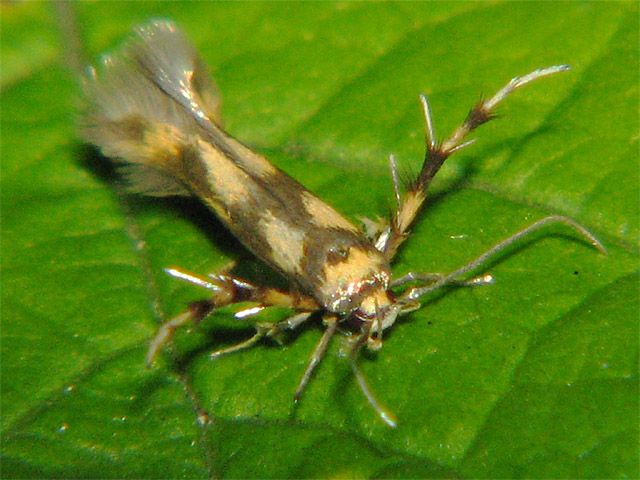
- Stathmopoda pedella

Scientific classification
- Kingdom: Animalia
- Phylum: Arthropoda
- Clade: Pancrustacea
- Class: Insecta
- Order: Lepidoptera
- Superfamily: Gelechioidea
- Family: Stathmopodidae; Meyrick, 1913

Synonyms
- Stathmopodinae

= Stathmopodidae =

Family of moths

Stathmopodidae is a family of moths in the moth superfamily Gelechioidea described by Edward Meyrick in 1913.

== Taxonomy and systematics ==
- Actinoscelis Meyrick, 1912 (from Queensland & India)
- Aeoloscelis Meyrick, 1897 (from Australia & South Africa)
- Arauzona Walker, [1865] (from Brasil & Guyana)
- Atkinsonia Stainton, 1859 (from Asia)
- Atrijuglans Yang, 1977 (from Asia)
- Calicotis Meyrick, 1889
- Cuprina Sinev, 1988
- Dolophrosynella T. B. Fletcher, 1940 (from Queensland)
- Ethirastis Meyrick, 1921 (from Australia)
- Eudaemoneura Diakonoff, 1948 (from New Guinea)
- Hieromantis Meyrick, 1897 (from Asia/Australia)
- Lamprystica Meyrick, 1914 (from Taiwan and Japan)
- Minomona Matsumura, 1931 (from Japan)
- Molybdurga Meyrick, 1897 (from Australia)
- Mylocera Turner, 1898 (from Australia)
- Neomariania Mariani, 1943
- Oedematopoda Zeller, 1852
- Pachyrhabda Meyrick, 1897
- Phytophlops Viette, 1958 (from Madagascar)
- Pseudaegeria Walsingham, 1889 (from Australia)
- Snellenia Walsingham, 1889 (from Australia, India, Japan)
- Stathmopoda Herrich-Schäffer, 1853
- Thylacosceles Meyrick, 1889 (from India, Sri Lanka, China)
- Thylacosceloides Sinev, 1988
- Tinaegeria Walker, 1856
- Tortilia Chrétien, 1908
- Trychnopepla Turner, 1941 (from Australia)
- Ursina Sinev, 1988
