= Heliodines roesella =

Scientific classification
- Kingdom: Animalia
- Phylum: Arthropoda
- Class: Insecta
- Order: Lepidoptera
- Family: Heliodinidae
- Genus: Heliodines
- Species: H. roesella

Binomial name
- Heliodines roesella (Linnaeus, 1758)

Species of moth

Heliodines roesella is a species of moth belonging to the family Heliodinidae.

It is native to Europe.
