= Aproaerema polychromella =

Scientific classification
- Kingdom: Animalia
- Phylum: Arthropoda
- Clade: Pancrustacea
- Class: Insecta
- Order: Lepidoptera
- Family: Gelechiidae
- Genus: Aproaerema
- Species: A. polychromella

Binomial name
- Aproaerema polychromella (Rebel, 1902)

Species of moth

Aproaerema polychromella is a species of moth in the family Gelechiidae. It was described by Hans Rebel in 1902. This species is widespread across Europe, Africa, and Asia.

== Ecology ==
Aproaerema polychromella has been associated with two host plants in the genus Astragalus.
