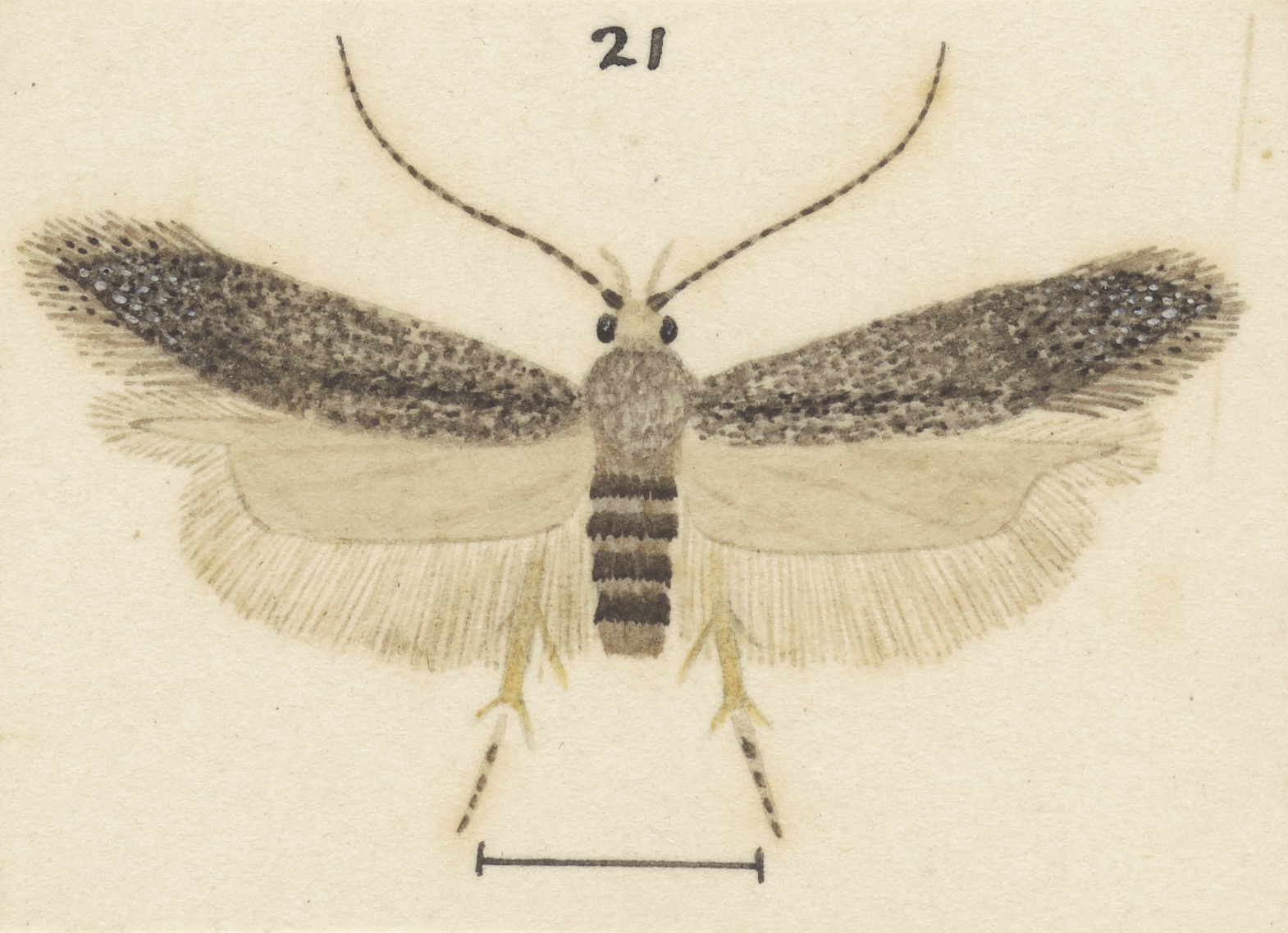

Scientific classification
- Kingdom: Animalia
- Phylum: Arthropoda
- Clade: Pancrustacea
- Class: Insecta
- Order: Lepidoptera
- Family: Gelechiidae
- Genus: Bilobata
- Species: B. subsecivella

Binomial name
- Bilobata subsecivella (Zeller, 1852)

Synonyms
- Gelechia (Brachmia) subsecivella Zeller, 1852; Stomopteryx columbina Philpott, 1928

= Bilobata subsecivella =

Species of moth

Bilobata subsecivella is a moth in the family Gelechiidae. It was described by Philipp Christoph Zeller in 1852. It is found in South Africa, India, Indonesia (Java), Mauritius and New Zealand.

The species was first recorded from New Zealand as Stomopteryx simplicella, but was redescribed as a new species based on comparison of the genitalia. Furthermore, the white mark at three-fourths of the forewings which is found in both these species, is reduced to a mere spot in columbina (while it often forms an almost complete fascia in simplicella).
