= Physoptila termiticola =

Scientific classification
- Domain: Eukaryota
- Kingdom: Animalia
- Phylum: Arthropoda
- Class: Insecta
- Order: Lepidoptera
- Family: Gelechiidae
- Genus: Physoptila
- Species: P. termiticola

Binomial name
- Physoptila termiticola (Turner, 1926)

Synonyms
- Aenicteria termiticola Turner, 1926

Species of moth

Physoptila termiticola is a moth of the family Gelechiidae. It was described by Alfred Jefferis Turner in 1926. It is found in Australia, where it has been recorded from Queensland.

The wingspan is about 14 mm. The forewings are white with fuscous markings. There is a suffused spot on the dorsum before the middle and a spot on the tornus, as well as a dot on the costa at two-fifths. A costal spot is found on four-fifths opposite another on the middle of the termen and there is a dark-fuscous apical dot. The hindwings are grey.
