= Aproaerema coracina =

Scientific classification
- Domain: Eukaryota
- Kingdom: Animalia
- Phylum: Arthropoda
- Class: Insecta
- Order: Lepidoptera
- Family: Gelechiidae
- Genus: Aproaerema
- Species: A. coracina

Binomial name
- Aproaerema coracina (Meyrick, 1921)

Synonyms
- Stomopteryx coracina Meyrick, 1921

Species of moth

Aproaerema coracina is a moth of the family Gelechiidae. It was described by Edward Meyrick in 1921. It is found in Australia, where it has been recorded from Queensland.

The wingspan is about 9 mm. The forewings are dark bronzy fuscous with a minute whitish dot indicating the plical stigma, and one on the tornus. There is a slight white transverse mark on the costa at three-fourths. The hindwings are dark slaty grey.
