= Physoptila pinguivora =

Scientific classification
- Kingdom: Animalia
- Phylum: Arthropoda
- Class: Insecta
- Order: Lepidoptera
- Family: Gelechiidae
- Genus: Physoptila
- Species: P. pinguivora

Binomial name
- Physoptila pinguivora Meyrick, 1934

Species of moth

Physoptila pinguivora is a moth of the family Gelechiidae. It was described by Edward Meyrick in 1934. It is found on Java in Indonesia.

The larvae bore in the shoots of Planchonia valida.
