= Thriambeutis coryphaea =

Scientific classification
- Kingdom: Animalia
- Phylum: Arthropoda
- Class: Insecta
- Order: Lepidoptera
- Family: Heliodinidae
- Genus: Thriambeutis
- Species: T. coryphaea

Binomial name
- Thriambeutis coryphaea Meyrick, 1912

Species of moth

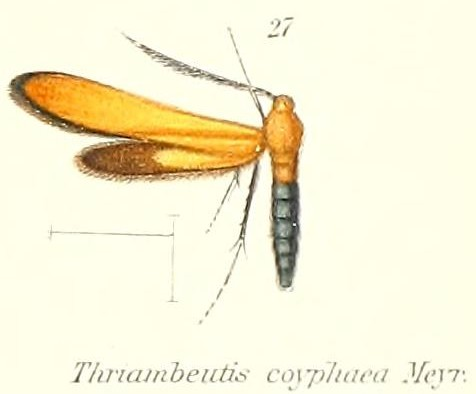
Thriambeutis coryphaea

Thriambeutis coryphaea is a species of moth of the family Heliodinidae.

== Distribution ==
This species is known from the Philippines (Mindoro).

It has a wingspan of 22 mm.
