= Potato moth (disambiguation) =

Potato moth may refer to:

- Stoeberhinus testaceus, potato moth, from the Pacific Islands
- Phthorimaea operculella, potato tuber moth, found worldwide
- Symmetrischema tangolias, Andean/South American potato tuber moth, from South America and introduced in North America, Australia and New Zealand
- Tecia solanivora, Guatemalan potato moth, found in South and Central America and introduced in the Canaries and Spain
- Agrotis bilitura, potato cutworm, found in South America
