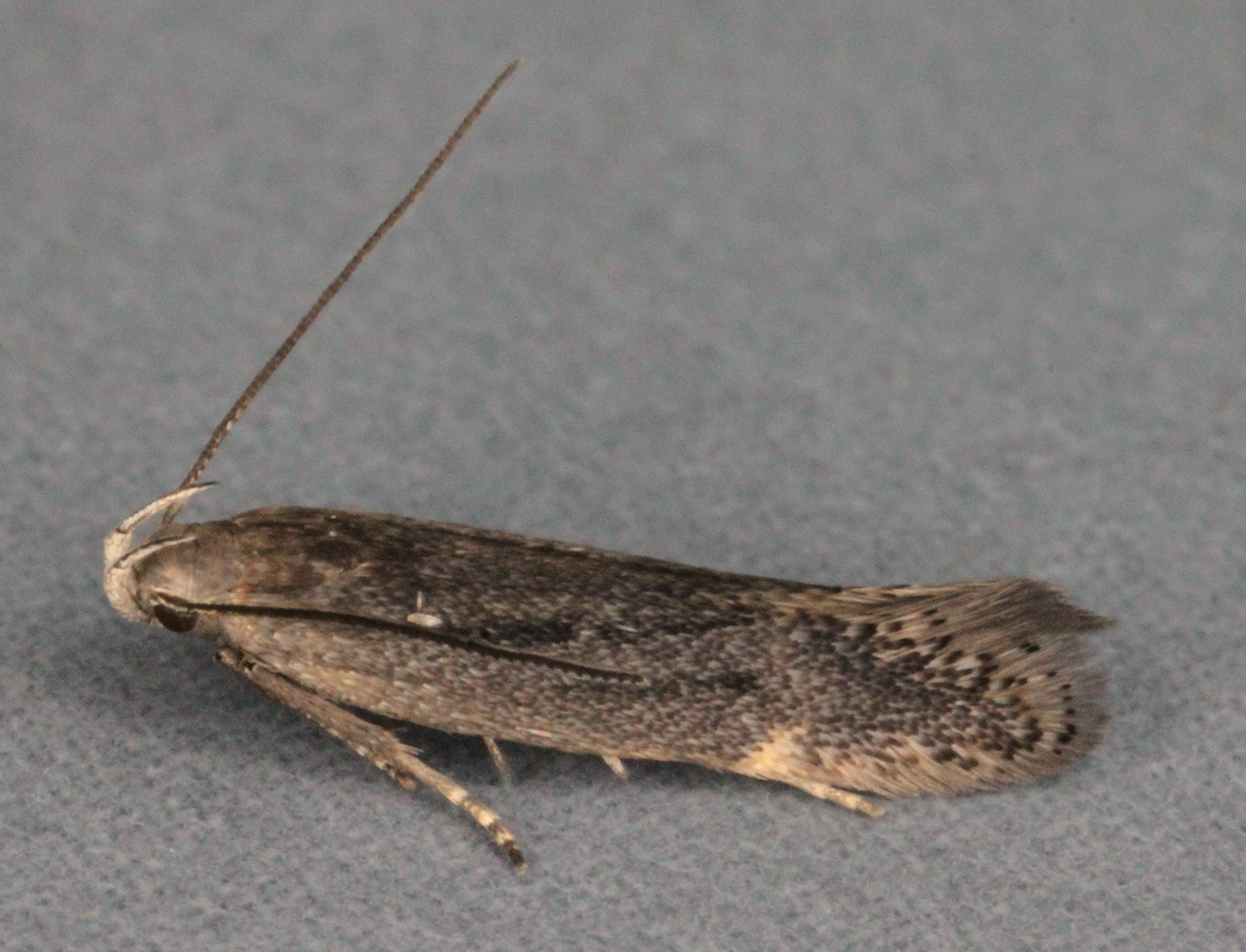
- Aproaerema anthyllidella Tolfannau, North Wales
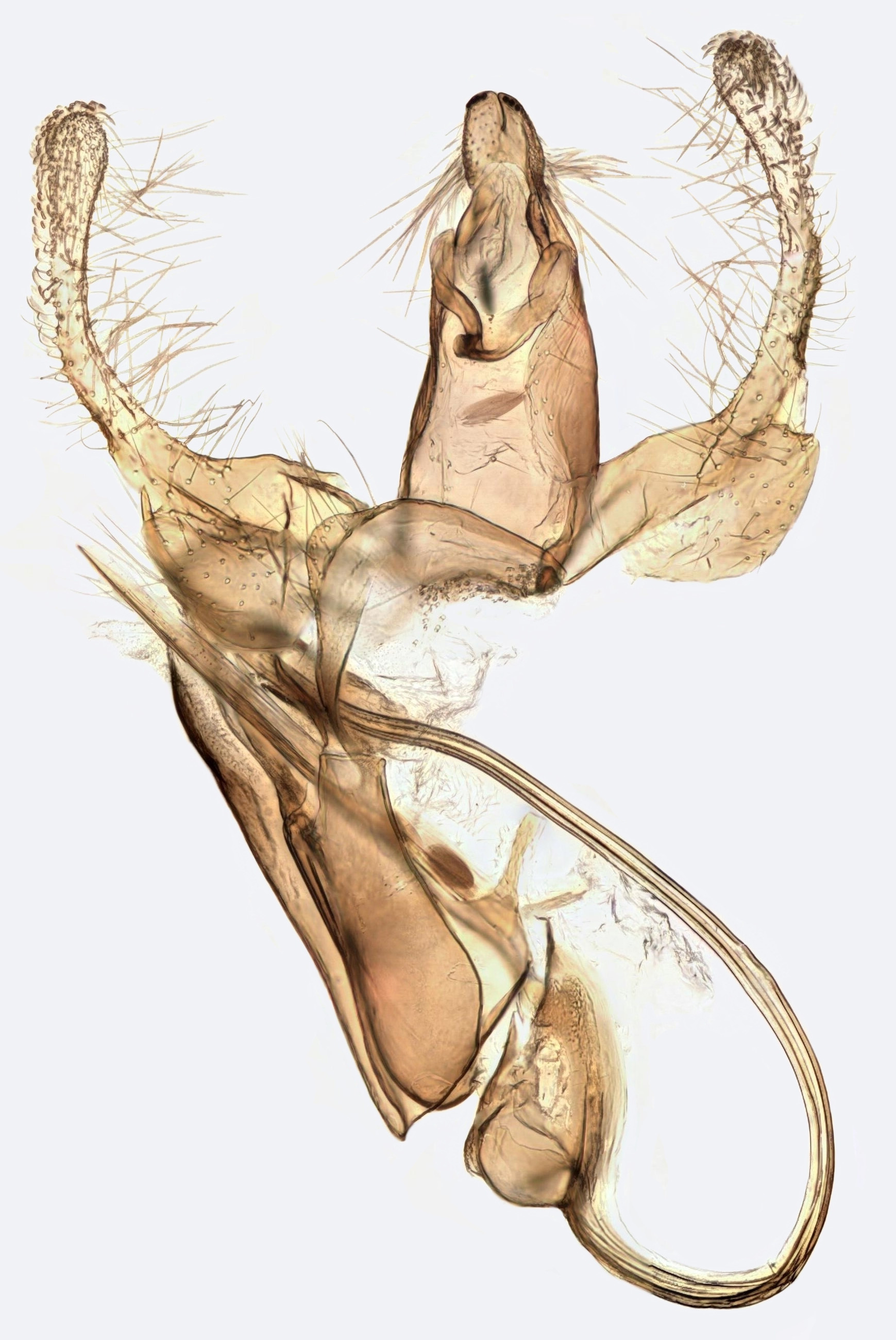
- Genitalia preparation

Scientific classification
- Kingdom: Animalia
- Phylum: Arthropoda
- Clade: Pancrustacea
- Class: Insecta
- Order: Lepidoptera
- Family: Gelechiidae
- Genus: Aproaerema
- Species: A. anthyllidella

Binomial name
- Aproaerema anthyllidella (Hübner, 1813)

Synonyms
- Tinea anthyllidella Hübner, 1813; Anacampsis anthyllidella; Gelechia nigritella Stainton, 1854; Gelechia (Anacampsis) sparsiciliella Barrett, 1891; Anacampsis infestella Rebel, 1896; Monochroa brundini Benander, 1945; Anacampsis alfalfella Amsel, 1958; Aproaerema aureliana Capuse, 1964; Gelechia psoralella Milliere, 1865; Aproaerema psoralella; Iwaruna psoralella; Gelechia elachistella Stainton, 1859

= Aproaerema anthyllidella =

Species of moth

Aproaerema anthyllidella is a moth of the family Gelechiidae. It is found in most of Europe, Kyrgyzstan, Iran and North America.

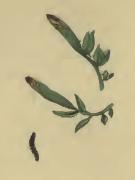
Leaves of Anthyllis vulneraria eaten and discoloured by larva

Larva

The wingspan is 10–12 mm. The forewings are dark slaty-fuscous, often paler-sprinkled, the stigmata hardly perceptible. The plical is followed by a whitish-ochreous dot, and there is a small whitish-ochreous triangular spot, usually somewhat outwardly oblique, on costa at 2/3, occasionally obsolete; often a very small whitish-ochreous spot on tornus opposite.Vein 6 arises out of vein 7. Hindwings are rather light grey. The larva is blackish-grey; on 2-4 dorsal line and segmental incisions obscurely whitish; spiracular series of whitish spots; head and plate of 2 black.

Adults are on wing from May to June and again from August to September in two generations per year.

The larvae feed on various herbaceous plants, including Anthyllis vulneraria, Chamaecytisus, Coronilla, Cytisus, Dorycnium rectum, Galega officinalis, Glycine max, Hymenocarpos circinnatus, Lathyrus pratensis, Lathyrus tuberosus, Lotus corniculatus, Medicago lupulina, Medicago sativa, Melilotus alba, Onobrychis viciifolia, Ononis repens, Ononis rosifolia, Ononis spinosa, Ornithopus, Oxytropis pilosa, Phaseolus vulgaris, Psoralea bituminosa, Trifolium pratense, Trifolium repens, Trigonella monspeliaca, Vicia cracca and Vicia faba. Larvae of the first generation mine the leaves of their host plant.

== Subspecies ==
  - Aproaerema anthyllidella anthylidella
  - Aproaerema anthyllidella elachistella (Stainton, 1859)
