= Percnarcha trabeata =

Scientific classification
- Domain: Eukaryota
- Kingdom: Animalia
- Phylum: Arthropoda
- Class: Insecta
- Order: Lepidoptera
- Family: Gelechiidae
- Genus: Percnarcha
- Species: P. trabeata

Binomial name
- Percnarcha trabeata (Meyrick, 1909)

Synonyms
- Tinaegeria trabeata Meyrick, 1909

Species of moth

Percnarcha trabeata is a moth in the family Gelechiidae. It was described by Edward Meyrick in 1909. It is found in Bolivia.
