= Aproaerema lerauti =

Scientific classification
- Domain: Eukaryota
- Kingdom: Animalia
- Phylum: Arthropoda
- Class: Insecta
- Order: Lepidoptera
- Family: Gelechiidae
- Genus: Aproaerema
- Species: A. lerauti

Binomial name
- Aproaerema lerauti Vives, 2001

Species of moth

Aproaerema lerauti is a moth of the family Gelechiidae. It is found in Spain and Portugal.
