= Bilobata =

Scientific classification
- Kingdom: Animalia
- Phylum: Arthropoda
- Clade: Pancrustacea
- Class: Insecta
- Order: Lepidoptera
- Family: Gelechiidae
- Subfamily: Gelechiinae
- Genus: Bilobata; Vári in Vári & Kroon, 1986

Type species
- Gelechia (Brachmia) subsecivella Zeller, 1852

Synonyms
- Biloba Janse, 1954 (preocc. Stach, 1951)

Genus of moths

Bilobata is a genus of moth in the family Gelechiidae.

== Species ==
- Bilobata argosticha (Janse, 1954)
- Bilobata subsecivella (Zeller, 1852)
- Bilobata torninotella (Janse, 1954)
