= Tecia confirmans =

Scientific classification
- Kingdom: Animalia
- Phylum: Arthropoda
- Clade: Pancrustacea
- Class: Insecta
- Order: Lepidoptera
- Family: Gelechiidae
- Genus: Tecia
- Species: T. confirmans

Binomial name
- Tecia confirmans (Povolný, 1990)

Synonyms
- Scrobischema confirmans Povolný, 1990

Species of moth

Tecia confirmans is a moth in the family Gelechiidae. It was described by Povolný in 1990. It is found in Bolivia.
