= Percnarcha latipes =

Scientific classification
- Kingdom: Animalia
- Phylum: Arthropoda
- Class: Insecta
- Order: Lepidoptera
- Family: Gelechiidae
- Genus: Percnarcha
- Species: P. latipes

Binomial name
- Percnarcha latipes (Walker, 1865)

Synonyms
- Tinaegeria latipes Walker, 1865; Snellenia latipes

Species of moth

Percnarcha latipes is a species of moth of the family Gelechiidae. It was described by Francis Walker in 1865. It is found in Brazil.
