= Aproaerema brevihamata =

Scientific classification
- Domain: Eukaryota
- Kingdom: Animalia
- Phylum: Arthropoda
- Class: Insecta
- Order: Lepidoptera
- Family: Gelechiidae
- Genus: Aproaerema
- Species: A. brevihamata

Binomial name
- Aproaerema brevihamata H.-H. Li, 1993

Species of moth

Aproaerema brevihamata is a moth of the family Gelechiidae. It was described by Hou-Hun Li in 1993. It is found in China.
