= Trichothyrsa taedifera =

Scientific classification
- Kingdom: Animalia
- Phylum: Arthropoda
- Class: Insecta
- Order: Lepidoptera
- Superfamily: Noctuoidea
- Family: Erebidae
- Genus: Trichothyrsa
- Species: T. taedifera

Binomial name
- Trichothyrsa taedifera Meyrick, 1912

Species of moth

Trichothyrsa taedifera is a moth of the family Heliodinidae first described by Edward Meyrick in 1912. It is found in Sri Lanka.
