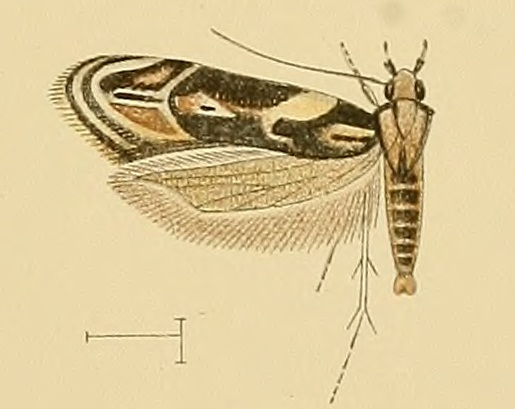

Scientific classification
- Domain: Eukaryota
- Kingdom: Animalia
- Phylum: Arthropoda
- Class: Insecta
- Order: Lepidoptera
- Family: Gelechiidae
- Genus: Aproaerema
- Species: A. mercedella

Binomial name
- Aproaerema mercedella Walsingham, 1908

= Aproaerema mercedella =

Species of moth

Aproaerema mercedella is a moth of the family Gelechiidae. It is found on the Canary Islands.

The wingspan is about 10 mm. The forewings are blackish, with pale yellow patches and lines. The hindwings are leaden grey.
