= Tecia albinervella =

Scientific classification
- Domain: Eukaryota
- Kingdom: Animalia
- Phylum: Arthropoda
- Class: Insecta
- Order: Lepidoptera
- Family: Gelechiidae
- Genus: Tecia
- Species: T. albinervella

Binomial name
- Tecia albinervella (Kieffer & Jörgensen, 1910)

Synonyms
- Fapua albinervella Kieffer & Jörgensen, 1910; Fapua albinervella Strand, 1911

Species of moth

Tecia albinervella is a moth in the family Gelechiidae. It was described by Kieffer and Jörgensen in 1910. It is found in Argentina.

The wingspan is 21.5–23 mm. The forewings are ochreous-yellow with white veins. The hindwings are grey-whitish.
