= Tecia subalbata =

Scientific classification
- Kingdom: Animalia
- Phylum: Arthropoda
- Class: Insecta
- Order: Lepidoptera
- Family: Gelechiidae
- Genus: Tecia
- Species: T. subalbata

Binomial name
- Tecia subalbata (Meyrick, 1931)

Synonyms
- Brachypsaltis subalbata Meyrick, 1931

Species of moth

Tecia subalbata is a moth in the family Gelechiidae. It was described by Edward Meyrick in 1931. It is found in Argentina.
