= Aproaerema isoscelixantha =

Scientific classification
- Domain: Eukaryota
- Kingdom: Animalia
- Phylum: Arthropoda
- Class: Insecta
- Order: Lepidoptera
- Family: Gelechiidae
- Genus: Aproaerema
- Species: A. isoscelixantha

Binomial name
- Aproaerema isoscelixantha (Lower, 1897)

Synonyms
- Gelechia isoscelixantha Lower, 1897

Species of moth

Aproaerema isoscelixantha is a moth of the family Gelechiidae. It was described by Oswald Bertram Lower in 1897. It is found in Australia, where it has been recorded from New South Wales.

The wingspan is about 10 mm. The forewings are black, with a yellow triangular spot on costa at five-sixths reaching nearly one-third across the wing. The hindwings are greyish-fuscous.
