= Trichothyrsa pyrrhocoma =

Scientific classification
- Kingdom: Animalia
- Phylum: Arthropoda
- Class: Insecta
- Order: Lepidoptera
- Superfamily: Noctuoidea
- Family: Erebidae
- Genus: Trichothyrsa
- Species: T. pyrrhocoma

Binomial name
- Trichothyrsa pyrrhocoma Meyrick, 1912

Species of moth

Trichothyrsa pyrrhocoma is a moth of the family Heliodinidae first described by Edward Meyrick in 1912. It is found in Sri Lanka.
