= Tecia kiefferi =

Scientific classification
- Domain: Eukaryota
- Kingdom: Animalia
- Phylum: Arthropoda
- Class: Insecta
- Order: Lepidoptera
- Family: Gelechiidae
- Genus: Tecia
- Species: T. kiefferi

Binomial name
- Tecia kiefferi Kieffer & Jörgensen, 1910

Synonyms
- Tecia (Lata) kiefferi Kieffer & Jörgensen, 1910; Tecia (Lata) kiefferi Strand, 1911

Species of moth

Tecia kiefferi is a moth in the family Gelechiidae. It was described by Kieffer and Jörgensen in 1910. It is found in Argentina.

The wingspan is about 26.5 mm. The forewings are ash-grey, sprinkled with black. The hindwings are dark grey.
