= Physoptila scenica =

Scientific classification
- Kingdom: Animalia
- Phylum: Arthropoda
- Class: Insecta
- Order: Lepidoptera
- Family: Gelechiidae
- Genus: Physoptila
- Species: P. scenica

Binomial name
- Physoptila scenica Meyrick, 1914

Species of moth

Physoptila scenica is a moth of the family Gelechiidae. It was described by Edward Meyrick in 1914. It is found in southern India.

The wingspan is 11–13 mm. The forewings are ochreous whitish with an irregular streak of yellow-ochreous suffusion along the fold throughout, and some irregular lighter patches on the dorsal area. The discal stigmata are indicated by undefined spots of yellow-ochreous suffusion, sometimes with a few black specks, the plical by a short fine linear mark of black scales, very obliquely before the first discal. There is a patch of raised (probably erectile) whitish scales beneath fold in the middle of the wing and a slightly projecting tuft of raised scales on the middle of the costa, preceded by a blackish dot, from about which proceed two very oblique obscure pale ochreous streaks running together into the apex. An irregular transverse brown blotch is found on the costa at two-thirds, reaching rather more than halfway across the wing, crossing these. The hindwings are grey, thinly scaled and subhyaline (almost glass like) in the disc and towards the base.

The larvae feed in the shoots of Careya arborea.
