= Tecia =

Scientific classification
- Domain: Eukaryota
- Kingdom: Animalia
- Phylum: Arthropoda
- Class: Insecta
- Order: Lepidoptera
- Family: Gelechiidae
- Subfamily: Gelechiinae
- Genus: Tecia; Kieffer & Jörgensen, 1910

Synonyms
- Fapua Kieffer & Jörgensen, 1910; Lata Kieffer & Jörgensen, 1910; Orsotricha Meyrick, 1914; Brachypsaltis Meyrick, 1931; Scrobischema Povolný, 1980

Genus of moths

Tecia is a genus of moths in the family Gelechiidae.

== Species ==
- Tecia albinervella (Kieffer & Jörgensen, 1910)
- Tecia confirmans (Povolný, 1990)
- Tecia kiefferi Kieffer & Jörgensen, 1910
- Tecia solanivora (Povolný, 1973)
- Tecia subalbata (Meyrick, 1931)
- Tecia venosa (Butler, 1883)
