= Thriambeutis hemicausta =

Scientific classification
- Kingdom: Animalia
- Phylum: Arthropoda
- Class: Insecta
- Order: Lepidoptera
- Family: Heliodinidae
- Genus: Thriambeutis
- Species: T. hemicausta

Binomial name
- Thriambeutis hemicausta Meyrick, 1910

Species of moth

Thriambeutis hemicausta is a species of moth of the family Heliodinidae. This species is known from the Solomons (Isabel island).

It has a wingspan of 21 mm. The forewings are reddish-orange with a purple-blackish apical patch occupying rather more than half the wing, the anterior edge irregular. The hindwings are reddish-orange with the apical half blackish, the division between these irregular.
