= Aproaerema africanella =

Scientific classification
- Domain: Eukaryota
- Kingdom: Animalia
- Phylum: Arthropoda
- Class: Insecta
- Order: Lepidoptera
- Family: Gelechiidae
- Genus: Aproaerema
- Species: A. africanella

Binomial name
- Aproaerema africanella (Janse, 1951)

Synonyms
- Schuetzeia africanella Janse, 1951

Species of moth

Aproaerema africanella is a moth of the family Gelechiidae. It was described by Anthonie Johannes Theodorus Janse in 1951. It is found in South Africa.
