= Aetole =

Aetole may refer to:

- Aetole (deity), an epithet of Artemis
- Aetole (moth), a genus of insects in the family Heliodinidae
