= Tecia venosa =

Scientific classification
- Domain: Eukaryota
- Kingdom: Animalia
- Phylum: Arthropoda
- Class: Insecta
- Order: Lepidoptera
- Family: Gelechiidae
- Genus: Tecia
- Species: T. venosa

Binomial name
- Tecia venosa (Butler, 1883)

Synonyms
- Topeutis venosa Butler, 1883; Tecia mendozella Kieffer & Jörgensen, 1910; Scrobipalpopsis (Scrobischema) vergarai Povolný, 1980; Tecia mendozella Strand, 1911; Holcocera baccharisella Brèthes, 1917

Species of moth

Tecia venosa is a moth in the family Gelechiidae. It was described by Arthur Gardiner Butler in 1883. It is found in Argentina, Chile and Colombia.

The larvae feed on Baccharis macrantha.
