= Percnarcha lilloi =

Scientific classification
- Domain: Eukaryota
- Kingdom: Animalia
- Phylum: Arthropoda
- Class: Insecta
- Order: Lepidoptera
- Family: Gelechiidae
- Genus: Percnarcha
- Species: P. lilloi

Binomial name
- Percnarcha lilloi (Köhler, 1941)

Synonyms
- Gaea lilloi Köhler, 1941

Species of moth

Percnarcha lilloi is a moth in the family Gelechiidae. It was described by Paul Köhler in 1941. It is found in Tucumán Province, Argentina.
