= Bilobata torninotella =

Scientific classification
- Domain: Eukaryota
- Kingdom: Animalia
- Phylum: Arthropoda
- Class: Insecta
- Order: Lepidoptera
- Family: Gelechiidae
- Genus: Bilobata
- Species: B. torninotella

Binomial name
- Bilobata torninotella (Janse, 1954)

Synonyms
- Biloba torninotella Janse, 1954

Species of moth

Bilobata torninotella is a moth in the family Gelechiidae. It was described by Anthonie Johannes Theodorus Janse in 1954. It is found in South Africa.

The wingspan is about 10 mm. The hindwings are deep grey.
