= Bilobata argosticha =

Scientific classification
- Domain: Eukaryota
- Kingdom: Animalia
- Phylum: Arthropoda
- Class: Insecta
- Order: Lepidoptera
- Family: Gelechiidae
- Genus: Bilobata
- Species: B. argosticha

Binomial name
- Bilobata argosticha (Janse, 1954)

Synonyms
- Biloba argosticha Janse, 1954

Species of moth

Bilobata argosticha is a moth in the family Gelechiidae. It was described by South African entomologist Anthonie Johannes Theodorus Janse in 1954. It is found in Namibia.
