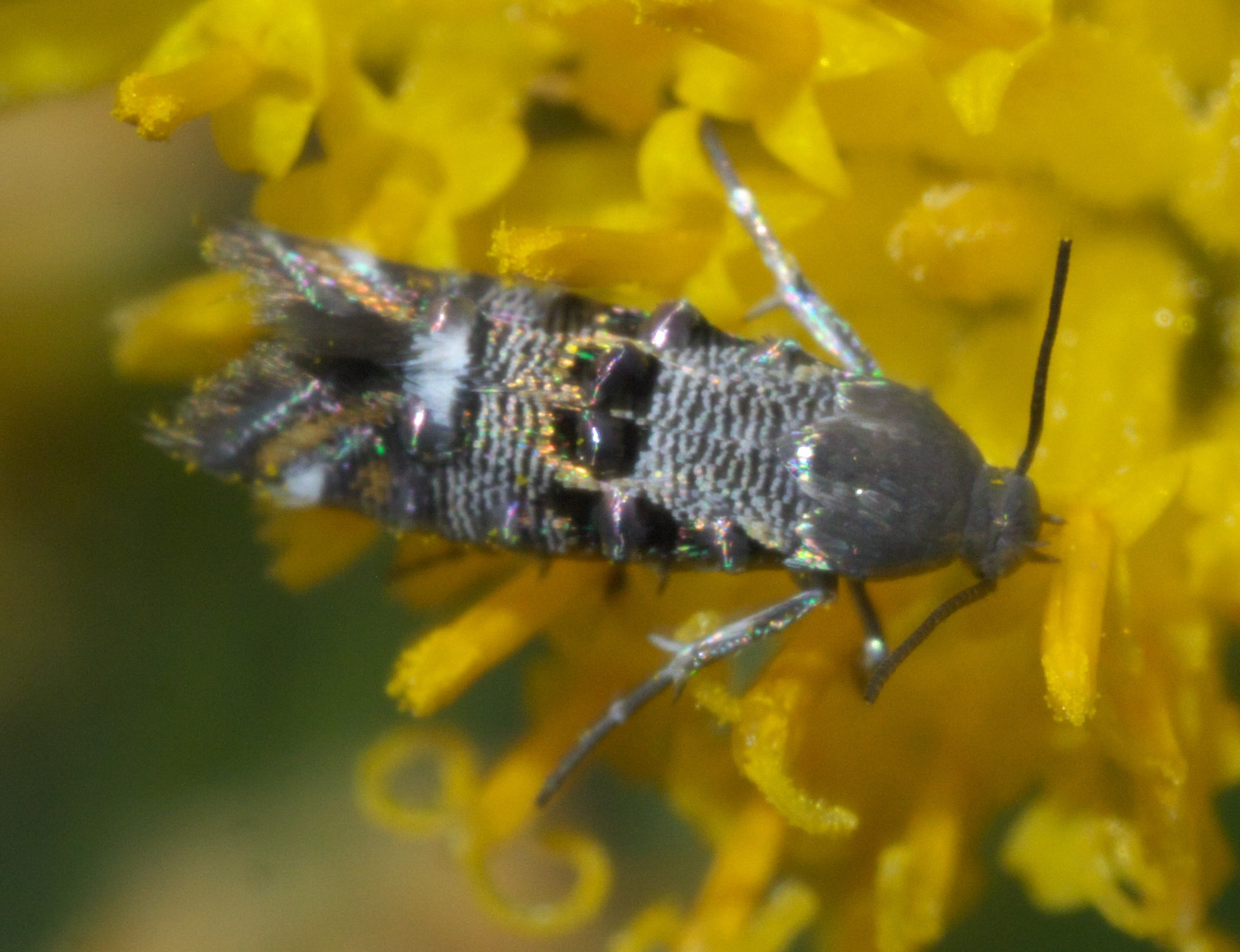

Scientific classification
- Kingdom: Animalia
- Phylum: Arthropoda
- Clade: Pancrustacea
- Class: Insecta
- Order: Lepidoptera
- Family: Heliodinidae
- Genus: Lithariapteryx
- Species: L. abroniaeella

Binomial name
- Lithariapteryx abroniaeella Chambers, 1876

= Lithariapteryx abroniaeella =

Species of moth

Lithariapteryx abroniaeella is a species of sun moth in the family Heliodinidae.

The MONA or Hodges number for Lithariapteryx abroniaeella is 2510.

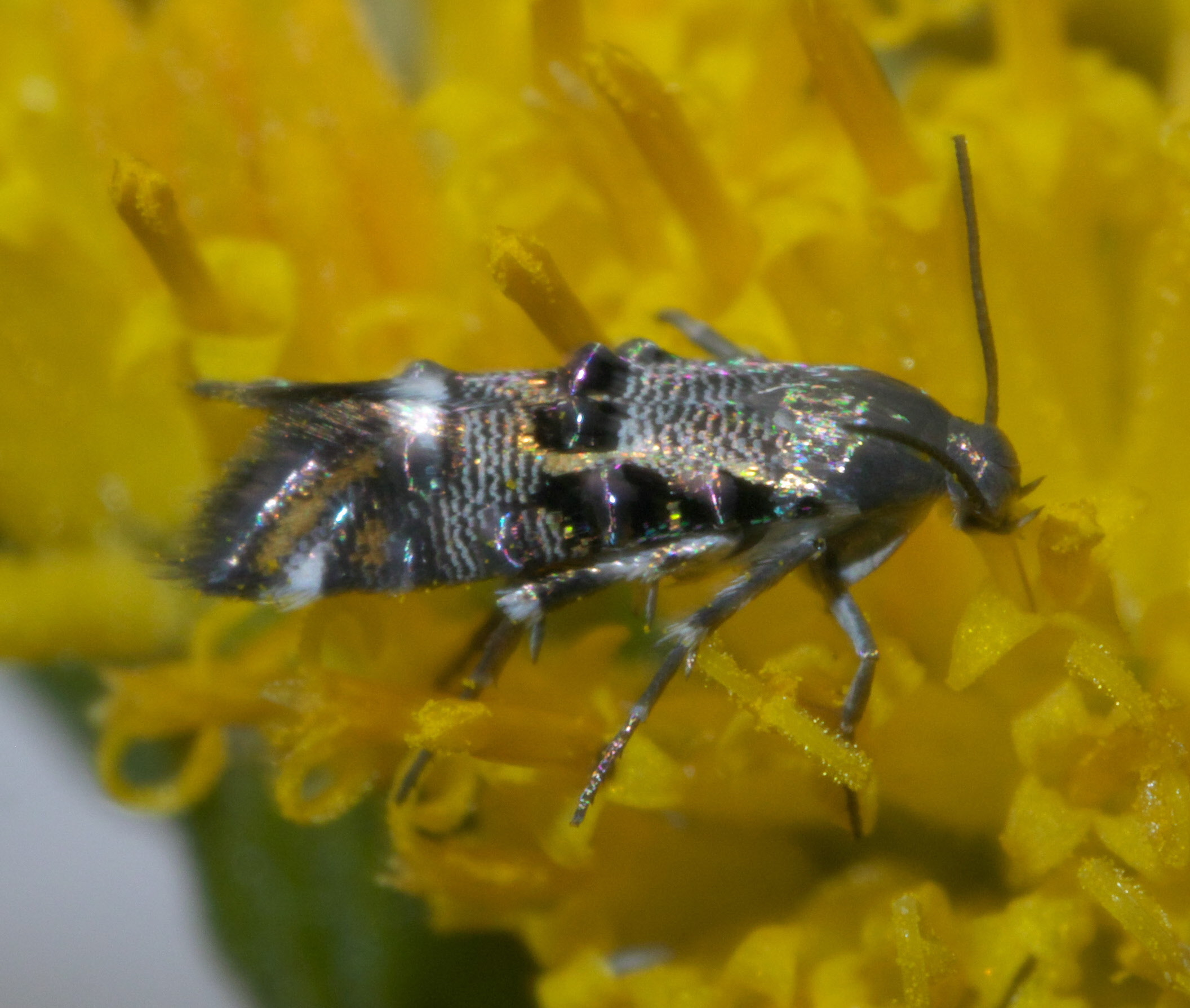
