= Paraschema =

Scientific classification
- Kingdom: Animalia
- Phylum: Arthropoda
- Clade: Pancrustacea
- Class: Insecta
- Order: Lepidoptera
- Family: Gelechiidae
- Genus: Paraschema; Povolný, 1990
- Species: P. detectendum

Binomial name
- Paraschema detectendum Povolný, 1990

Genus of moths

Paraschema is a genus of moth in the family Gelechiidae. It contains the species Paraschema detectendum, which is found in Bolivia.
