= Percnarcha =

Scientific classification
- Kingdom: Animalia
- Phylum: Arthropoda
- Clade: Pancrustacea
- Class: Insecta
- Order: Lepidoptera
- Family: Gelechiidae
- Subfamily: Gelechiinae
- Genus: Percnarcha; Meyrick, 1915

Genus of moths

Percnarcha is a genus of moths in the family Gelechiidae.

== Species ==
- Percnarcha claudiadoblesae Metz,2020 (from Costa Rica)
- Percnarcha latipes (Walker, [1865]) (from Para, Brazil)
- Percnarcha lilloi (Köhler, 1941)
- Percnarcha strategica Meyrick, 1930 (from Para, Brazil)
- Percnarcha trabeata (Meyrick, 1909) (from Bolivia)
