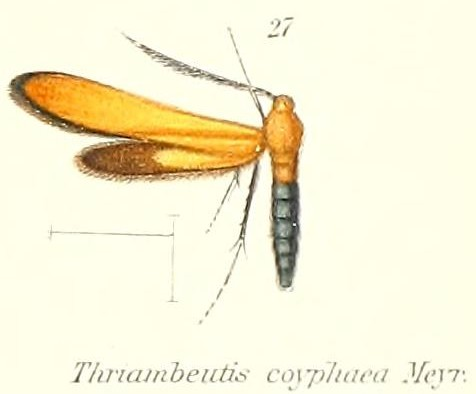
- Thriambeutis coriphaea

Scientific classification
- Kingdom: Animalia
- Phylum: Arthropoda
- Class: Insecta
- Order: Lepidoptera
- Family: Heliodinidae
- Genus: Thriambeutis; Meyrick, 1910

= Thriambeutis =

Genus of moths

Thriambeutis is a genus of moths of the Heliodinidae family.

== Species ==
- Thriambeutis coryphaea Meyrick 1912 (from the Philippines)
- Thriambeutis deuterarcha Meyrick 1938
- Thriambeutis hemicausta Meyrick 1910 (from the Solomon Islands)
- Thriambeutis melanocephala Diakonoff 1948
