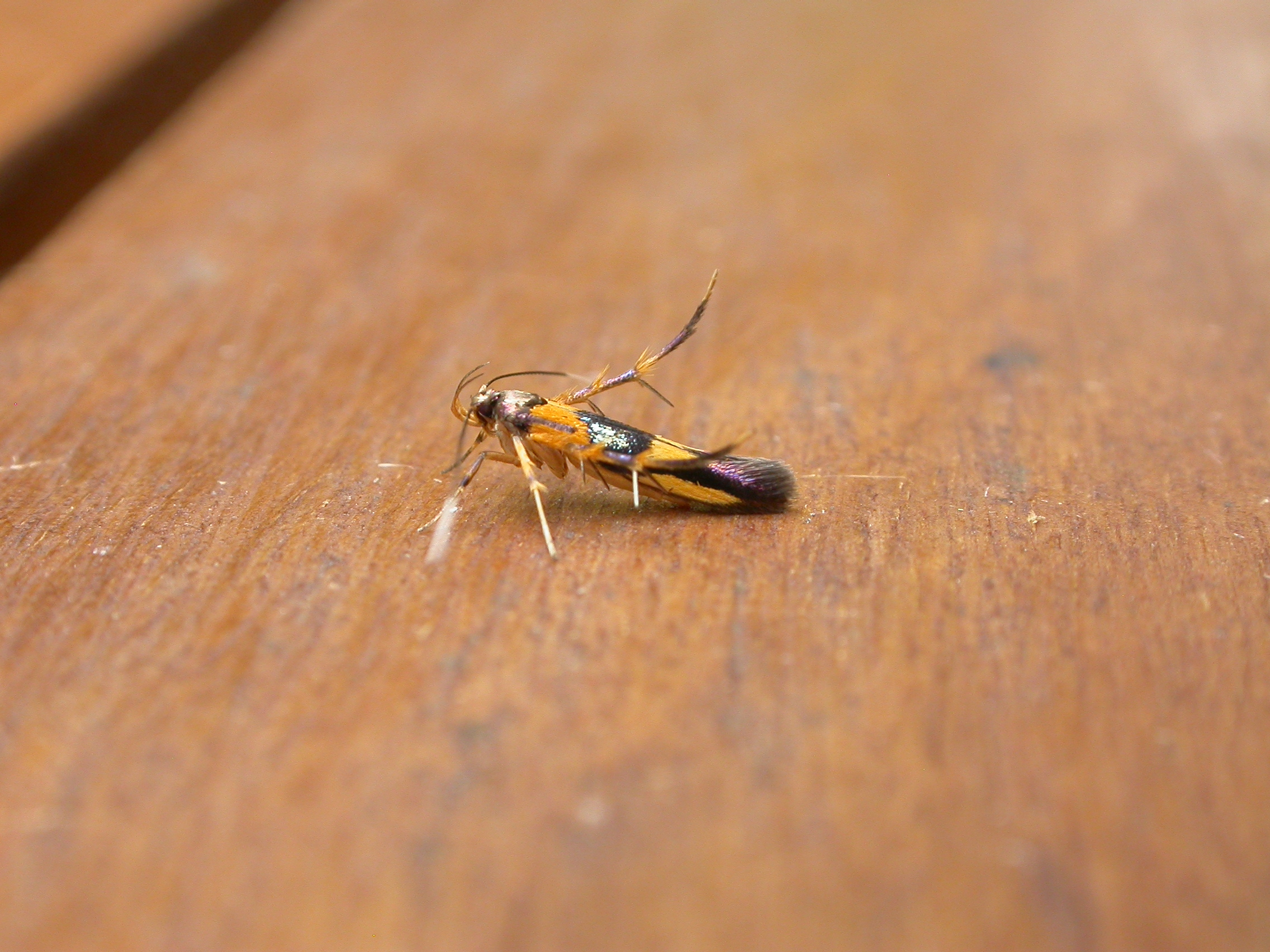
- Xestocasis balanochrysa

Scientific classification
- Kingdom: Animalia
- Phylum: Arthropoda
- Clade: Pancrustacea
- Class: Insecta
- Order: Lepidoptera
- Family: Oecophoridae
- Genus: Xestocasis; Meyrick, 1914

= Xestocasis =

Genus of moths

Xestocasis is a moth genus of the superfamily Gelechioidea. It was described in the family Heliodinidae and is sometimes also listed in the Cosmopterigidae, but actually seems to belong in the Oecophoridae (possibly in the subfamily Stathmopodinae).

== Species ==
- Xestocasis antirrhopa Diakonoff, 1955
- Xestocasis balanochrysa Meyrick, 1915
- Xestocasis colometra Meyrick, 1915
- Xestocasis erymnota Meyrick, 1917
- Xestocasis hololampra Meyrick, 1915
- Xestocasis iostrota (Meyrick, 1910)
- Xestocasis lauta (Meyrick, 1921)
- Xestocasis tetraconcha Meyrick, 1917

== Former species ==
- Xestocasis crocodelta Meyrick, 1915
