= Physoptilinae =

Scientific classification
- Kingdom: Animalia
- Phylum: Arthropoda
- Clade: Pancrustacea
- Class: Insecta
- Order: Lepidoptera
- Family: Gelechiidae
- Subfamily: Physoptilinae; Meyrick, 1914

Synonyms
- Pleurotinae Toll, 1956

Subfamily of moths

Physoptilinae is a subfamily of moths in the family Gelechiidae.

== Taxonomy and systematics ==
- Physoptila Meyrick, 1914
