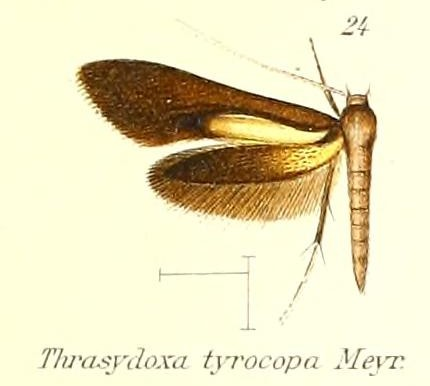

Scientific classification
- Kingdom: Animalia
- Phylum: Arthropoda
- Clade: Pancrustacea
- Class: Insecta
- Order: Lepidoptera
- Family: Heliodinidae
- Genus: Thrasydoxa; Meyrick, 1912
- Species: T. tyrocopa

Binomial name
- Thrasydoxa tyrocopa Meyrick, 1912

= Thrasydoxa =

Genus of moths

Thrasydoxa is a genus of moths of the family Heliodinidae. There is only one species in this genus: Thrasydoxa tyrocopa Meyrick, 1912 that is found in Colombia.

This species has a wingspan of 17 mm and the type provided from an altitude of 1800 m in San Antonio, Tolima, Colombia.
