= Pteropygme =

Scientific classification
- Kingdom: Animalia
- Phylum: Arthropoda
- Class: Insecta
- Order: Lepidoptera
- Family: Heliodinidae
- Genus: Pteropygme; Speiser, 1902
- Species: P. pyrrha

Binomial name
- Pteropygme pyrrha (Pagenstecher, 1900)

Synonyms
- Synaphia Pagenstecher, 1900; Synaphia pyrrha Pagenstecher, 1900; Persicoptila pyrrha

Genus of moths

Pteropygme is a genus of moths of the family Heliodinidae. It contains only one species, Pteropygme pyrrha, which is found on the Bismarck Archipelago.
