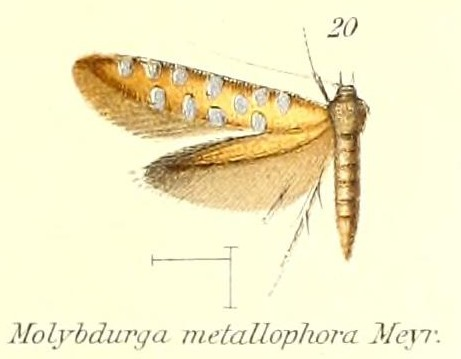

Scientific classification
- Kingdom: Animalia
- Phylum: Arthropoda
- Class: Insecta
- Order: Lepidoptera
- Family: Heliodinidae
- Genus: Molybdurga; Meyrick, 1897
- Species: M. metallophora

Binomial name
- Molybdurga metallophora Meyrick, 1897

= Molybdurga =

Genus of moths

Molybdurga is a genus of moths of the family Heliodinidae. There is only one species in this genus: Molybdurga metallophora Meyrick, 1897 that is found in Australia.
