= Stenoalata =

Scientific classification
- Kingdom: Animalia
- Phylum: Arthropoda
- Class: Insecta
- Order: Lepidoptera
- Family: Gelechiidae
- Genus: Stenoalata; Omelko in Omelko & Omelko, 1998
- Species: S. macra

Binomial name
- Stenoalata macra Omelko, 1998

Genus of moths

Stenoalata is a genus of moths in the family Gelechiidae. It contains the species Stenoalata macra, which is found in the Russian Far East (Primorskii krai).
