= Pseudosymmoca =

Scientific classification
- Kingdom: Animalia
- Phylum: Arthropoda
- Class: Insecta
- Order: Lepidoptera
- Family: Gelechiidae
- Genus: Pseudosymmoca; Rebel, 1903
- Species: P. angustipennis

Binomial name
- Pseudosymmoca angustipennis Rebel, 1903

Genus of moths

Pseudosymmoca is a genus of moth in the family Gelechiidae. It contains the species Pseudosymmoca angustipennis, which is found in the Sahara.
