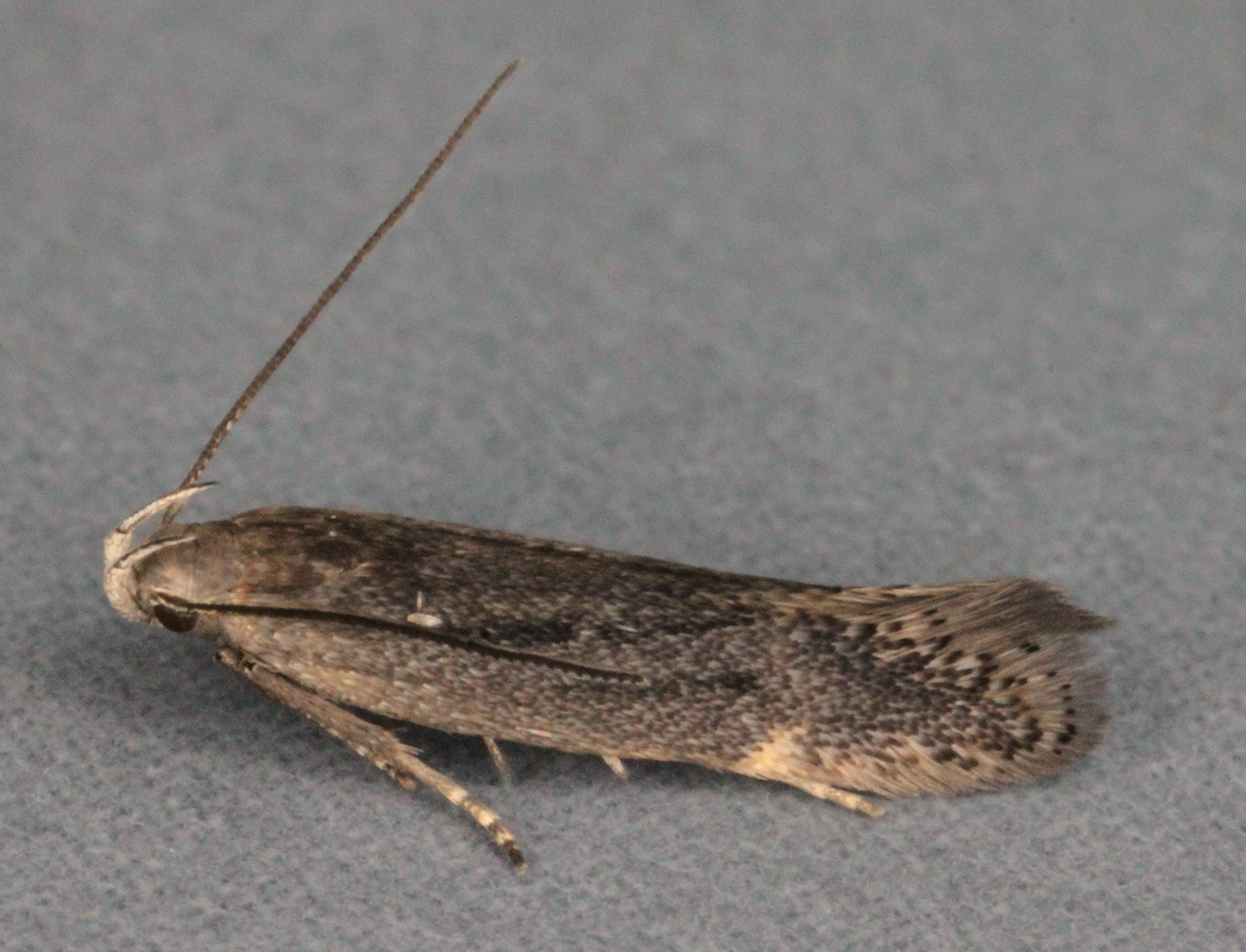
- Aproaerema anthyllidella Tonfanau, North Wales

Scientific classification
- Domain: Eukaryota
- Kingdom: Animalia
- Phylum: Arthropoda
- Class: Insecta
- Order: Lepidoptera
- Family: Gelechiidae
- Tribe: Anacampsini
- Genus: Aproaerema; Durrant 1897

Synonyms
- Schuetzeia Spuler, 1910

= Aproaerema =

Genus of moths

Aproaerema is a genus of moths in the family Gelechiidae.

== Species ==
- Aproaerema africanella (Janse, 1951)
- Aproaerema anthyllidella (Hübner, 1813)
- Aproaerema brevihamata Li, 1993
- Aproaerema coracina (Meyrick, 1921)
- Aproaerema isoscelixantha (Lower, 1897)
- Aproaerema lerauti Vives, 2001
- Aproaerema longihamata Li, 1993
- Aproaerema mercedella Walsingham, 1908
- Aproaerema modicella (Deventer, 1904)
- Aproaerema simplexella (Walker, 1864)
