= Placoptila artionoma =

Scientific classification
- Kingdom: Animalia
- Phylum: Arthropoda
- Class: Insecta
- Order: Lepidoptera
- Family: Cosmopterigidae
- Genus: Placoptila
- Species: P. artionoma

Binomial name
- Placoptila artionoma Meyrick, 1919

Species of moth

Placoptila artionoma is a moth in the family Cosmopterigidae. It is found in New Guinea.
