= Haemangela =

Scientific classification
- Kingdom: Animalia
- Phylum: Arthropoda
- Clade: Pancrustacea
- Class: Insecta
- Order: Lepidoptera
- Family: Heliodinidae
- Genus: Haemangela; Meyrick, 1936
- Species: H. vindicatrix

Binomial name
- Haemangela vindicatrix Meyrick, 1936

Genus of moths

Haemangela is a genus of moths of the family Heliodinidae. It contains only one species, Haemangela vindicatrix, which is found on the Solomon Islands.
