= Craterobathra =

Scientific classification
- Kingdom: Animalia
- Phylum: Arthropoda
- Clade: Pancrustacea
- Class: Insecta
- Order: Lepidoptera
- Family: Heliodinidae
- Genus: Craterobathra; Meyrick, 1927

Genus of moths

Craterobathra is a moth genus of in the family Heliodinidae.

== Species ==
- Craterobathra argyracma Diakonoff, 1968
- Craterobathra demarcata Diakonoff, 1968
- Craterobathra ornata Diakonoff, 1968
- Craterobathra tabellifera Meyrick, 1927
