= Placoptila cyclas =

Scientific classification
- Kingdom: Animalia
- Phylum: Arthropoda
- Class: Insecta
- Order: Lepidoptera
- Family: Cosmopterigidae
- Genus: Placoptila
- Species: P. cyclas

Binomial name
- Placoptila cyclas Meyrick, 1937

Species of moth

Placoptila cyclas is a moth in the family Cosmopterigidae. It is found in India.
