= Capanica =

Scientific classification
- Kingdom: Animalia
- Phylum: Arthropoda
- Clade: Pancrustacea
- Class: Insecta
- Order: Lepidoptera
- Family: Heliodinidae
- Genus: Capanica; Meyrick, 1917

Genus of moths

Capanica is a moth genus of in the family Heliodinidae.

== Species ==
- Capanica astrophanes Meyrick, 1917
- Capanica lamprolitha Meyrick, 1917
