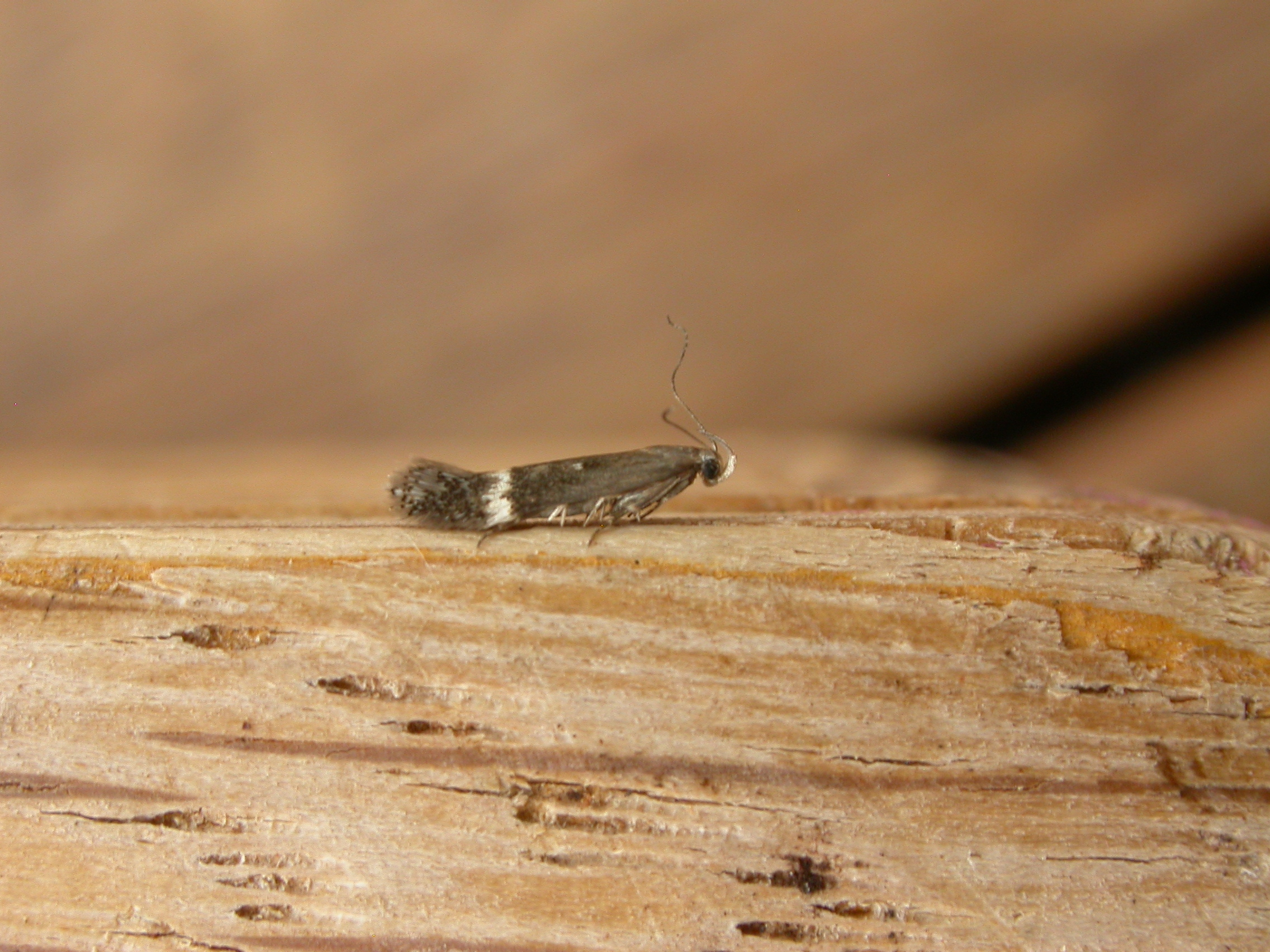

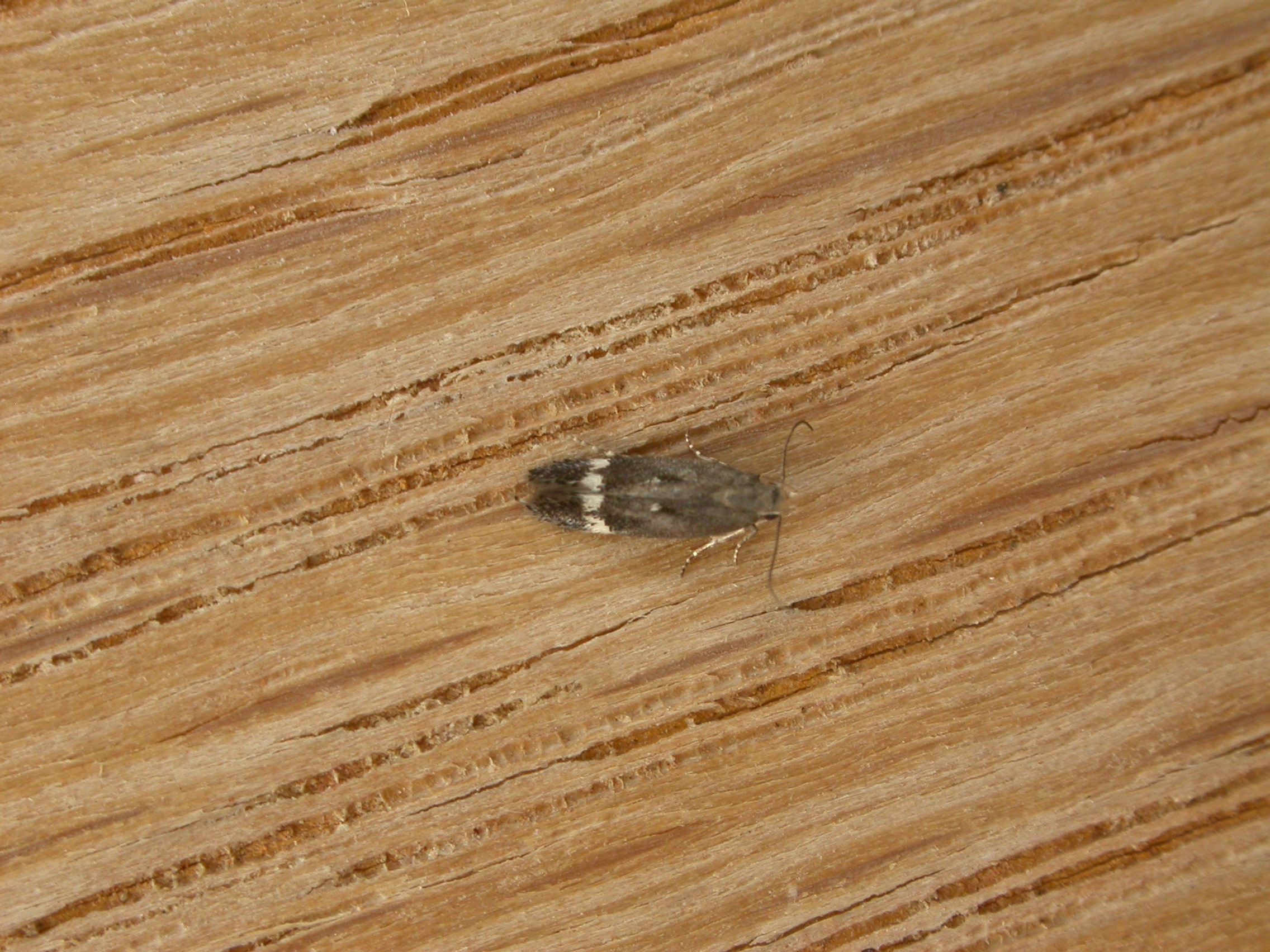

Scientific classification
- Kingdom: Animalia
- Phylum: Arthropoda
- Class: Insecta
- Order: Lepidoptera
- Family: Gelechiidae
- Genus: Aproaerema
- Species: A. simplexella

Binomial name
- Aproaerema simplexella (Walker, 1864)

Synonyms
- Gelechia simplexella Walker, 1864; Anacampsis simplicella Meyrick, 1904; Anacampsis simplexella

= Aproaerema simplexella =

Species of moth

Aproaerema simplexella, the soybean moth, is a moth in the family Gelechiidae. It was described by Francis Walker in 1864. It is found in India, China, Australia (Western Australia, the Northern Territory, Queensland, New South Wales, Victoria, Tasmania, South Australia), Norfolk Island and New Zealand. It is an invasive species in Africa, where it has since been recorded from the Democratic Republic of the Congo, Malawi, South Africa and Uganda.

The wingspan is 9–12 mm. The forewings are rather dark bronzy fuscous with an elongate dark fuscous mark on the fold before the middle, sometimes interrupted by a ferruginous-ochreous dot, sometimes followed by some whitish scales. There is sometimes an indistinct dark fuscous discal dot in the middle and a small whitish spot on the tornus, and a larger clear white subtriangular spot on the costa opposite, almost meeting. The hindwings are grey, darker posteriorly.
