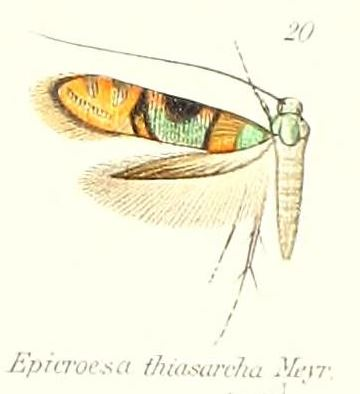
- Illustration of Epicroesa thiasarcha

Scientific classification
- Kingdom: Animalia
- Phylum: Arthropoda
- Clade: Pancrustacea
- Class: Insecta
- Order: Lepidoptera
- Family: Heliodinidae
- Genus: Epicroesa; Meyrick, 1907

Species
- 6 (see text)

= Epicroesa =

Genus of moths

Epicroesa is a genus of sun moths that belongs to the family Heliodinidae. Unlike other moth genera in its family, this genus is only found in the Old World. Its range includes Australia, New Guinea, Tahiti, Taiwan and Japan.

== Taxonomy ==
The genus was described in 1907 by Edward Meyrick, a British entomologist who is considered to be an expert on the systematics of microlepidopterans.

=== Species ===
This genus currently contains 6 described species. They are listed below:

- Epicroesa ambrosia Meyrick, 1907
- Epicroesa calliteucha Meyrick, 1912
- Epicroesa chromatorhoea Diakonoff & Arita, 1979
- Epicroesa lylae Heppner, 2021
- Epicroesa metallifera Meyrick, 1907
- Epicroesa thiasarca Meyrick, 1907
