= Antithyra =

Scientific classification
- Kingdom: Animalia
- Phylum: Arthropoda
- Class: Insecta
- Order: Lepidoptera
- Family: Gelechiidae
- Genus: Antithyra; Meyrick, 1906
- Species: A. vineata

Binomial name
- Antithyra vineata Meyrick, 1906

Genus of moths

Antithyra is a genus of moth in the family Gelechiidae. It contains the species Antithyra vineata, which is found in Sri Lanka.

The wingspan is 11–12 mm (0.43–0.47 in). The forewings are light ochreous-yellow, irregularly chequered throughout with undefined grey spots irrorated (speckled) with black. The hindwings are dark grey.

The larvae feed on minute lichens and algae on the stems of various trees. At first in an hourglass-shaped case, but later constructing a supplementary tube extending in a straight line in both directions, with lateral triangular pointed projections disposed alternately at equal distances, all concealing valves through which the larva can protrude its head for feeding or observation. If disturbed at one point, it re-appears at another. The entire case is temporarily anchored at either end to the bark. When food is exhausted at one spot, the strands are severed and the case shifted to another situation. Pupation takes place in the centre, beneath the median pad.
