= Placoptila cyanolychna =

Scientific classification
- Kingdom: Animalia
- Phylum: Arthropoda
- Class: Insecta
- Order: Lepidoptera
- Family: Cosmopterigidae
- Genus: Placoptila
- Species: P. cyanolychna

Binomial name
- Placoptila cyanolychna Meyrick, 1910

Species of moth

Placoptila cyanolychna is a moth in the family Cosmopterigidae. It is found on Borneo.
