= Metopios =

Scientific classification
- Kingdom: Animalia
- Phylum: Arthropoda
- Class: Insecta
- Order: Lepidoptera
- Family: Gelechiidae
- Genus: Metopios; Lucas, 1945
- Species: M. tozeurellum

Binomial name
- Metopios tozeurellum Lucas, 1945

Genus of moths

Metopios is a genus of moth in the family Gelechiidae. It contains the species Metopios tozeurellum, which is found in North Africa.
