= Xestocasis colometra =

Scientific classification
- Kingdom: Animalia
- Phylum: Arthropoda
- Class: Insecta
- Order: Lepidoptera
- Family: Oecophoridae
- Genus: Xestocasis
- Species: X. colometra

Binomial name
- Xestocasis colometra Meyrick, 1915

Synonyms
- Limnaecia colometra

Species of moth

Xestocasis colometra is a moth in the family Oecophoridae described by Edward Meyrick in 1915. It is found in Australia, where it has been recorded from Queensland.
