= Ethirastis =

Scientific classification
- Kingdom: Animalia
- Phylum: Arthropoda
- Class: Insecta
- Order: Lepidoptera
- Family: Heliodinidae
- Genus: Ethirastis; Meyrick, 1921
- Species: E. sideraula

Binomial name
- Ethirastis sideraula (Meyrick, 1915)

Synonyms
- Pyroderces sideraula Meyrick, 1915

Genus of moths

Ethirastis is a genus of moths of the family Heliodinidae. It contains only one species, Ethirastis sideraula, which is found in Australia.
