= Placoptila electrica =

Scientific classification
- Kingdom: Animalia
- Phylum: Arthropoda
- Class: Insecta
- Order: Lepidoptera
- Family: Cosmopterigidae
- Genus: Placoptila
- Species: P. electrica

Binomial name
- Placoptila electrica Meyrick, 1894

Species of moth

Placoptila electrica is a moth in the family Cosmopterigidae. It is found in India.
