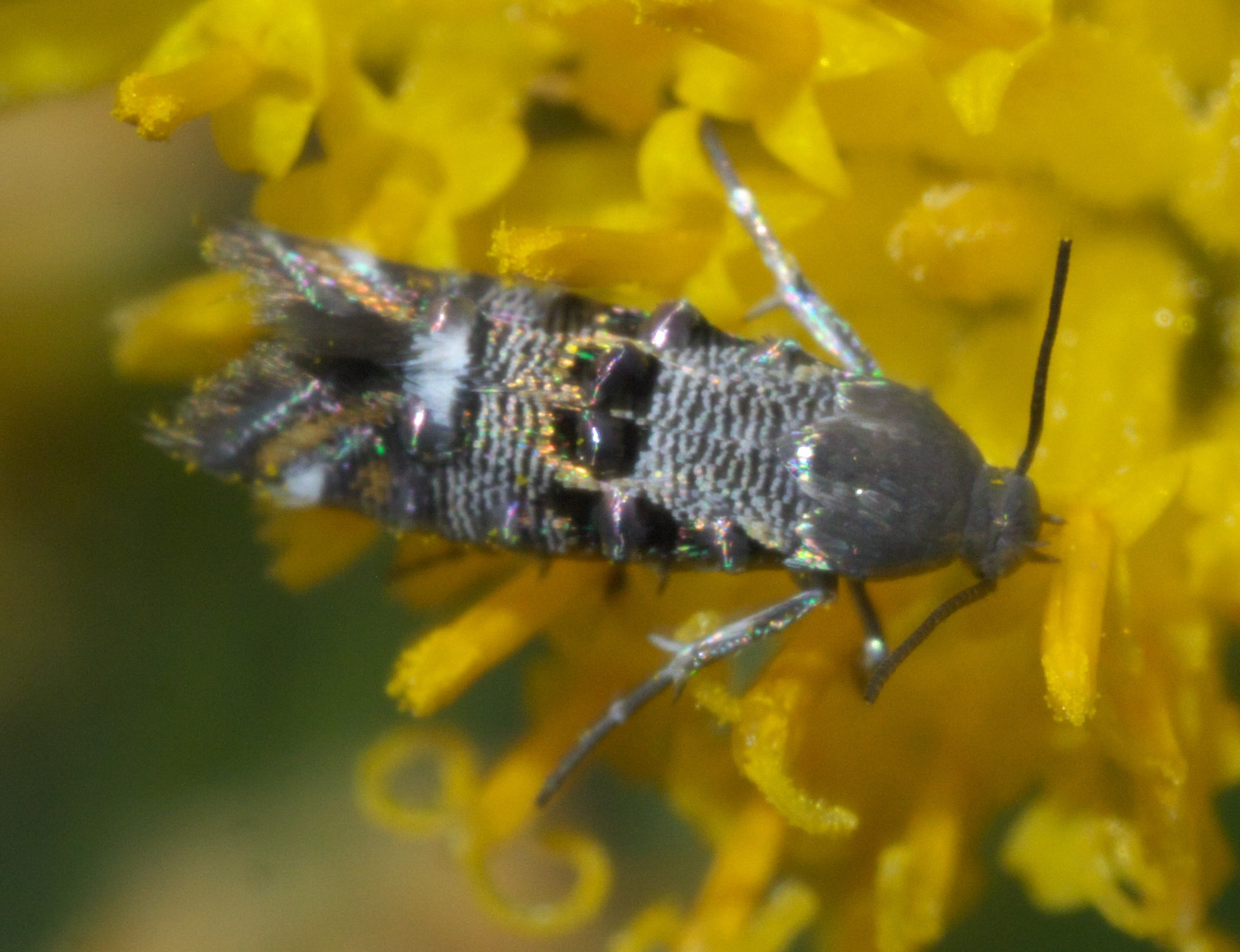
- Lithariapteryx abroniaeella

Scientific classification
- Kingdom: Animalia
- Phylum: Arthropoda
- Clade: Pancrustacea
- Class: Insecta
- Order: Lepidoptera
- Family: Heliodinidae
- Genus: Lithariapteryx; Chambers, 1876

= Lithariapteryx =

Genus of moths

Lithariapteryx is a genus of sun moths in the family Heliodinidae. There are at least four described species in Lithariapteryx.

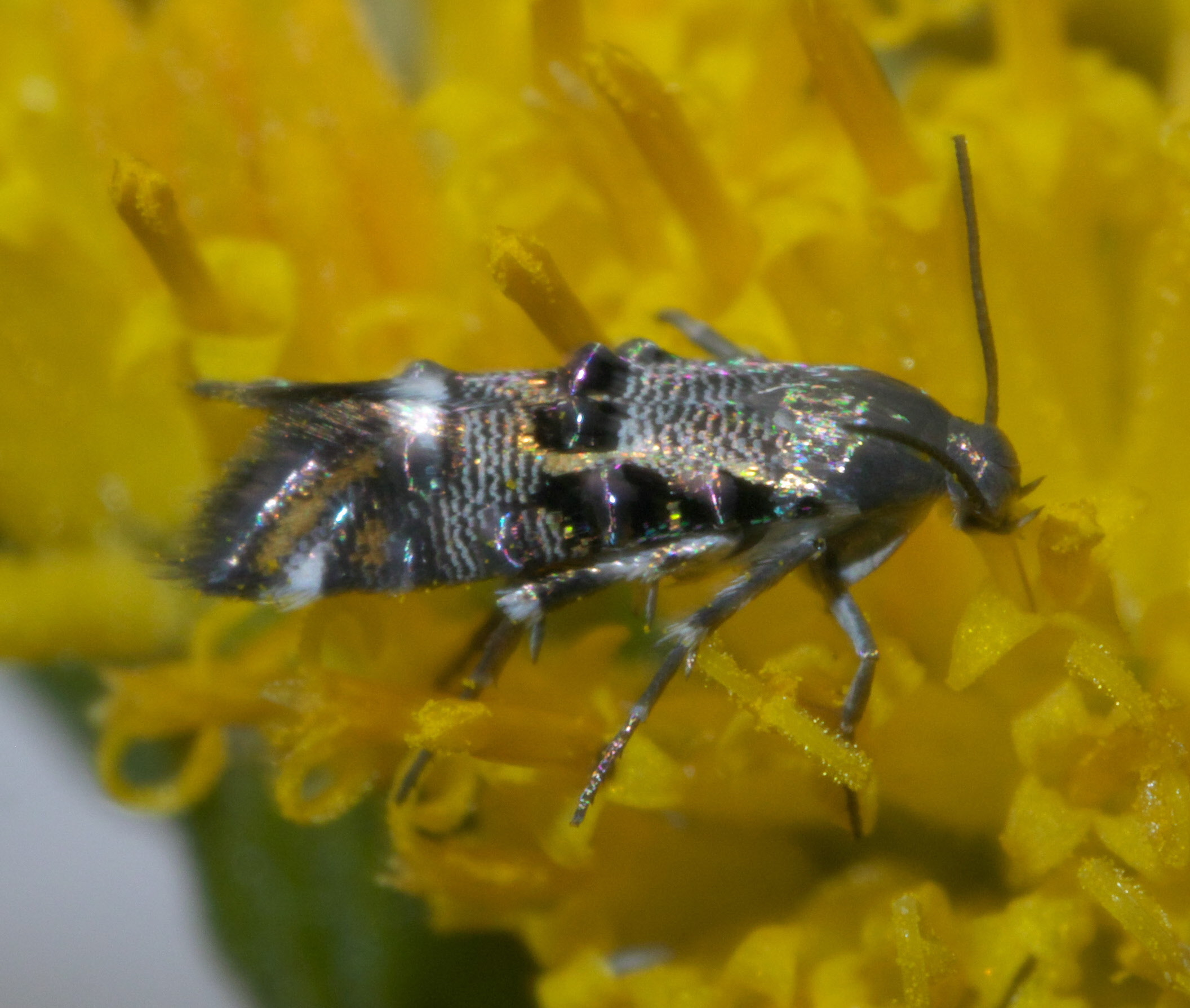
Lithariapteryx abroniaeella

== Species ==
These four species belong to the genus Lithariapteryx:

- Lithariapteryx abroniaeella Chambers, 1876^{c g b}
- Lithariapteryx elegans Powell, 1991^{b}
- Lithariapteryx jubarella Comstock, 1940^{c g b}
- Lithariapteryx mirabilinella Comstock, 1940^{c g b}

Data sources: i = ITIS, c = Catalogue of Life, g = GBIF, b = Bugguide.net
