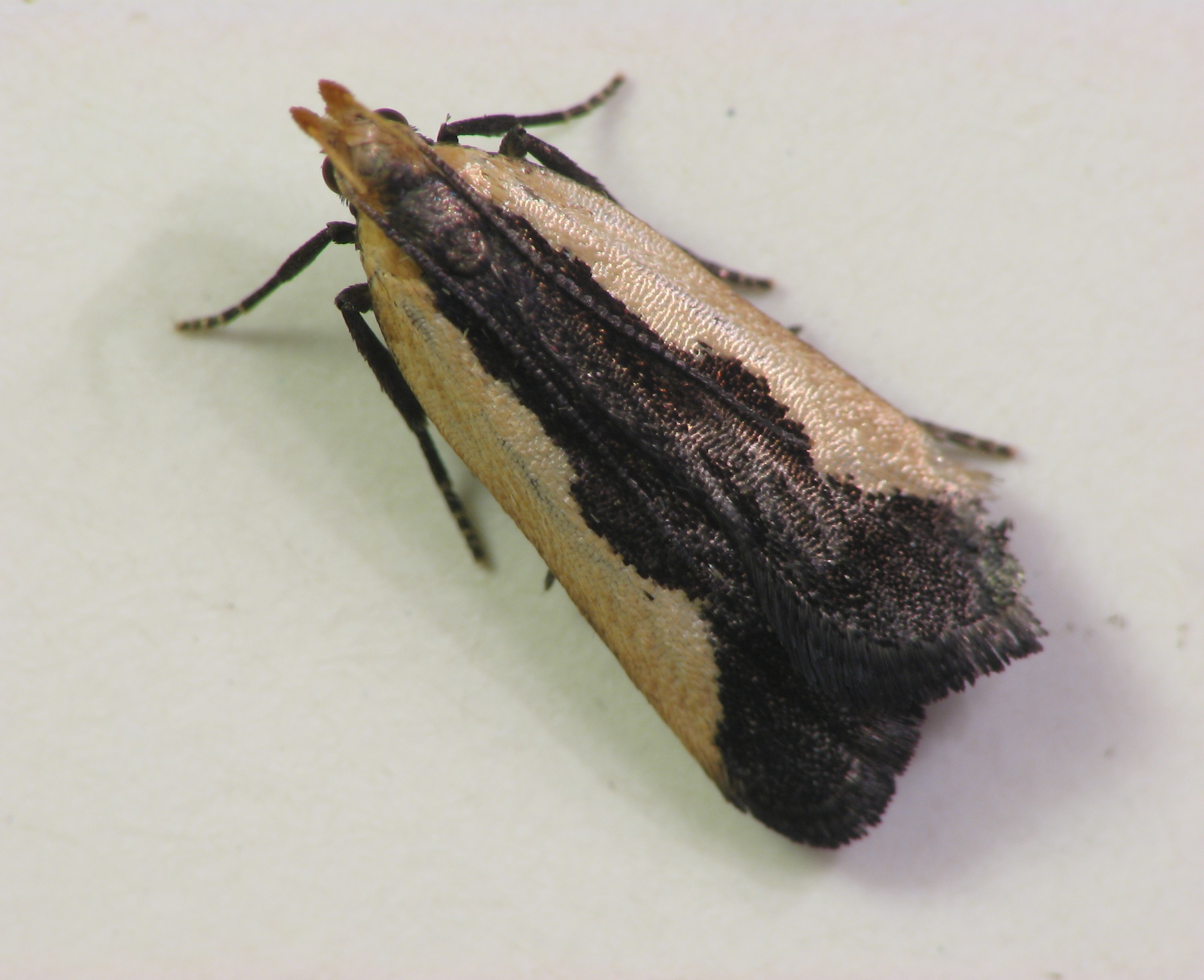

Scientific classification
- Domain: Eukaryota
- Kingdom: Animalia
- Phylum: Arthropoda
- Class: Insecta
- Order: Lepidoptera
- Family: Gelechiidae
- Genus: Dichomeris
- Species: D. inserrata

Binomial name
- Dichomeris inserrata (Walsingham, 1882)

Synonyms
- Gelechia (Trichotaphe?) inserrata Walsingham, 1882

= Dichomeris inserrata =

Indented dichomeris

Species of moth

Dichomeris inserrata, the indented dichomeris, is a moth of the family Gelechiidae. It is found in the United States, including New Jersey, Missouri, Pennsylvania and Florida.

The wingspan is 5.4-8.3 mm.

The larvae feed on goldenrod.

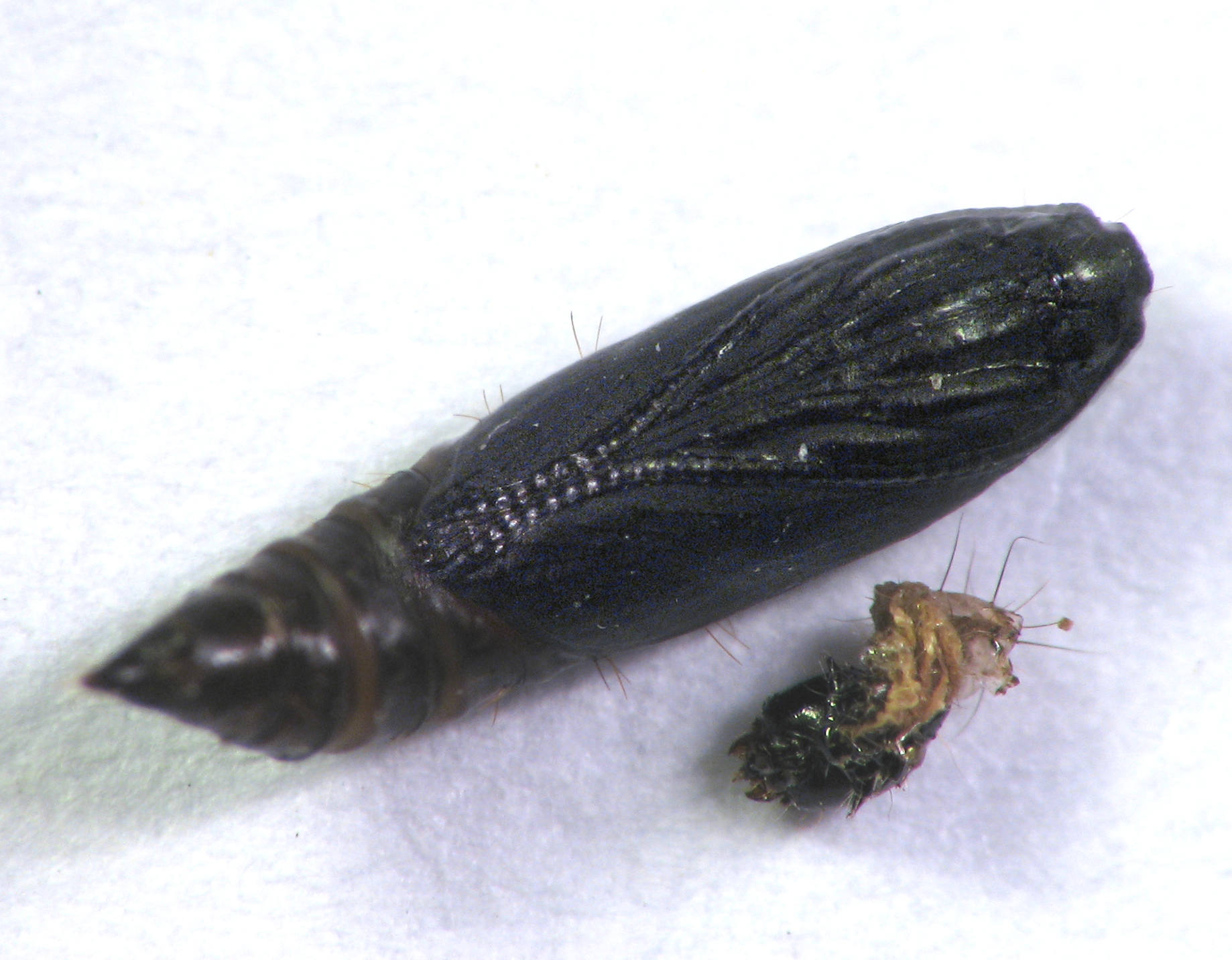
Pupa and head capsule
