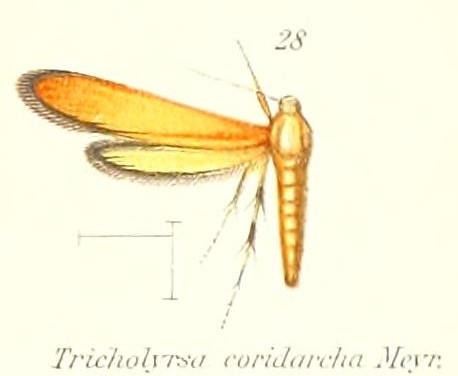
- Trichothyrsa coridarcha

Scientific classification
- Kingdom: Animalia
- Phylum: Arthropoda
- Class: Insecta
- Order: Lepidoptera
- Superfamily: Noctuoidea
- Family: Erebidae
- Subfamily: Boletobiinae
- Genus: Trichothyrsa; Meyrick, 1912

Type species
- Trichothyrsa flammivola Meyrick 1912

= Trichothyrsa =

Genus of moths

Trichothyrsa is a genus of moths of the Heliodinidae family.

== Species ==
- Trichothyrsa bicolorella (Sauber 1902) (from Luzon)
- Trichothyrsa coridarcha Meyrick, 1912 (from India)
- Trichothyrsa flammivola Meyrick 1912 (from India)
- Trichothyrsa grypodes Meyrick, 1912 (from India)
- Trichothyrsa pyrrhocoma Meyrick, 1912 (from Sri Lanka)
- Trichothyrsa taedifera Meyrick, 1912 (from Sri Lanka)
