= Neoheliodines =

Scientific classification
- Kingdom: Animalia
- Phylum: Arthropoda
- Clade: Pancrustacea
- Class: Insecta
- Order: Lepidoptera
- Family: Heliodinidae
- Genus: Neoheliodines; Hsu & Powell, 2005

Species
- N. arizonense; N. cliffordi; N. hodgesi; N. nyctaginella; N. vernius

Genus of moths

Neoheliodines is a genus of moths belonging to the family Heliodinidae. It is endemic to the Americas.

Species:

- Neoheliodines arizonense
- Neoheliodines cliffordi
- Neoheliodines hodgesi
- Neoheliodines nyctaginella
- Neoheliodines vernius
