= Placoptila resoluta =

Scientific classification
- Kingdom: Animalia
- Phylum: Arthropoda
- Class: Insecta
- Order: Lepidoptera
- Family: Cosmopterigidae
- Genus: Placoptila
- Species: P. resoluta

Binomial name
- Placoptila resoluta (Diakonoff, 1948)

Synonyms
- Pyroderces resoluta Diakonoff, 1948

Species of moth

Placoptila resoluta is a moth in the family Cosmopterigidae. It is found on Buru.
