= Placoptila choromima =

Scientific classification
- Kingdom: Animalia
- Phylum: Arthropoda
- Class: Insecta
- Order: Lepidoptera
- Family: Cosmopterigidae
- Genus: Placoptila
- Species: P. choromima

Binomial name
- Placoptila choromima Meyrick, 1931

Species of moth

Placoptila choromima is a moth in the family Cosmopterigidae. It is found on Java.
