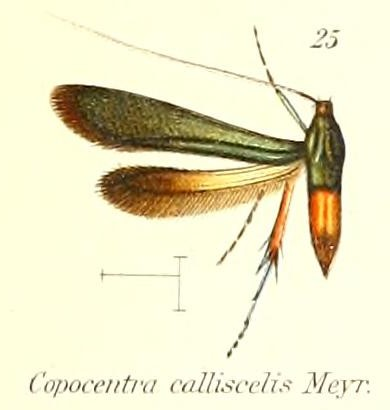
- Copocentra calliscelis

Scientific classification
- Kingdom: Animalia
- Phylum: Arthropoda
- Clade: Pancrustacea
- Class: Insecta
- Order: Lepidoptera
- Family: Heliodinidae
- Genus: Copocentra; Meyrick, 1909

= Copocentra =

Genus of moths

Copocentra is a genus of moths in the family of Heliodinidae.

== Species ==
- Copocentra calliscelis Meyrick, 1909 (from South America)
- Copocentra notopyrsa Meyrick, 1936 (from Peru)
- Copocentra porphyropis
- Copocentra saltatoria
- Copocentra submetallica
