= Gymnogelastis =

Scientific classification
- Kingdom: Animalia
- Phylum: Arthropoda
- Class: Insecta
- Order: Lepidoptera
- Family: Heliodinidae
- Genus: Gymnogelastis; Meyrick, 1930

Type species
- Melodryas miranda Meyrick, 1913

Genus of moths

Gymnogelastis is a genus of moths of the family Heliodinidae.

== Species ==
- Gymnogelastis miranda (Meyrick, 1913) (from New Guinea)
