= Physoptila =

Scientific classification
- Domain: Eukaryota
- Kingdom: Animalia
- Phylum: Arthropoda
- Class: Insecta
- Order: Lepidoptera
- Family: Gelechiidae
- Subfamily: Physoptilinae
- Genus: Physoptila; Meyrick, 1914

Synonyms
- Aenicteria Turner, 1926

Genus of moths

Physoptila is a genus of moth in the family Gelechiidae.

== Species ==
- Physoptila scenica Meyrick, 1914
- Physoptila pinguivora Meyrick, 1934
- Physoptila termiticola (Turner, 1926)
