= Aerotypia =

Scientific classification
- Kingdom: Animalia
- Phylum: Arthropoda
- Clade: Pancrustacea
- Class: Insecta
- Order: Lepidoptera
- Family: Gelechiidae
- Genus: Aerotypia; Walsingham, 1911
- Species: A. pleurotella

Binomial name
- Aerotypia pleurotella Walsingham, 1911

Genus of moths

Aerotypia is a genus of moth in the family Gelechiidae. It contains the species Aerotypia pleurotella, which is found in Morelos, Mexico.

The wingspan is 40–42 mm. The forewings are ochreous, fading to ochreous white from below the middle to the dorsum. From the base below the costa to the apex runs a straight white streak of even width throughout, above it the ochreous ground-colour is tinged with pale olivaceous fuscous to the costa, as also narrowly along its lower margin, making it very clearly defined. The hindwings are pale brownish fuscous, tending to fade to paler from the costa to the dorsum.
