= Placoptila semioceros =

Scientific classification
- Kingdom: Animalia
- Phylum: Arthropoda
- Class: Insecta
- Order: Lepidoptera
- Family: Cosmopterigidae
- Genus: Placoptila
- Species: P. semioceros

Binomial name
- Placoptila semioceros (Meyrick, 1935)

Synonyms
- Stagmatophora semioceros Meyrick, 1935

Species of moth

Placoptila semioceros is a moth in the family Cosmopterigidae. It is found in Taiwan.
