= Syrmadaula =

Scientific classification
- Domain: Eukaryota
- Kingdom: Animalia
- Phylum: Arthropoda
- Class: Insecta
- Order: Lepidoptera
- Family: Gelechiidae
- Genus: Syrmadaula; Meyrick, 1918
- Species: S. automorpha

Binomial name
- Syrmadaula automorpha Meyrick, 1918

Genus of moths

Syrmadaula is a monotypic moth genus in the family Gelechiidae. Its only species, Syrmadaula automorpha, is found in Namibia, South Africa and Zimbabwe. Both the genus and species were first described by Edward Meyrick in 1918.

The wingspan is 13–14 mm. The forewings are light fuscous irrorated (sprinkled) with dark fuscous. The stigmata are moderate, dark fuscous, the plical somewhat obliquely before the first discal. There is a dark fuscous dot near the dorsum at three-fourths and there are three or four cloudy dark fuscous dots on the termen. The hindwings are grey.
