= Aproaerema modicella =

Scientific classification
- Domain: Eukaryota
- Kingdom: Animalia
- Phylum: Arthropoda
- Class: Insecta
- Order: Lepidoptera
- Family: Gelechiidae
- Genus: Aproaerema
- Species: A. modicella

Binomial name
- Aproaerema modicella (Deventer, 1904)

Synonyms
- Xystophora modicella Deventer, 1904

Species of moth

Aproaerema modicella is a moth of the family Gelechiidae. It was described by Deventer in 1904. It is found in Indonesia (Java) and India. It has been an invasive on the African continent since 1998 where it is a pest on groundnut and soybean.

The wingspan is 8–10 mm. The base of the forewings is light brown, darkening towards the center, becoming greyish near the fringe. The markings consist of a small round light brownish spot in the middle of the fold and a larger spot at the margin. There are two small dark spots accompanying the first spot. The hindwings are brownish grey.

The larvae feed on Soya hispida, Arachis hypogaea, Glycine max, Medicago sativa and Cajanus cajan.
