= Xestocasis erymnota =

Scientific classification
- Kingdom: Animalia
- Phylum: Arthropoda
- Class: Insecta
- Order: Lepidoptera
- Family: Oecophoridae
- Genus: Xestocasis
- Species: X. erymnota

Binomial name
- Xestocasis erymnota Meyrick, 1917

Species of moth

Xestocasis erymnota is a moth in the family Oecophoridae. It was described by Edward Meyrick in 1917 and is found in the Philippines.
