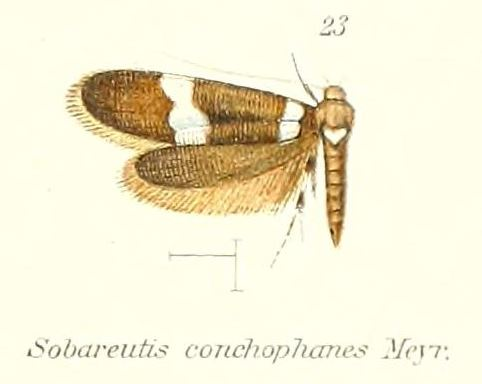

Scientific classification
- Kingdom: Animalia
- Phylum: Arthropoda
- Clade: Pancrustacea
- Class: Insecta
- Order: Lepidoptera
- Family: Heliodinidae
- Genus: Sobareutis; Meyrick, 1910
- Species: S. conchophanes

Binomial name
- Sobareutis conchophanes Meyrick, 1910

= Sobareutis =

Genus of moths

Sobareutis conchophanes is a species of moth of the family Heliodinidae. It is the only species in the genus Sobareutis. It is found in Borneo.

The male of this species has a wingspan of 12 mm. The hindwings are fuscous.
