= Placoptila lucicincta =

Scientific classification
- Kingdom: Animalia
- Phylum: Arthropoda
- Class: Insecta
- Order: Lepidoptera
- Family: Cosmopterigidae
- Genus: Placoptila
- Species: P. lucicincta

Binomial name
- Placoptila lucicincta Meyrick, 1920

Species of moth

Placoptila lucicincta is a moth in the family Cosmopterigidae. It is found on Java.
