= Placoptila =

Scientific classification
- Kingdom: Animalia
- Phylum: Arthropoda
- Class: Insecta
- Order: Lepidoptera
- Family: Cosmopterigidae
- Subfamily: Cosmopteriginae
- Genus: Placoptila; Meyrick, 1894

Genus of moths

Placoptila is a genus of moths in the family Cosmopterigidae.

== Species ==
- Placoptila artionoma Meyrick, 1919
- Placoptila choromima Meyrick, 1931
- Placoptila cyanolychna Meyrick, 1911
- Placoptila cyclas Meyrick, 1937
- Placoptila electrica Meyrick, 1894
- Placoptila lucicincta Meyrick, 1920
- Placoptila resoluta (Diakonoff, 1948)
- Placoptila semioceros (Meyrick, 1935)
