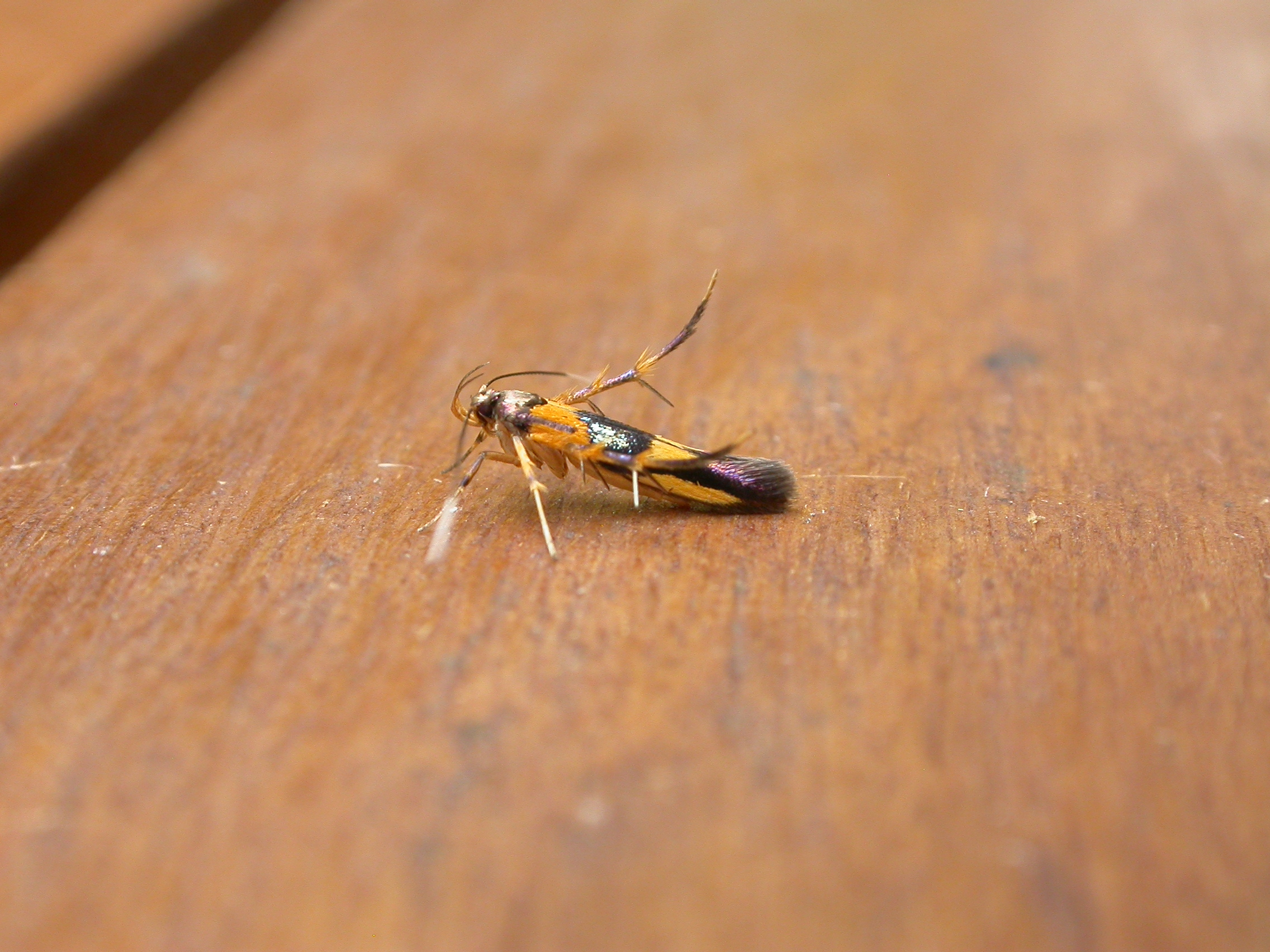

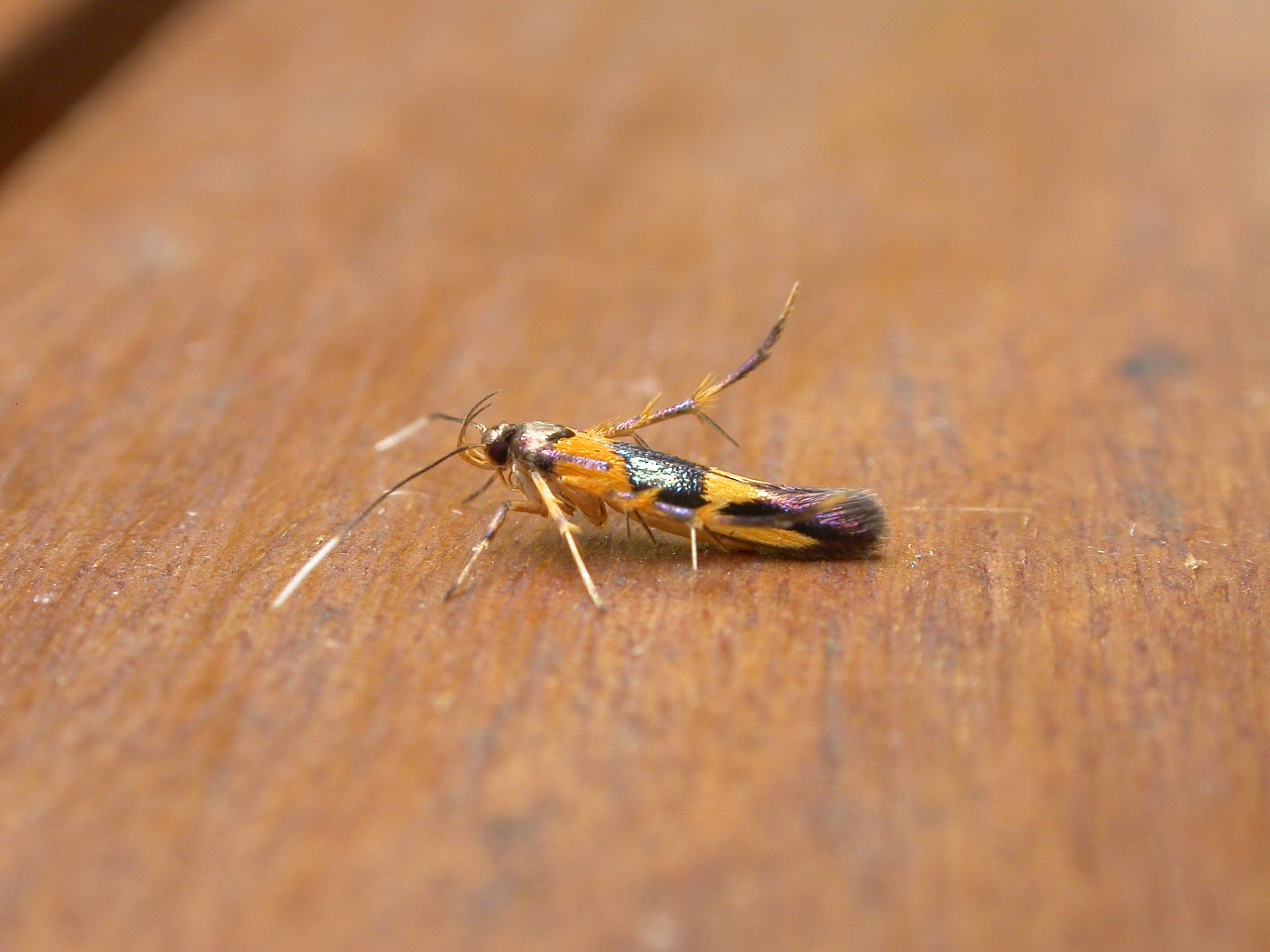

Scientific classification
- Kingdom: Animalia
- Phylum: Arthropoda
- Class: Insecta
- Order: Lepidoptera
- Family: Oecophoridae
- Genus: Xestocasis
- Species: X. balanochrysa

Binomial name
- Xestocasis balanochrysa Meyrick, 1915

Synonyms
- Limnaecia balanochrysa

= Xestocasis balanochrysa =

Species of moth

Xestocasis balanochrysa is a species of moth of the family Oecophoridae. It is found in Australia.
