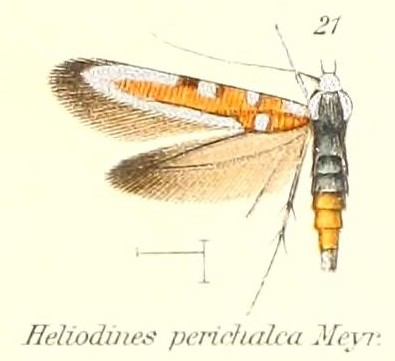

Scientific classification
- Kingdom: Animalia
- Phylum: Arthropoda
- Clade: Pancrustacea
- Class: Insecta
- Order: Lepidoptera
- Family: Heliodinidae
- Genus: Heliodines; Stainton, 1854

= Heliodines =

Genus of moth

Heliodines is a genus of moths belonging to the family Heliodinidae.

The species of this genus are found in Europe and Northern America.

Species:

- Heliodines albiciliella Busck, 1909
- Heliodines aureoflamma Walsingham, 1897
