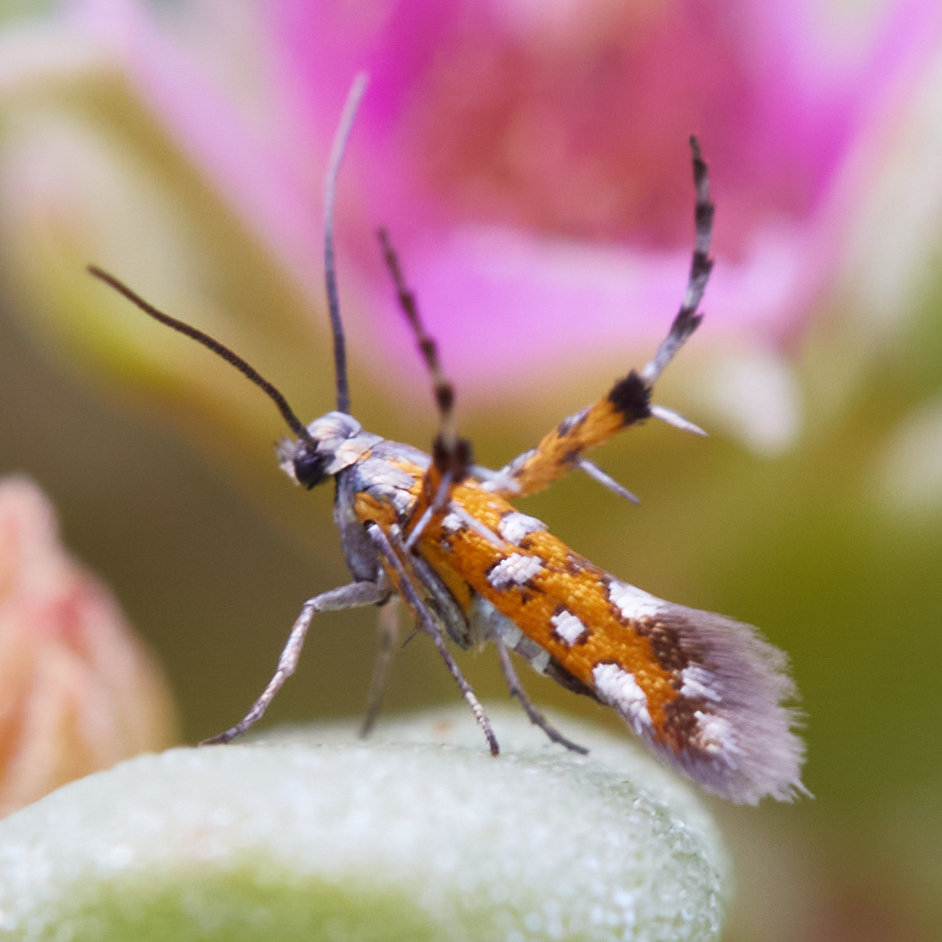
- Aetole prenticei

Scientific classification
- Kingdom: Animalia
- Phylum: Arthropoda
- Clade: Pancrustacea
- Class: Insecta
- Order: Lepidoptera
- Family: Heliodinidae
- Genus: Aetole; Chambers, 1875

= Aetole (moth) =

Genus of moth

Aetole is a genus of moths belonging to the family Heliodinidae, the sun moths. All known species of this genus, like many other sun moths, perch with their hind legs raised.

== Species ==
Aetole contains the following species:

- Aetole aprica
- Aetole bella
- Aetole calcifer
- Aetole calciferoides
- Aetole cera
- Aetole eximia
- Aetole extraneella
- Aetole favonia
- Aetole fulgida
- Aetole galapagoensis
- Aetole insolita
- Aetole inusitata
- Aetole prenticei
- Aetole schulzella
- Aetole tripunctella
- Aetole unipunctella
