= Tecia solanivora =

Scientific classification
- Kingdom: Animalia
- Phylum: Arthropoda
- Clade: Pancrustacea
- Class: Insecta
- Order: Lepidoptera
- Family: Gelechiidae
- Genus: Tecia
- Species: T. solanivora

Binomial name
- Tecia solanivora (Povolný, 1973)

Synonyms
- Scrobipalpopsis solanivora Povolný, 1973

Species of moth

Tecia solanivora, the Central American potato tuberworm, Guatemalan tuber moth, or Guatemalan potato moth, is a moth in the family Gelechiidae. It was described by Povolný in 1973. It is found from Guatemala, through Central America (Costa Rica, El Salvador, Honduras, Nicaragua, Panama) to South America, where it has been recorded from Colombia, Ecuador, Venezuela and Peru. It has also been introduced on the Canary Islands and mainland Spain.

The Guatemalan tuber moth, in sufficiently large infestations, can lead to a complete yield loss. Although there is natural variation in the tolerance of potato varieties to feeding by Guatemalan tuber moths, higher tolerance is associated with decreased yield in the absence of infestation. In some potato varieties, notably Pastusa Suprema, infestation of a small number of tubers on each plant can cause uninfested tubers on the infested plants to become larger, leading to increased yield (up to around 20%). Changes in photosynthesis and increased starch accumulation in uninfested tubers begin within days of Guatemalan tuber moth infestation. Tuber infestation by Guatemalan tuber moths also increases above-ground potato resistance to feeding by two other lepidopteran pests, beet armyworms (Spodoptera exigua) and fall armyworms (Spodoptera frugiperda).

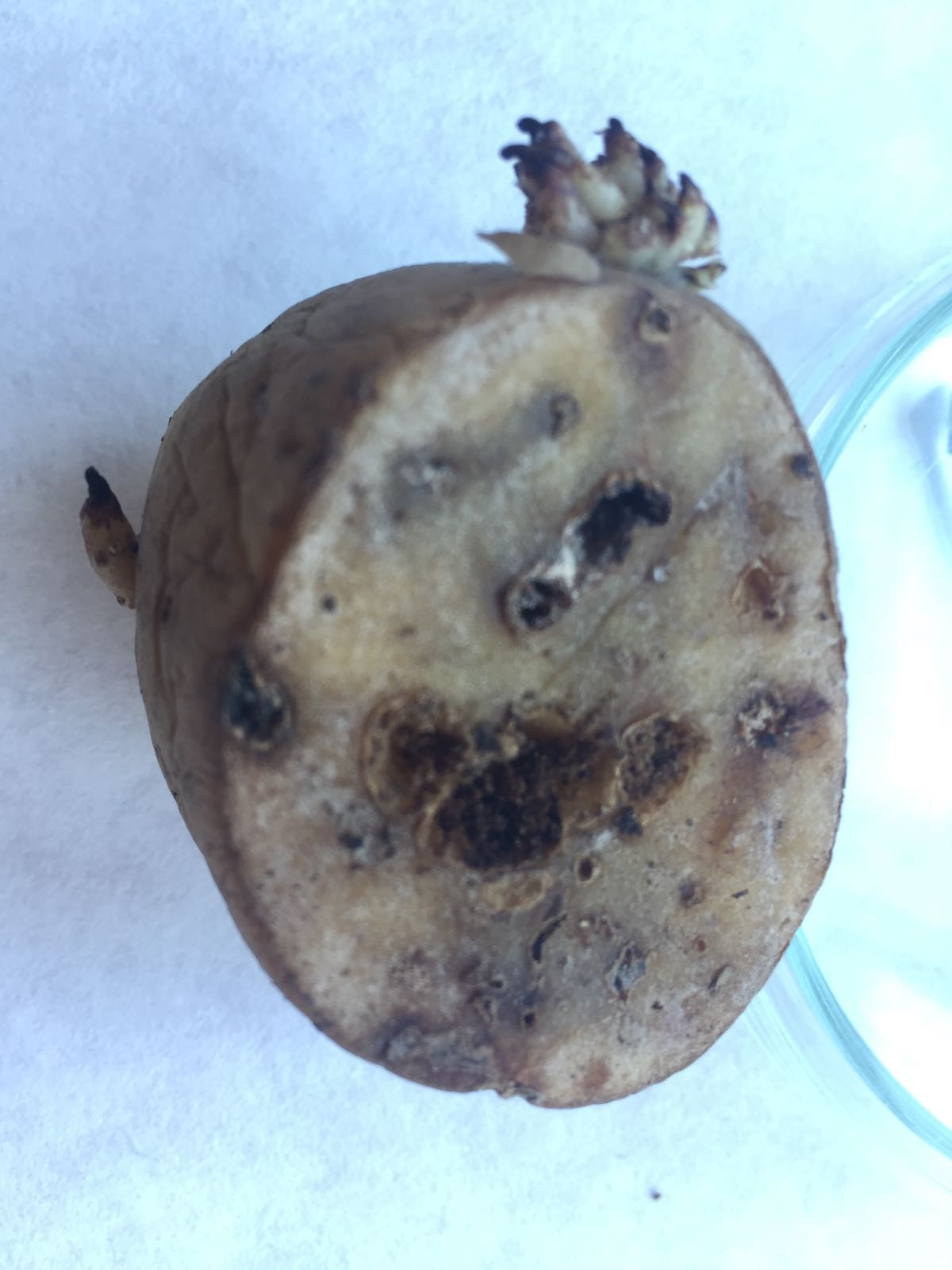
A potato damaged by infestation of the Guatemalan potato moth
