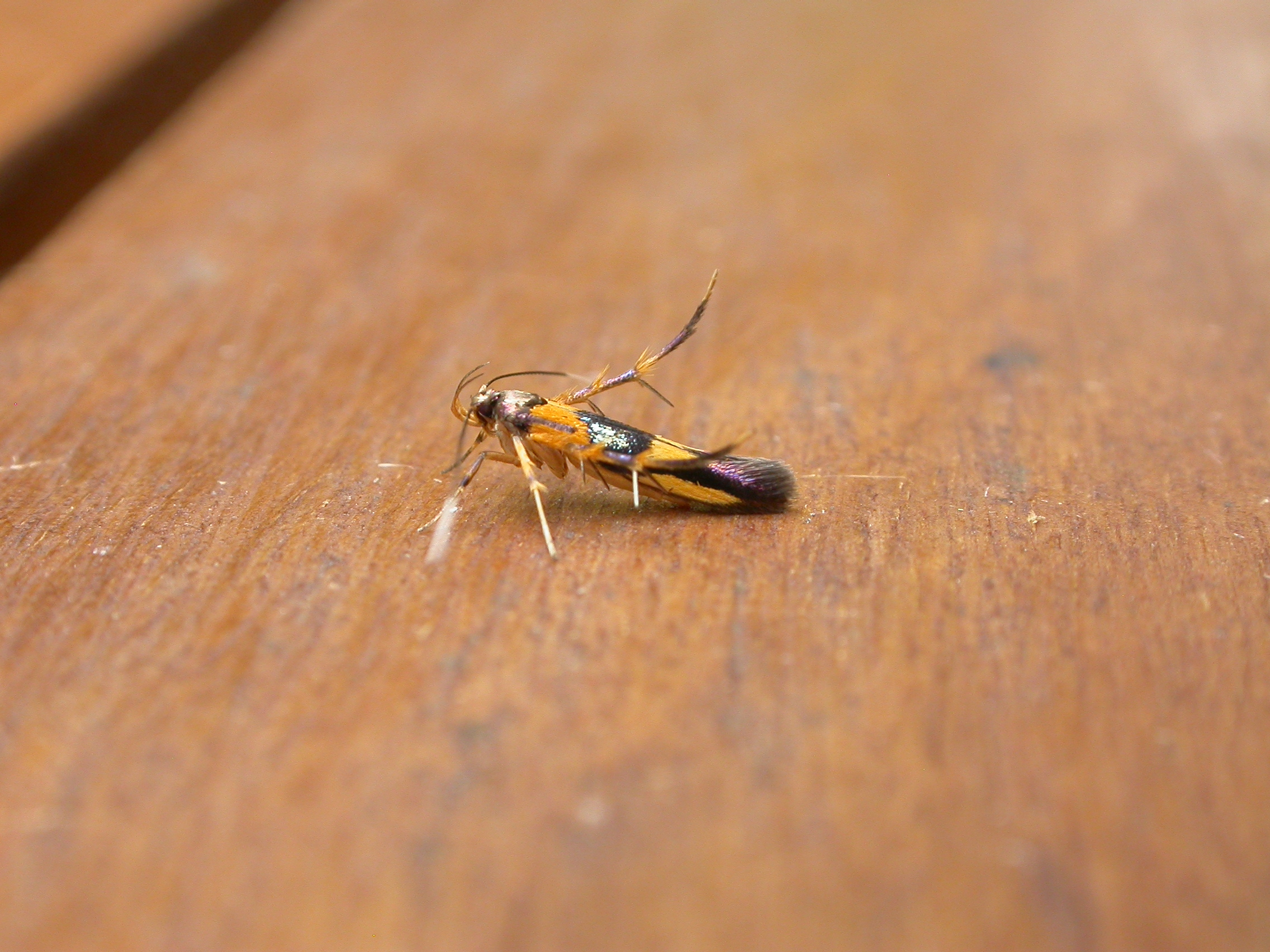
- Xestocasis balanochrysa

Scientific classification
- Kingdom: Animalia
- Phylum: Arthropoda
- Clade: Pancrustacea
- Class: Insecta
- Order: Lepidoptera
- Superfamily: Yponomeutoidea
- Family: Heliodinidae; Heinemann, 1877

Type genus
- Heliodines Stainton, 1854

Diversity
- About 400 species in 64 genera

= Heliodinidae =

Family of moths

Heliodinidae, commonly known as sun moths, is a family of small moths with slender bodies and narrow wings. Members of this family are found in most parts of the world. Heliodinid moths are brightly coloured day-flying moths. The base of the haustellum is bare. The scales on the head are compact and appear like a shield. Many Heliodinidae raise their hindlegs when resting but this is not a taxonomic feature and several genera like Epicroesa and Lamprolophus do not show this posture. Many Heliodinidae have the inner and outer spurs of the metatibia subequal. The larval host plants of the majority of species are in the Aizoaceae, Chenopodiaceae, Phytolaccaceae, Portulacaceae and Nyctaginaceae, all in the Order Caryophyllales. A few feed on Onagraceae, Araliaceae and Piperaceae. The larvae's feeding strategies include skeletonizing leaves (consumption of most of the leaf while leaving behind the stems), boring into leaf stems, leaf mining, and opportunistically invading cecidomyiid galls. The pupae have long stiff hairs on their back sides.

== Genera ==
The family includes the following genera:

- Acanthocasis
- Actinoscelis
- Adamantoscelis
- Aetole
- Agalmoscelis
- Amphiclada
- Anypoptus
- Athlostola
- Atrijuglans
- Beijinga
- Bonia
- Camineutis
- Capanica
- Chrysoxestis
- Coleopholas
- Copocentra
- Craterobathra
- Crembalastis
- Cyanarmostis
- Cycloplasis
- Diascepsis
- Echinophrictis
- Ecrectica
- Embola
- Encratora
- Epicroesa
- Ethirastis
- Gnamptonoma
- Gymnogelastis
- Gymnomacha
- Haemangela
- Heliodines
- Heliogemma
- Hemicalyptris
- Hethmoscelis
- Hierophanes
- Lamprolophus
- Lamproteucha
- Leuroscelis
- Lissocnemitis
- Lithariapteryx
- Lithotactis
- Machaerocrates
- Magorrhabda
- Molybdurga
- Neoheliodines
- Philocoristis
- Protanystis
- Pseudastasia
- Pteropygme
- Scelorthus
- Sisyrotarsa
- Sobareutis
- Thrasydoxa
- Thriambeutis
- Trichothyrsa
- Trychnopepla
- Wygodzinskyiana
- Xestocasis

== Former genera ==
- Aenicteria
- Coracistis
- Lamachaera
- Percnarcha
- Placoptila
- Zapyrastra has been listed in the Heliodinidae but is now part of Momphidae.
