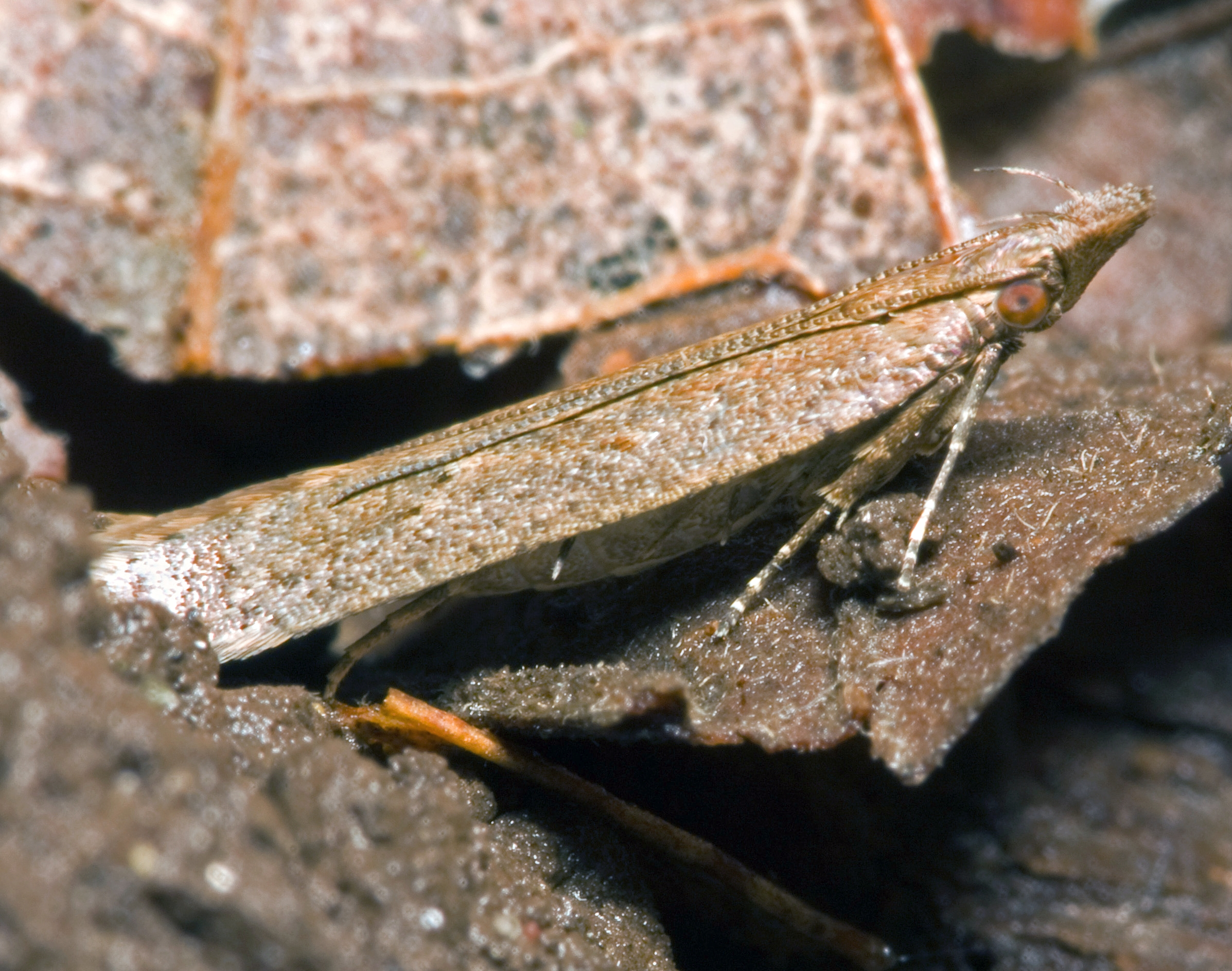
- Dichomeris ligulella

Scientific classification
- Kingdom: Animalia
- Phylum: Arthropoda
- Clade: Pancrustacea
- Class: Insecta
- Order: Lepidoptera
- Superfamily: Gelechioidea
- Family: Gelechiidae; Stainton, 1854

Subfamilies
- See text

Synonyms
- Brachmiinae; Deoclonidae; Gelechiadae (lapsus); Physoptilinae (but see text)

= Gelechiidae =

Family of moths

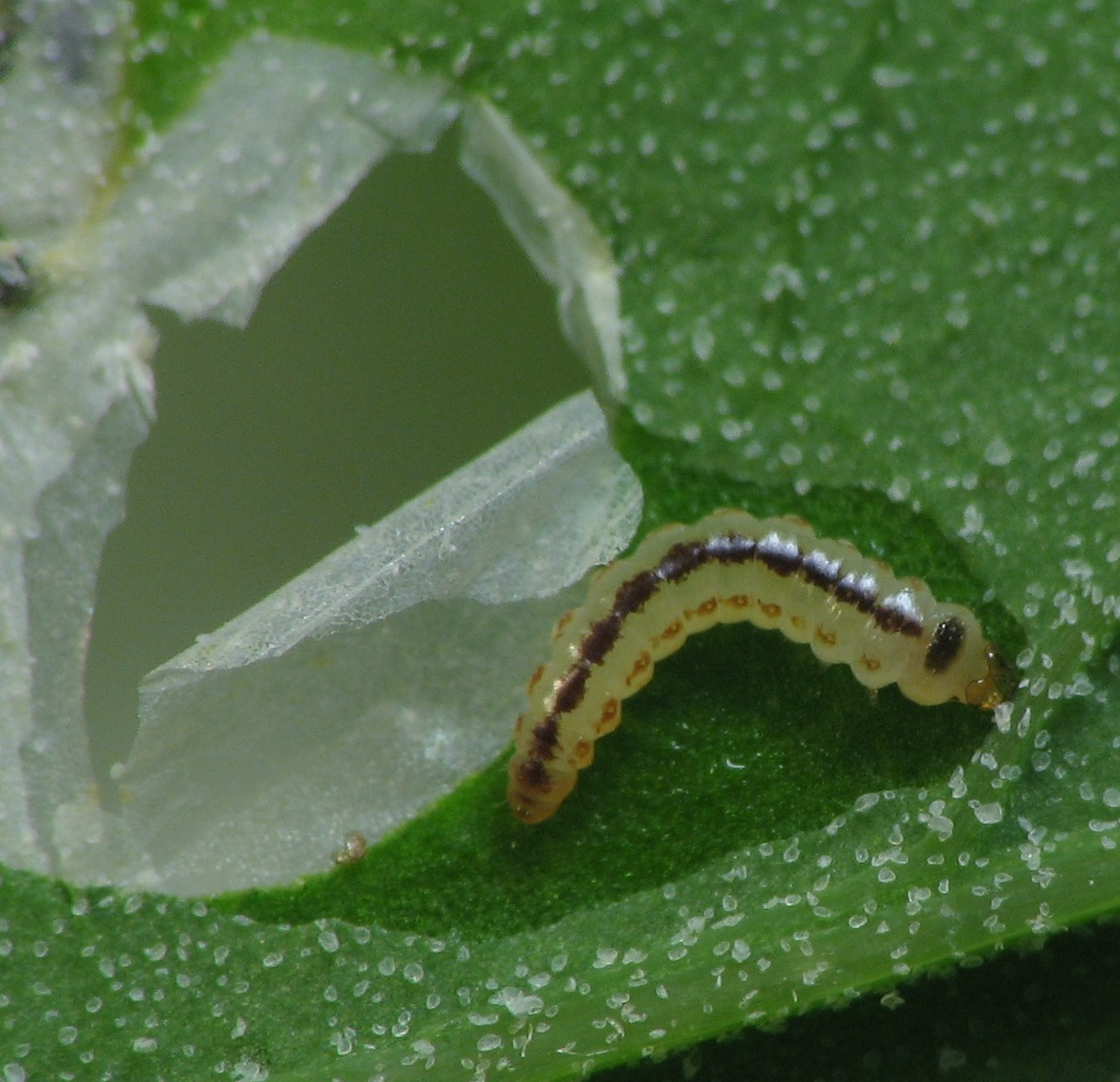
Larva of Chrysoesthia sexguttella in a mine in Chenopodium album

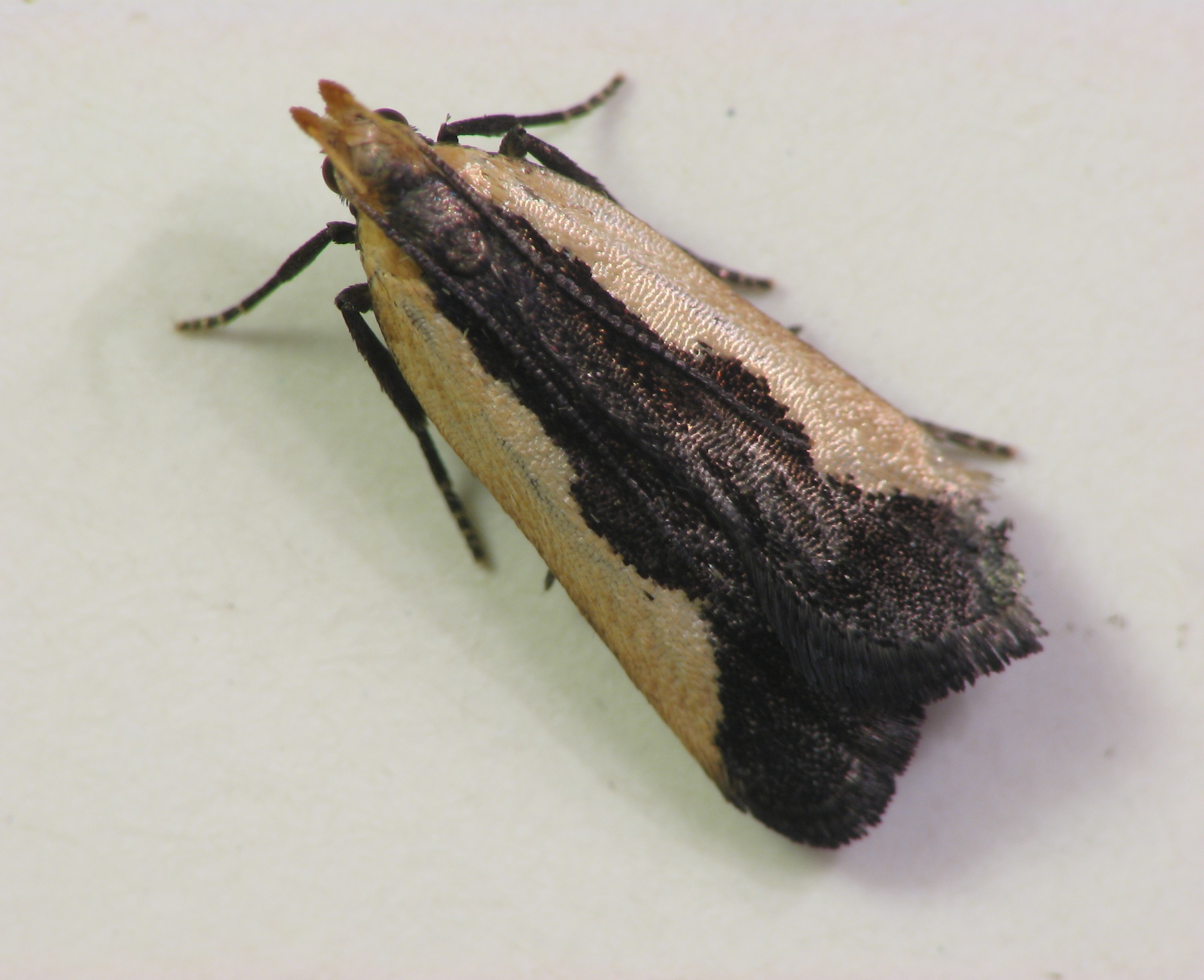
Dichomeris inserrata

The Gelechiidae are a family of moths commonly referred to as twirler moths or gelechiid moths. They are the namesake family of the huge and little-studied superfamily Gelechioidea, and the family's taxonomy has been subject to considerable dispute. These are generally very small moths with narrow, fringed wings. The larvae of most species feed internally on various parts of their host plants, sometimes causing galls. Douglas-fir (Pseudotsuga) is a host plant common to many species of the family, particularly of the genus Chionodes, which as a result is more diverse in North America than usual for Gelechioidea.

By the late 20th century, over 900 genera with altogether more than 4,500 species were placed here, with about 650 genera known from North America alone. While these figures are certainly outdated, due to the many revisions to superfamily Gelechioidea and new descriptions of twirler moths, they still serve to show the enormous biodiversity contained in this important family.

Being abundant, fecund plant-eaters, many species are agricultural pests, including:

- Anarsia lineatella – peach twig borer
- Aproaerema modicella – groundnut leafminer
- Keiferia lycopersicella – tomato pinworm
- Pectinophora gossypiella – pink bollworm
- Phthorimaea operculella – potato tuber moth, tobacco splitworm
- Sitotroga cerealella – angoumois grain moth
- Tecia solanivora (Povolny, 1973) – Guatemalan potato moth, Central American potato tuber moth
- Tuta absoluta – tomato leafminer, South American tomato moth

The voracious habits of their larvae make twirler moths suitable for biological control of invasive plants. The spotted knapweed seedhead moth (Metzneria paucipunctella), for example, is used to control spotted knapweed (Centaurea maculosa) in North America.

== Taxonomy and systematics ==
Compared to the other massively diverse Gelechioidea families – Coleophoridae (case-bearers) and Oecophoridae (concealer moths) – the systematics of the Gelechiidae are far less contentious. The "Deoclonidae", sometimes treated as a full gelechioid family, seem to be nothing other than a specialized offshoot from within the Gelechiidae, and are here included in the present family; some authors differ, however, and ally at least some of these genera with the Autostichinae and/or Symmocidae. On the other hand, the Schistonoeidae (scavenger moths) are preliminarily considered a distinct family here.

Of the subfamilies traditionally accepted for the Gelechiidae, only three were maintained for some time pending further information; at least one other, the Physoptilinae, were suggested to also be valid. But numerous genera of twirler moths – including most of the former "Deoclonidae" and also the proposed Physoptilinae – were of undetermined affiliation at that moment. Later studies, including a 2013 molecular analysis of the Gelechiidae, list the following subfamilies:

Subfamily Anacampsinae Bruand, 1850
Subfamily Anomologinae Meyrick, 1926
Subfamily Apatetrinae Meyrick, 1947
Subfamily Dichomeridinae Hampson, 1918 (formerly including Chelariinae, which is now placed in Anacampsinae)
Subfamily Gelechiinae Stainton, 1854
Subfamily Physoptilinae Meyrick, 1914
Subfamily Thiotrichinae Karsholt, Mutanen, Lee & Kaila, 2013

Genera incertae sedis

- Aerotypia Walsingham, 1911.
- Antithyra Meyrick, 1906.
- Coniogyra Meyrick, 1921.
- Dicranucha Janse, 1954
- Metopios Lucas, 1945
- Paraschema Povolný, 1990
- Pseudosymmoca Rebel, 1903
- Sphagiocrates Meyrick, 1925
- Stenoalata Omelko in Omelko & Omelko, 1998
- Syrmadaula Meyrick, 1918
