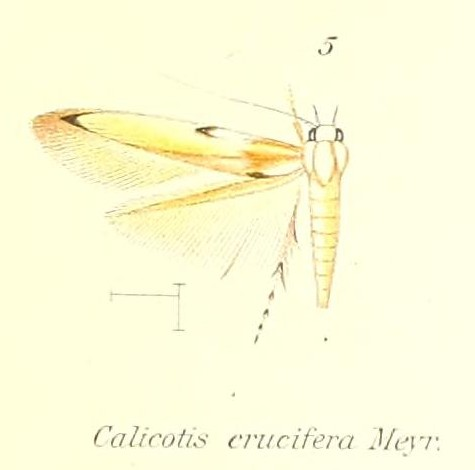
- Calicotis crucifera

Scientific classification
- Kingdom: Animalia
- Phylum: Arthropoda
- Clade: Pancrustacea
- Class: Insecta
- Order: Lepidoptera
- Family: Stathmopodidae
- Genus: Calicotis; Meyrick, 1889

Synonyms
- Pachyrhabda Meyrick, 1889

= Calicotis =

Genus of moths

Calicotis is a genus of moths in the family Stathmopodidae, although it is sometimes included in the family Oecophoridae. This genus was first described by Edward Meyrick in 1889. The type species of this genus is Calicotis crucifera. In 2024, the genus Pachyrhabda was synonymised with Calicotis.

== Species ==
- Calicotis acroscia Turner, 1941 (from Australia)
- Calicotis adela Turner, 1923 (from Australia)
- Calicotis amianta Meyrick, 1927 (from Samoa)
- Calicotis animula Meyrick, 1911 (from the Seychelles)
- Calicotis antinoma Meyrick, 1910 (from Australia & New Zealand)
- Calicotis argyritis Turner, 1941 (from Australia)
- Calicotis attiei (Guillermet, 2011) (from China, Japan, Réunion, Taiwan)
- Calicotis bacterias Meyrick, 1913 (from Australia & Sri Lanka)
- Calicotis campylosticha Turner, 1941 (from Australia)
- Calicotis capnoscia Turner, 1923 (from Australia)
- Calicotis citrinacma Meyrick, 1936 (from Taiwan)
- Calicotis crucifera Meyrick, 1889 (from New Zealand/Australia)
- Calicotis dicastis (Meyrick, 1905) (from India & Sri Lanka)
- Calicotis euphanopis Meyrick, 1927 (from New Hebrides)
- Calicotis exclamationis Terada, 2016 (from Japan, Taiwan)
- Calicotis fissa Meyrick, 1921 (from Java)
- Calicotis griseella Sinev, 1988 (from Russia)
- Calicotis hygrophaes Turner, 1923 (from Australia)
- Calicotis inanis Meyrick, 1936 (from Java)
- Calicotis liriopis Turner, 1941 (from Australia)
- Calicotis luteella Sinev, 1988 (from Russia)
- Calicotis microgalopsis Lower, 1904 (from Australia)
- Calicotis phanta Bradley, 1957 (from Rennel island)
- Calicotis praeusta Meyrick, 1922 (from Fiji)
- Calicotis punctifera Turner, 1941 (from Australia)
- Calicotis rhizomorpha Meyrick, 1927 (from Samoa)
- Calicotis rotundinidus Terada, 2016 (from Japan, Taiwan)
- Calicotis sialota Turner, 1917 (from Australia)
- Calicotis steropodes Meyrick, 1897 (from Australia)
- Calicotis suspecta Meyrick, 1921 (from Java)
- Calicotis tridora Meyrick, 1911 (from the Seychelles)
- Calicotis triplecta Meyrick, 1913 (from South Africa)
- Calicotis triploesta Turner, 1923 (from Australia)
- Calicotis tumida Meyrick, 1913 (from Sri Lanka)
- Calicotis unctoria Meyrick, 1911 (from South Africa)
- Calicotis viscosa Meyrick, 1913 (from India)
- Calicotis xanthoscia Turner, 1923 (from Australia)
