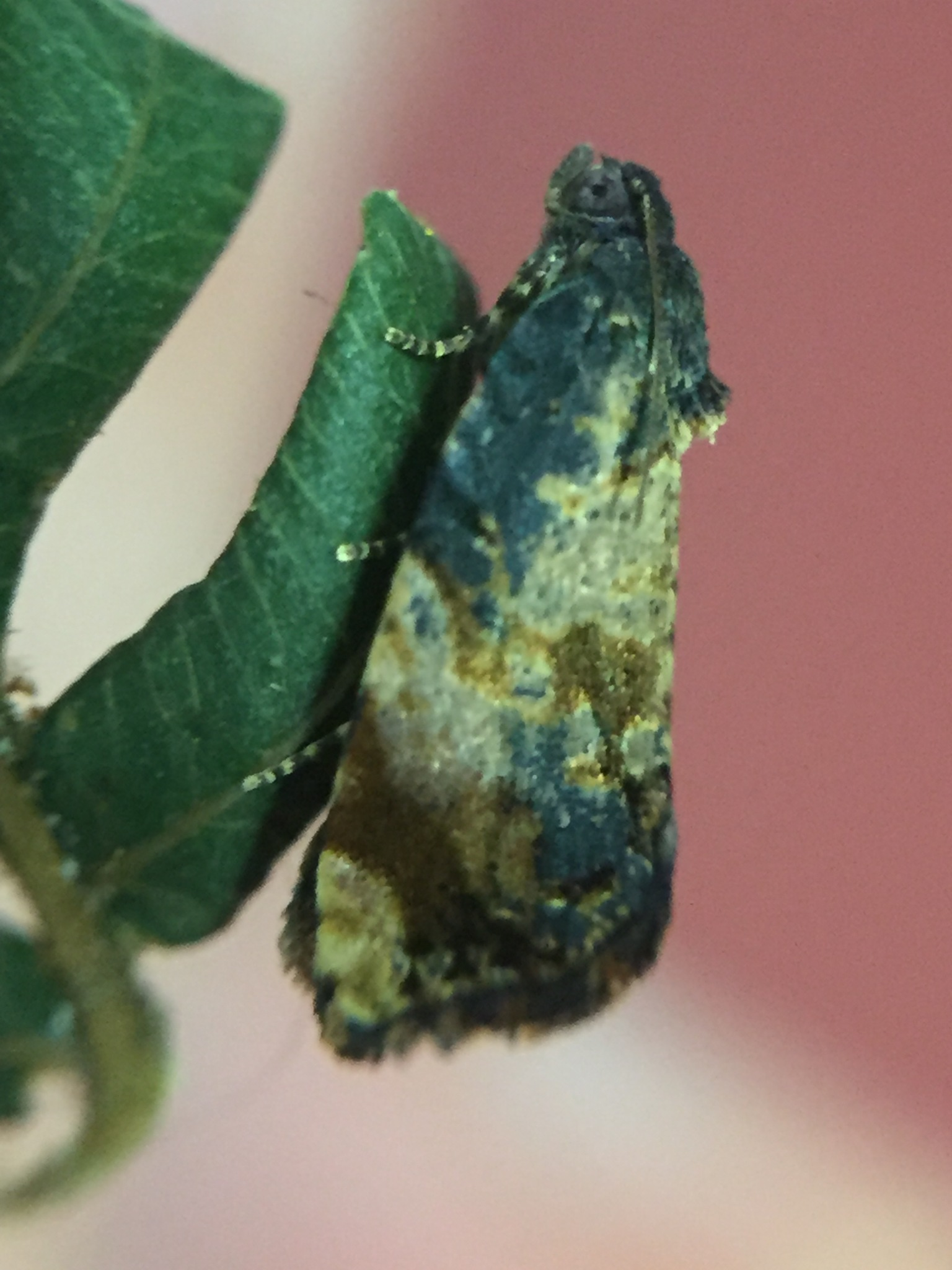

Scientific classification
- Kingdom: Animalia
- Phylum: Arthropoda
- Clade: Pancrustacea
- Class: Insecta
- Order: Lepidoptera
- Family: Tortricidae
- Tribe: Archipini
- Genus: Philocryptica; Meyrick, 1923
- Species: P. polypodii

Binomial name
- Philocryptica polypodii (Watt, 1921)

Synonyms
- Harmologa polypodii Watt, 1921

= Philocryptica =

Monotypic genus of tortrix moths

Philocryptica is a monotypic genus of moths belonging to the subfamily Tortricinae of the family Tortricidae. It contains only one species, Philocryptica polypodii, the leather-leaf star-miner, which is endemic to New Zealand. This species has been recorded in both the North Island and the South Island, as far south as Banks Peninsula. The preferred habitat of this species is native forest where its larval host plant is present. The larvae feed on Pyrrosia eleagnifolia, mining the leaves. P. polypodii pupates within the final blotch-mine. Adults are on the wing in November and December and are attracted to light.

== Taxonomy ==
The genus Philocryptica was first described by Edward Meyrick in 1923. The species was first described by Morris Watt in 1921 using a darkly marked species in the Wellington Botanic Gardens and originally named Harmologa polypodii. In 1923 Meyrick placed this species in the newly described genus Philocryptica. In 1924 Watt described the life history of this species in detail. George Hudson discussed and illustrated this species in his 1928 book The butterflies and moths of New Zealand. The male lectotype collected in Wellington is held at the Te Papa.

== Description ==
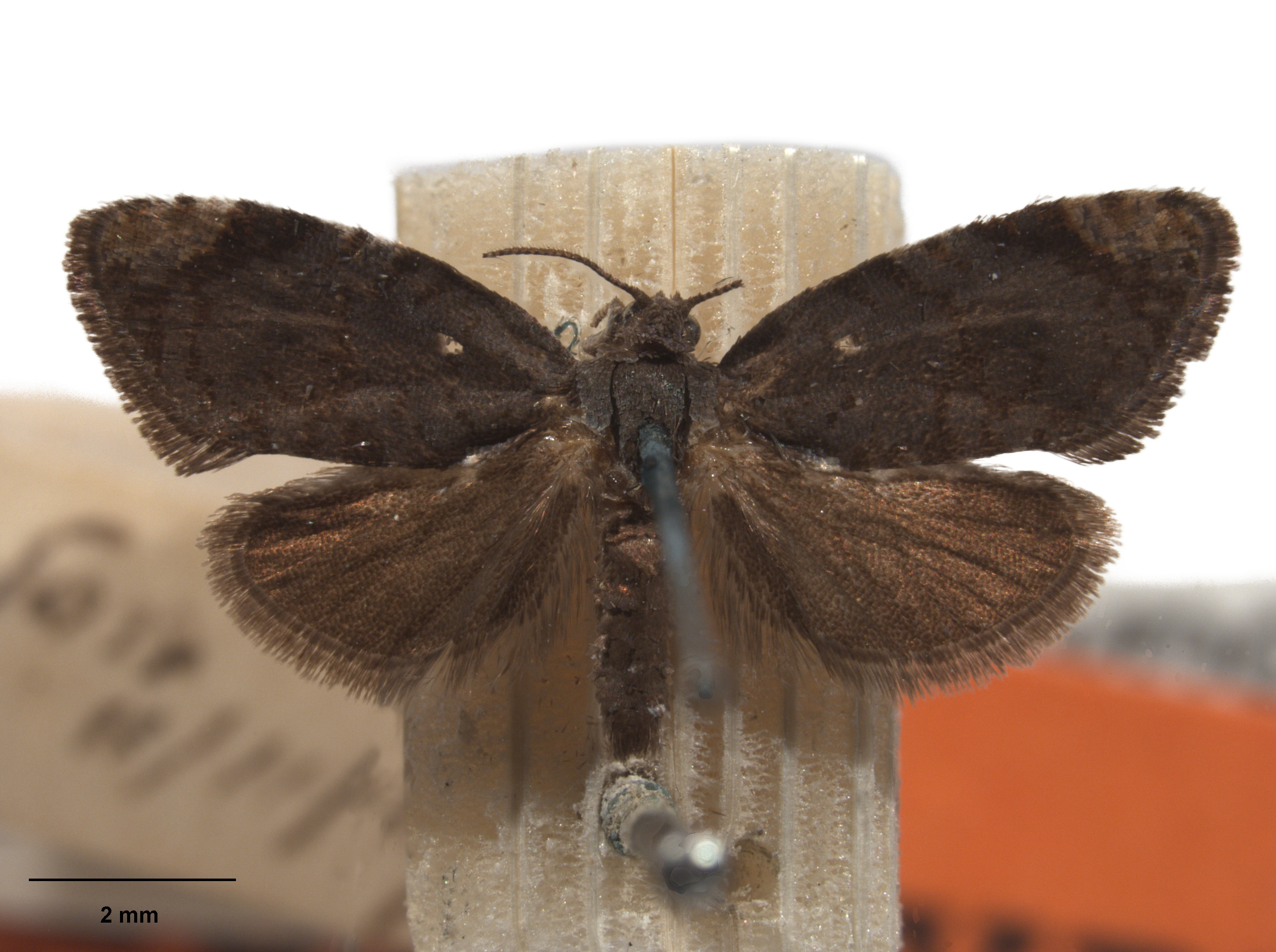
Lectotype specimen.

The genus was described by Edward Meyrick as follows:

Antennae in ♂ rather strongly ciliated. Palpi rather short, obliquely ascending, second joint with tolerably appressed scales. Thorax with strong double posterior crest. Forewings 7 and 8 separate, 7 to termen. Hindwings without cubital pecten, 3 approximated at base to 4, 4 and 5 short-stalked, 6 and 7 stalked.

The larvae of P. polypodii were described by Watts as follows:

Length when full-grown about 12-14 mm. Cylindrical; ground-colour bright green, head and prothoracic shield dark grey-brown; skin transparent, disclosing a bright -green alimentary canal and dorsal vessel. Tubercles small, green; setae light grey. Skin covered with minute pile except in vicinity of tubercles. Thoracic legs normally developed; prolegs on segments 3-6 inclusive and 10; ventral prolegs possess complete circles of 16-18 crochets each, the anal prolegs possess only a semicircle of 10-12 crochets each. Spiracles small, circular.

Hudson described the pupa of the species as follows:

The pupa is enclosed in a cylindrical cocoon of thin white silk, constructed within the final blotch-mine, the larva having prepared an exit through which the pupa protrudes its anterior portions prior to emergence.

Hudson described the adults of the species as follows:

The expansion of the wings is about 1/2 inch. The fore-wings are broad with the costa very strongly and evenly arched and the termen rounded; in female brownish-ochreous with dull blue, deep red, and yellow-brown markings; there is a broad horizontal dull blue band along the costa from the base to nearly 1/2 and a very large tornal blotch extending along the termen almost as far as the apex; a broad, very oblique deep red bar extends from the costa at about 3 to the termen below the apex where it joins the tornal blotch; there are several small yellow-brown marks on the dorsum, on the discal edges of the costal band and tornal blotch, and on the pale apical patch; the cilia are blackish. The hind-wings, which have the apex rounded, are deep brown. In the male the fore-wings are almost entirely overspread with dull bluish-black; the red costal bar is very much reduced and margined with black, there are several other indistinct black markings on the costa and in the dise, and a distinct pinkish-ochreous apical patch.

P. polypodii is the only species that creates the star-like pattern on the leaves of its host. This adults of this species is similar in appearance to Tortrix fervida and Tortrix sphenias. However P. polypodii can be distinguished as it has a reddish coloured thorax and leaden coloured forewing scales. The colouration of adult moths ensure the species is well camouflaged when resting against the dead or dying leaves of its host plant.

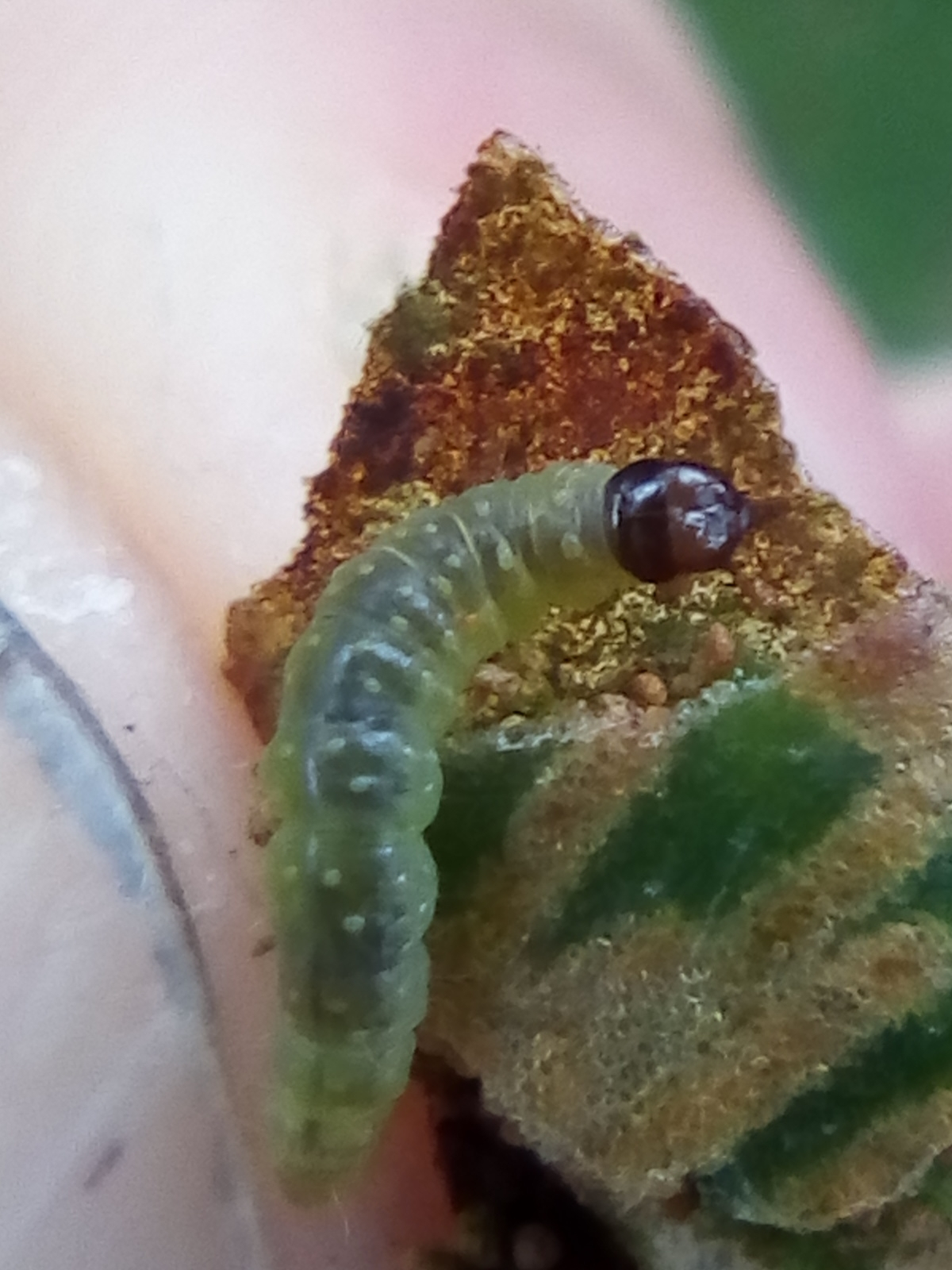
Larva of P. polypodii.

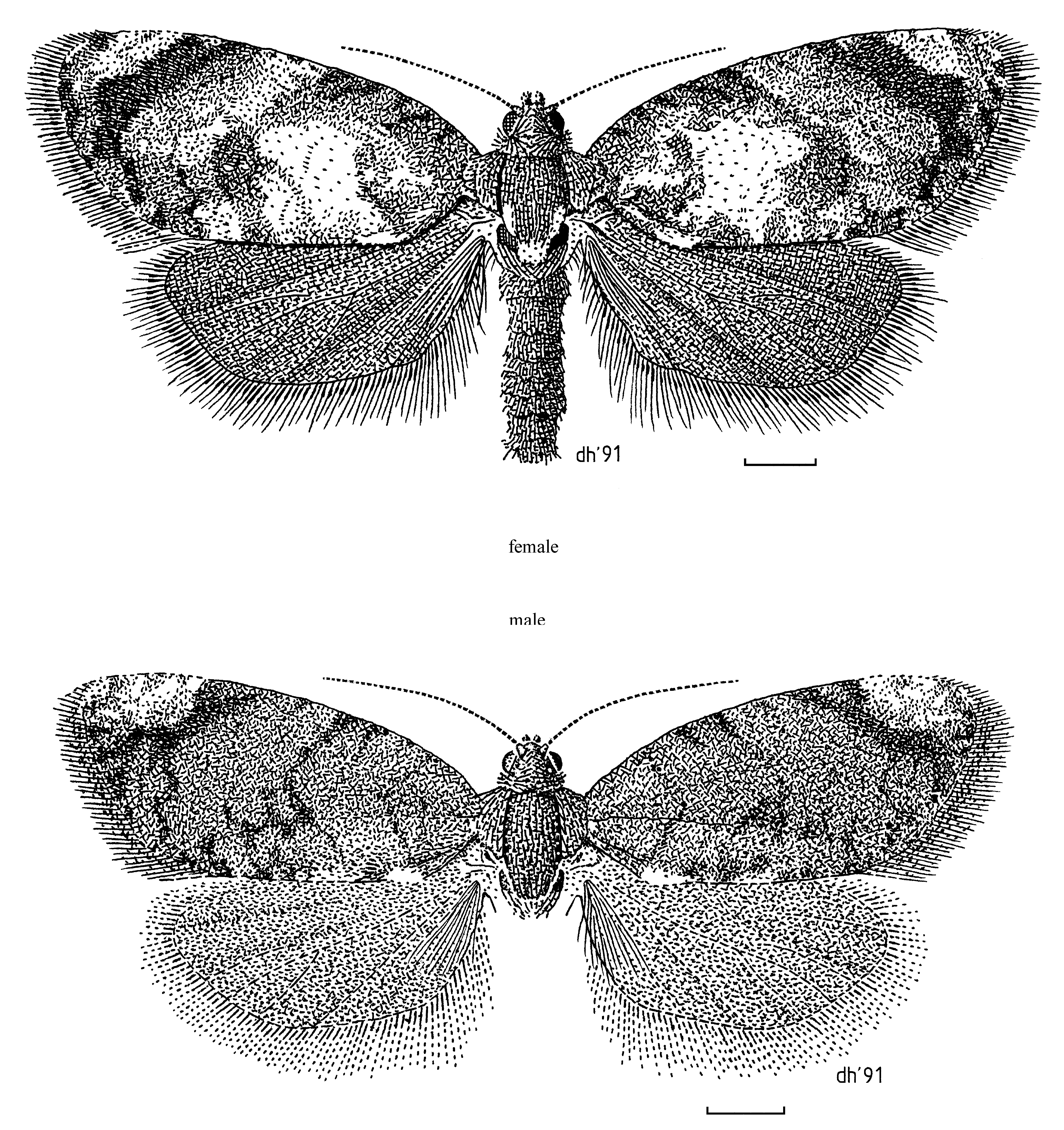
Illustration of male and female specimens of P. polypodii.

== Distribution ==
This species is endemic to New Zealand. It has been recorded in both the North Island and the South Island, as far south as Banks Peninsula.

== Habitat ==
P. polypodii inhabits native forest where the larval host of the moth, Pyrrosia eleagnifolia, is present.

== Life history and larval host plant ==
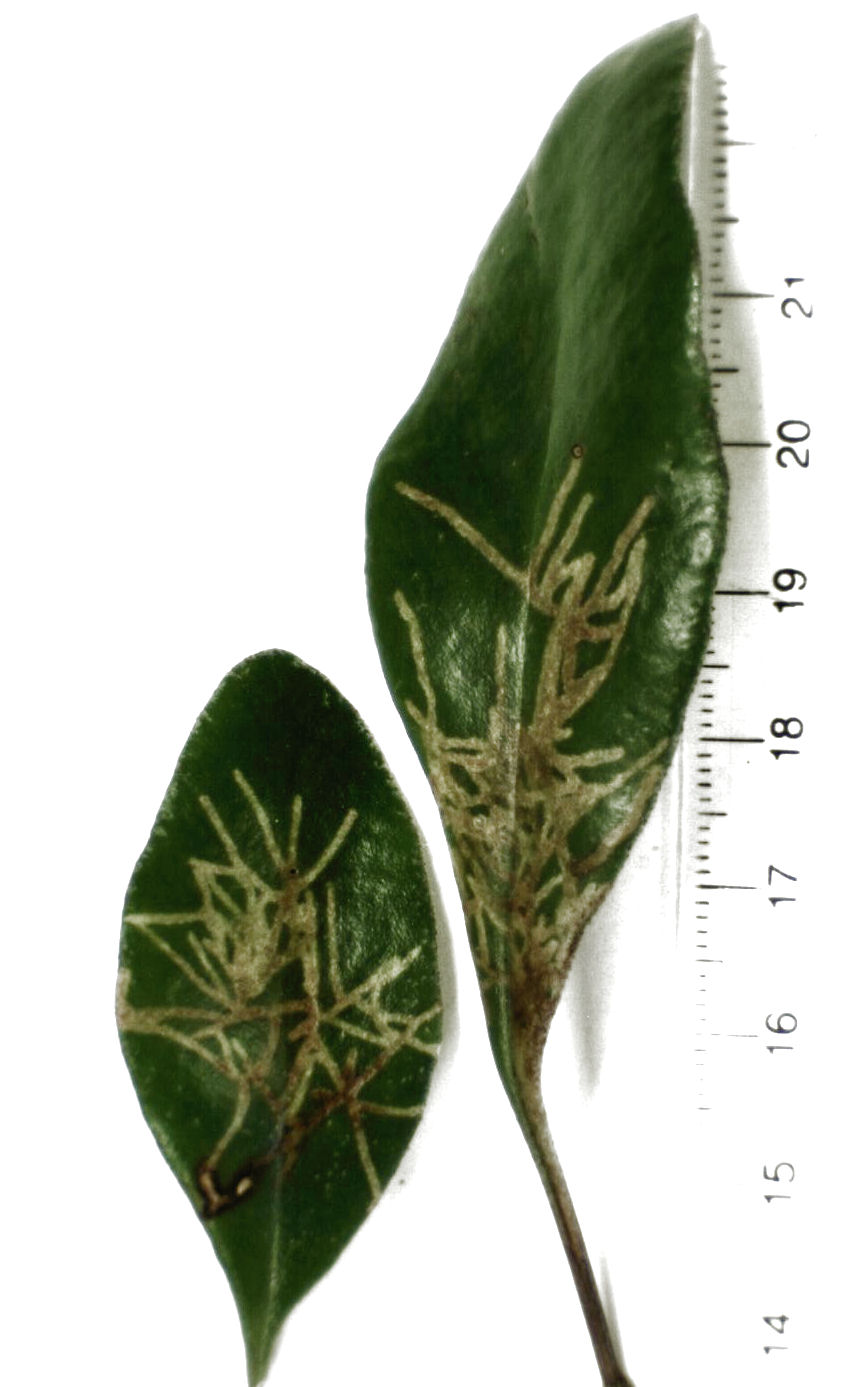
Leaf mines of P. polypodii.

It is assumed that the eggs of this species are laid on the host plant. The larvae feed over winter and spring on P. eleagnifolia, mining the leaves. Young larvae create a number of mines radiating from the base creating a star shape. These mines are filled with frass. After the leaf withers, the larva moves on to another leaf. As the larva grows, the size of the mine also increases. At the final stage of larval development, the older larvae create a large blotch mine in which it pupates. Larvae have been collected in August and September. These larvae pupated in October and emerged as adult moths from the 20th of October until the 1st of December.

== Behaviour ==
The larva will produce black coloured liquid from its mouth if disturbed. The larva will exude a silken thread if shaken from the leaf which they then use to return to their host. When the adult moth is disturbed it runs about in an unpredictable directions adding pauses to its activity. In flight this moth moves erratically and rapidly. The adult moth is on the wing from November to December and is attracted to light.

== Natural enemies ==
It is assumed that insects, spiders and birds feed on the adult moths of this species. Larvae of a species of wasp in the genus Dolichogenidea have been discovered in mines of P. eleagnifolia. The wasp larva inhabits the mine, spinning a silk cocoon and pupating within it. Once developed the adult wasp exits the mine by eating through it.

== Conservation status ==
This species is wide spread and is not regarded as threatened.
