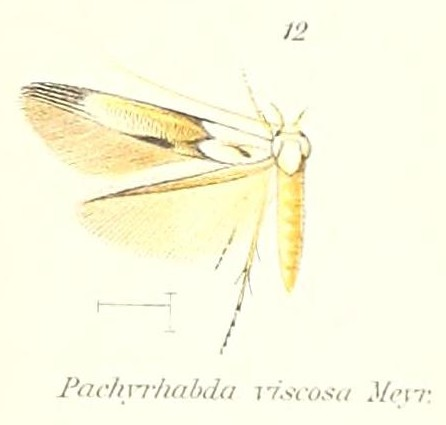
- Pachyrhabda viscosa

Scientific classification
- Kingdom: Animalia
- Phylum: Arthropoda
- Class: Insecta
- Order: Lepidoptera
- Family: Stathmopodidae
- Genus: Pachyrhabda; Meyrick, 1897

= Pachyrhabda =

Genus of moths

Pachyrhabda is a former genus of moths in the family Stathmopodidae. In 2024, this genus was synonymised with Calicotis.

== Formerly included species ==
- Pachyrhabda acroscia Turner, 1941 (from Australia)
- Pachyrhabda adela Turner, 1923 (from Australia)
- Pachyrhabda amianta Meyrick, 1927 (from Samoa)
- Pachyrhabda antinoma Meyrick, 1910 (from Australia & New Zealand)
- Pachyrhabda argyritis Turner, 1941 (from Australia)
- Pachyrhabda bacterias Meyrick, 1913 (from Australia & Sri Lanka)
- Pachyrhabda campylosticha Turner, 1941 (from Australia)
- Pachyrhabda capnoscia Turner, 1923 (from Australia)
- Pachyrhabda citrinacma Meyrick, 1936 (from Taiwan)
- Pachyrhabda dicastis (Meyrick, 1905) (from India & Sri Lanka)
- Pachyrhabda epichlora (Meyrick, 1889) from New Zealand
- Pachyrhabda euphanopis Meyrick, 1927 (from New Hebrides)
- Pachyrhabda fissa Meyrick, 1921 (from Java)
- Pachyrhabda hygrophaes Turner, 1923 (from Australia)
- Pachyrhabda inanis Meyrick, 1936 (from Java)
- Pachyrhabda liriopis Turner, 1941 (from Australia)
- Pachyrhabda phanta Bradley, 1957 (from Rennel island)
- Pachyrhabda punctifera Turner, 1941 (from Australia)
- Pachyrhabda steropodes Meyrick, 1897 (from Australia)
- Pachyrhabda suspecta Meyrick, 1921 (from Java)
- Pachyrhabda tridora Meyrick, 1911 (from the Seychelles)
- Pachyrhabda triplecta Meyrick, 1913 (from South Africa)
- Pachyrhabda tumida Meyrick, 1913 (from Sri Lanka)
- Pachyrhabda unctoria Meyrick, 1911 (from South Africa)
- Pachyrhabda viscosa Meyrick, 1913 (from India)
- Pachyrhabda xanthoscia Turner, 1923 (from Australia)
