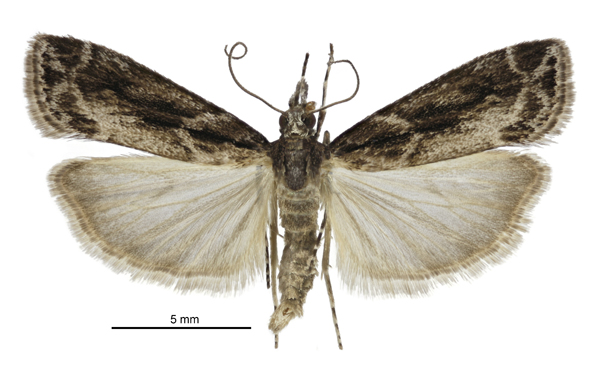
- Male
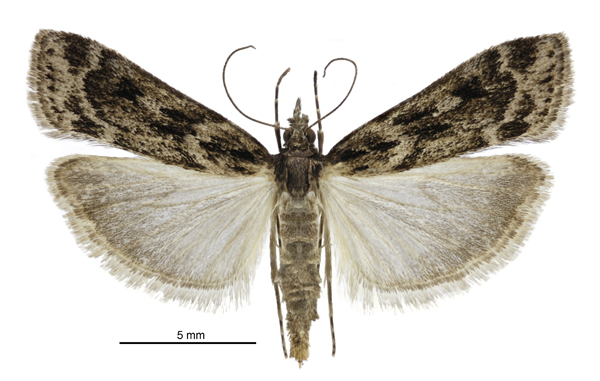
- Female

Scientific classification
- Kingdom: Animalia
- Phylum: Arthropoda
- Clade: Pancrustacea
- Class: Insecta
- Order: Lepidoptera
- Family: Crambidae
- Genus: Scoparia
- Species: S. illota

Binomial name
- Scoparia illota Philpott, 1919

= Scoparia illota =

Species of moth

Scoparia illota is a species of moth in the family Crambidae. It is endemic to New Zealand. The larvae of this species are leaf miners.

== Taxonomy ==
It was described by Alfred Philpott in 1919 using specimens collected at Cromarty in Preservation Inlet as well as specimen collected between Blue Cliffs Beach and the Knife and Steel harbour in Southland. The species was discussed and illustrated by George Hudson in his 1928 book The butterflies and moths of New Zealand. However the placement of this species within the genus Scoparia is in doubt. As a result, this species has also been referred to as Scoparia (s.l.) illota. The holotype specimen is held at the Auckland War Memorial Museum.

== Description ==
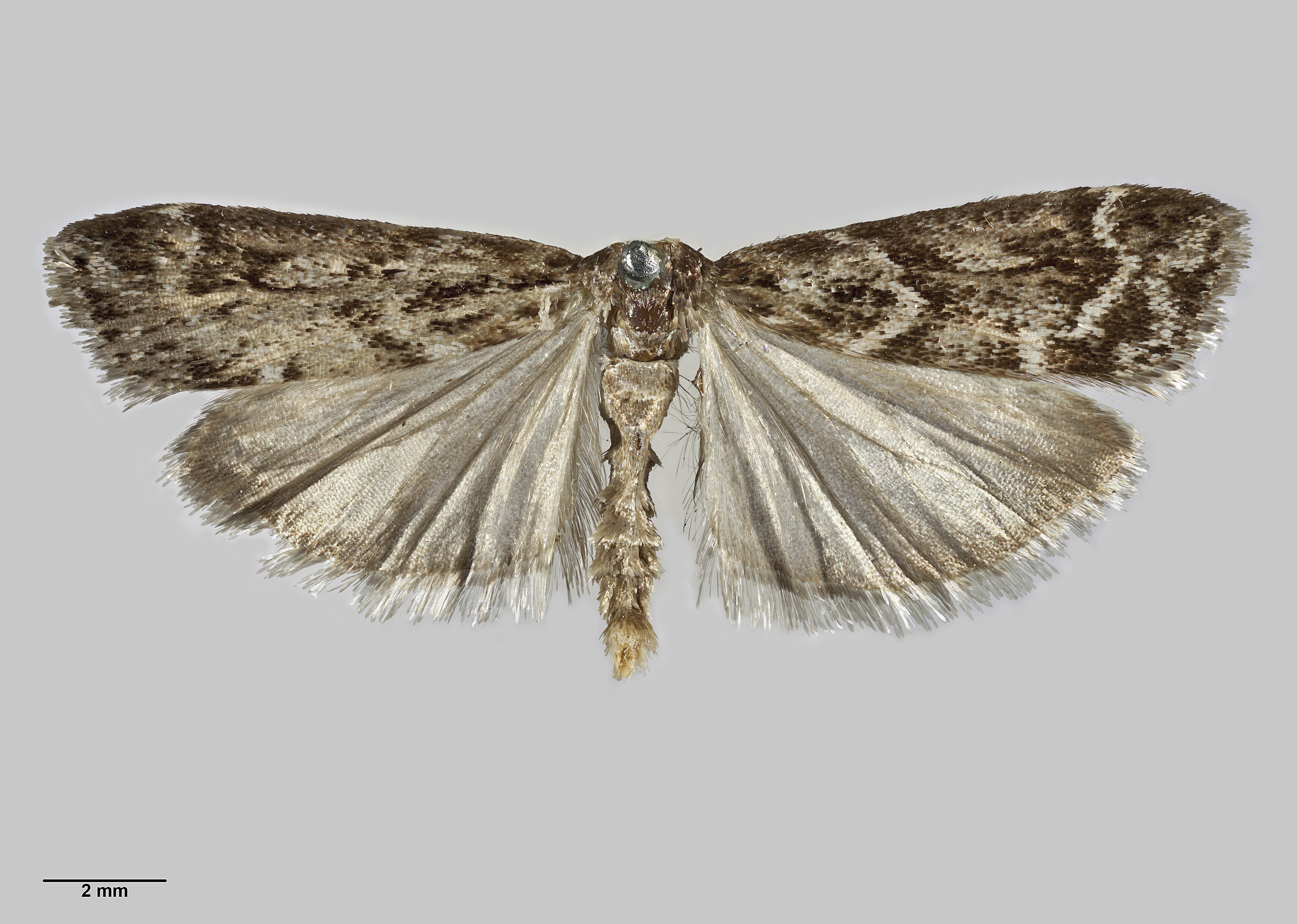
Male holotype specimen

The wingspan is 18–20 mm. The forewings are blackish-fuscous, irrorated with white. Both the first and second line are white. The hindwings are grey. Adults have been recorded on wing in December. As a result of further study of the male genitalia, it has been argued that this species should be placed in the genus Eudonia. Based on this as well as the wing pattern, it has also been postulated that S. illota belongs to the same species as Eudonia pachyerga.

== Distribution ==
This species is endemic to New Zealand. It is found in the forests of southern New Zealand. It is locally common in Thomsons Bush in Invercargill as well on the Cascade Road in South Westland.

== Life stages ==
This species' larvae are leaf miners. They form silk tunnels amongst the leaves of their host plants.

== Host species ==
Pyrrosia eleagnifolia is a host species for the larvae of this moth.
