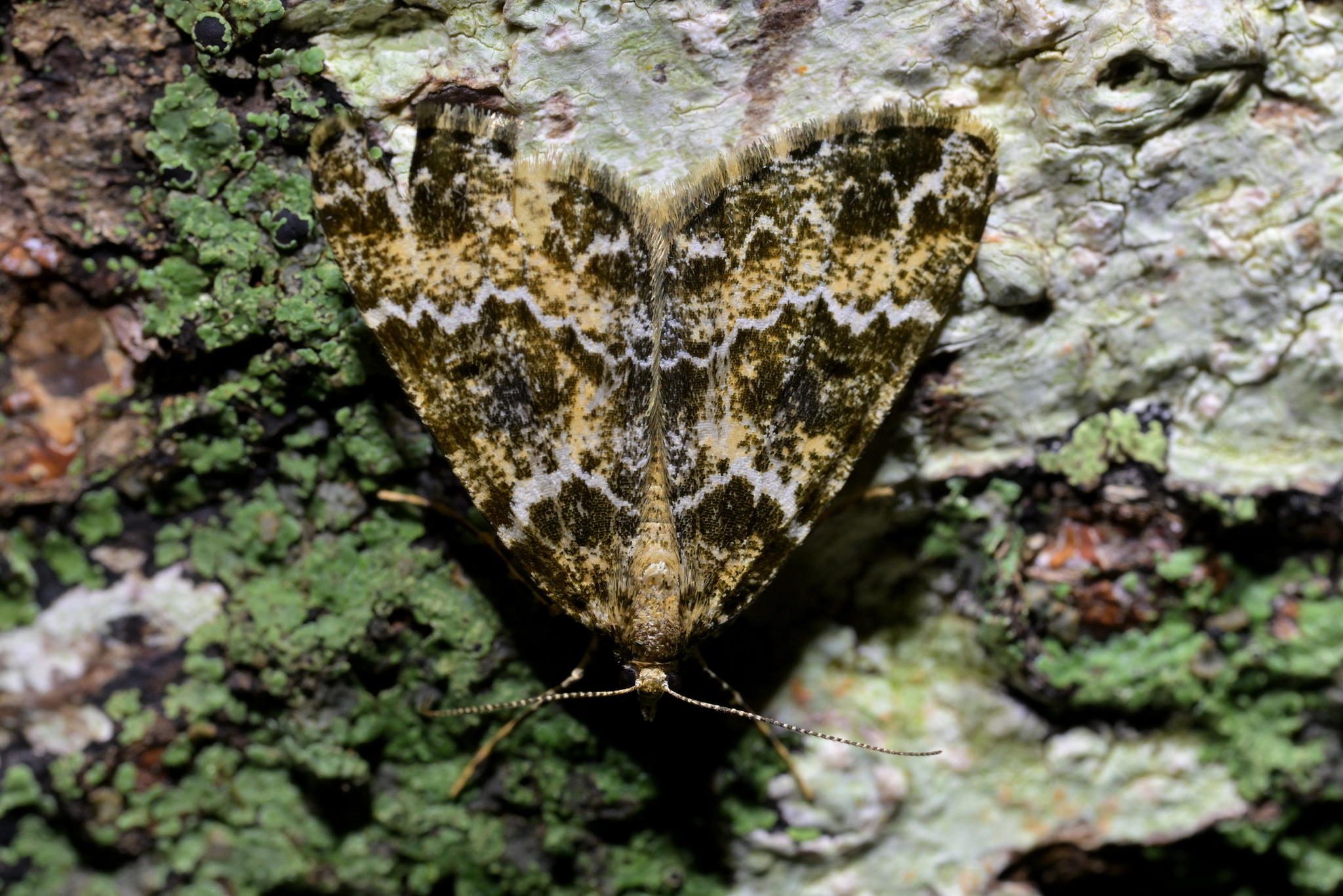

Conservation status
- Not Threatened (NZ TCS)

Scientific classification
- Kingdom: Animalia
- Phylum: Arthropoda
- Clade: Pancrustacea
- Class: Insecta
- Order: Lepidoptera
- Family: Geometridae
- Genus: Pseudocoremia
- Species: P. fluminea

Binomial name
- Pseudocoremia fluminea (Philpott, 1926)

Synonyms
- Selidosema fluminea Philpott, 1926

= Pseudocoremia fluminea =

Species of moth

Pseudocoremia fluminea is a species of moth in the family Geometridae. It is endemic to New Zealand. It is classified as Not Threatened by the Department of Conservation.

== Taxonomy ==
This species was first described by Alfred Philpott in 1926 and named Selidosema fluminea. Philpott and Stewart Lindsay discovered this species at Flora River on the track to Mount Arthur tableland at an altitude of approximately 1000m. In 1928, in his book The Butterflies and Moths of New Zealand, George Hudson discussed the species as a synonym of Selidosema productata. Later in 1928 Philpott stated that the moth he described in 1926 was a separate species explaining that although both productata and fluminea were variable, fluminea could be distinguished from the former species by its shorter antennal pectinations and the difference in the male genitalia. Hudson accepted this and discussed and illustrated the species under the name S. fluminea in his 1939 publication A supplement to the butterflies and moths of New Zealand. In 1988 John S. Dugdale assigned the species to the genus Pseudocoremia. The holotype specimen is held at the New Zealand Arthropod Collection.

== Description ==
Philpott described the adult male of the species as follows:

♂ ♀. 34–38 mm. Head brownish-ochreous. Palpi brown. Antennae strongly bipectinated, five or six apical segments simple, stalk ochreous, pectinations fuscous. Thorax greyish-fuscous. Abdomen ochreous, slightly mixed with brown. Legs ochreous, sprinkled with fuscous, and with tibiae and tarsi broadly annulated with dark fuscous. Forewings triangular, costa moderately and evenly arched, apex obtuse, termen rounded, oblique; dark brownish-fuscous, olive-tinted and strigulated with ochreous; first line from 1/4 costa to 1/3 dorsum, prominent, curved or obtusely angulated at middle, white; posterior to the lower half of this line is a large ochreous patch, sometimes extending across to second line; second line forming a broad hardly-curved white band, more or less tinted, except on inner edge, with ochreous, and with some fuscous strigulation, inner edge very irregular, outer edge entire; subterminal line thin, irregularly dentate, more or less interrupted at middle, white; a series of linear black dots round termen: fringes ochreous mixed with fuscous. Hindwings whitish-ochreous faintly sprinkled with fuscous and with a fuscous discal dot; an interrupted blackish line round termen : fringes pale ochreous.

== Distribution ==
This species is endemic to New Zealand. This species is found all through northwest Nelson to Stockton Plateau. This species has also been recorded in north Canterbury on black beech.

== Biology and host species ==
This species is on the wing in January. The host species of the larvae of this moth is unknown. Adult moths frequent blossoms of Olearia and Hoheria galbrata. P. fluminea is itself a host for a species of wasp within the genus Dolichogenidea.

== Conservation status ==
This species has been classified under the New Zealand Threat Classification system as being Not Threatened.
