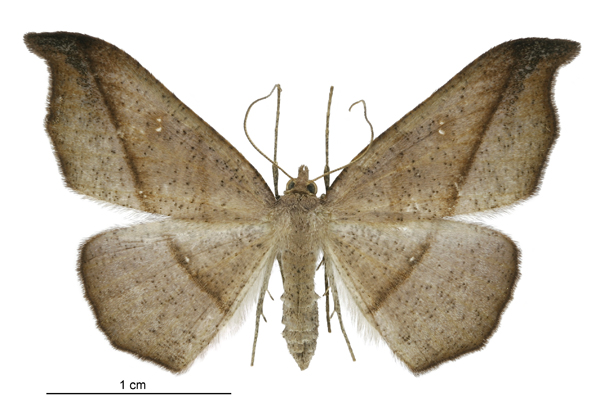
- Female
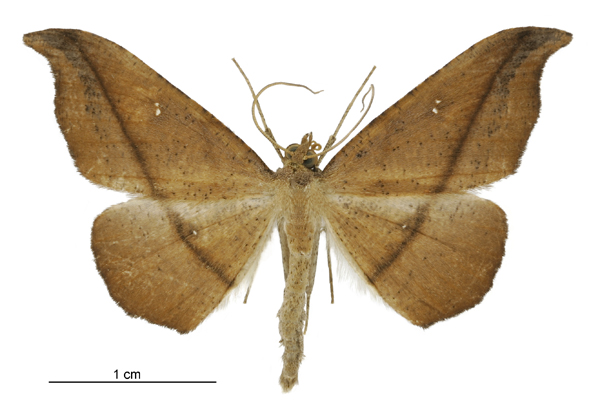
- Male

Scientific classification
- Kingdom: Animalia
- Phylum: Arthropoda
- Clade: Pancrustacea
- Class: Insecta
- Order: Lepidoptera
- Family: Geometridae
- Tribe: Lithinini
- Genus: Sarisa; Fletcher, 1979
- Species: S. muriferata

Binomial name
- Sarisa muriferata (Walker, 1863)

Synonyms
- Gargaphia muriferata Walker, 1863; Drepanodes muriferata (Walker 1863); Panagra ephyraria Walker, 1863; Zanclopteryx cookaria Felder & Rogenhofer, 1875; Zanclopteryx haastaria Felder & Rogenhofer, 1875; Drepanodes neoselena Meyrick, 1909; Gargaphia neoselena (Meyrick, 1909); Drepanodes meriferata (Meyrick, 1909)

= Sarisa (moth) =

Genus of moths

Sarisa is a monotypic moth genus in the family Geometridae and was first described by David Stephen Fletcher in 1979. The genus contains only one species, Sarisa muriferata, the hook-tip fern looper, which is endemic to New Zealand and surrounding islands. This species was described by Francis Walker in 1862. It is widespread in the North and South Islands, and has been recorded from Stewart Island, Big South Cape Island, the Chatham Islands and the Auckland Islands.

== Taxonomy ==
The genus Sarisa was first described by Fletcher in 1979. Sarisa is a replacement name for the genus Gargaphia, Walker 1863 which was preoccupied by Gargaphia, Stål, 1862. The only species in this genus, S. muriferata, was originally described by Francis Walker in 1863 and named Gargaphia muriferata. The female holotype is held at the Natural History Museum, London.

== Description ==
Full-grown larvae are approximately 30 mm long.

Adults have functional mouthparts and are attracted to nectar sources.

== Distribution ==
This species is endemic to New Zealand and its surrounding islands.

== Behaviour ==
The larvae are active in summer and autumn. They hide during the day in leaf litter and are active at night feeding on host plants. If disturbed a larva will fall to the ground and will then attempt to bury itself in the leaf litter. This type of evasive behaviour is also seen in adults of the species. The moth will drop to the ground when disturbed or attacked, with wings held motionless. The species overwinters in the pupal stage. The adult moth can be found on the wing all year round. There are probably two generations per year in the North and South Islands, with adults recorded from September to March. At the southern limit of its range there is probably one generation per year, flying during January and February.

== Host species ==
The larvae have been recorded feeding on Microsorum pustulatum and Dicksonia fibrosa. They have also been observed feeding on the leaves and sori of Pyrrosia eleagnifolia.
