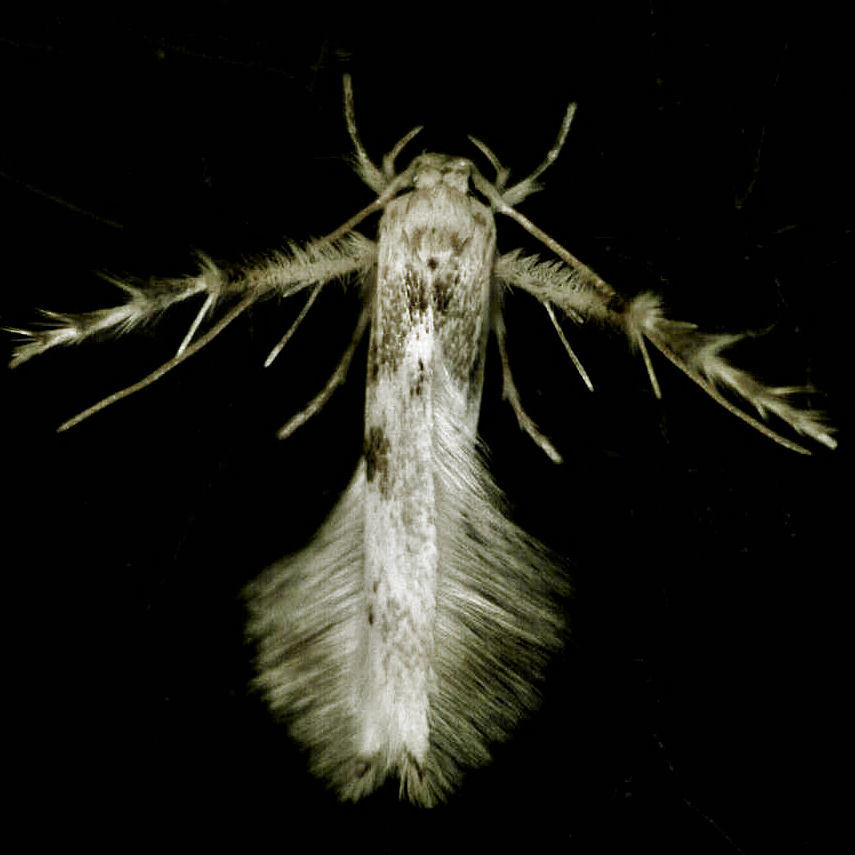

Scientific classification
- Kingdom: Animalia
- Phylum: Arthropoda
- Clade: Pancrustacea
- Class: Insecta
- Order: Lepidoptera
- Family: Stathmopodidae
- Genus: Calicotis
- Species: C. crucifera

Binomial name
- Calicotis crucifera Meyrick, 1889

= Calicotis crucifera =

Species of moth

Calicotis crucifera, the leather-leaf spore-eater, is a moth of the family Stathmopodidae. It was first described by Edward Meyrick in 1889. It is found in New Zealand, Australia and China. This species inhabits both native bush and domestic gardens where its hosts can be found. In New Zealand and Australia the larvae feed only on the spores of the fern Pyrrosia eleagnifolia. In China the recorded larval host plant is Platycerium grande. In New Zealand adults are on the wing from October to May.

== Taxonomy ==
This species was first described by Edward Meyrick in 1889. It is the type species of Calicotis by original monotypy. George Hudson discussed and illustrated this species in his 1928 book The butterflies and moths of New Zealand. The female lectotype, collected in New Plymouth by Meyrick, is held at the Natural History Museum, London.

== Description ==
Larva

Live adult

Meyrick originally described the adults of this species as follows:

♂♀. 9-12mm. Head, palpi, antennae, thorax, abdomen, and legs very pale whitish-ochreous ; terminal joint of palpi with a dark fuscous line on outer edge ; anterior legs suffused with blackish in front, posterior legs spotted with black on apex of joints. Forewings elongate, very narrow, broadest near base, long-pointed ; ochreous-whitish, more or less irregularly suffused or blotched with ochreous ; a small cloudy dark fuscous spot on inner margin near base, and another on costa slightly before middle, both in female sometimes almost obsolete ; an apical black dot : cilia grey-whitish. Hindwings whitish-grey ; cilia grey-whitish.

Meyrick also described the larva of this species as follows:

Larva 16-legged, moderately stout, cylindrical, active ; whitish flesh-colour, or whitish; head pale whitish-brown.

The mature larva of C. crucifera are approximately 6mm long and are a white colour, plump with a pale brown head.

== Distribution ==
This species is native to both New Zealand and Australia. In New Zealand it is found throughout the country. In Australia it is found in Queensland, New South Wales and Victoria. In 2015 this species was also recorded from China where it has been observed in Anhui, Guizhou and Hubei.

== Habitat and host plant ==
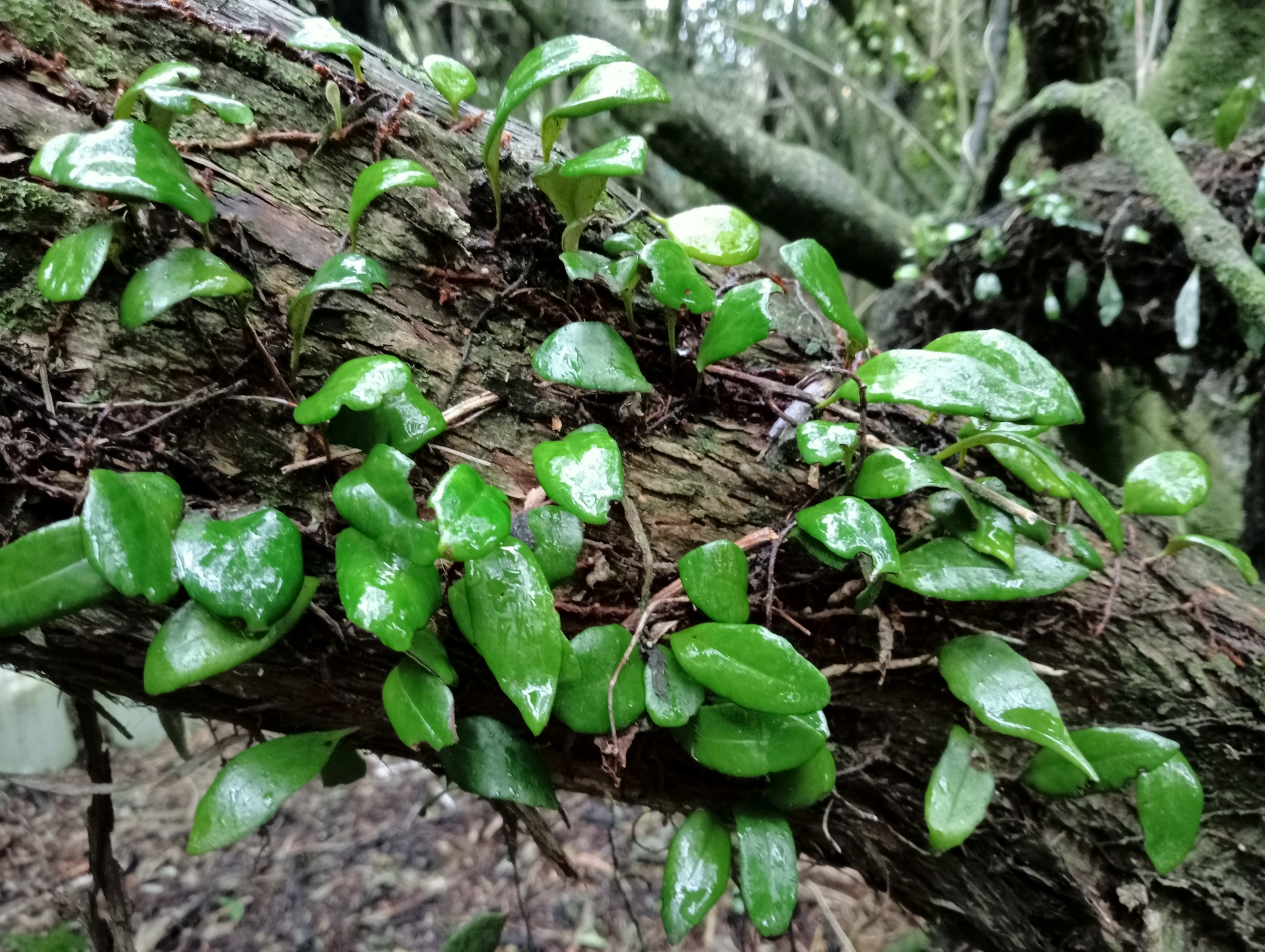
Larval host plant P. eleagnifolia.

C. crucifer inhabits both native bush and domestic gardens. The larvae feed on the spores of the fern Pyrrosia eleagnifolia. In China the larva host is recorded as Platycerium grande.

== Behaviour ==
The larvae can be observed on the underneath of the fronds of its host species. They build silk tubes disguised with fern spore dust and white frond hair and feed on the fern spores of their host plant. Larvae can be seen most months of the year. In New Zealand adults are on the wing from October to May.
