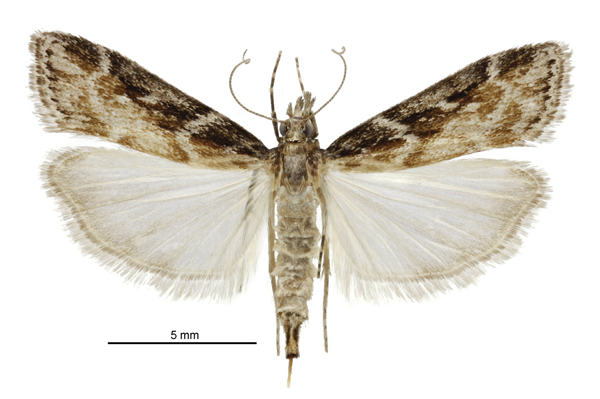
- Female
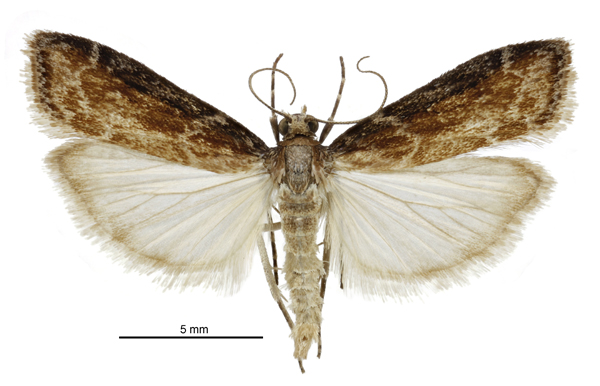
- Male

Scientific classification
- Kingdom: Animalia
- Phylum: Arthropoda
- Class: Insecta
- Order: Lepidoptera
- Family: Crambidae
- Genus: Scoparia
- Species: S. molifera

Binomial name
- Scoparia molifera Meyrick, 1926

Synonyms
- Scoparia s.l. molifera Meyrick, 1926

= Scoparia molifera =

Species of moth, endemic to New Zealand

Scoparia molifera, also known as the leather-leaf Scoparia, is a species of moth of the family Crambidae. This species was first described by Edward Meyrick in 1926 and is endemic to New Zealand. It can be found in the North and South Islands. The larvae of this species make silk tunnels from which they mine the leaves of their host, the leather-leaf fern Pyrrosia eleagnifolia. Adult moths are on wing from December to February and are attracted to light.

== Taxonomy ==
This species was described by Edward Meyrick in 1926 using a specimen collected by George Hudson on the banks of the Manawatu River in Ashhurst and named Scoparia molifera. Hudson discussed and illustrated this species in his 1928 book The butterflies and moths of New Zealand. John S. Dugdale discussed this species under the name S. molifera in his 1988 catalogue of New Zealand Lepidoptera. However the placement of this species within the genus Scoparia is in doubt. As a result, this species has also been referred to as Scoparia (s.l.) molifera. The female holotype specimen is held at the Natural History Museum, London.

== Description ==
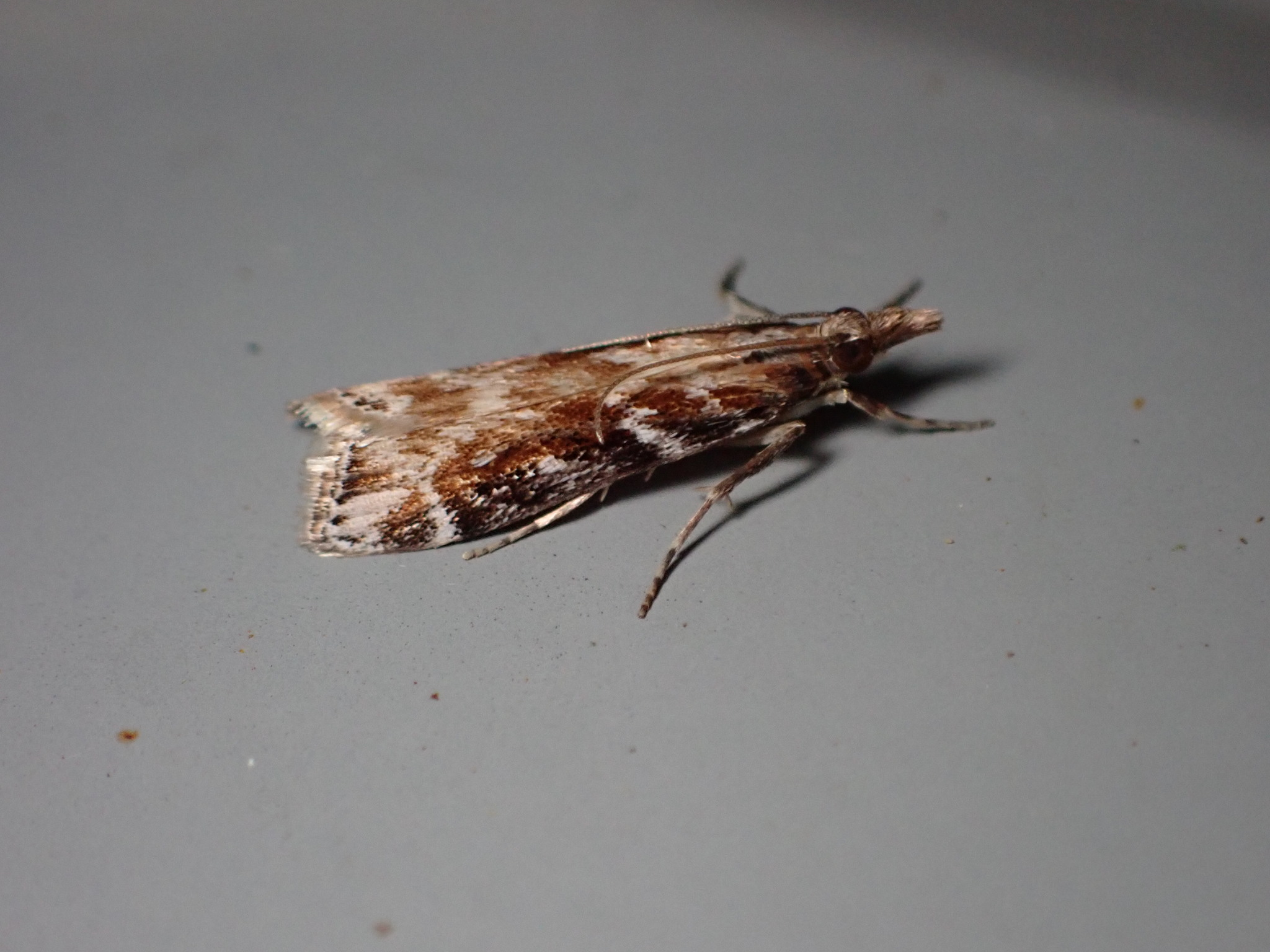
Observation of live S. molifera.

When mature, the larva of S. molifera are approximately 20 mm long and are spotted.

Meyrick described the adult male of this species as follows:

♀ 20 mm. Head and thorax light-brownish, shoulders mixed dark fuscous. Palpi 3, brownish, base white. Forewings elongate rather dilated (rather narrower than submarginalis), termen nearly straight, somewhat oblique; brown, somewhat paler towards dorsum, costal third suffused dark fuscous, narrowed to apex; lines whitish, first at 1/3, obtusely angulated below middle, second at 4/5, indented towards costa and near dorsum, excurved between these, subterminal incurved on median third and confluent centrally with second; orbicular and discal spots confluent to form a broad dark-brown streak adjacent to dark-fuscous costal area, cut by first line and extending before it half-way to base, claviform elongate, dark brown, confluent with this on posterior edge of first line; dorsal third irrorated white between first and second lines; a slender dark-fuscous terminal shade including a waved white marginal line: cilia pale-greyish, an interrupted fuscous median line on upper part of termen. Hindwings 1 1/3, whitish-grey-ochreous; cilia ochreous-whitish.

Meyrick regarded this as a very distinct species.

== Distribution ==
This species is endemic to New Zealand. This species can be found in the North and South Islands and has been collected at Cape Palliser in the Wellington Region, in the Canterbury Region including the Banks Peninsula, in the Otago Region and in The Catlins.

== Behaviour ==
The larvae of this species make silk tunnels from which they mine the leaves of their host. Larvae do not camouflage their feeding damage. The larvae pupate within these tunnels surrounded by the silk, mined leaves, and frass. The larvae can be found from June to August. Adults have been recorded on wing from December to February. Adults are attracted to light.

== Host species ==
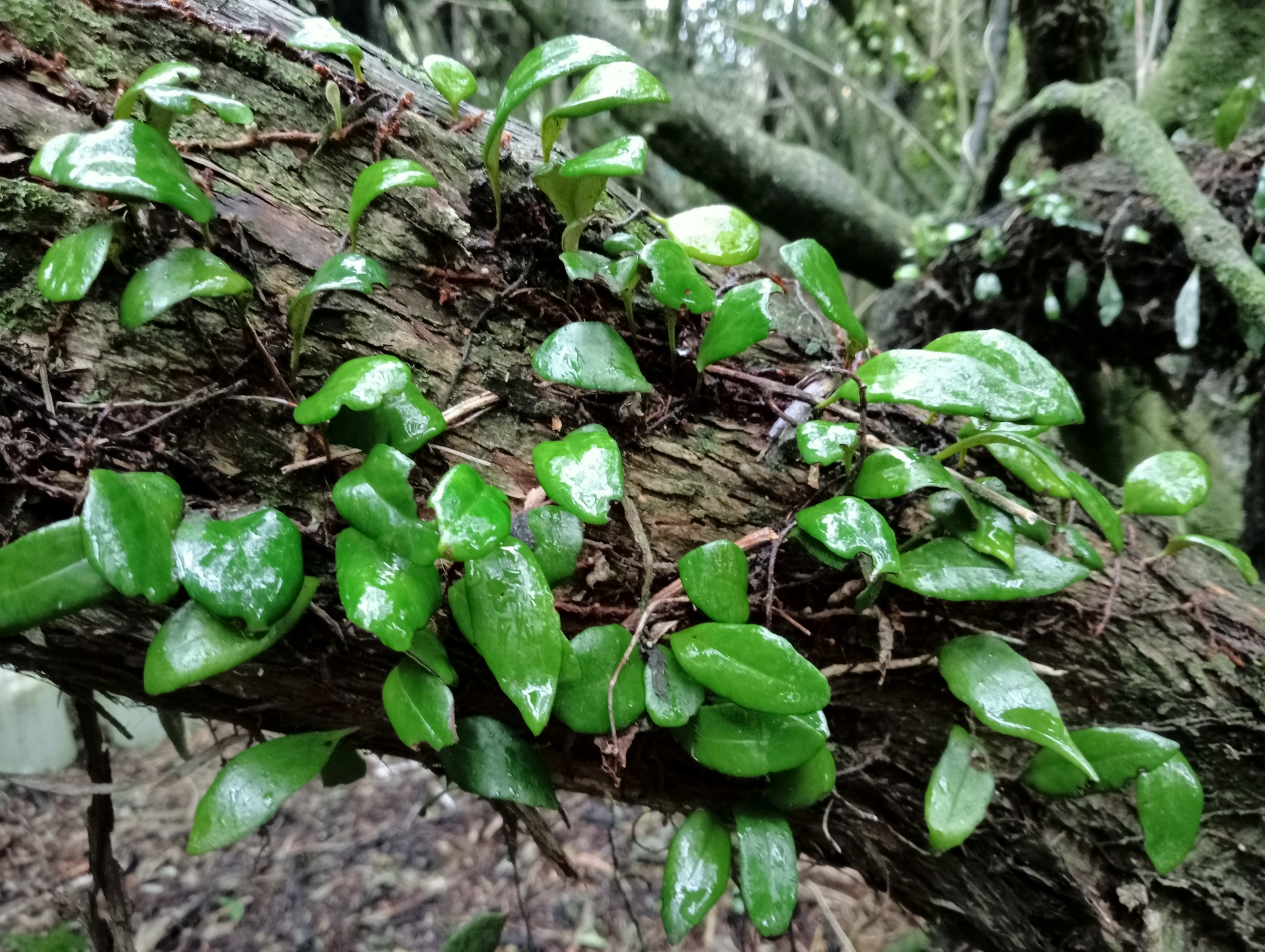
Pyrrosia eleagnifolia, the larval host

The larval host of this species is the leather-leaf fern Pyrrosia eleagnifolia.
