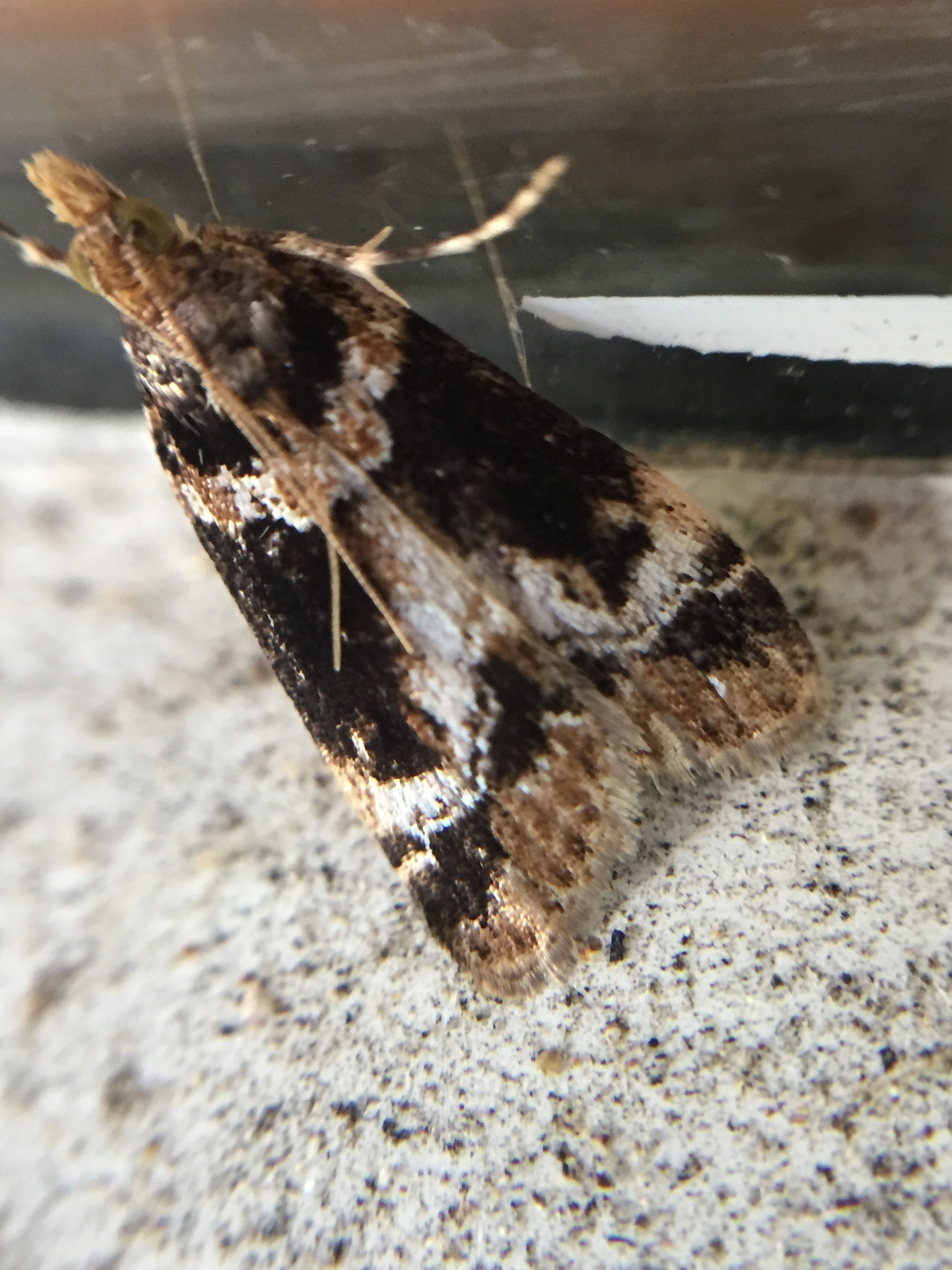

Scientific classification
- Kingdom: Animalia
- Phylum: Arthropoda
- Class: Insecta
- Order: Lepidoptera
- Family: Crambidae
- Genus: Eudonia
- Species: E. zophochlaena

Binomial name
- Eudonia zophochlaena (Meyrick, 1923)

Synonyms
- Scoparia zophochlaena Meyrick, 1923; Scoparia zophoclaena Meyrick, 1923 (misspelling); Eudonia zophoclaena (Meyrick, 1923)

= Eudonia zophochlaena =

Species of moth

Eudonia zophochlaena is a moth in the family Crambidae. It was described by Edward Meyrick in 1923. It is endemic to New Zealand. It has been hypothesised that this species is a North Island endemic. The adults of this species are on the wing from December until February. The larvae of this species are leaf miners of the leather-leaf fern Pyrrosia eleagnifolia.

== Taxonomy ==
This species was first described by Edward Meyrick in 1923 using a specimen collected by George Hudson in Takapuna, Auckland and named Scoparia zophochlaena. In 1928 George Hudson described and illustrated this species under that name. In 1988 John S. Dugdale discussed this species using the epithet zophoclaena and placed the species in the genus Eudonia. This placement was accepted in 2010 in the New Zealand Inventory of Biodiversity which listed the species under the name Eudonia zophochlaena. The male holotype is held at the Natural History Museum, London.

== Description ==
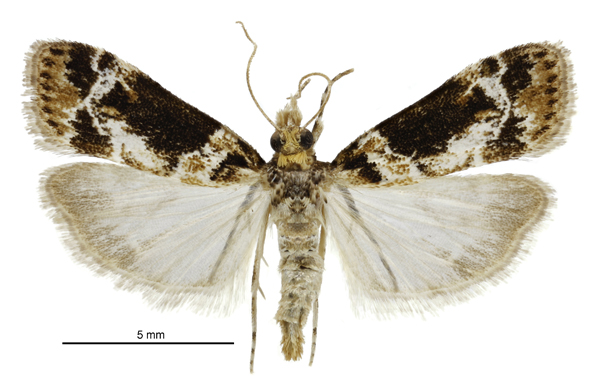
Eudonia zophochlaena female

Meyrick described the male adult of this species as follows:

♂ 18 mm. Head ferruginous-ochreous, face fuscous. Palpi 2 1/4, light grey mixed with whitish. Antennal ciliations 1/4. Thorax dark fuscous. Abdomen ochreous-grey-whitish, anal tuft whitish-ochreous. Forewings elongate-triangular, termen gently rounded, faintly sinuate beneath apex, somewhat oblique; light ochreous-brownish; first line double, irregular, white, from 1/5 of costa to 1/3 of dorsum, suffusedly blotched with ferruginous-ochreous above and below middle, basal area within this almost wholly black; second line fine, white, from 4/5 of costa to 3/4 of dorsum, gently excurved, indented at 1/4 from costa, nearly preceded by a more curved fascia of whitish suffusion broadest towards extremities, space between these blackish towards costa; space between first line and the whitish fascia forming a trapezoidal costal blotch of blackish suffusion, its anterior lower angle resting on dorsum beyond first line and posterior on middle of fascia; second line followed by a blackish transverse blotch from costa hardly reaching half across wing, and some irregular blackish marking towards dorsum; an almost terminal series of small roundish spots of blackish irroration: cilia whitish-grey, with grey subbasal shade. Hindwings ochreous-whitish, with an apical blotch of light-grey suffusion; cilia whitish, with grey subbasal line.

Meyrick regarded this species as distinctive as it has large black patches on its forewings.

== Distribution ==
This species is endemic to New Zealand. Brian Patrick hypothesised that this species is a North Island endemic as it has been observed in Auckland as well as in the Waikato, Hawkes Bay, Manawatū-Whanganui and Wellington regions.

== Behaviour ==
Adults have been recorded on wing from December until February. Adults are active at night and are attracted to light.

== Hosts ==
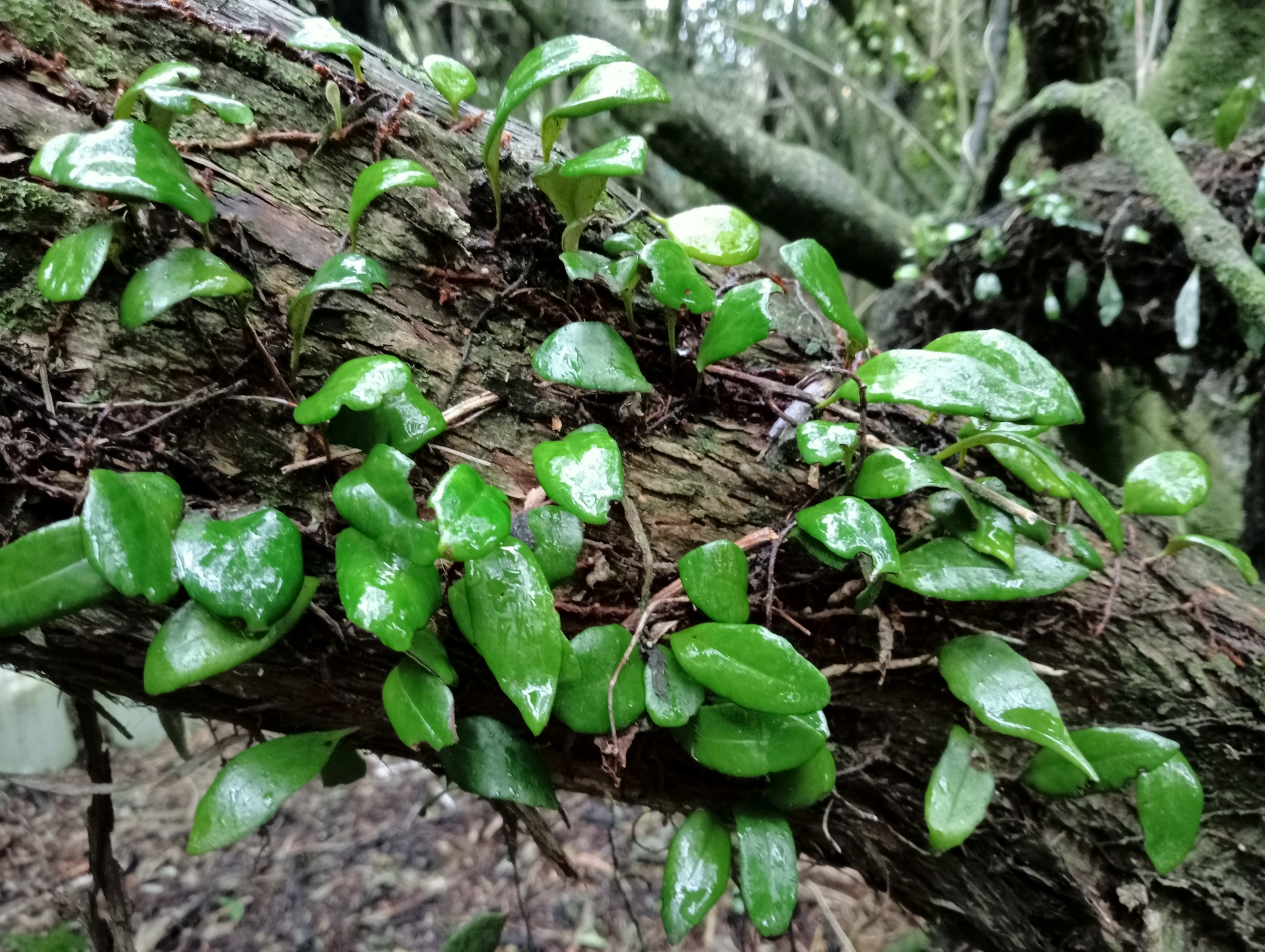
Pyrrosia eleagnifolia, the larval host

The larval host of this species is the leather-leaf fern Pyrrosia eleagnifolia. The larvae of this species travel from leaf to leaf via the silk tunnels they make, mining the leaves as they move. The larvae pupate within these tunnels surrounded by the silk, mined leaves, and frass.
