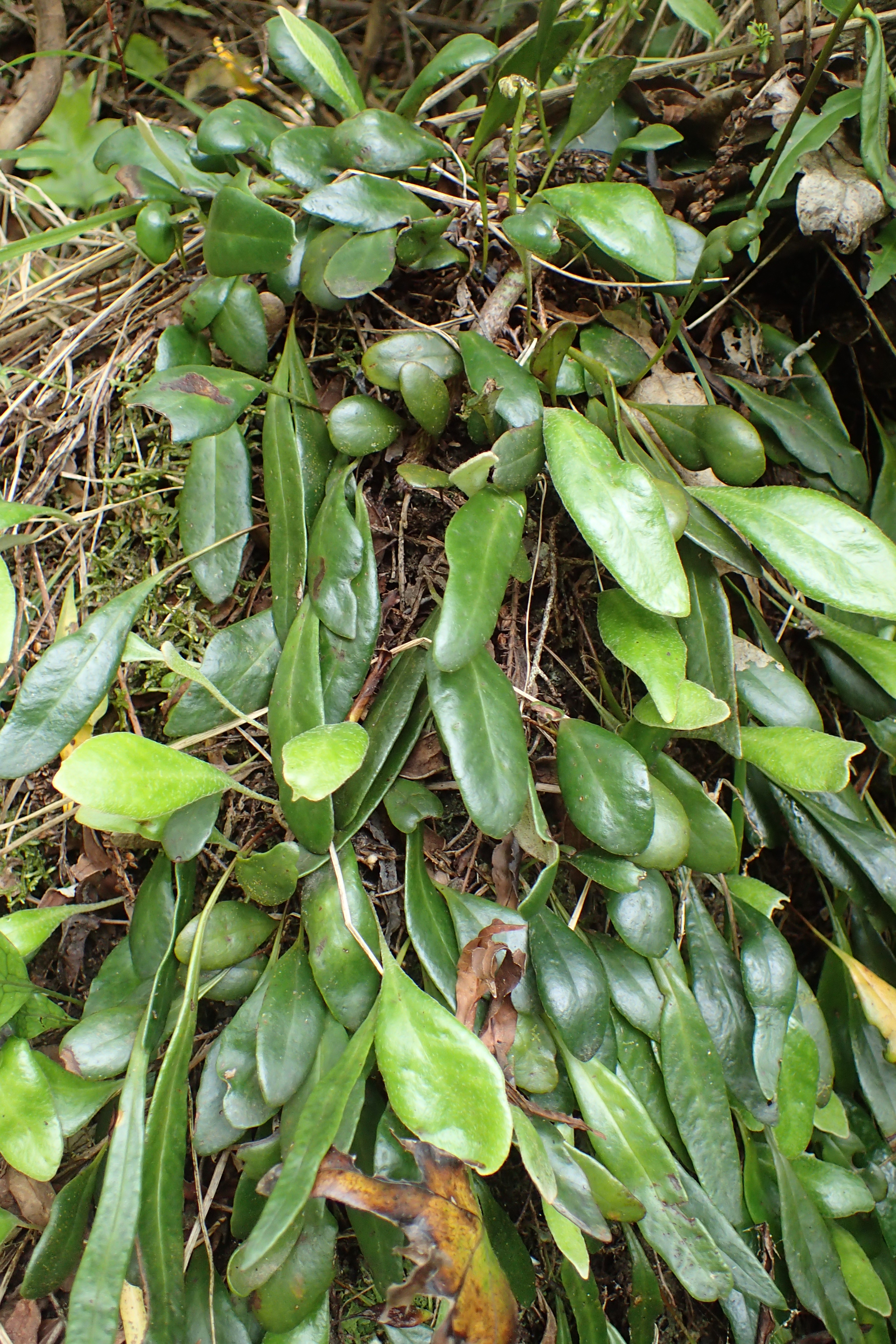

Scientific classification
- Kingdom: Plantae
- Clade: Tracheophytes
- Division: Polypodiophyta
- Class: Polypodiopsida
- Order: Polypodiales
- Suborder: Polypodiineae
- Family: Polypodiaceae
- Genus: Pyrrosia
- Species: P. eleagnifolia

Binomial name
- Pyrrosia eleagnifolia (Bory) Hovenkamp

Synonyms
- Polypodium eleagnifolium Bory; Polypodium rupestre var. sinuatum Colenso; Polypodium stellatum Vahl; Polypodium serpens G.Forst.; Niphobolus bicolor Kaulf.; Polypodium rupestre R.Br

= Pyrrosia eleagnifolia =

Species of fern

Pyrrosia eleagnifolia, commonly known as the leather-leaf fern, or ota in Māori, is a climbing fern endemic to New Zealand. P. eleagnifolia has thick, fleshy rounded leaves, and grows both on the ground and as an epiphyte.

== Etymology ==
This species was originally confused with Pyrrosia serpens, a Pacific species. The specific epithet eleagnifolia refers to the leaf appearance, and comes from elaeagnus (olive) and folium (leaf).

== Description ==
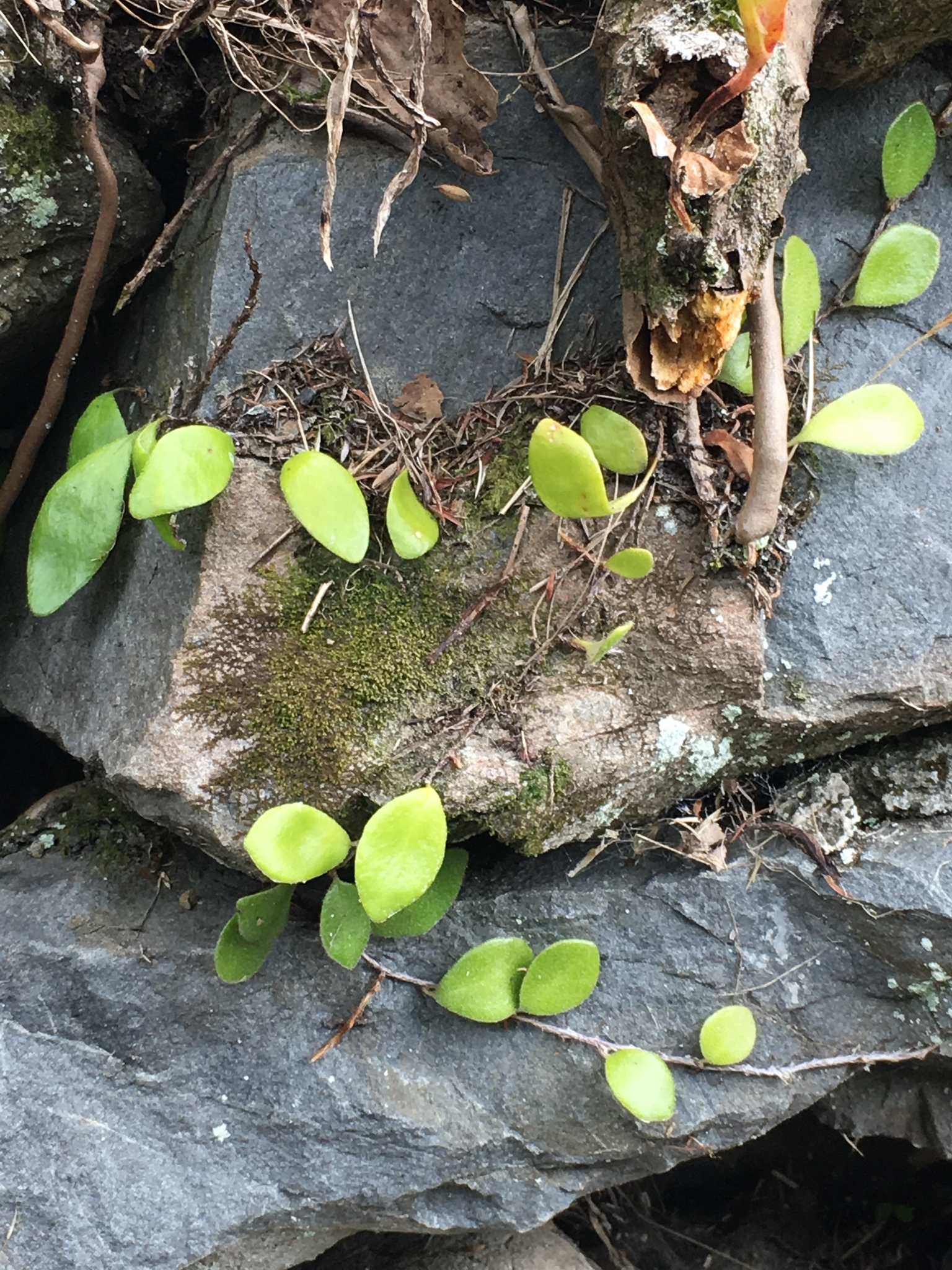
P. eleagnifolia growing on rocks in Wellington Botanic Garden

Leather-leaf fern has thick, undivided fronds that are rounded and extremely variable in length – they can be long and thin, up to 20 cm in length, or short and broad (2 cm, rarely 3 cm wide). The fronds grow on long creeping rhizomes. Sterile fronds are generally shorter and broader than fertile ones. The fronds are thick and leathery, smooth and rounded, with blunt ends. They are dark green above and abundantly covered with light-brown irregularly-branched hairs underneath.

== Distribution ==
P. eleagnifolia is found throughout New Zealand, from the Kermadecs through to Stewart Island and the Chatham Islands. It is a very adaptable and durable species, able to tolerate dry conditions, and grows either as an epiphyte on trees (native or introduced) or rocks, from the coast to the mountains. It is less common in the south of New Zealand, especially in Central Otago.

== Ecology ==
=== Pests and diseases ===
Larvae from several moth species have been observed feeding on the leaves and sori of P. eleagnifolia. These include Sarisa muriferata, Calicotis crucifera, Philocryptica polypodii, Apoctena taipana, Eudonia zophochlaena, Scoparia illota and Scoparia molifera.
