= List of Dolichogenidea species =

These 366 species belong to the genus Dolichogenidea, braconid wasps.

== Dolichogenidea species ==
- Dolichogenidea aberrantenna Liu & Chen, 2018
- Dolichogenidea absona (Muesebeck, 1965)
- Dolichogenidea acratos (Nixon, 1967)
- Dolichogenidea acrobasidis (Muesebeck, 1921)
- Dolichogenidea acron (Nixon, 1967)
- Dolichogenidea aegeriphagous Liu & Chen, 2018
- Dolichogenidea agamedes (Nixon, 1965)
- Dolichogenidea agilis (Ashmead, 1905)
- Dolichogenidea agilla (Nixon, 1972)
- Dolichogenidea agonoxenae (Fullaway, 1941)
- Dolichogenidea alaria (Kotenko, 1986)
- Dolichogenidea albipennis (Nees, 1834)
- Dolichogenidea alejandromasisi Fernandez-Triana & Boudreault, 2019
- Dolichogenidea alophogaster Liu & Chen, 2019
- Dolichogenidea altithoracica Liu & Chen, 2019
- Dolichogenidea aluella (Nixon, 1967)
- Dolichogenidea alutacea (Balevski, 1980)
- Dolichogenidea amaris (Nixon, 1967)
- Dolichogenidea anarsiae (Faure & Alabouvette, 1924)
- Dolichogenidea ancylotergita Liu & Chen, 2018
- Dolichogenidea angelagonzalezae Fernandez-Triana & Boudreault, 2019
- Dolichogenidea angularis Song, Chen & Yang, 2006
- Dolichogenidea annularis (Haliday, 1834)
- Dolichogenidea anterocava Liu & Chen, 2019
- Dolichogenidea anteruga Liu & Chen, 2018
- Dolichogenidea apicurvus Liu & Chen, 2019
- Dolichogenidea appellator (Telenga, 1949)
- Dolichogenidea argiope (Nixon, 1965)
- Dolichogenidea artissima (Papp, 1971)
- Dolichogenidea artusicarina Song & Chen, 2004
- Dolichogenidea ashoka Rousse, 2013
- Dolichogenidea atarsi Liu & Chen, 2019
- Dolichogenidea ate (Nixon, 1973)
- Dolichogenidea atreus (Nixon, 1973)
- Dolichogenidea azovica (Kotenko, 1986)
- Dolichogenidea bakeri (Wilkinson, 1932)
- Dolichogenidea bambusae (Wilkinson, 1928)
- Dolichogenidea banksi (Viereck, 1911)
- Dolichogenidea baoris (Wilkinson, 1930)
- Dolichogenidea basiflava (Papp, 1974)
- Dolichogenidea benevolens (Papp, 1973)
- Dolichogenidea benkevitshi (Kotenko, 1986)
- Dolichogenidea bersa (Papp, 1976)
- Dolichogenidea betheli (Viereck, 1911)
- Dolichogenidea bicolor Song & Chen, 2004
- Dolichogenidea biconcava Liu & Chen, 2018
- Dolichogenidea bilecikensis Inanç & Cetin Erdogan, 2004
- Dolichogenidea bimacula Song & Chen, 2004
- Dolichogenidea biplagae (Fischer, 1968)
- Dolichogenidea biroi (Szépligeti, 1905)
- Dolichogenidea bisulcata (Cameron, 1909)
- Dolichogenidea bonbonensis Fagan-Jeffries & Austin, 2019
- Dolichogenidea borysthenica (Kotenko, 1986)
- Dolichogenidea brabyi Fagan-Jeffries & Austin, 2019
- Dolichogenidea bres (Nixon, 1973)
- Dolichogenidea breviattenuata Liu & Chen, 2019
- Dolichogenidea brevicarinata Chen & Song, 2004
- Dolichogenidea brevifacialis Liu & Chen, 2018
- Dolichogenidea breviventris (Ratzeburg, 1848)
- Dolichogenidea britannica (Wilkinson, 1941)
- Dolichogenidea broadi Rousse, 2013
- Dolichogenidea bushnelli (Muesebeck, 1933)
- Dolichogenidea cacoeciae (Riley, 1881)
- Dolichogenidea californica (Muesebeck, 1921)
- Dolichogenidea cameroonensis Walker, 1994
- Dolichogenidea candidata (Haliday, 1834)
- Dolichogenidea caniae (Wilkinson, 1928)
- Dolichogenidea carborugosa Liu & Chen, 2019
- Dolichogenidea carlosmanuelrodriguezi Fernandez-Triana & Boudreault, 2019
- Dolichogenidea carposinae (Wilkinson, 1938)
- Dolichogenidea catonix (Shenefelt, 1972)
- Dolichogenidea cauda Song & Chen, 2004
- Dolichogenidea celsa (Papp, 1975)
- Dolichogenidea cerialis (Nixon, 1976)
- Dolichogenidea changbaiensis Liu & Chen, 2018
- Dolichogenidea cheles (Nixon, 1972)
- Dolichogenidea chrysis (Nixon, 1973)
- Dolichogenidea cinerosa (Papp, 1971)
- Dolichogenidea cinnarae Gupta, Lokhande & Soman, 2013
- Dolichogenidea claniae (You & Zhou, 1990)
- Dolichogenidea clausa Liu & Chen, 2019
- Dolichogenidea clavata (Provancher, 1881)
- Dolichogenidea coequata (Nixon, 1967)
- Dolichogenidea coffea (Wilkinson, 1930)
- Dolichogenidea colchica (Tobias, 1976)
- Dolichogenidea coleophorae (Wilkinson, 1938)
- Dolichogenidea concentrica Liu & Chen, 2018
- Dolichogenidea coniferae (Haliday, 1834)
- Dolichogenidea coniferoides (Papp, 1972)
- Dolichogenidea conpuncta Liu & Chen, 2019
- Dolichogenidea contergita Song & Chen, 2004
- Dolichogenidea cordiae Ahmad, 2019 & Pandey
- Dolichogenidea coretas (Nixon, 1965)
- Dolichogenidea corvina (Reinhard, 1880)
- Dolichogenidea crassa Liu & Chen, 2019
- Dolichogenidea credne (Nixon, 1973)
- Dolichogenidea cucurbita Liu & Chen, 2019
- Dolichogenidea cultriformis Song & Chen, 2004
- Dolichogenidea cyamon (Nixon, 1967)
- Dolichogenidea cyane (Nixon, 1965)
- Dolichogenidea cytherea (Nixon, 1972)
- Dolichogenidea decora (Haliday, 1834)
- Dolichogenidea diaphantus (Nixon, 1965)
- Dolichogenidea dilecta (Haliday, 1834)
- Dolichogenidea dioryctriphagous Liu & Chen, 2018
- Dolichogenidea diparopsidis (Lyle, 1927)
- Dolichogenidea discreta (Szépligeti, 1914)
- Dolichogenidea dolichocephalus (Muesebeck, 1921)
- Dolichogenidea drusilla (Nixon, 1972)
- Dolichogenidea dryas (Nixon, 1965)
- Dolichogenidea earterus (Wilkinson, 1930)
- Dolichogenidea eleagnellae (Tobias, 1976)
- Dolichogenidea emarginata (Nees, 1834)
- Dolichogenidea ensiformis (Ratzeburg, 1844)
- Dolichogenidea ensiger (Say, 1836)
- Dolichogenidea erasmi (Nixon, 1972)
- Dolichogenidea erdoesi (Papp, 1973)
- Dolichogenidea erevanica (Tobias, 1976)
- Dolichogenidea eros (Wilkinson, 1932)
- Dolichogenidea eucalypti Austin & Allen, 1989
- Dolichogenidea evadne (Nixon, 1955)
- Dolichogenidea evonymellae (Bouché, 1834)
- Dolichogenidea excellentis Liu & Chen, 2019
- Dolichogenidea exilis (Haliday, 1834)
- Dolichogenidea fakhrulhajiae (Mahdihassan, 1925)
- Dolichogenidea falcator (Ratzeburg, 1852)
- Dolichogenidea faucula (Nixon, 1972)
- Dolichogenidea fernandeztrianai Abdoli & Talebi, 2019
- Dolichogenidea ficicola Donaldson, 1991
- Dolichogenidea finchi Fagan-Jeffries & Austin, 2018
- Dolichogenidea flavigastrula Chen & Song, 2004
- Dolichogenidea flavostriata (Papp, 1977)
- Dolichogenidea flexisulcus Liu & Chen, 2019
- Dolichogenidea flexitergita Liu & Chen, 2019
- Dolichogenidea fluctisulcus Liu & Chen, 2019
- Dolichogenidea forrestae Fagan-Jeffries & Austin, 2019
- Dolichogenidea frustrata (Papp, 1975)
- Dolichogenidea fumea Liu & Chen, 2018
- Dolichogenidea funalicauda Liu & Chen, 2018
- Dolichogenidea furtim (Papp, 1977)
- Dolichogenidea fuscivora Walker, 1994
- Dolichogenidea gagates (Nees, 1834)
- Dolichogenidea gallicola (Giraud, 1869)
- Dolichogenidea gansuensis Liu & Chen, 2018
- Dolichogenidea garytaylori Fagan-Jeffries & Austin, 2019
- Dolichogenidea gelechiidivoris (Marsh, 1975), a biological control used for Tuta absoluta on tomatoes.
- Dolichogenidea gentilis (Nixon, 1967)
- Dolichogenidea genuarnunezi Fernandez-Triana & Boudreault, 2019
- Dolichogenidea glabra (Papp, 1978)
- Dolichogenidea gleditsia Liu & Chen, 2019
- Dolichogenidea gobica (Papp, 1976)
- Dolichogenidea gobustanica (Kotenko, 1986)
- Dolichogenidea golovushkini (Kotenko, 1992)
- Dolichogenidea gracilariae (Wilkinson, 1940)
- Dolichogenidea gracilituba Song & Chen, 2004
- Dolichogenidea grata (Kotenko, 1986)
- Dolichogenidea halidayi (Marshall, 1872)
- Dolichogenidea hamakii (Watanabe, 1932)
- Dolichogenidea hanoii (Tobias & Long, 1990)
- Dolichogenidea hasorae Wilkinson, 1928
- Dolichogenidea hedyleptae (Muesebeck, 1958)
- Dolichogenidea helleni (Nixon, 1972)
- Dolichogenidea hemerobiellicida (Fischer, 1966)
- Dolichogenidea hemituba Liu & Chen, 2019
- Dolichogenidea heterusiae (Wilkinson, 1928)
- Dolichogenidea hexagona Liu & Chen, 2019
- Dolichogenidea hilaris (Haliday, 1834)
- Dolichogenidea homoeosomae (Muesebeck, 1933)
- Dolichogenidea hyalinis (Hedqvist, 1965)
- Dolichogenidea hyblaeae (Wilkinson, 1928)
- Dolichogenidea ilione (Nixon, 1967)
- Dolichogenidea immissa (Papp, 1977)
- Dolichogenidea imperator (Wilkinson, 1939)
- Dolichogenidea impura (Nees, 1834)
- Dolichogenidea incompleta (Szépligeti, 1914)
- Dolichogenidea incystatae Fernandez-Triana, 2019
- Dolichogenidea indicaphagous Liu & Chen, 2018
- Dolichogenidea infima (Haliday, 1834)
- Dolichogenidea infirmus Liu & Chen, 2019
- Dolichogenidea inquisitor (Wilkinson, 1928)
- Dolichogenidea interpolata (Papp, 1975)
- Dolichogenidea iranica (Telenga, 1955)
- Dolichogenidea iriarte (Nixon, 1965)
- Dolichogenidea iulis (Nixon, 1967)
- Dolichogenidea jaroshevskyi (Tobias, 1976)
- Dolichogenidea jilinensis Chen & Song, 2004
- Dolichogenidea josealfredohernandezi Fernandez-Triana & Boudreault, 2019
- Dolichogenidea kelleri Fagan-Jeffries & Austin, 2019
- Dolichogenidea kunhi Gupta & Kalesh, 2012
- Dolichogenidea kurosawai (Watanabe, 1940)
- Dolichogenidea labaris (Nixon, 1967)
- Dolichogenidea lacteicolor (Viereck, 1911)
- Dolichogenidea lacteipennis (Curtis, 1830)
- Dolichogenidea laevigata (Ratzeburg, 1848)
- Dolichogenidea laevigatoides (Nixon, 1972)
- Dolichogenidea laevissima (Ratzeburg, 1848)
- Dolichogenidea lakhaensis (Ray & Yousuf, 2009)
- Dolichogenidea lampe (Nixon, 1965)
- Dolichogenidea laspeyresiae (Viereck, 1913)
- Dolichogenidea laspeyresiella (Papp, 1972)
- Dolichogenidea laticauda Chen & Song, 2004
- Dolichogenidea latistigma (Papp, 1977)
- Dolichogenidea latitergita Liu & Chen, 2019
- Dolichogenidea lebene (Nixon, 1967)
- Dolichogenidea lemariei (Nixon, 1961)
- Dolichogenidea levifida (Kotenko, 1992)
- Dolichogenidea lincostulata Liu & Chen, 2019
- Dolichogenidea lineipes (Wesmael, 1837)
- Dolichogenidea lipsis (Nixon, 1967)
- Dolichogenidea lissos (Nixon, 1967)
- Dolichogenidea lobesiae Fagan-Jeffries & Austin, 2019
- Dolichogenidea locastrae (You & Tong, 1987)
- Dolichogenidea longialba Liu & Chen, 2019
- Dolichogenidea longicalcar (Thomson, 1895)
- Dolichogenidea longicauda (Wesmael, 1837)
- Dolichogenidea longimagna Liu & Chen, 2019
- Dolichogenidea longipalpis (Reinhard, 1880)
- Dolichogenidea longituba Song & Chen, 2004
- Dolichogenidea longivena Liu & Chen, 2018
- Dolichogenidea lucidinervis (Wilkinson, 1928)
- Dolichogenidea luctifica (Papp, 1971)
- Dolichogenidea lumba Rousse & Gupta, 2013
- Dolichogenidea lunata Liu & Chen, 2019
- Dolichogenidea maetoi Fernández-Triana & Shimizu, 2018
- Dolichogenidea malacosomae (Pandey, Ahmad, Haider & Shujauddin, 2004)
- Dolichogenidea marica (Nixon, 1972)
- Dolichogenidea maro (Nixon, 1967)
- Dolichogenidea marokkana (Fahringer, 1936)
- Dolichogenidea masoni Pandey, Ahmad, Haider & Shujauddin, 2005
- Dolichogenidea medicava Liu & Chen, 2019
- Dolichogenidea mediocaudata Fagan-Jeffries & Austin, 2018
- Dolichogenidea melaniamunozae Fernandez-Triana & Boudreault, 2019
- Dolichogenidea melanopus (Viereck, 1917)
- Dolichogenidea mendosae (Wilkinson, 1929)
- Dolichogenidea mesocanalis Liu & Chen, 2018
- Dolichogenidea metesae (Nixon, 1967)
- Dolichogenidea miantonomoi (Viereck, 1917)
- Dolichogenidea midas (Nixon, 1972)
- Dolichogenidea mimi (Papp, 1974)
- Dolichogenidea minuscula Liu & Chen, 2019
- Dolichogenidea mira (Papp, 1977)
- Dolichogenidea miris (Nixon, 1967)
- Dolichogenidea molestae (Muesebeck, 1933)
- Dolichogenidea monticola (Ashmead, 1890)
- Dolichogenidea multicolor Liu & Chen, 2019
- Dolichogenidea murinanae (Capek & Zwölfer, 1957)
- Dolichogenidea mycale (Nixon, 1972)
- Dolichogenidea myron (Nixon, 1973)
- Dolichogenidea nigra (Muesebeck, 1921)
- Dolichogenidea nixosiris (Papp, 1976)
- Dolichogenidea novoguineensis (Szépligeti, 1905)
- Dolichogenidea numenes (Nixon, 1967)
- Dolichogenidea oblicarina Chen & Song, 2004
- Dolichogenidea obscurugosa Liu & Chen, 2018
- Dolichogenidea obsoleta Liu & Chen, 2019
- Dolichogenidea obstans (Papp, 1971)
- Dolichogenidea oehlkei (Papp, 1982)
- Dolichogenidea oidaematophori (Muesebeck, 1929)
- Dolichogenidea olivierellae (Wilkinson, 1936)
- Dolichogenidea ononidis (Marshall, 1889)
- Dolichogenidea opacifinis Liu & Chen, 2019
- Dolichogenidea ovata Liu & Chen, 2019
- Dolichogenidea pallidalata (Tobias, 1964)
- Dolichogenidea palpator (Tobias, 1960)
- Dolichogenidea paracostulae Liu & Chen, 2018
- Dolichogenidea paralechiae (Muesebeck, 1932)
- Dolichogenidea parallelis (Ashmead, 1900)
- Dolichogenidea parallodorsum Liu & Chen, 2019
- Dolichogenidea parametacarp Liu & Chen, 2018
- Dolichogenidea paranthrenea (You & Dang, 1987)
- Dolichogenidea parasae (Rohwer, 1922)
- Dolichogenidea partergita Liu & Chen, 2018
- Dolichogenidea pelopea (Nixon, 1973)
- Dolichogenidea pelops (de Saeger, 1944)
- Dolichogenidea pentgona Liu & Chen, 2019
- Dolichogenidea petrovae (Walley, 1937)
- Dolichogenidea phaenna (Nixon, 1965)
- Dolichogenidea phaloniae (Wilkinson, 1940)
- Dolichogenidea phaola (Nixon, 1972)
- Dolichogenidea phthorimaeae (Muesebeck, 1921)
- Dolichogenidea piliventris (Tobias, 1966)
- Dolichogenidea pisenor (Nixon, 1965)
- Dolichogenidea platyedrae (Wilkinson, 1928)
- Dolichogenidea polaszeki Walker, 1994
- Dolichogenidea poliobrevis Liu & Chen, 2018
- Dolichogenidea politiventris (Muesebeck, 1958)
- Dolichogenidea polystinelliphagous Liu & Chen, 2018
- Dolichogenidea praetor (Marshall, 1885)
- Dolichogenidea praetoria (Tobias, 1976)
- Dolichogenidea princeps (Wilkinson, 1941)
- Dolichogenidea prisca (Nixon, 1967)
- Dolichogenidea probata (Papp, 1973)
- Dolichogenidea prodeniae (Viereck, 1912)
- Dolichogenidea propinqua (Papp, 1975)
- Dolichogenidea pterophori (Muesebeck, 1926)
- Dolichogenidea pulchra (Telenga, 1955)
- Dolichogenidea punctiger (Wesmael, 1837)
- Dolichogenidea punctipila Liu & Chen, 2019
- Dolichogenidea purdus (Papp, 1977)
- Dolichogenidea rectivena Liu & Chen, 2019
- Dolichogenidea reicharti (Papp, 1974)
- Dolichogenidea renata (Kotenko, 1986)
- Dolichogenidea renaulti (Mason, 1974)
- Dolichogenidea roepkei (Shenefelt, 1972)
- Dolichogenidea rogerblancoi Fernandez-Triana & Boudreault, 2019
- Dolichogenidea rufescentis Chen & Song, 2004
- Dolichogenidea sagus (Kotenko, 1986)
- Dolichogenidea sandwico Liu & Chen, 2018
- Dolichogenidea scabipuncta Chen & Song, 2004
- Dolichogenidea scabra (Tobias, 1977)
- Dolichogenidea seriphia (Nixon, 1972)
- Dolichogenidea sicaria (Marshall, 1885)
- Dolichogenidea simulata (Papp, 1974)
- Dolichogenidea singularis Yang & You, 2002
- Dolichogenidea sisenna (Nixon, 1972)
- Dolichogenidea soikai (Nixon, 1972)
- Dolichogenidea solenobiae (Walley, 1935)
- Dolichogenidea sonani (Watanabe, 1932)
- Dolichogenidea sophiae (Papp, 1972)
- Dolichogenidea spanis Chen & Song, 2004
- Dolichogenidea spinulicula Liu & Chen, 2018
- Dolichogenidea stantoni (Ashmead, 1904)
- Dolichogenidea statius (Nixon, 1965)
- Dolichogenidea stenosis Song & Chen, 2004
- Dolichogenidea stenotelas (Nixon, 1965)
- Dolichogenidea stictoscutella Liu & Chen, 2018
- Dolichogenidea striata (van Achterberg & Ng, 2009)
- Dolichogenidea subemarginata (Abdinbekova, 1969)
- Dolichogenidea subgentilis (Tobias & Long, 1990)
- Dolichogenidea sublabene (Tobias & Long, 1990)
- Dolichogenidea sugae (Watanabe, 1932)
- Dolichogenidea syngramma Ahmad & Pandey, 2019
- Dolichogenidea szalayi (Papp, 1977)
- Dolichogenidea szelenyii (Papp, 1972)
- Dolichogenidea taiwanensis (Sonan, 1942)
- Dolichogenidea tasmanica (Cameron, 1912)
- Dolichogenidea testacea Liu & Chen, 2018
- Dolichogenidea thujae (Muesebeck, 1935)
- Dolichogenidea tischeriae Viereck (1912)
- Dolichogenidea tobiasi (Balevski, 1980)
- Dolichogenidea trachalus (Nixon, 1965)
- Dolichogenidea transcarinata Liu & Chen, 2019
- Dolichogenidea tuliemensis (Tobias & Long, 1990)
- Dolichogenidea turcmenica (Tobias, 1967)
- Dolichogenidea turionellae (Nixon, 1971)
- Dolichogenidea turkmenus (Telenga, 1955)
- Dolichogenidea ultima (Kotenko, 1986)
- Dolichogenidea ultor (Reinhard, 1880)
- Dolichogenidea unicarina Liu & Chen, 2018
- Dolichogenidea upoluensis (Fullaway, 1941)
- Dolichogenidea uru Rousse & Gupta, 2013
- Dolichogenidea vadosulcus Liu & Chen, 2019
- Dolichogenidea varifemur (Abdinbekova, 1969)
- Dolichogenidea vernaliter (Wilkinson, 1932)
- Dolichogenidea victor (Wilkinson, 1941)
- Dolichogenidea victoria Liu & Chen, 2019
- Dolichogenidea victoriae (Muesebeck, 1921)
- Dolichogenidea victoriata (Kotenko, 1986)
- Dolichogenidea villemantae Rousse, 2013
- Dolichogenidea wangi Liu & Chen, 2019
- Dolichogenidea wittei (de Saeger, 1944)
- Dolichogenidea xenomorph Fagan-Jeffries & Austin, 2018
- Dolichogenidea yamini Sathe & Rokade, 2005
- Dolichogenidea yeimycedenoae Fernandez-Triana & Boudreault, 2019
- Dolichogenidea zerafai Papp, 2015
- Dolichogenidea zeris Papp, 2012
