= Calicotis antinoma =

Scientific classification
- Kingdom: Animalia
- Phylum: Arthropoda
- Class: Insecta
- Order: Lepidoptera
- Family: Stathmopodidae
- Genus: Calicotis
- Species: C. antinoma

Binomial name
- Calicotis antinoma Meyrick, 1910

Synonyms
- Pachyrhabda antinoma Meyrick, 1910; Stathmopoda cryerodes Turner, 1915

Species of moth

Calicotis antinoma is a moth of the family Oecophoridae first described by Edward Meyrick in 1910. It is found in New Zealand at the Kermadec Islands and has also been collected in Australia.

== Taxonomy ==
Originally identified as Pachyrhabda antinoma by Edward Meyrick in 1910, the species was described a second time by Turner in 1915, who named it Stathmopoda cryerodes. In 2024, the genus Pachyrhabda was synonymised with Calicotis.
