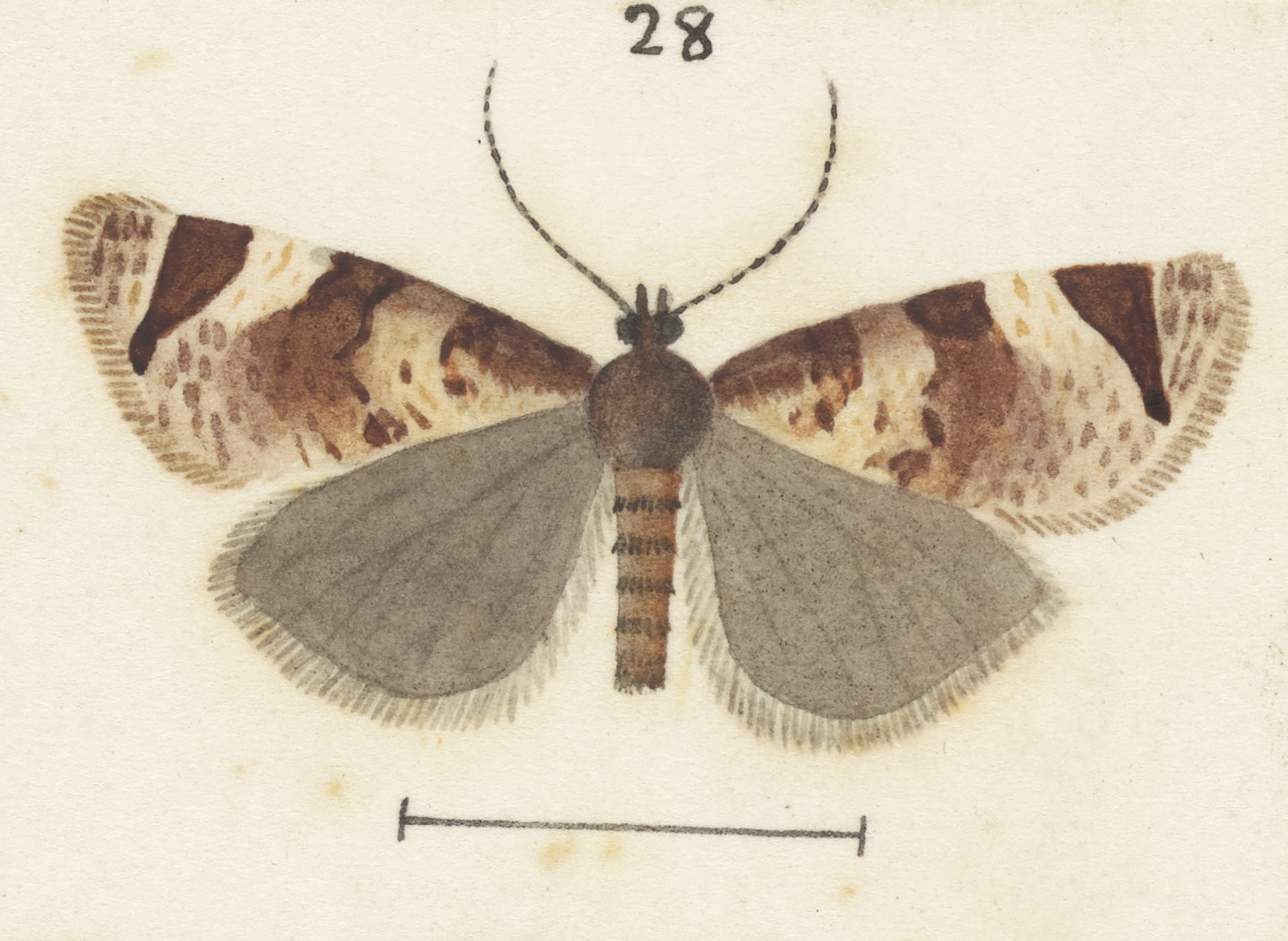
- Illustration of male

Scientific classification
- Kingdom: Animalia
- Phylum: Arthropoda
- Class: Insecta
- Order: Lepidoptera
- Family: Tortricidae
- Genus: Tortrix
- Species: T. sphenias

Binomial name
- Tortrix sphenias (Meyrick, 1909)

= Tortrix sphenias =

Species of moth, endemic to New Zealand

Tortrix sphenias is a species of moth of the family Tortricidae. It is endemic to New Zealand. It is likely that this species probably belongs to another genus and as such this species is also known as Tortrix (s.l.) zestodes.
