= Calicotis tumida =

Scientific classification
- Domain: Eukaryota
- Kingdom: Animalia
- Phylum: Arthropoda
- Class: Insecta
- Order: Lepidoptera
- Family: Stathmopodidae
- Genus: Pachyrhabda
- Species: P. tumida

Binomial name
- Pachyrhabda tumida Meyrick, 1913

Species of moth

Pachyrhabda tumida is a moth of the family Stathmopodidae first described by Edward Meyrick in 1913. It is found in Sri Lanka and Australia.
