= Calicotis steropodes =

Scientific classification
- Kingdom: Animalia
- Phylum: Arthropoda
- Clade: Pancrustacea
- Class: Insecta
- Order: Lepidoptera
- Family: Stathmopodidae
- Genus: Calicotis
- Species: C. steropodes

Binomial name
- Calicotis steropodes Meyrick, 1897

Synonyms
- Pachyrhabda steropodes Meyrick 1887

Species of moth

Calicotis steropodes is a moth of the family Stathmopodidae, described by Edward Meyrick in 1897 from a specimen found in Australia. It is endemic to Australia and in 2010 was found at Abbotsbury, Dorset, England. In England, the moth flies in the summer and the larvae feed on ferns, particularly soft shield fern (Polystichum setiferum).

== Distribution ==
In Australia the moth is found in New South Wales, Queensland, Tasmania and Victoria, while in Europe it has been found in Dorset and Devon in England and south-west Wales.
