= Calicotis dicastis =

Scientific classification
- Domain: Eukaryota
- Kingdom: Animalia
- Phylum: Arthropoda
- Class: Insecta
- Order: Lepidoptera
- Family: Stathmopodidae
- Genus: Pachyrhabda
- Species: P. dicastis

Binomial name
- Pachyrhabda dicastis (Meyrick, 1905)

Synonyms
- Cuphodes dicastis Meyrick, 1905

Species of moth

Pachyrhabda dicastis is a moth of the family Stathmopodidae first described by Edward Meyrick in 1905. It is found in Sri Lanka.
