= Calicotis bacterias =

Scientific classification
- Kingdom: Animalia
- Phylum: Arthropoda
- Class: Insecta
- Order: Lepidoptera
- Family: Stathmopodidae
- Genus: Pachyrhabda
- Species: P. bacterias

Binomial name
- Pachyrhabda bacterias Meyrick, 1913

Species of moth

Pachyrhabda bacterias is a moth of the family Stathmopodidae first described by Edward Meyrick in 1913. It is found in Sri Lanka and Australia.
