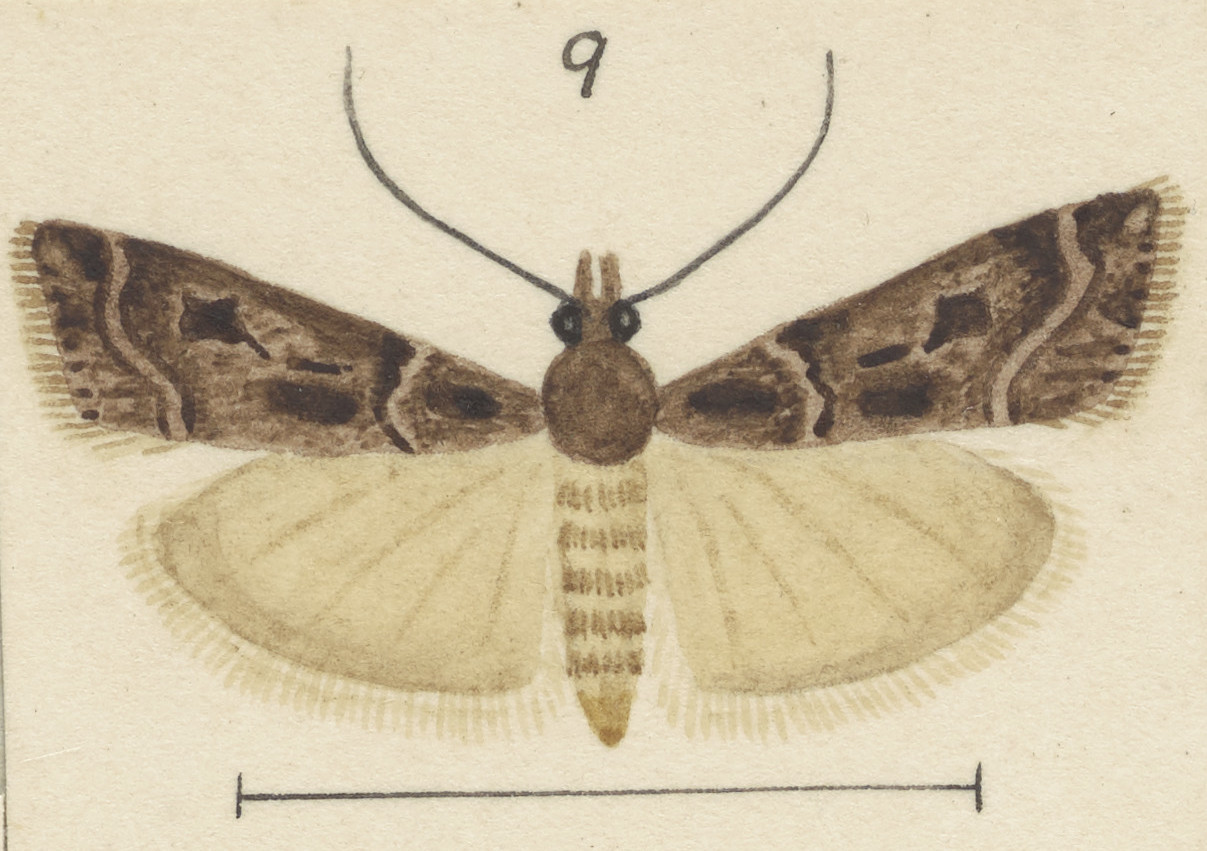

Scientific classification
- Kingdom: Animalia
- Phylum: Arthropoda
- Class: Insecta
- Order: Lepidoptera
- Family: Crambidae
- Genus: Eudonia
- Species: E. pachyerga

Binomial name
- Eudonia pachyerga (Meyrick, 1927)

Synonyms
- Scoparia pachyerga Meyrick, 1927

= Eudonia pachyerga =

Species of moth

Eudonia pachyerga is a moth in the family Crambidae. It was described by Edward Meyrick in 1927. It is endemic to New Zealand.

The wingspan is about 24 mm. The forewings are brown, mixed with blackish-fuscous. The first and second lines are whitish, edged with a blackish shade posteriorly. The hindwings are pale brassy-greyish. Adults have been recorded on wing in January.
