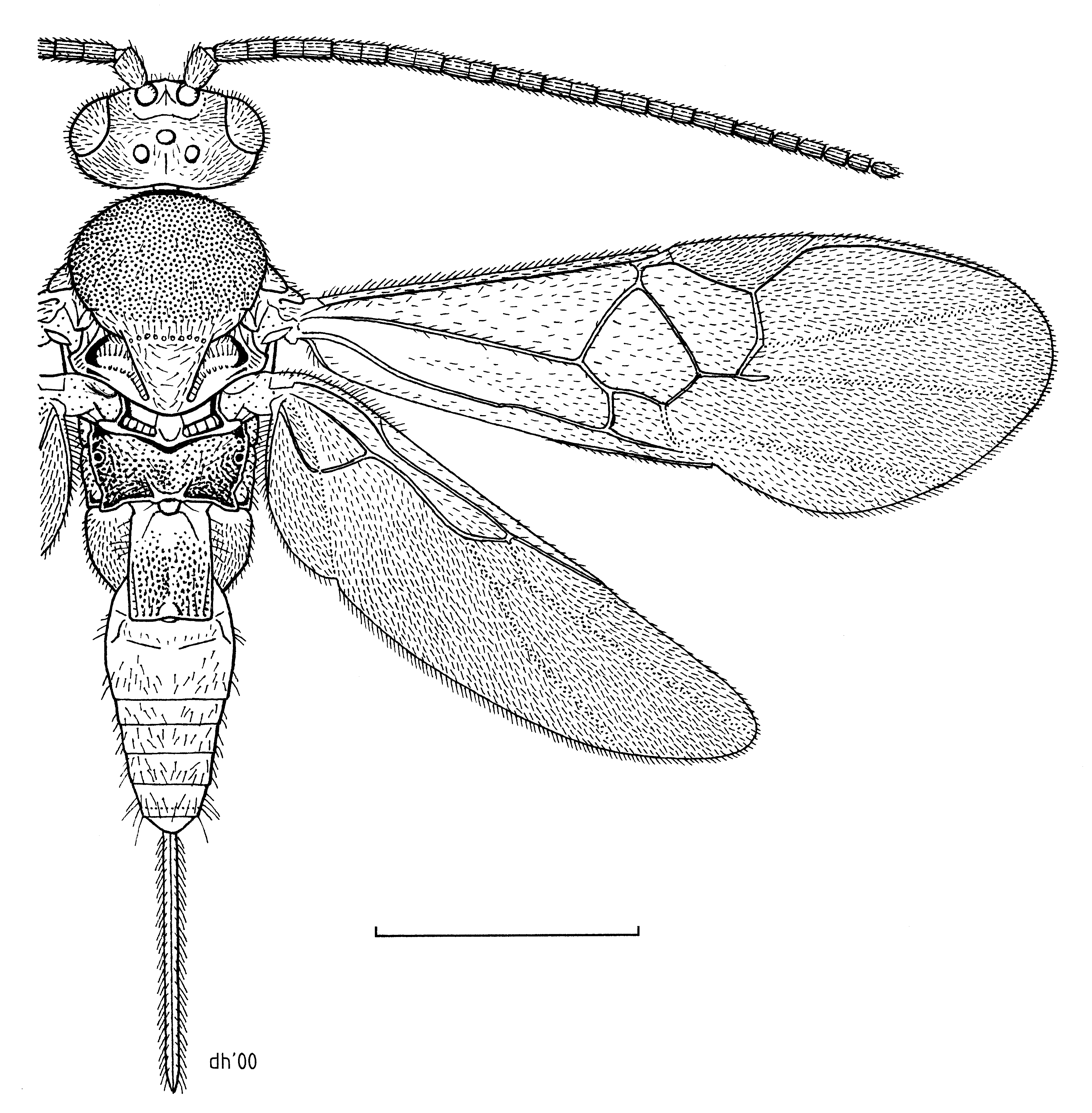
- Dolichogenidea tasmanica

Scientific classification
- Kingdom: Animalia
- Phylum: Arthropoda
- Class: Insecta
- Order: Hymenoptera
- Family: Braconidae
- Subfamily: Microgastrinae
- Genus: Dolichogenidea; Viereck, 1911

Diversity
- at least 360 species

= Dolichogenidea =

Genus of wasps

Dolichogenidea is a genus of parasitoid wasps in the family Braconidae. There are more than 360 described species in Dolichogenidea, found throughout the world.

== See also ==
- List of Dolichogenidea species
