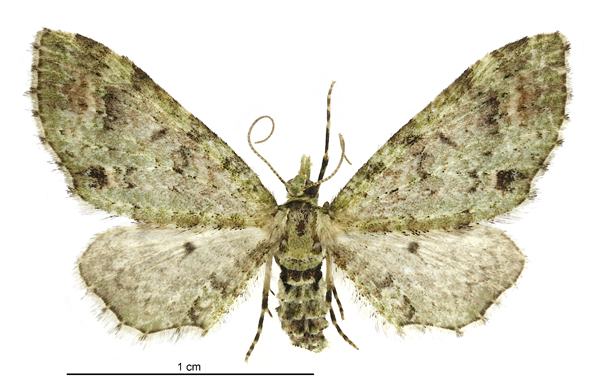
- Female
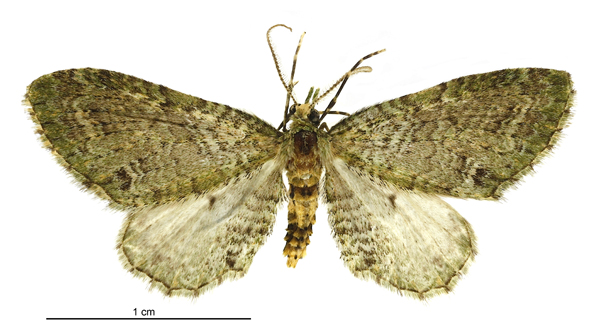
- Male

Scientific classification
- Kingdom: Animalia
- Phylum: Arthropoda
- Class: Insecta
- Order: Lepidoptera
- Family: Geometridae
- Genus: Pasiphila
- Species: P. cotinaea

Binomial name
- Pasiphila cotinaea (Meyrick, 1913)

Synonyms
- Chloroclystis cotinaea Meyrick, 1913; Chloroclystis tornospila Meyrick, 1931

= Pasiphila cotinaea =

Species of moth

Pasiphila cotinaea is a species of moth in the family Geometridae. It is endemic to New Zealand. Its larvae feed off Olearia species and the adult moth can be seen on the wing from November to April. This species is regarded as rare.

== Taxonomy ==
This species was first described in 1913 by Edward Meyrick and named Chloroclystis cotinaea. Meyrick collected the type specimen in March 1883 in Masterton. This specimen is held at the Natural History Museum, London. George Hudson discussed this species in 1928 in his book The Butterflies and Moths of New Zealand stating that no other examples of this moth had yet been found. In 1931 Meyrick, thinking he was describing a new species, again described and naming it Chloroclystis tornospila. Meyrick used a specimen collected by George Hudson in the Tongariro National Park which is also held at the Natural History Museum, London. In 1939 Hudson illustrated this moth in A Supplement to the Butterflies and Moths of New Zealand. Hudson also illustrated what he believed to be the female of the species in 1950. In 1971 John S. Dugdale placed C. cotinaea within the genus Pasiphila. C. tornospila was synonymised with P. cotinaea in 1988 by Dugdale.

== Description ==
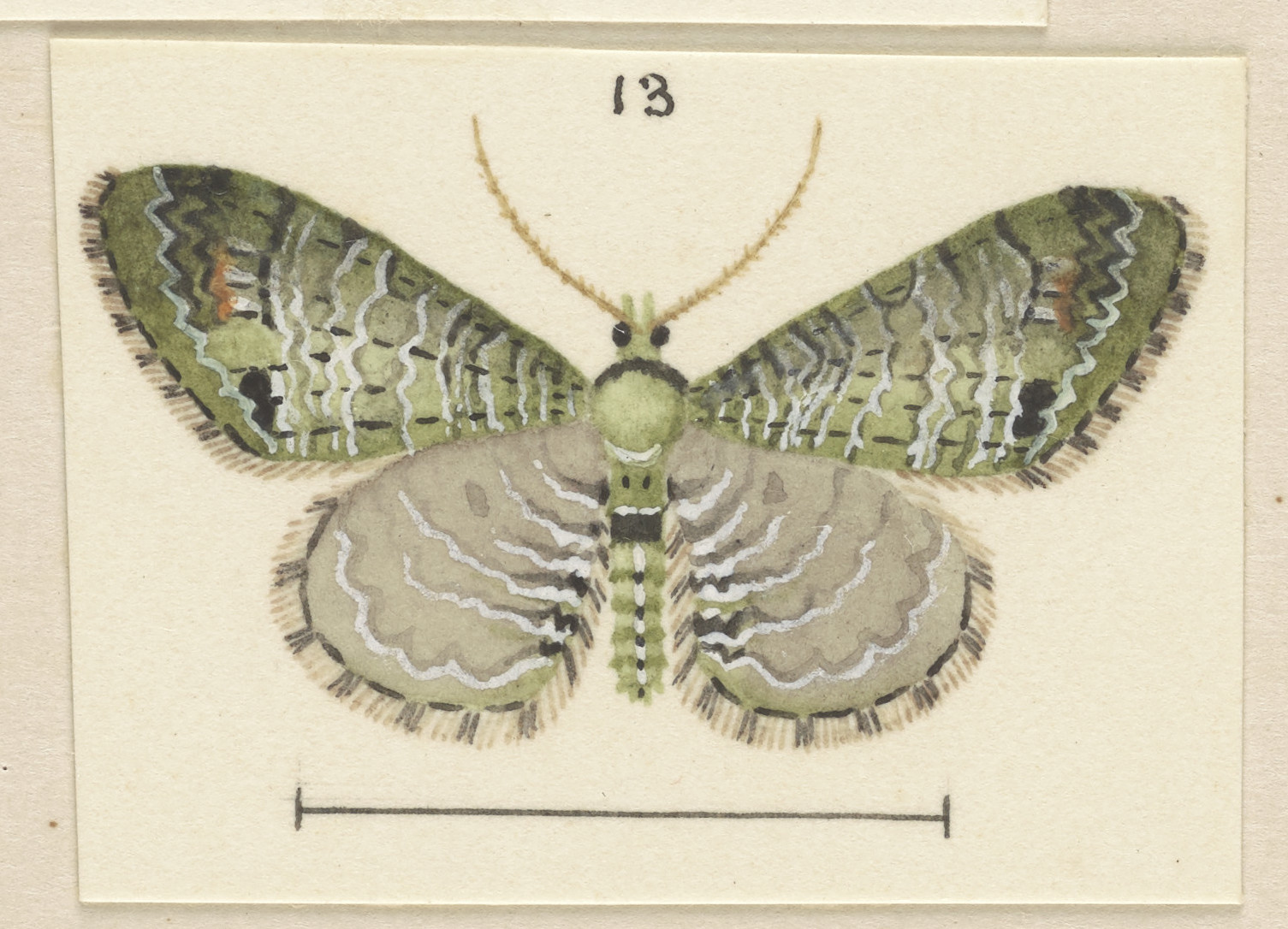
Pasiphila cotinaea by George Hudson

Meyrick described this species as follows:

♂. 23 mm. Palpi 2 1/2. Antennal ciliations 3 1/2. Abdomen with dark-fuscous subbasal band. Forewings triangular, termen bowed, oblique, sinuate just above tornus; light pinkish-fuscous, striated with fuscous, towards costa and termen suffused with pale dull green, veins pale-greenish marked with dark fuscous; median band hardly defined; a narrow dark-fuscous spot preceding subterminal stria above tornus: cilia fuscous, base spotted with dark fuscous. Hindwings moderate, termen rather unevenly rounded, sinuate above tornus; light grey, towards dorsum tinged with pale-greenish and striated with dark-fuscous irroration; a dark-grey roundish discal dot: cilia whitish-grey.

The larvae of this species are green, red and white lined.

== Distribution ==
P. cotinaea is endemic to New Zealand. It is known from the middle of the North Island down as far south as Southland and is abundant in the eastern part of the South Island. However they have not been found in eastern Otago. This species is regarded as being rare.

== Life cycle and behaviour ==
Adults are on wing from November to April and are most common in April. There may be two generations per year. Hudson mentions that he collected a specimen that was attracted to light.

== Host species and habitat ==
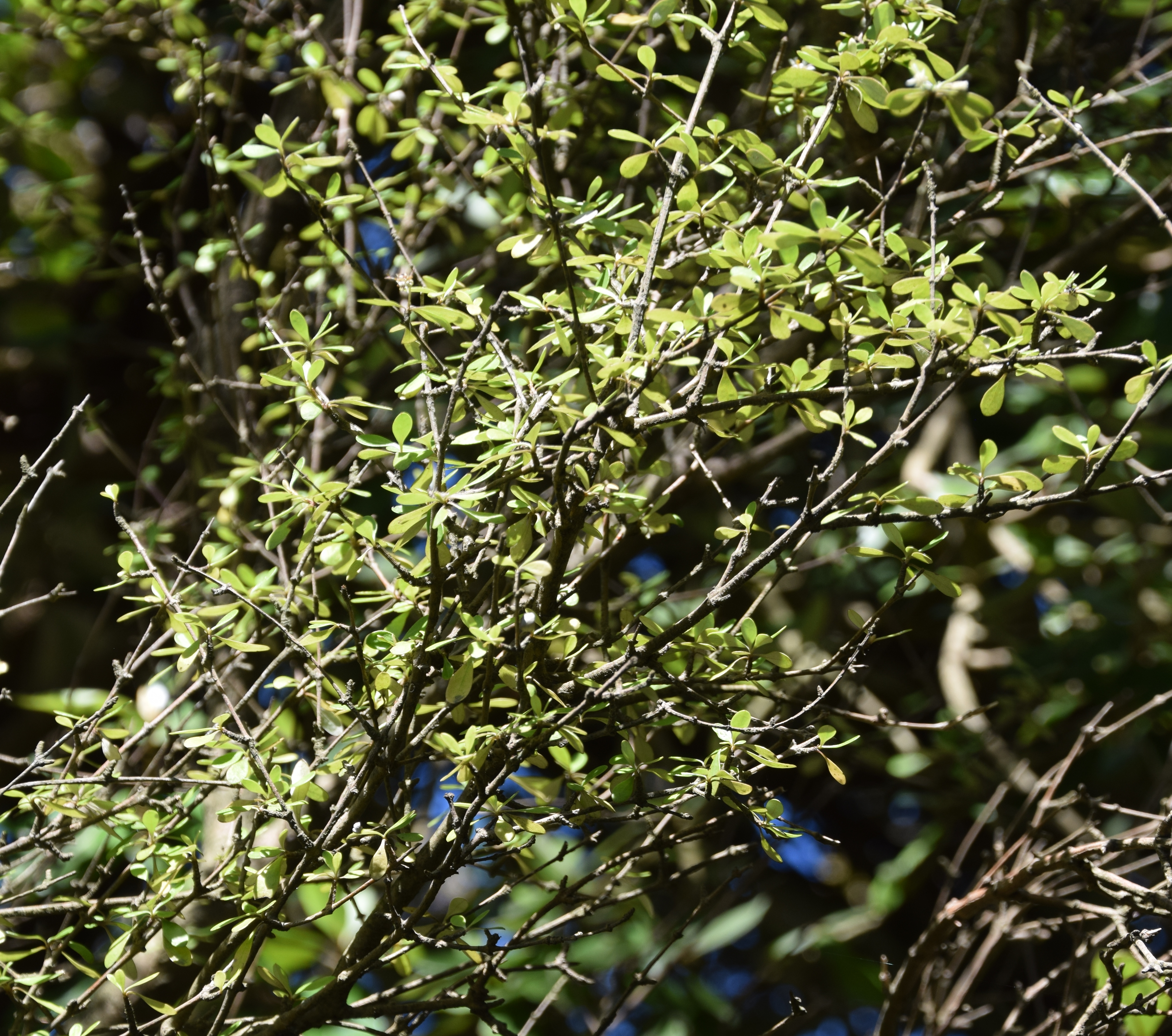
Olearia odorata

The preferred habitat of this lowland species are forested valleys and associated shrublands. The larvae feed on the flowers of various small-leaved Olearia species including O. odorata, O. bullata, O. laxiflora, O. fimbriata, O. hectorii and O. virgata.
