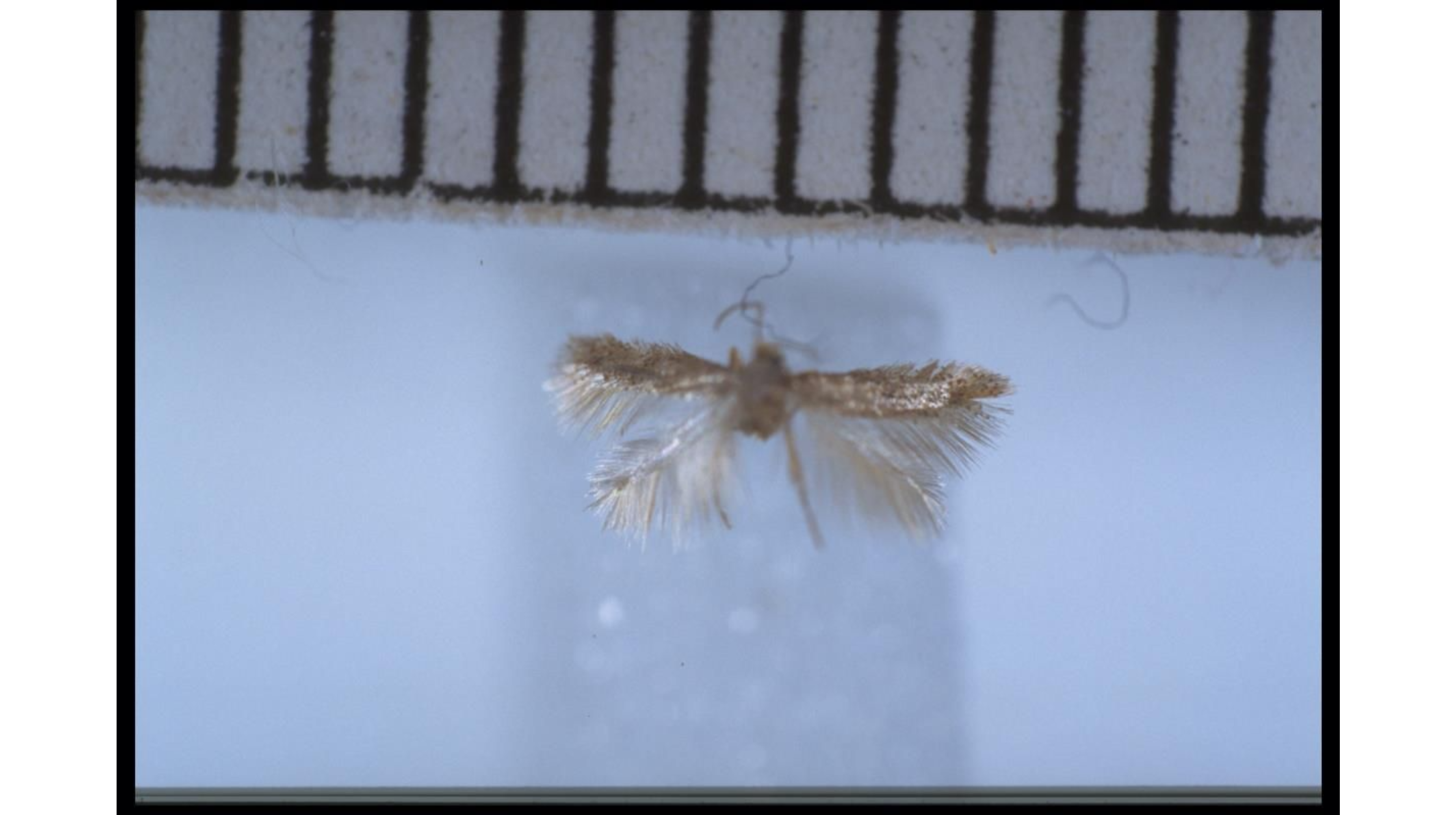
- Male holotype

Scientific classification
- Kingdom: Animalia
- Phylum: Arthropoda
- Clade: Pancrustacea
- Class: Insecta
- Order: Lepidoptera
- Family: Nepticulidae
- Genus: Stigmella
- Species: S. ilsea

Binomial name
- Stigmella ilsea Donner & Wilkinson, 1989

= Stigmella ilsea =

Species of moth endemic to New Zealand

Stigmella ilsea is a moth of the family Nepticulidae. It is endemic to New Zealand and has been observed in the North and South Islands. The larvae of this species are leaf miners and feed on Olearia virgata, Olearia rugosa, Olearia odorata, Olearia laxiflora, Olearia lineate and Olearia hectorii. Adult moths have been recorded in January, October and November. Reared specimens emerged from July to September. There is likely one generation per year.

== Taxonomy ==
This species was first described in 1989 by Hans Donner and Christopher Wilkinson from specimens collected in Taupō and Otago. The male holotype specimen, collected at Whenuakura flats at Whanganui Valley in the Taringamotu State Forest at an altitude of 792 m on the 11 October 1979 by J. S. Dugdale, is held in the New Zealand Arthropod Collection.

== Distribution ==
This species is endemic to New Zealand and has been observed in the North and South Islands.

== Hosts ==
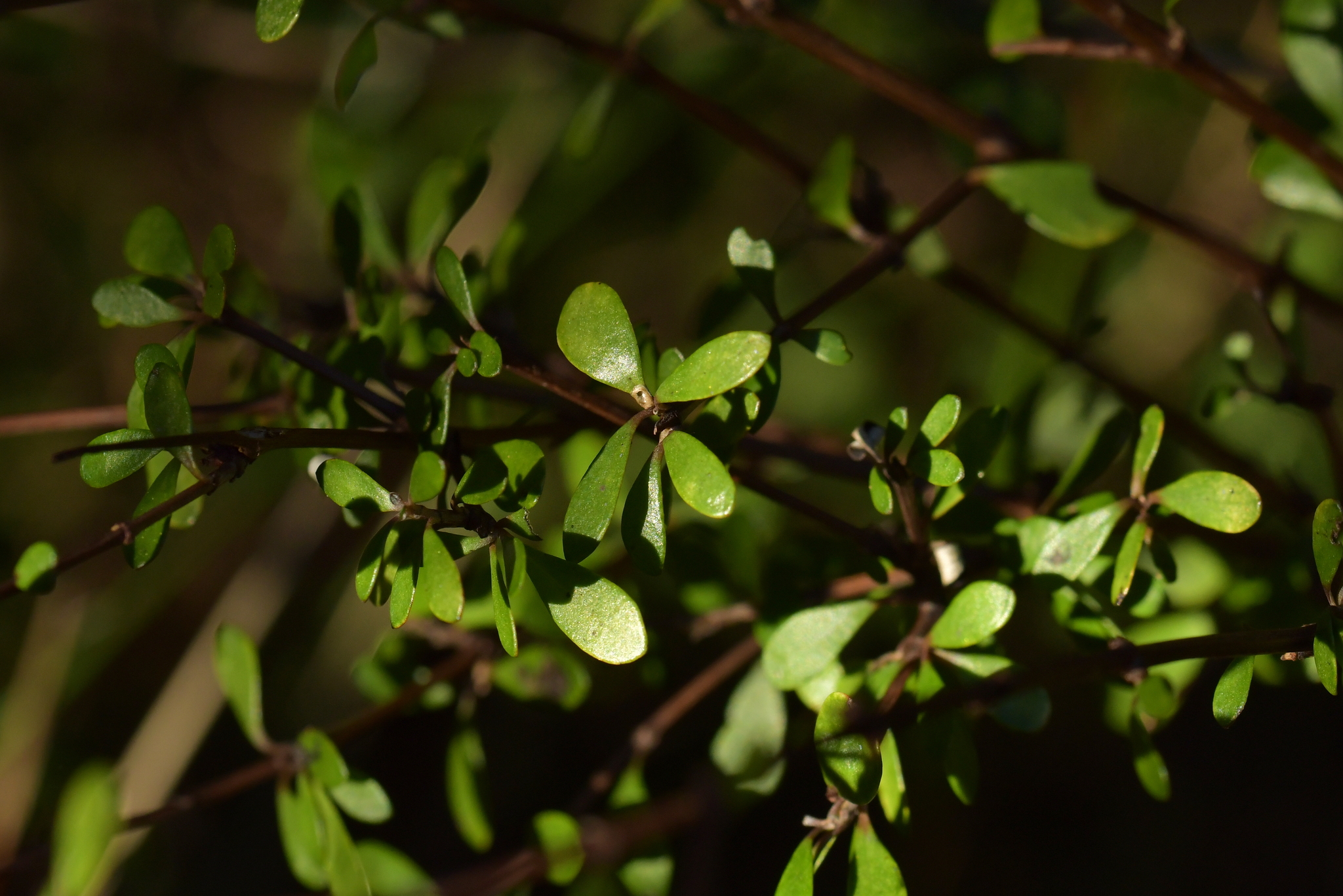
Larval host O. virgata.

The larvae feed on Olearia virgata, Olearia rugosa, Olearia odorata, Olearia laxiflora, Olearia lineate and Olearia hectorii.

== Behaviour ==
The larvae mine the leaves of their host plant. The mine starts as very narrow gallery, but a full-grown larva occupies all space between the cuticles, leaving nothing but a small, empty bladder. Larvae have been recorded from February to May and in July and September. The cocoon is pale brown and is spun in detritus on the ground underneath the host plant. Adult moths have been recorded in January, October and November. Reared specimens emerged from July to September. There is probably one generation per year.
