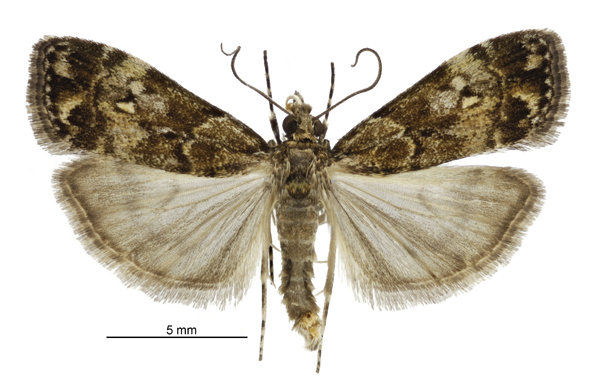
- Male
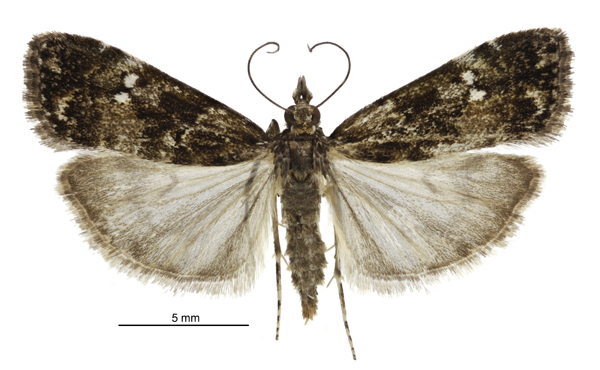
- Female

Scientific classification
- Kingdom: Animalia
- Phylum: Arthropoda
- Class: Insecta
- Order: Lepidoptera
- Family: Crambidae
- Genus: Eudonia
- Species: E. dinodes

Binomial name
- Eudonia dinodes (Meyrick, 1884)

Synonyms
- Scoparia dinodes Meyrick, 1884

= Eudonia dinodes =

Species of moth endemic to New Zealand

Eudonia dinodes is a moth in the family Crambidae. It was named by Edward Meyrick in 1884. This species is endemic to New Zealand and has been observed in the North, South, Stewart and Chatham Islands. This species inhabits native forests. The larvae feed on mosses and are active and tunnel amongst moss on tree trunks. Adults are cryptic when resting on tree trunks with wings closed.

== Taxonomy ==
This species was named by Edward Meyrick in 1884 using two specimens collected in Christchurch and Dunedin in January and was originally named Scoparia dinodes. Meyrick went on to give a full description of the species in 1885. George Hudson discussed and illustrated this species in his 1928 publication The butterflies and moths of New Zealand. In 1988 John S. Dugdale placed this species in the genus Eudonia. The holotype specimen, collected at Riccarton Bush in Christchurch, is held at the Natural History Museum, London.

== Description ==
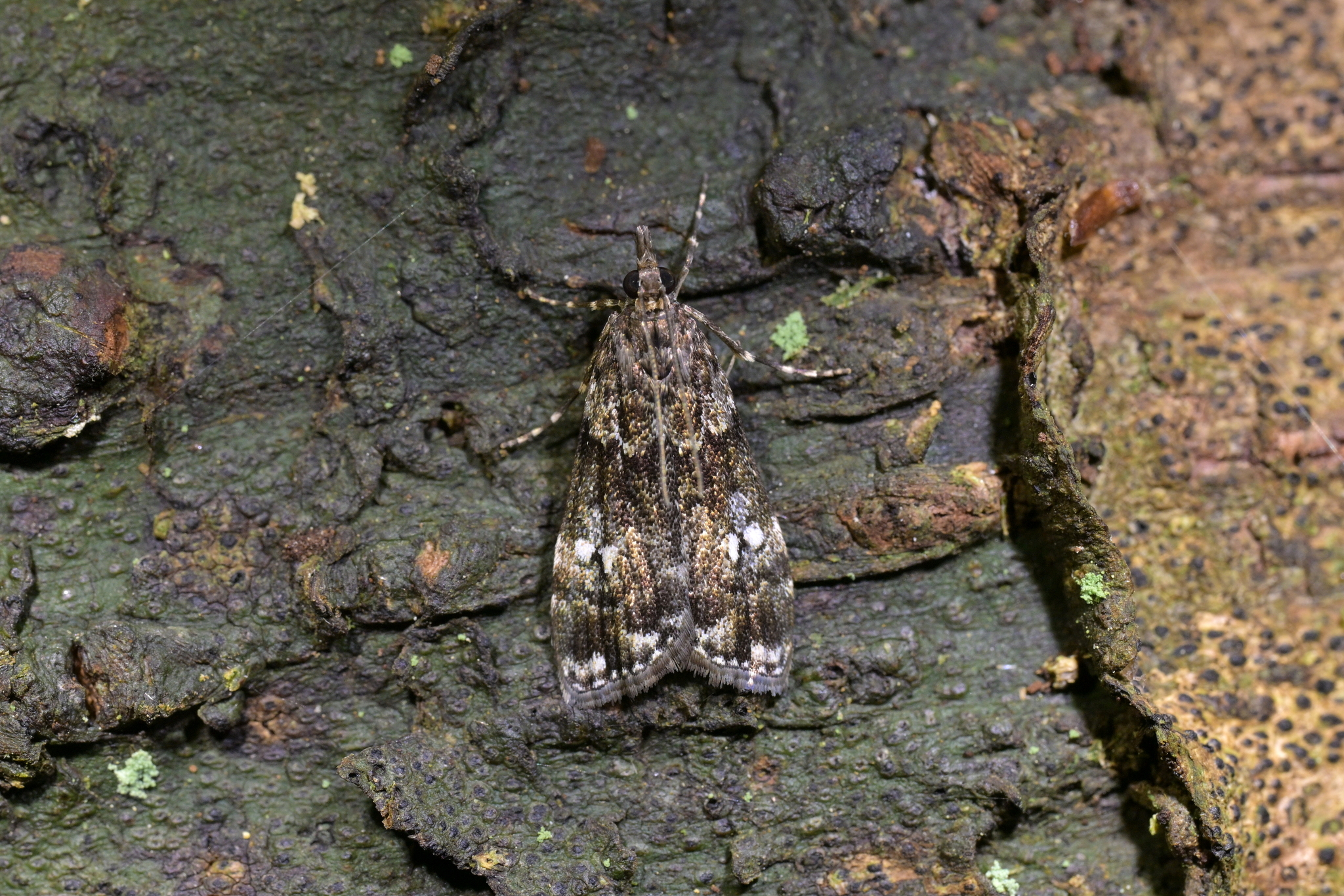

Hudson described the larva of this species as follows:

The larva, which feeds on mosses during the winter and early spring, is about 1/2 inch in length, cylindrical, slightly tapering at each end. The head and dorsal plate of the second segment are very deep bronzy-black, slightly tinged with green and very highly polished; the rest of the body is pale bronzy-brown tinged with yellowish-green; there are four rows of large highly-polished bronzy-greenish-black tubercles, the two sub-dorsal rows having one large and one small tubercle to each segment; a stout black bristle rises from each tubercle.

Meyrick described the male adult of this species as follows:

Male.—17 mm. Head and thorax rather dark fuscous, somewhat mixed with whitish. Palpi 2, dark grey, basal joint white. Antennae dark fuscous; ciliations 1/4. Abdomen whitish-grey. Legs white, tibiae and tarsi banded with black. Forewings triangular, costa gently arched, apex rounded, hindmargin nearly straight, oblique; white, densely irrorated with dark fuscous; basal area suffusedly spotted with black; first line hardly whitish, very obscure, posteriorly black-margined, curved, hardly indented; orbicular and claviform small, roundish, obscure, black, detached; a rather broad clear white transverse space before second line, of even width except on inner margin, where it is contracted; reniform included in this, 8-shaped, white, black-margined; second line slender, obscure, white, anteriorly dark-margined, somewhat curved, hardly sinuate; subterminal line narrow, white, distinct, interrupted above middle, not touching second line; a hindmarginal row of white dots: cilia grey, with a dark grey line. Hindwings 1 1/4, whitish-grey, lunule and postmedian line obscurely indicated, hindmargin darker grey; cilia whitish, with a dark grey line.

This species is similar in appearance to Eudonia minualis and Eudonia minusculalis but can be distinguished by its remarkably short antennal ciliations and lack of ochreous blotch on the forewings. Hudson pointed out that this species differs from E. minualis and the absence of the yellow blotch near the termen and the clear white 8-shaped reniform and from Eudonia minusculalis by the much smaller and more broken white markings.

== Distribution ==
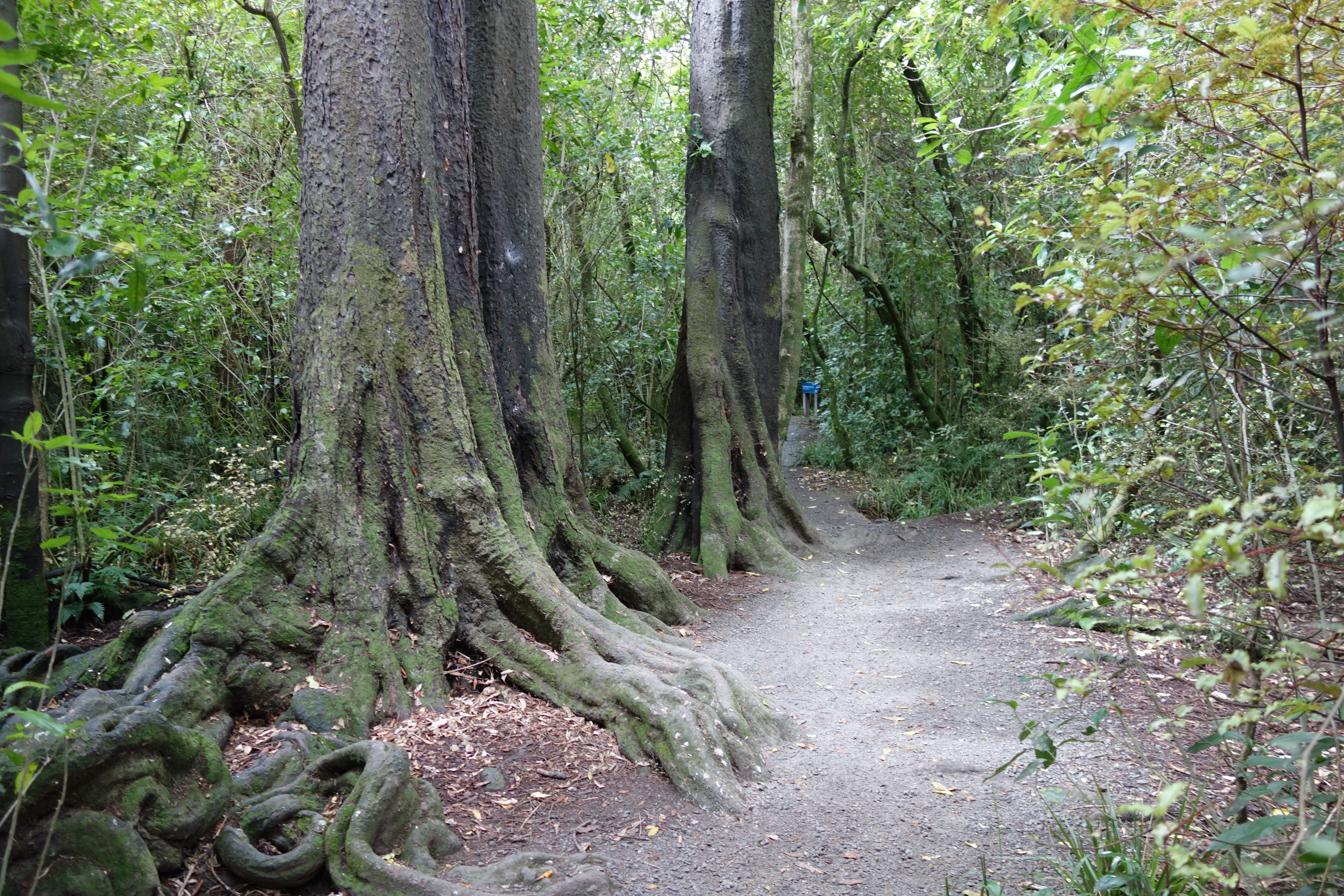
Riccarton Bush, type locality.

This species is endemic to New Zealand. It has been observed in the North, South, Stewart and Chatham Islands.

== Habitat ==
This species inhabits native forest.

== Behaviour ==
The larva is very active, tunnelling amongst moss on fallen logs. The adult of this species is most commonly on the wing in December to February. The adult moth's colouration is protective when it rests with closed wings on tree-trunks. This species has been collected by beating.
