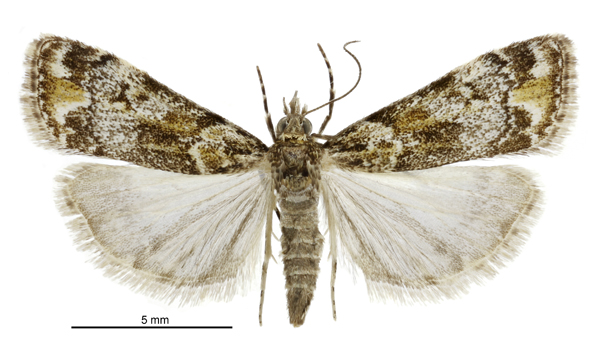
- Female
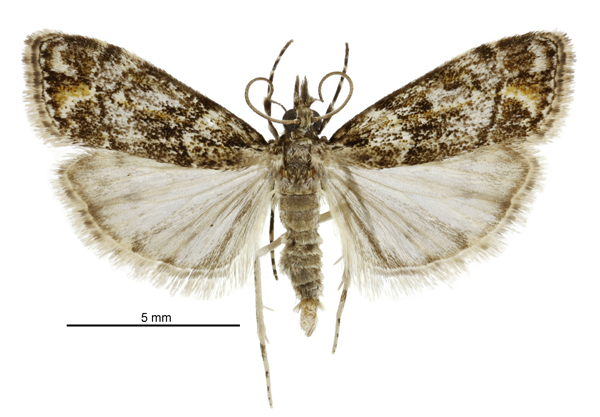
- Male

Scientific classification
- Kingdom: Animalia
- Phylum: Arthropoda
- Class: Insecta
- Order: Lepidoptera
- Family: Crambidae
- Genus: Eudonia
- Species: E. minualis

Binomial name
- Eudonia minualis (Walker, 1866)

Synonyms
- Scoparia minualis Walker, 1866; Scoparia chimeria Meyrick, 1885

= Eudonia minualis =

Species of moth

Eudonia minualis is a species of moth of the family Crambidae. It was described by Francis Walker in 1866. It is endemic to New Zealand.

The larvae feed on mosses on the bark of Olearia bullata and Olearia hectorii.
