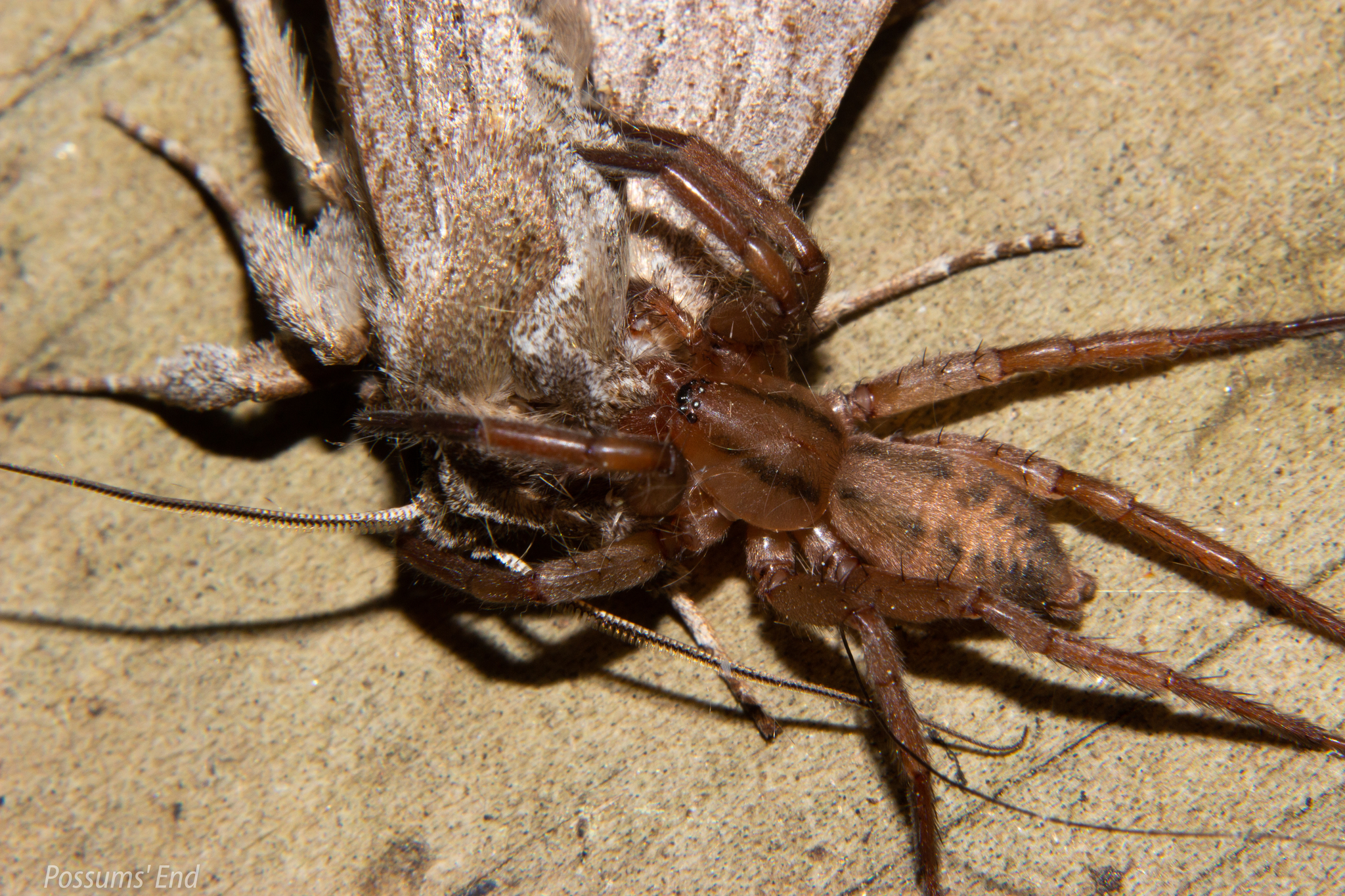
- Notiodrassus distinctus attacking an Ichneutica ustistriga

Scientific classification
- Kingdom: Animalia
- Phylum: Arthropoda
- Subphylum: Chelicerata
- Class: Arachnida
- Order: Araneae
- Infraorder: Araneomorphae
- Family: Gnaphosidae
- Genus: Notiodrassus; Bryant, 1935

Type species
- N. distinctus Bryant, 1935

Species
- N. distinctus Bryant, 1935 – New Zealand; N. fiordensis Forster, 1979 – New Zealand

= Notiodrassus =

Genus of spiders

Notiodrassus is a genus of South Pacific ground spiders that was first described by Elizabeth B. Bryant in 1935. As of May 2019 it contains only two species, both found in New Zealand: N. distinctus and N. fiordensis.
