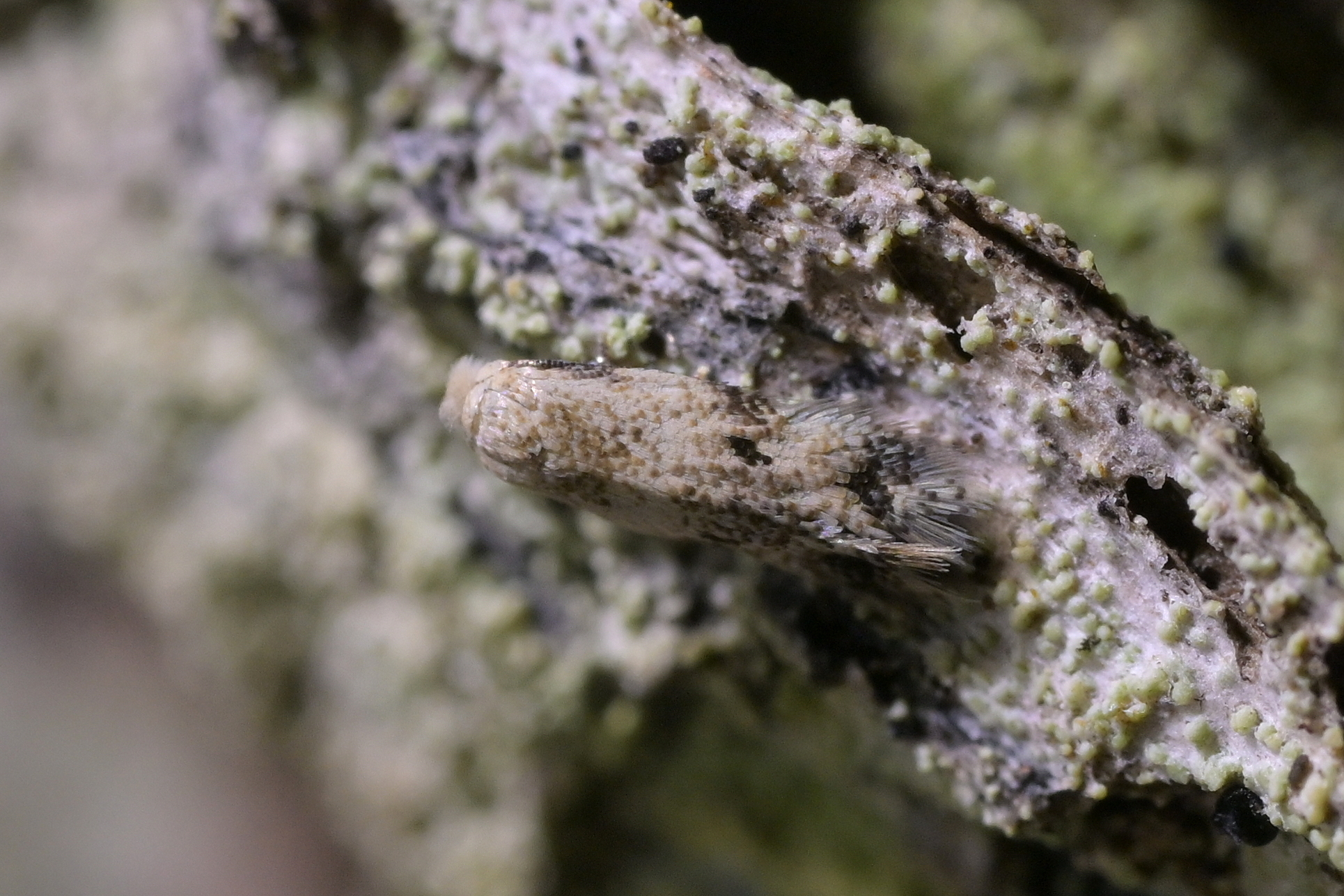
- Male
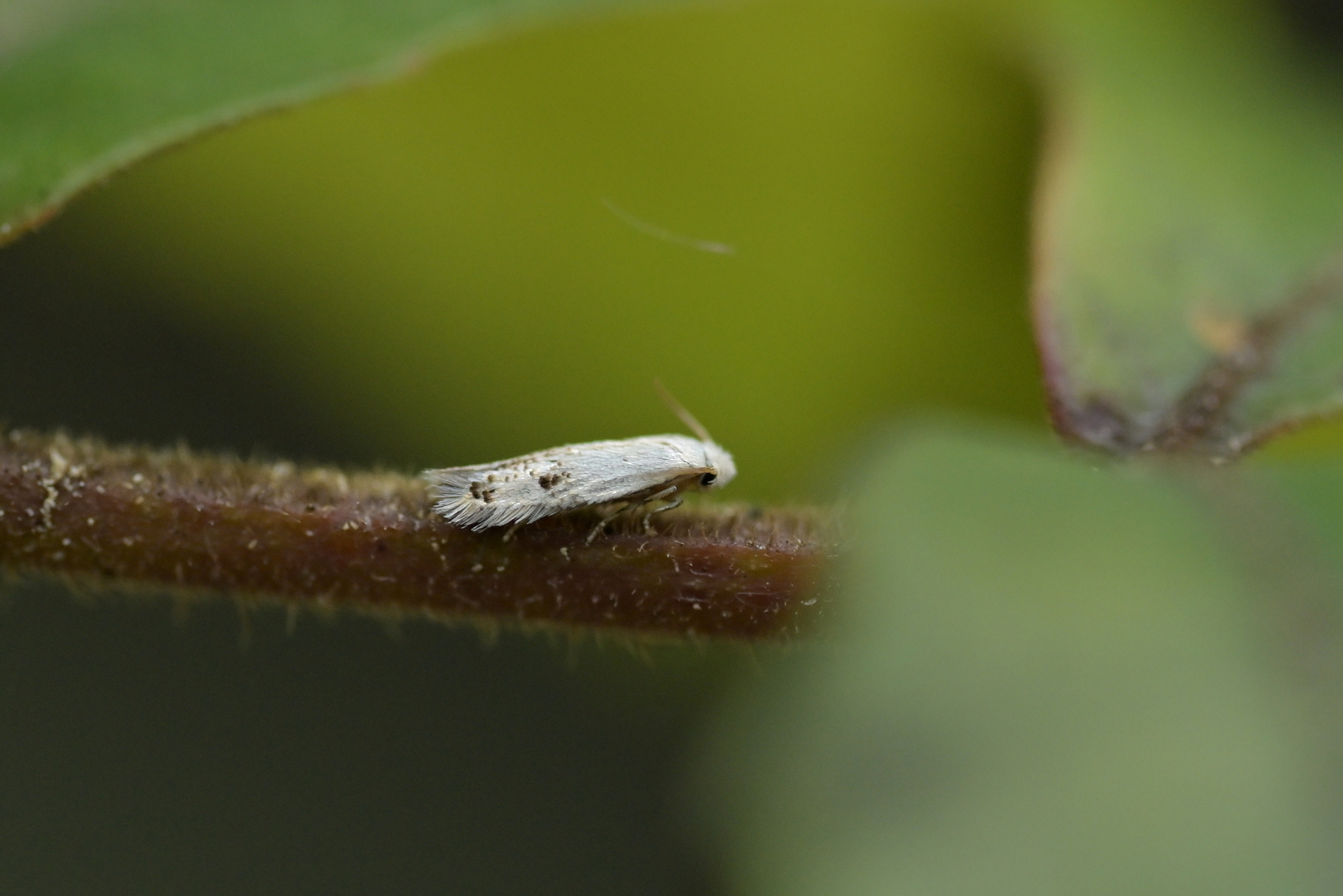
- Female

Conservation status
- Not Threatened (NZ TCS)

Scientific classification
- Kingdom: Animalia
- Phylum: Arthropoda
- Class: Insecta
- Order: Lepidoptera
- Family: Nepticulidae
- Genus: Stigmella
- Species: S. maoriella

Binomial name
- Stigmella maoriella (Walker, 1864)

Synonyms
- Tinea maoriella Walker, 1864; Nepticula maoriella (Walker, 1864)

= Stigmella maoriella =

Species of moth

Stigmella maoriella, the pigmy leafminer moth, is a species of moth of the family Nepticulidae. It is endemic to New Zealand and is found from Auckland to Hawke's Bay. Larvae are leaf miners of species in the genus Olearia. Adults have been observed on the wing in October. This species is classified as Not Threatened by the Department of Conservation.

== Taxonomy ==
This species was first described by Francis Walker in 1864 and named Tinea maoriella using three specimens collected by Lt Col Daniel Bolton, RE. In 1988 John S. Dugdale assigned the species to the genus Stigmella. In 1989, Hans Donner and Christopher Wilkinson confirmed this placement in their monograph on New Zealand Nepticulidae. This placement was again confirmed in a 2016 revision of the global species placed in the family Nepticulidae. The lectotype specimen, collected in Auckland, is held at the Natural History Museum, London.

== Description ==
Walker described the species as follows:

Female. Cinereous, shining. Head white. Palpi very short. Fore wings rounded at the tips, with a short transverse dark cinereous line near the base, and with two dark cinereous bands, each of which contains a black point; space along the exterior border with black speckles. Length of the body 1 line; of the wings 2 1/2 lines.

Donner and Wilkinson described the adult male of this species as follows:

Head. Frontal tuft, scape, and collar white with an occasional brown scale; antenna silvery grey-brown. Thorax grey-brown. Forewing about 3 mm long; ground colour brownish grey, speckled with brown scales, with a brown distal spot and a brown medial spot; fringe brown. Hindwing grey-brown; fringe concolorous. Abdomen brownish grey.

They pointed out that the lectotype and the two paralectotypes held at the Natural History Museum, London are all male and that, as at 1989, the female of this species was not yet known. However since that time further observations, including of females of this species, have occurred. Donner and Wilkinson also pointed out that this species can be differentiated from its close relatives S. ogygia and S. hakekeae as S. maoriella lacks the large cornutus (the spine-like sclerite) on the aedeagus of the male of the species. S. maoriella is also larger than S. ilsea.

== Distribution ==
This species is endemic to New Zealand. It is found from Auckland to Hawke's Bay.

== Habitat and host species ==
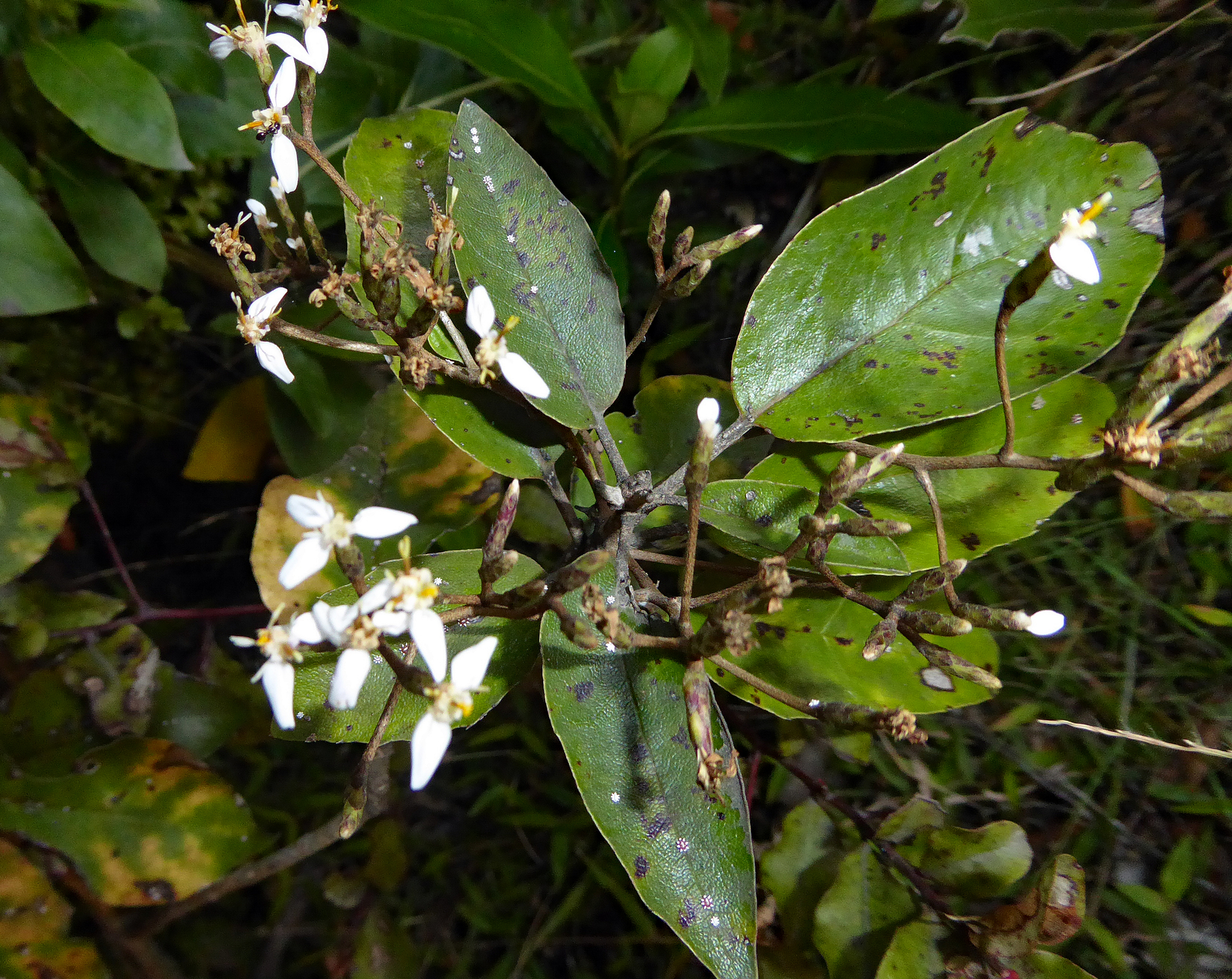
Olearia furfuracea, a larval host plant.

The larvae of this species feed on Olearia species.

== Behaviour ==
Adults of this species has been observed on the wing in October.

== Conservation status ==
This species has been classified as being "Not Threatened" under the New Zealand Threat Classification System.
