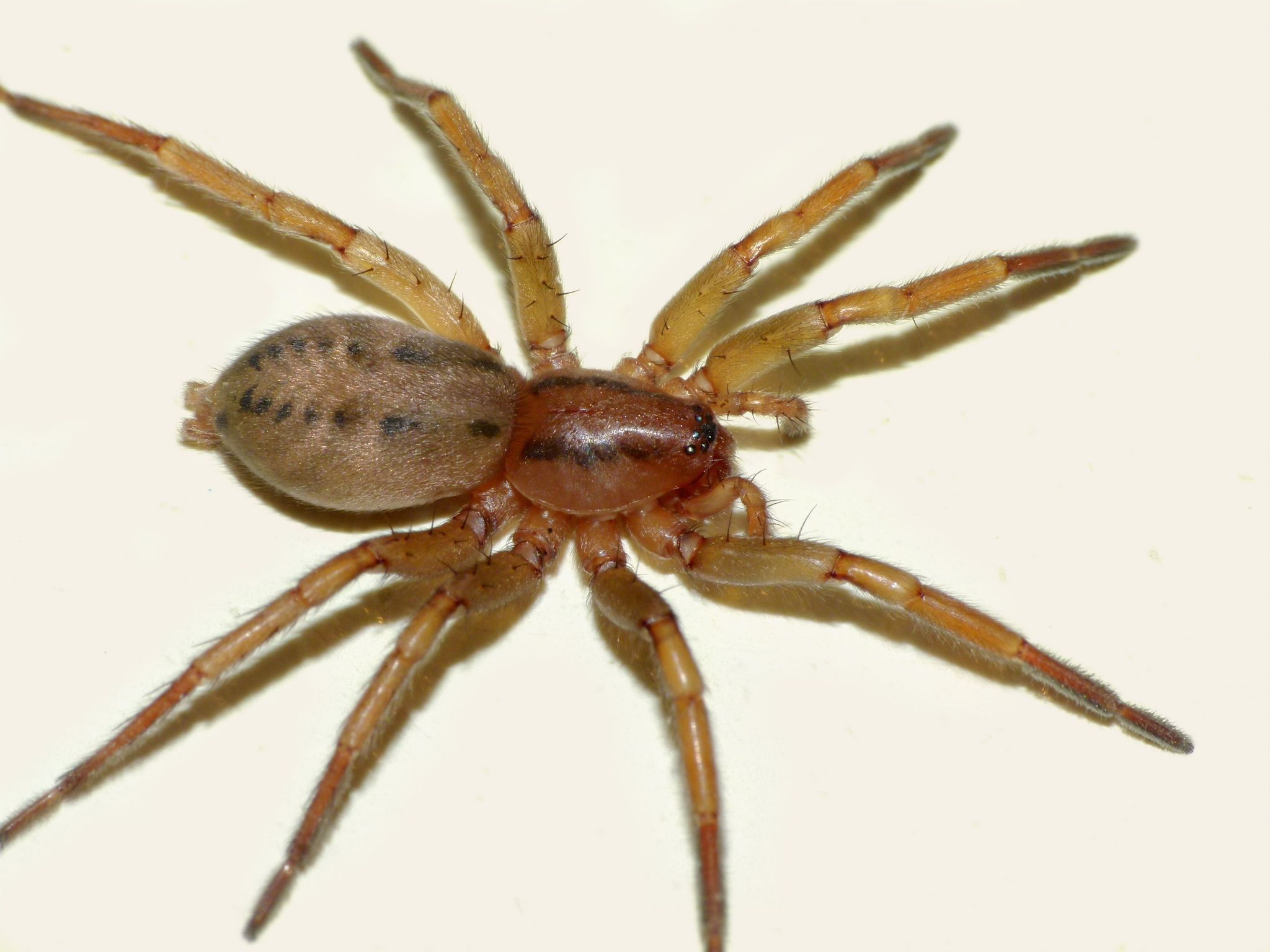

Conservation status
- Not Threatened (NZ TCS)

Scientific classification
- Kingdom: Animalia
- Phylum: Arthropoda
- Subphylum: Chelicerata
- Class: Arachnida
- Order: Araneae
- Infraorder: Araneomorphae
- Family: Gnaphosidae
- Genus: Notiodrassus
- Species: N. distinctus

Binomial name
- Notiodrassus distinctus Bryant, 1935

= Notiodrassus distinctus =

Species of spider

Notiodrassus distinctus is a species of ground spider endemic to New Zealand.

== Taxonomy ==
This species was described by Elizabeth Bryant in 1935 from male specimens. It is the type specimen of the Notiodrassus genus. It was most recently revised in 1979 by Ray Forster. The holotype is stored in Canterbury Museum.

== Description ==
The male is recorded at 8mm in length. The carapace is coloured yellow brown with a pair of dark brown bands The legs are orange brown. The abdomen is creamy brown with a blackish chevron pattern dorsally.

== Distribution ==
This species is endemic to New Zealand. It is known from the South Island where it occurs in the southern regions.

== Conservation status ==
Under the New Zealand Threat Classification System, this species is listed as "Not Threatened".
