= Stathmopoda albimaculata =

- Live specimen

Conservation status
- Nationally Endangered (NZ TCS)

Scientific classification
- Kingdom: Animalia
- Phylum: Arthropoda
- Clade: Pancrustacea
- Class: Insecta
- Order: Lepidoptera
- Family: Stathmopodidae
- Genus: Stathmopoda
- Species: S. albimaculata

Binomial name
- Stathmopoda albimaculata Philpott, 1931

Species of moth endemic to New Zealand

Stathmopoda albimaculata is a species of moth in the Stathmopodidae family. It was first described by Alfred Philpott in 1931. This species is endemic to New Zealand and has been observed in the lower half of the South Island. It favours habitat that includes the various Olearia species that is said to host its larvae. It has also been found to inhabit lowland podocarp native forest. Adults are on the wing between the months of October and February. S. albimaculata is classified as Nationally Endangered by the Department of Conservation.

== Taxonomy ==
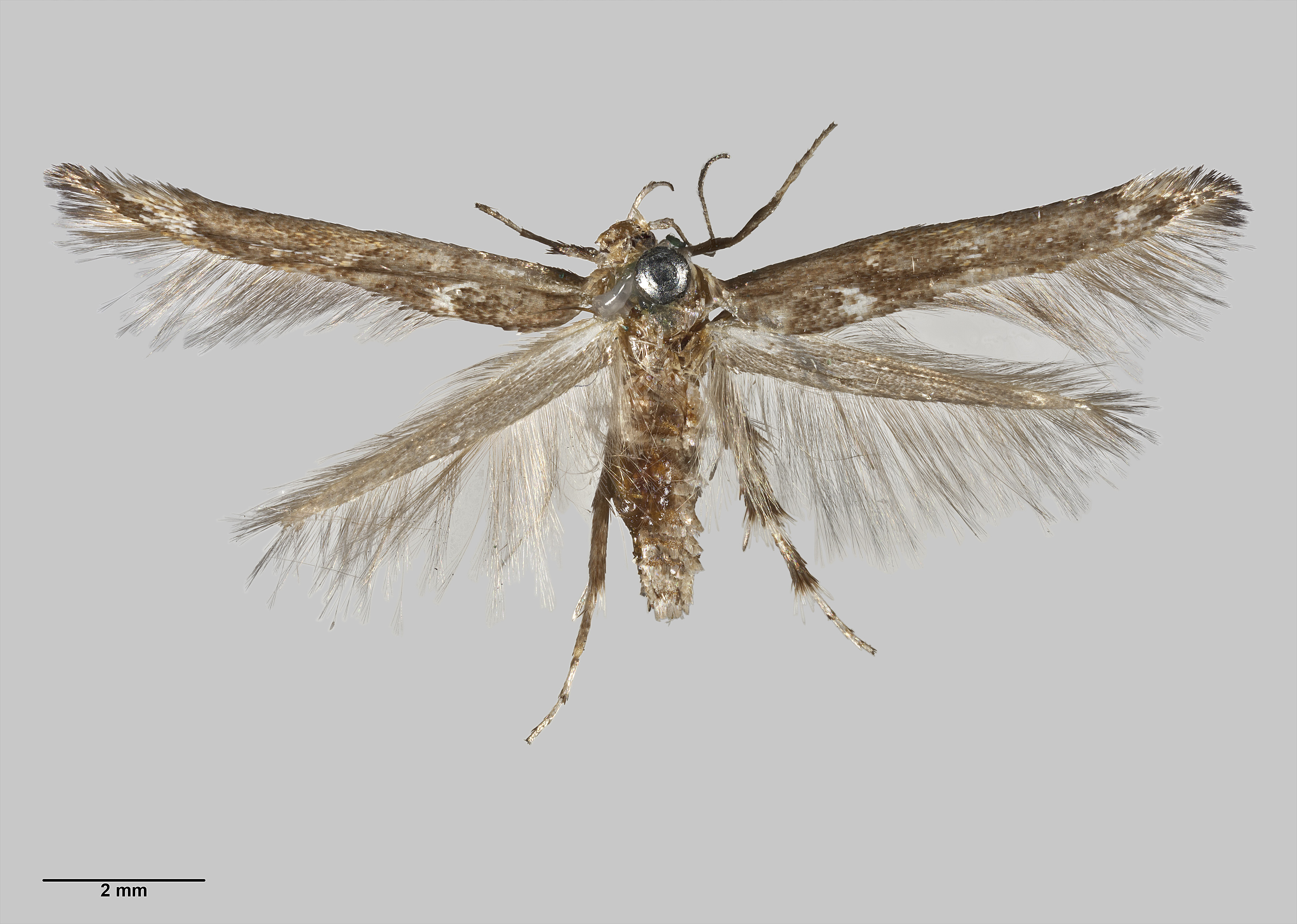
Female holotype specimen of S. albimaculata.

S. albimaculata was first described by Alfred Philpott in 1931. Philpott based his description on a female specimen collected by Charles E. Clarke at Woodside, Taieri in December. George Hudson also used this specimen to describe and figure the species in his 1939 publication A supplement to the butterflies and moths of New Zealand. This holotype is held at the Auckland War Memorial Museum.

== Description ==
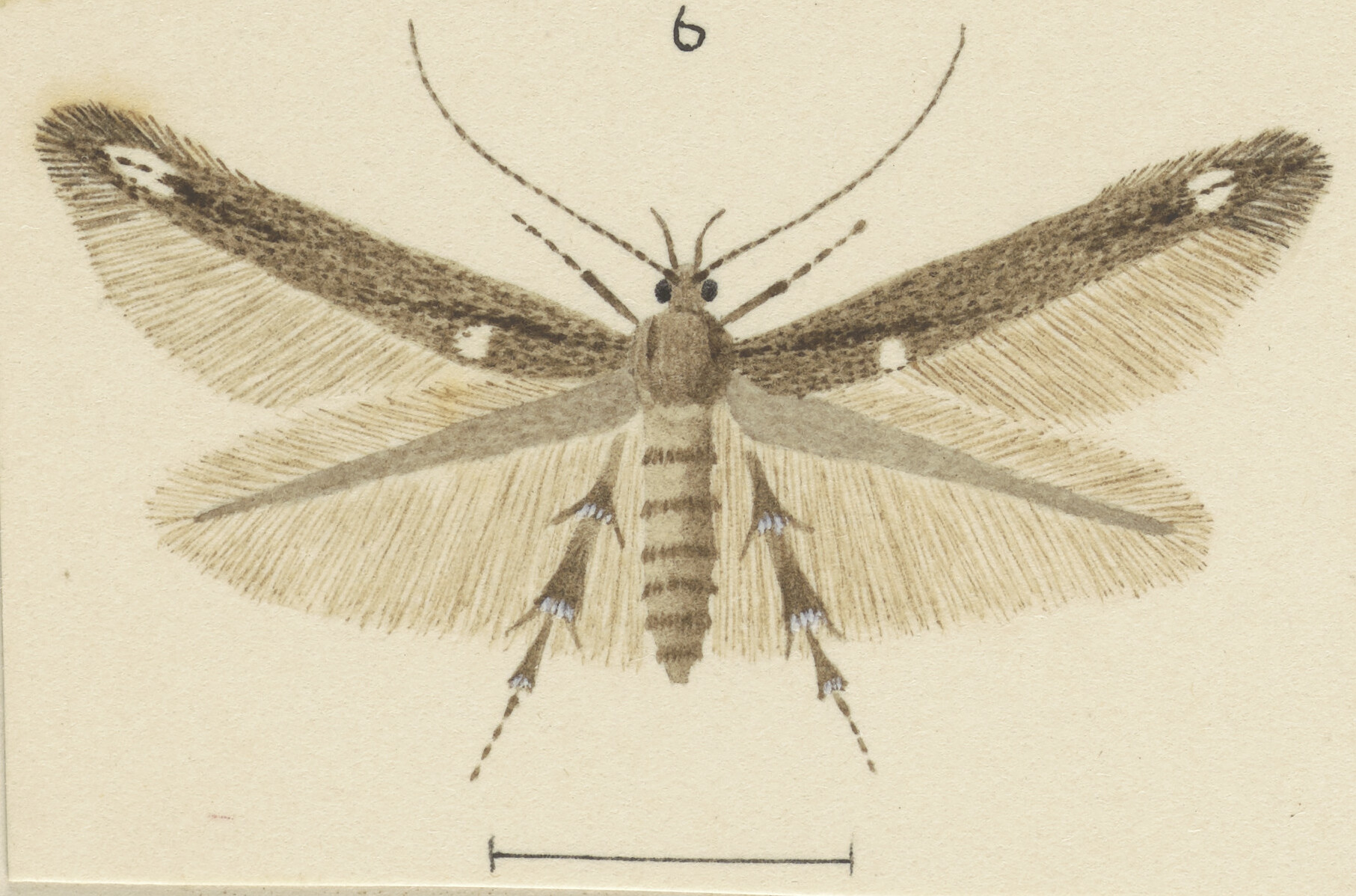
Illustration of female by Hudson.

Philpott described this species as follows:

♂. 15 mm. Head, palpi and thorax grey mixed with fuscous. Antennae greyish fuscous. Abdomen grey mixed with fuscous and ochreous. Legs fuscous, whorls of spines on posterior pair white. Forewings with costa almost straight, subsinuate, apex rounded, termen extremely oblique; dull greyish fuscous, a little darker on and below fold; an irregular white blotch below fold towards base; a similar blotch near apex: fringes greyish fuscous round apex dark fuscous. Hindwings and fringes greyish fuscous.

Philpott pointed out that the two white patches on the forewings of this species are distinctive.

== Distribution ==
S. albimaculata is endemic to New Zealand. As well as being collected at Taieri, this species has also been observed in central and western Otago, The Catlins, Southland, and the Waitaki Valley.

== Habitat and ecology ==
This species inhabits locations at altitudes from 30 metres (98 ft) up to 900 metres (3,000 ft). Along with habitat that includes the various Olearia species that host S. albimaculata, this moth has also been found to inhabit lowland podocarp/hardwood forest. Adult moths are on the wing between the months of October and February. Adults are most commonly observed in January and February.

== Host plants ==
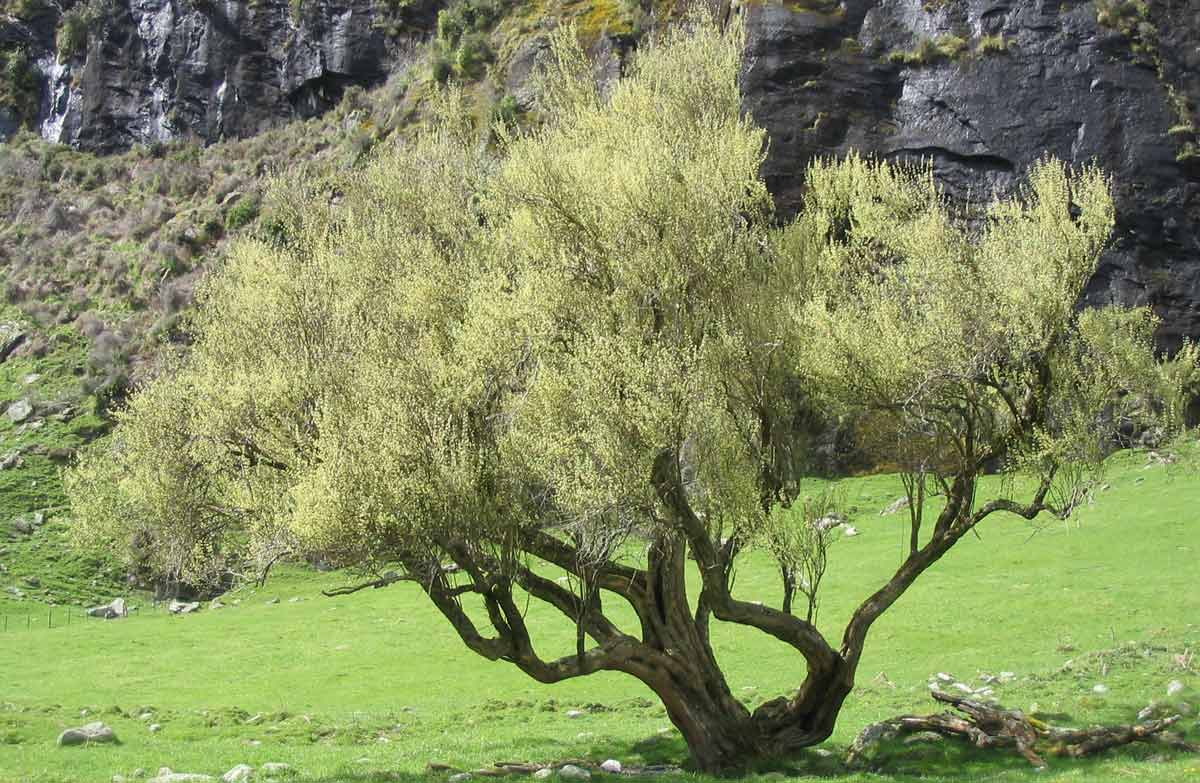
Olearia hectorii, plant host species of S. albimaculata.

The species is said to be associated with the nationally endangered plant Olearia hectorii, as well as Olearia odorata and Olearia virgata.

== Conservation status ==
As at 2015, S. albimaculata has been classified under the New Zealand Threat Classification system as being Nationally Endangered.
