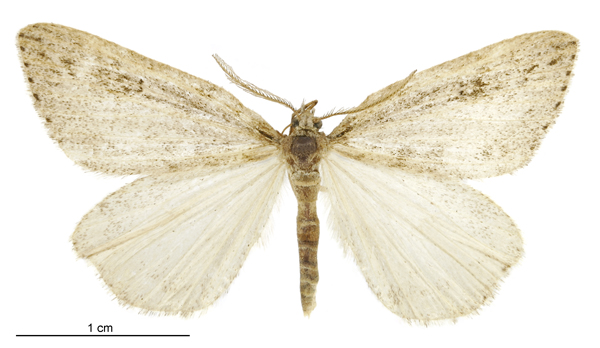
- Male
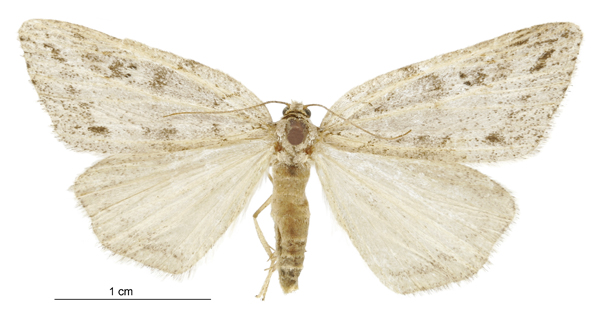
- Female

Conservation status
- Nationally Vulnerable (NZ TCS)

Scientific classification
- Kingdom: Animalia
- Phylum: Arthropoda
- Clade: Pancrustacea
- Class: Insecta
- Order: Lepidoptera
- Family: Geometridae
- Genus: Pseudocoremia
- Species: P. cineracia

Binomial name
- Pseudocoremia cineracia (Howes, 1942)

Synonyms
- Selidosema cineracia Howes, 1942

= Pseudocoremia cineracia =

Species of moth endemic to New Zealand

Pseudocoremia cineracia is a species of moth in the family Geometridae. It is endemic to New Zealand and is found in the central and southern parts of the South Island. This species inhabits montane shrublands. Adults are on the wing from August to June and have been collected via sugar traps. Larvae feed on Olearia odorata. This species is classified as Nationally Vulnerable by the Department of Conservation.

== Taxonomy ==
This species was first described by George Howes in 1942 from specimens obtained at Moke Lake and taken in January and February. Howes originally named it Selidosema cineracia. This name was also used when the species was discussed by George Vernon Hudson in 1950. In 1988 John S. Dugdale assigned the species to the genus Pseudocoremia. This classification of the species into Pseudocoremia is regarded as unsatisfactory. As such the species is also currently known as Pseudocoremia (s.l.) cineracia. The holotype specimen is held at the Museum of New Zealand Te Papa Tongarewa.

== Description ==
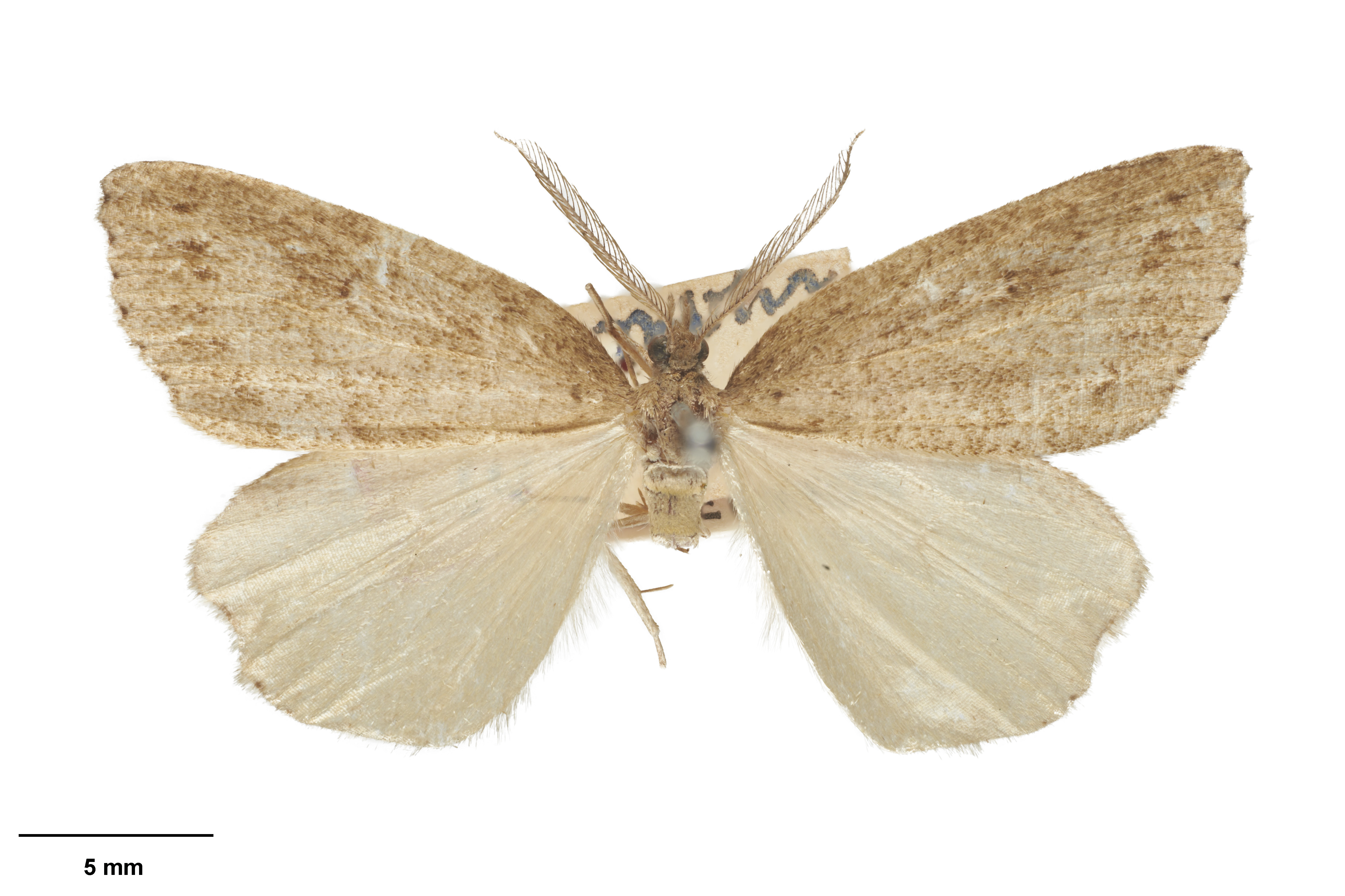
Male holotype.

The larvae are coloured grey.

Howes described the adult male of the species as follows:

Wing expanse, 30 mm. Head and thorax ash-grey. Antennae grey-brown. Abdomen ochreous. Forewings pale brownish- ochreous-brown. Strongly arched at base, then almost straight to apex. Termen slightly bent inwards from centre to tornus. Basal line faintly indicated by a short dark line below centre of wing, with a dark streak below centre outwardly angled towards dorsum. Claviform shows as a slight dot with a surrounding darker suffusion. Reniform faintly shown clouded with dark brown with a small dark dot in centre. Submarginal very slightly pale - the terminal line indistinct, with a terminal series of small dark dots. Cilia ochreous - very short. Veins faintly indicated in grey. Lower wings pale ochreous without markings and with a definite incurving at about one-third along termen. Cilia light ochreous and very short. Underside evenly ochreous white, the hindwings a shade lighter. No appearance of lunule.

== Distribution ==
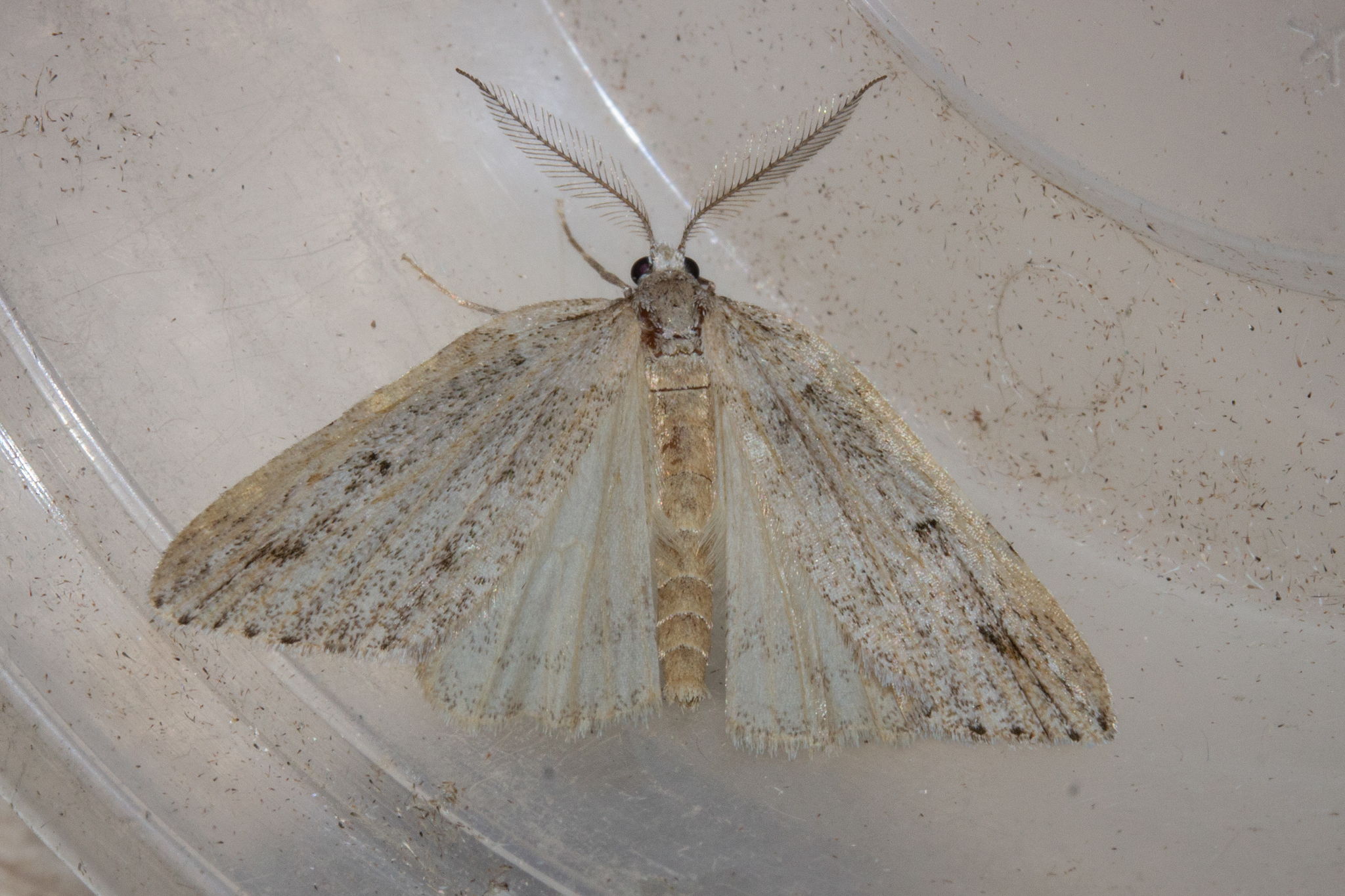
Living specimen.

This species is endemic to New Zealand. The species range of this moth is Mackenzie, Central Otago and Otago Lakes. Other than its type locality, this species occurs at Stony Beach at Okains Bay, Big Spur Creek & Cluden Stream at Cluden Station in Otago and Kawarau Gorge.

== Biology and host species ==
The host species of this moth is Olearia odorata. Adults are attracted to sugar traps. They are on the wing August until June with the species being more commonly observed in September.

== Habitat ==
P. cineracia inhabits montane shrublands at an altitude of between 150-850m.

== Conservation status ==
In 2025 this species was again classified under the New Zealand Threat Classification system as being Nationally Vulnerable. P. cineracia is classified as nationally vulnerable partially because of its reliance on its host plant which is suffering a decline as a result of habitat destruction.
