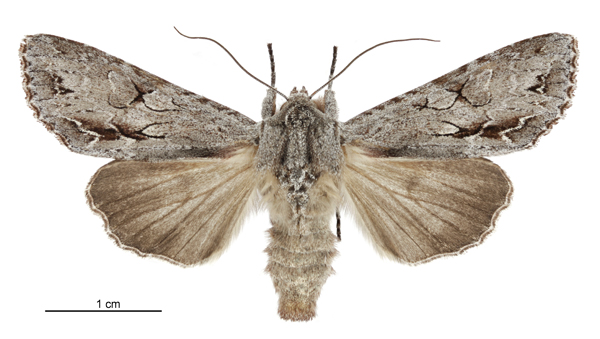
- Female
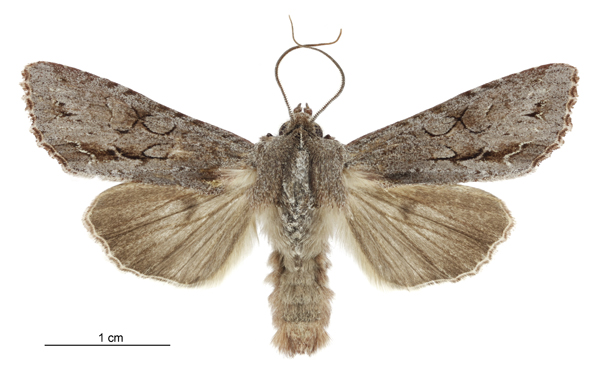
- Male

Scientific classification
- Kingdom: Animalia
- Phylum: Arthropoda
- Clade: Pancrustacea
- Class: Insecta
- Order: Lepidoptera
- Superfamily: Noctuoidea
- Family: Noctuidae
- Genus: Ichneutica
- Species: I. ustistriga

Binomial name
- Ichneutica ustistriga (Walker, 1857)

Synonyms
- Xylina lignisecta Walker, 1857; Xylina ustistriga Walker, 1857; Melanchra ustistriga (Walker, 1857); Graphania ustistriga (Walker, 1857); Graphania lignisecta (Walker, 1857)

= Ichneutica ustistriga =

Species of moth

Ichneutica ustistriga, also known as the large grey owlet, is a moth of the family Noctuidae. It is endemic to New Zealand and can be found from the Three Kings Islands to Stewart Island. This species lives in a wide variety of habitats including domestic gardens, horticultural areas, orchards, native and exotic grasslands, as well as native forest. The larvae eat a variety of herbaceous plants. Recorded food plants include Muehlenbeckia australis, Muehlenbeckia complexa, Olearia hectorii, and Plantago lanceolata. This moth has a mauvish grey wing colour and is unlikely to be confused with other species as the patterns on its forewing are distinctive. This species is on the wing throughout the year and is attracted to both sugar and light traps. Adult moths can be found at rest on fences and tree trunks during the day.

== Taxonomy ==
This species was described by Francis Walker in 1857 using a specimen obtained from William Colenso. The female lectotype is held at the Natural History Museum, London. In 1988 J. S. Dugdale placed this species within the Graphania genus. In 2019 Robert Hoare undertook a major review of New Zealand Noctuidae. During this review the genus Ichneutica was greatly expanded and the genus Graphania was subsumed into that genus as a synonym. As a result of this review, this species is now known as Ichneutica ustistriga.

== Description ==
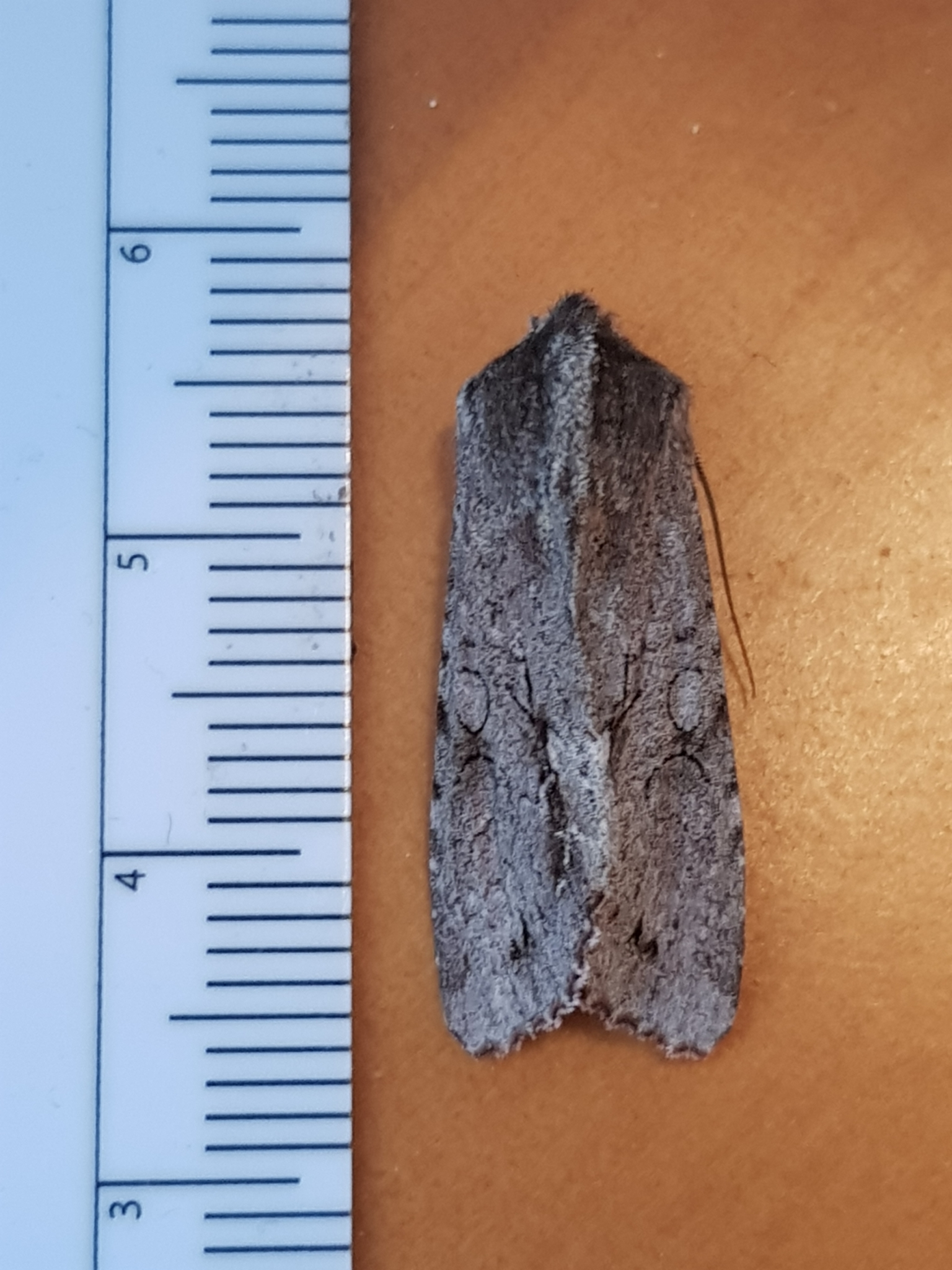
Observation of Ichneutica ustistriga.

George Hudson describes the egg of this species as follows:

The egg is semi-globose, pale green, with numerous branching ribs radiating from the micropyle and faint transverse ribs between them.

Hudson described the larva of this species as follows:

The larva is dull greyish-brown with blackish subdorsal and lateral lines; there is a series of pale spots below the subdorsal line, and an obscure whitish streak below the lateral line.

Walker originally described the adults of this species as follows:

Cinereous, tinged with brown. Abdomen pale cinereous, reddish ferruginous at the tip. Fore wings with three very irregular black discal ringlets, with a very incomplete ferruginous-brown band near the exterior border, with a distinct ferruginous brown streak near the interior angle, and with ferruginous marks along the costa; ciliae ferruginous. Hind wings brownish. Length of the body 7 — 8 lines; of the wings 16 — 18 lines.

The adult male of this species has a wingspan of between 36 and 46 mm where as the female has a wingspan of between 38 and 53 mm. This moth has a mauvish grey wing colour and is unlikely to be confused with other species as the patterns on its forewing are distinctive.

== Distribution ==
It is endemic to New Zealand and can be found from the Three Kings Islands to Stewart Island.

== Habitat ==
This species lives in a wide variety of habitats including domestic gardens, horticultural areas, orchards, native and exotic grasslands, as well as native forest.

== Behaviour ==
This species is on the wing throughout the year and is attracted to both sugar and light traps. Adult moths can be found at rest on fences and tree trunks during the day.

== Life history and host species ==
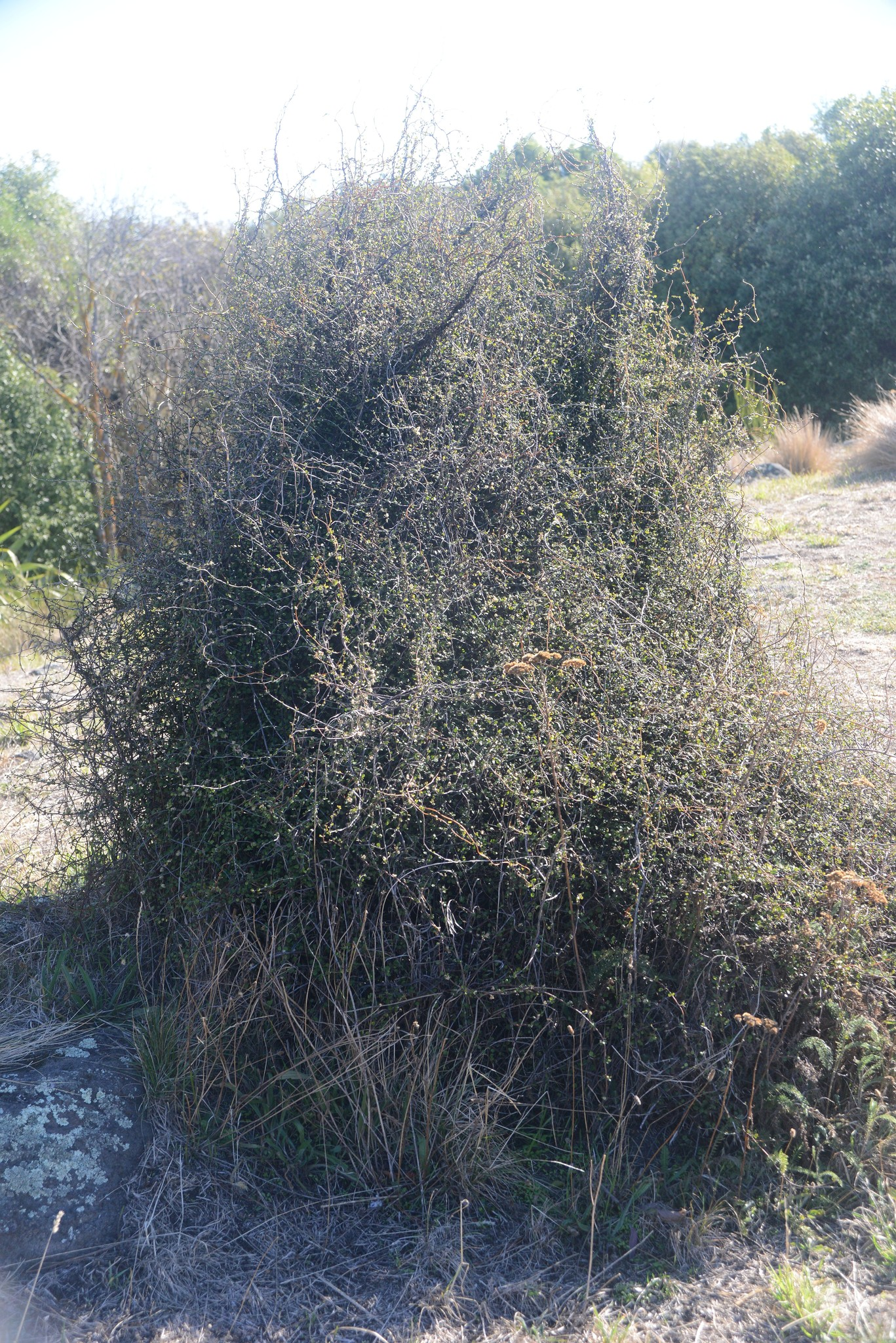
Muehlenbeckia complexa, a larval host species of I. ustistriga

The larvae eat a variety of herbaceous plants. Recorded food plants include Muehlenbeckia australis, Muehlenbeckia complexa, Olearia hectorii, and Plantago lanceolata.

== Interaction with humans ==
A study in 2021 suggests this moth may be assisting with the pollination of avocado trees.
