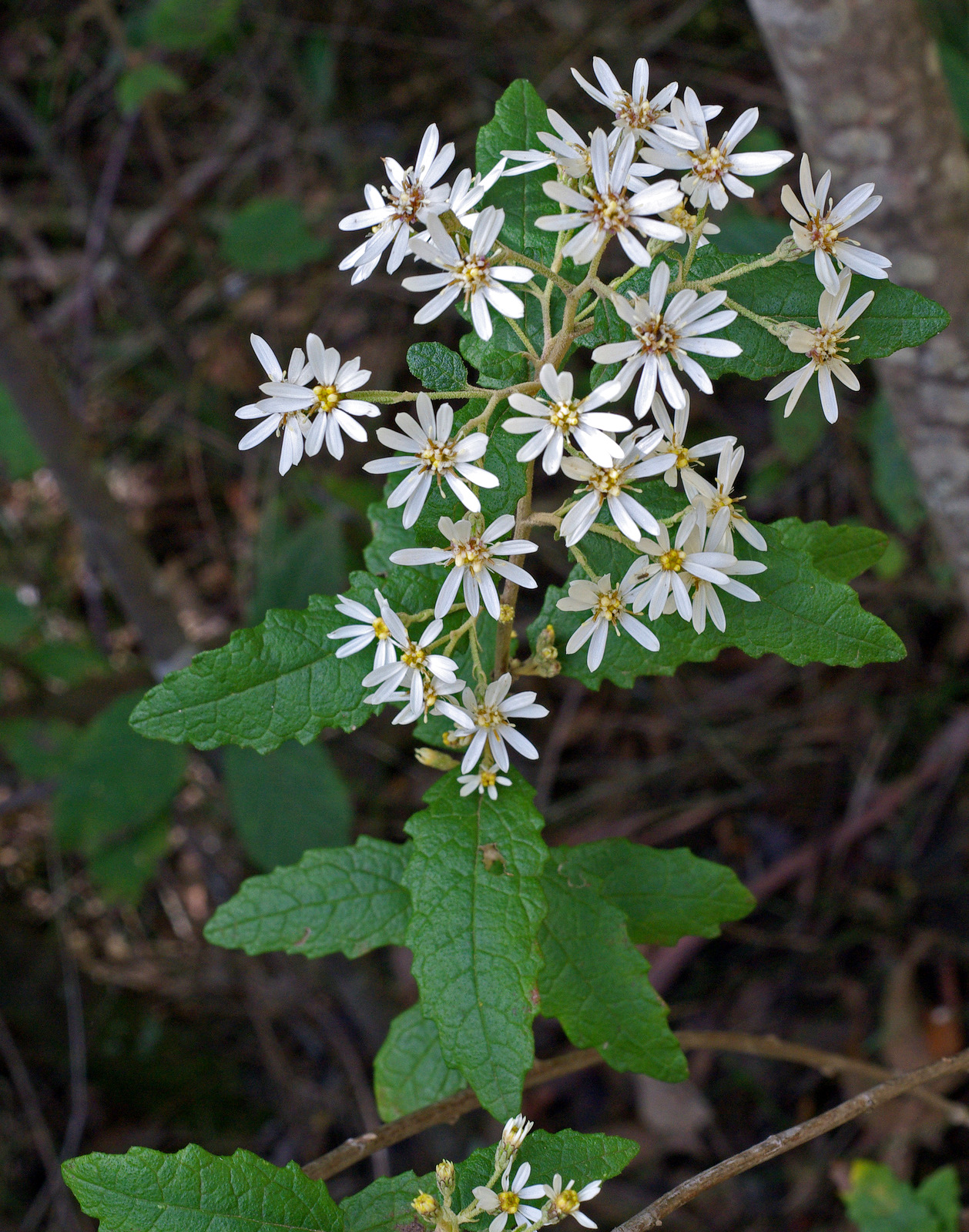

Scientific classification
- Kingdom: Plantae
- Clade: Embryophytes
- Clade: Tracheophytes
- Clade: Angiosperms
- Clade: Eudicots
- Clade: Asterids
- Order: Asterales
- Family: Asteraceae
- Genus: Olearia
- Species: O. rugosa

Binomial name
- Olearia rugosa (F.Muell. ex W.Archer bis) Hutch.

= Olearia rugosa =

Wrinkled daisy-bush

Species of flowering plant

Olearia rugosa, commonly known as wrinkled daisy-bush, is a species of flowering plant in the family Asteraceae. It has alternate, wrinkled leaves and white daisy-like flowers and is endemic to south-eastern Australia.

== Description ==
Olearia rugosa is sometimes a spindly shrub to 2.5 m (8 ft 2 in) high with branchlets densely covered in star-shaped, short matted hairs. The leaves are arranged alternately, almost sessile or with a petiole, broadly elliptic, oblong or egg-shaped, 7–80 mm (0.28–3.15 in) long, usually 7–25 mm (0.28–0.98 in) wide, green on the upper surface, veined, wrinkled, warty, some with finer occasional star-shaped hairs and densely covered in grey-brown, soft hairs on the under surface. The leaf margins are broadly toothed to scalloped, flat or curved under, rarely smooth. The flower head is 20–25 mm (0.79–0.98 in) in diameter, borne in upper leaf axils or at the end of branches singly or in corymbs on a peduncle 0.5–5 cm (0.20–1.97 in) long. The white flowers are in groups of 8-13, ligules 7–10 mm (0.28–0.39 in) long, centres yellow or purplish. The bracts toothed, margins sometimes purple coloured, densely covered with short, matted, star-shaped hairs or only near the apex. The dry fruit is cylindrical, one-seeded, ribbed, 2–2.5 mm (0.079–0.098 in) long, smooth or with a moderate covering of silky hairs.

== Taxonomy and naming ==
This species was first formally described in 1861 by William Archer who gave it the name Eurybia rugosa in the Journal of the Proceedings of the Linnean Society, Botany, from an unpublished description by Ferdinand von Mueller. In 1917 John Hutchinson changed the name to Olearia rugosa in The Gardeners' Chronicle. The specific epithet (rugosa) means "wrinkled".

In 2013, five subspecies of O. rugosa were described in Australian Systematic Botany and the names are accepted by the Australian Plant Census:

- Olearia rugosa subsp. allenderae (J.H.Willis) Hawke ex Messina, (originally described in 1967 by James Hamlyn Willis as O. allenderae in the journal Muelleria †) has elliptic, egg-shaped or narrowly triangular leaves 16–45 mm (0.63–1.77 in) long and 9–25 mm (0.35–0.98 in) wide, with an arrow-head shaped, heart-shaped or shortened base.
- Olearia rugosa subsp. angustifolia Hawke ex Messina has narrowly linear to oblong leaves 35–65 mm (1.4–2.6 in) long and 3–10 mm (0.12–0.39 in) wide, with a shortened or wedge-shaped base.
- Olearia rugosa subsp. distaliloba Hawke ex Messina has elliptic to oblong or egg-shaped leaves with the narrower end towards the base leaves 28–65 mm (1.1–2.6 in) long and 15–30 mm (0.59–1.18 in) wide, with a narrowed base.
- Olearia rugosa subsp. intermedia Messina has leaves that are intermediate in shape between those of subsp. allenderae and subsp. angustifolia.
- Olearia rugosa (F.Muell. ex W.Archer bis) Hutch. subsp. rugosa has egg-shaped to elliptic or lance-shaped leaves 40–100 mm (1.6–3.9 in) long and 17–28 mm (0.67–1.10 in) wide, with a shortened to broadly wedge-shaped base.

† The type specimens of O. allenderae were collected by Marie Allender.

== Distribution and habitat ==
Subspecies allenderae grows in swampy areas or on gully slopes in forest and is restricted to Wilsons Promontory National Park and subsp. angustifolia usually grows in streams or swamps in near-coastal areas of East Gippsland in Victoria. Subspecies distaliloba grows in mountain forest, often in gullies and depressions, from far south-eastern New South Wales and east of the Snowy River in Victoria. Subspecies intermedia is restricted to some Bass Strait Islands and north-eastern Tasmania and subsp. rugosa is found in moist forests, mostly on the Great Dividing Range between Mount Macedon and Drouin in central southern Victoria.

== Conservation status ==
Subspecies allenderae is listed as "endangered" under the Victorian Government Flora and Fauna Guarantee Act 1988.
