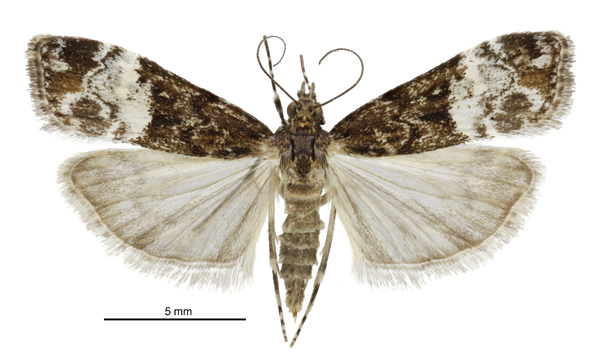
- Female

Scientific classification
- Kingdom: Animalia
- Phylum: Arthropoda
- Class: Insecta
- Order: Lepidoptera
- Family: Crambidae
- Genus: Eudonia
- Species: E. minusculalis

Binomial name
- Eudonia minusculalis (Walker, 1866)

Synonyms
- Scoparia minusculalis Walker, 1866; Scoparia minisculalis (Walker, 1866) misspelling

= Eudonia minusculalis =

Species of moth

Eudonia minusculalis is a moth of the family Crambidae. It was described by Francis Walker in 1866. It is endemic to New Zealand. Adult moths have been recorded as visiting the flowers of Leptospermum scoparium and likely feeding from and pollinating them.
