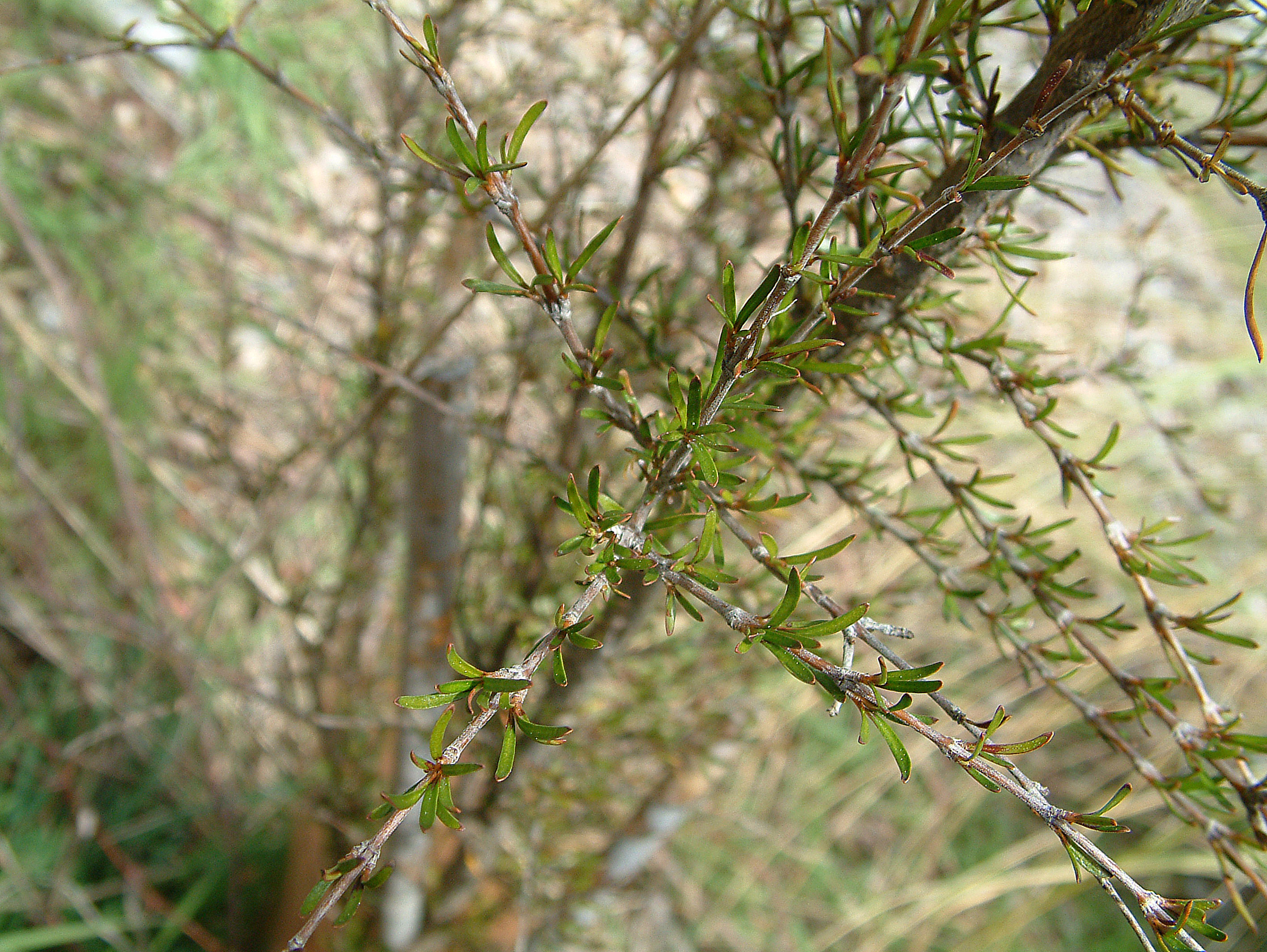

Scientific classification
- Kingdom: Plantae
- Clade: Tracheophytes
- Clade: Angiosperms
- Clade: Eudicots
- Clade: Asterids
- Order: Asterales
- Family: Asteraceae
- Genus: Olearia
- Species: O. bullata

Binomial name
- Olearia bullata H.D.Wilson et Garn.-Jones

= Olearia bullata =

Species of shrub

Olearia bullata is a small divaricating shrub endemic to New Zealand, from the plant family Asteraceae. It has small brownish green leaves with a large amount of interlacing twigs, and grows to approximately 3 metres in height.
