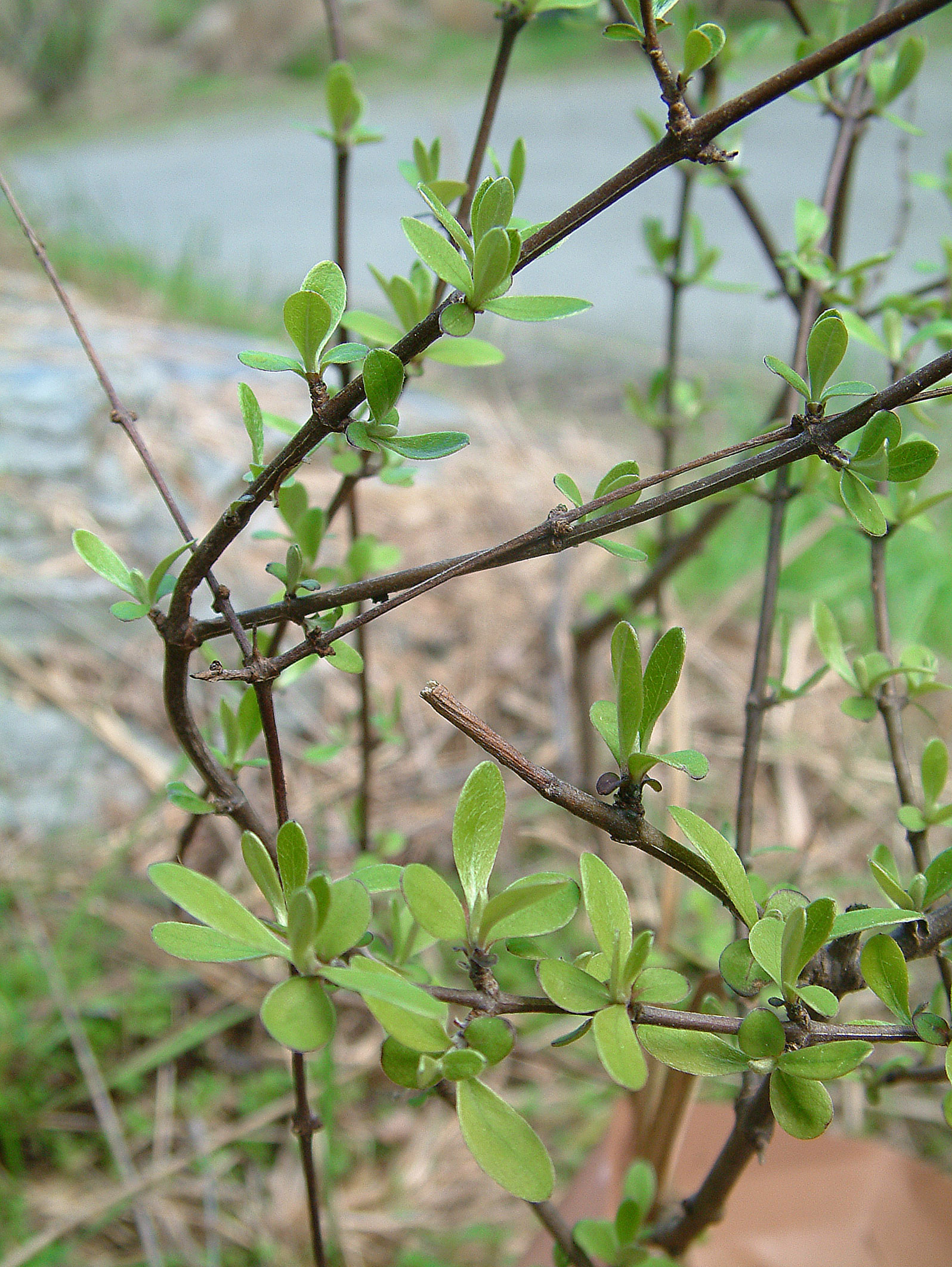

Scientific classification
- Kingdom: Plantae
- Clade: Embryophytes
- Clade: Tracheophytes
- Clade: Spermatophytes
- Clade: Angiosperms
- Clade: Eudicots
- Clade: Asterids
- Order: Asterales
- Family: Asteraceae
- Genus: Olearia
- Species: O. odorata

Binomial name
- Olearia odorata Petrie

= Olearia odorata =

Species of shrub endemic to New Zealand

Olearia odorata, the scented tree daisy, is a small divaricating shrub endemic to New Zealand's South Island, from the plant family Asteraceae. It has small light green leaves with a large amount of interlacing twigs and grows to around 2–4 metres in height. In spring O. odorata produces many small white flowers.

Remnants of this bush that grow in Otago are home to native moths and insects, and areas with this species are now being protected with covenants. This plant is a host for moth larvae including the nationally endangered Stathmopoda albimaculata and the nationally vulnerable Pseudocoremia cineracia.
