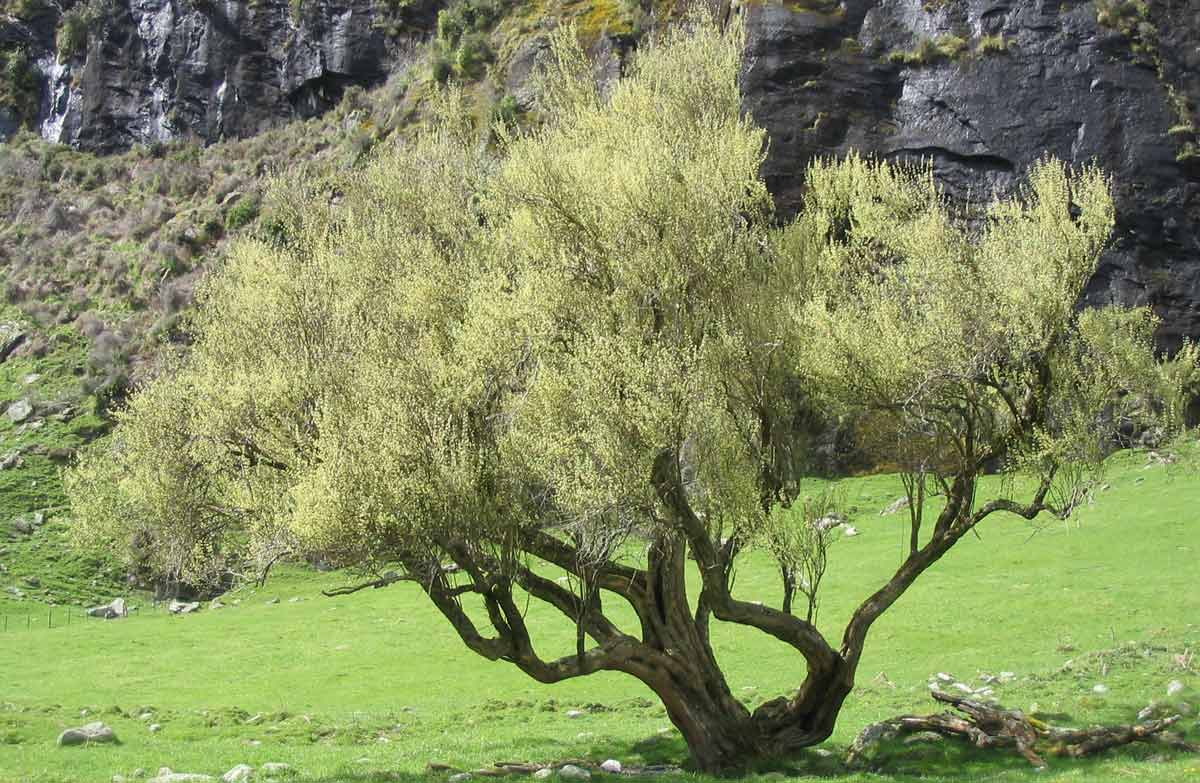

Conservation status
- Endangered (IUCN 2.3)

- Nationally Endangered (NZ TCS)

Scientific classification
- Kingdom: Plantae
- Clade: Tracheophytes
- Clade: Angiosperms
- Clade: Eudicots
- Clade: Asterids
- Order: Asterales
- Family: Asteraceae
- Genus: Olearia
- Species: O. hectorii

Binomial name
- Olearia hectorii Hook.f.

= Olearia hectorii =

Species of flowering plant

Olearia hectorii is a species of flowering plant in the daisy family Asteraceae. Its common names include deciduous tree daisy and Hector's tree daisy. It is endemic to New Zealand, where it is nationally endangered.

== Taxonomy ==
Members of the genus Olearia, commonly known as daisy-bushes or tree daisies, are found in New Zealand, Australia, and New Guinea. Although originally published under the name Olearia hectori, hectorii is the correct epithet under the ICBN (ST Louis) Art. 60.11.

== Description ==
Olearia hectorii is a deciduous shrub or small tree, up to 10 metres (33 feet) tall, with reddish stems, furrowed bark, and oppositely-arranged clusters of 2–4 gray-green leaves, 20–50 mm long by 5–20 mm wide. The undersides of the leaves are covered in a silvery indumentum. As with most other Asteraceae, the tiny flowers are borne in dense clusters known as pseudanthia, which are produced on short, hairy stems from near the leaf axils. The florets are pale yellow, and enclosed by pale green, densely hairy phyllaries. The seeds are cypselae, similar in structure to those of dandelions, consisting of a 1–2 mm achene attached to a 3–5 mm feathery pappus.

== Ecology ==
This species is threatened by habitat degradation. It requires open habitat for germination, but this kind of habitat is threatened by introduced flora and grazing animals.

Olearia hectorii is a host of numerous endemic moth species and is known to support at least 23 species, with at least 12 of those species exclusively hosted by this plant. These moths are likely to play an important role in the pollination of the O. hectorii. Species dependent on this plant include the nationally critically endangered Stathmopoda campylocha and the nationally endangered S. albimaculata.

== Conservation status ==
This plant is now classified under the New Zealand Threat Classification System as being Nationally Endangered.
