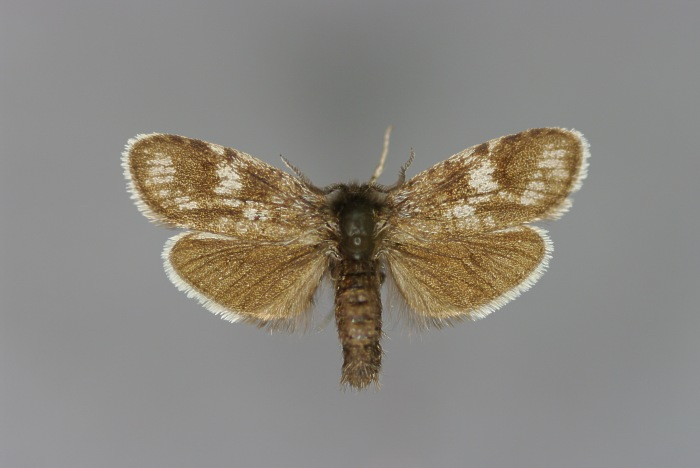

Scientific classification
- Kingdom: Animalia
- Phylum: Arthropoda
- Class: Insecta
- Order: Lepidoptera
- Family: Psychidae
- Genus: Typhonia
- Species: T. beatricis

Binomial name
- Typhonia beatricis Hättenschwiler, 2000

Synonyms
- Typhonia beatricensis

= Typhonia beatricis =

Species of moth

Typhonia beatricis is a moth of the Psychidae family. It is found in Switzerland, where it is thought to be an introduced species. The species is possible endemic to the eastern Mediterranean region.
