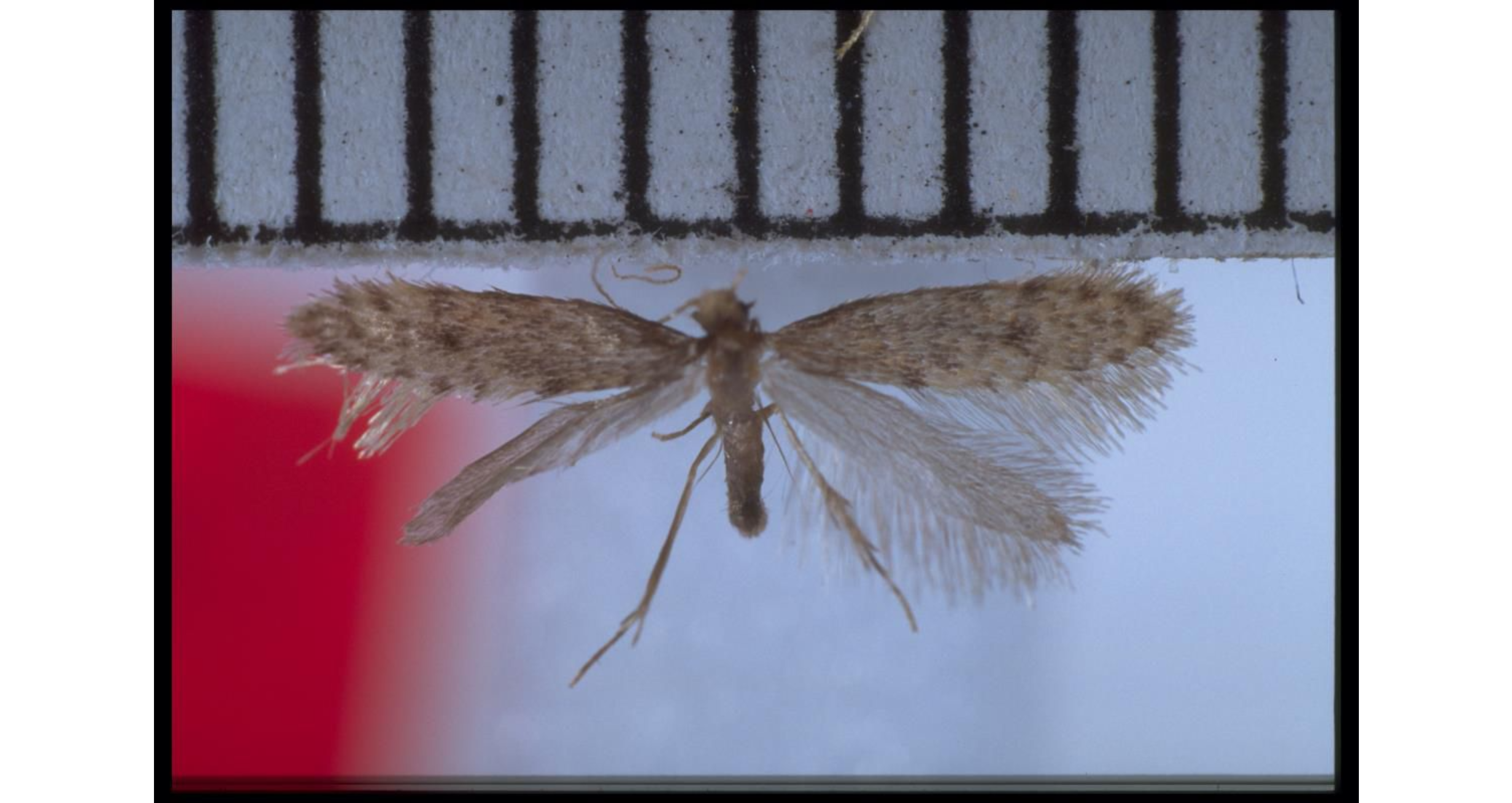
- Holotype

Scientific classification
- Kingdom: Animalia
- Phylum: Arthropoda
- Clade: Pancrustacea
- Class: Insecta
- Order: Lepidoptera
- Family: Psychidae
- Genus: Grypotheca
- Species: G. pertinax

Binomial name
- Grypotheca pertinax Dugdale, 1987

= Grypotheca pertinax =

Species of moth endemic to New Zealand

Grypotheca pertinax is a moth of the Psychidae family first described by John S. Dugdale in 1987. It is endemic to New Zealand.
