= Monda afra =

Scientific classification
- Kingdom: Animalia
- Phylum: Arthropoda
- Clade: Pancrustacea
- Class: Insecta
- Order: Lepidoptera
- Family: Psychidae
- Genus: Monda
- Species: M. afra

Binomial name
- Monda afra Bethune-Baker, 1927

Species of moth

Monda afra is a moth in the family Psychidae. It was described by George Thomas Bethune-Baker in 1927. It is found in Cameroon.

The wingspan is about 32 mm. The forewings are black above vein two and the terminal area is more greyish and extends onto the termen, the rest of the wing is subhyaline (almost glass like) white. The hindwings are subhyaline white, slightly greyish next to the termen.
