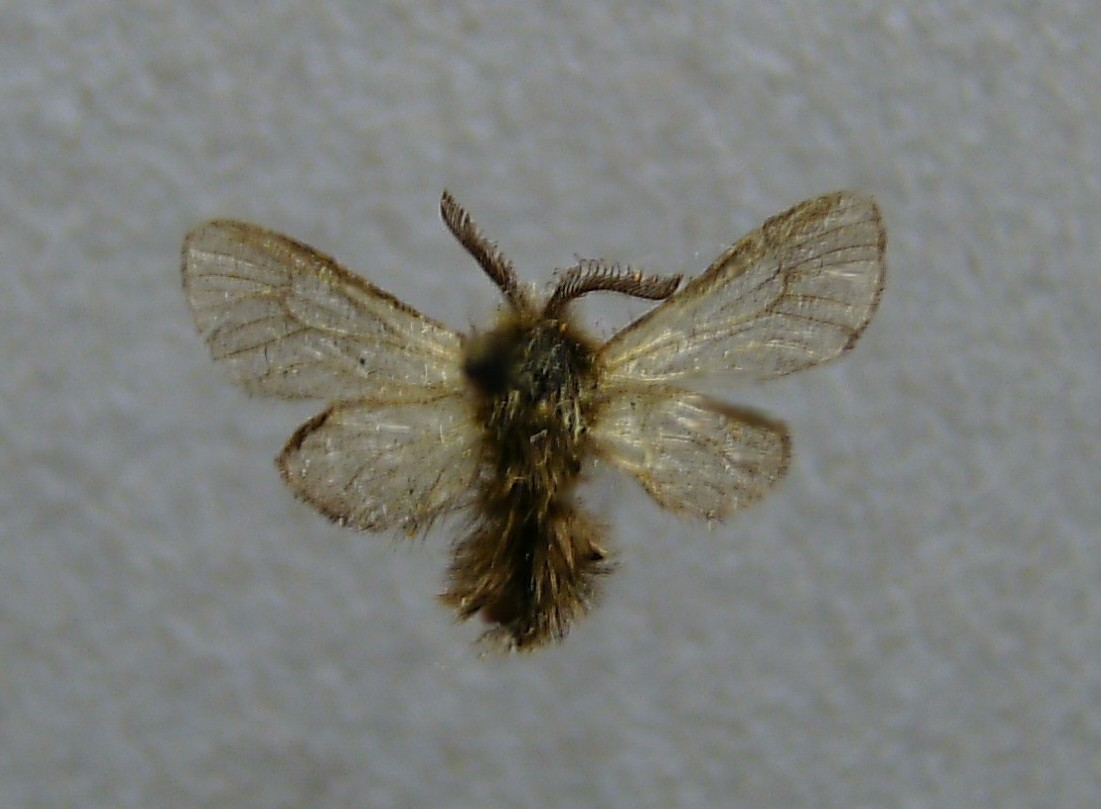

Scientific classification
- Domain: Eukaryota
- Kingdom: Animalia
- Phylum: Arthropoda
- Class: Insecta
- Order: Lepidoptera
- Family: Psychidae
- Genus: Phalacropterix
- Species: P. graslinella

Binomial name
- Phalacropterix graslinella (Boisduval, 1852)

Synonyms
- Psyche graslinella Boisduval, 1852

= Phalacropterix graslinella =

Species of moth

Phalacropterix graslinella is a species of moth of the Psychidae family. It is found from France to southern Russia and from northern Italy to Fennoscandia and the Baltic region.

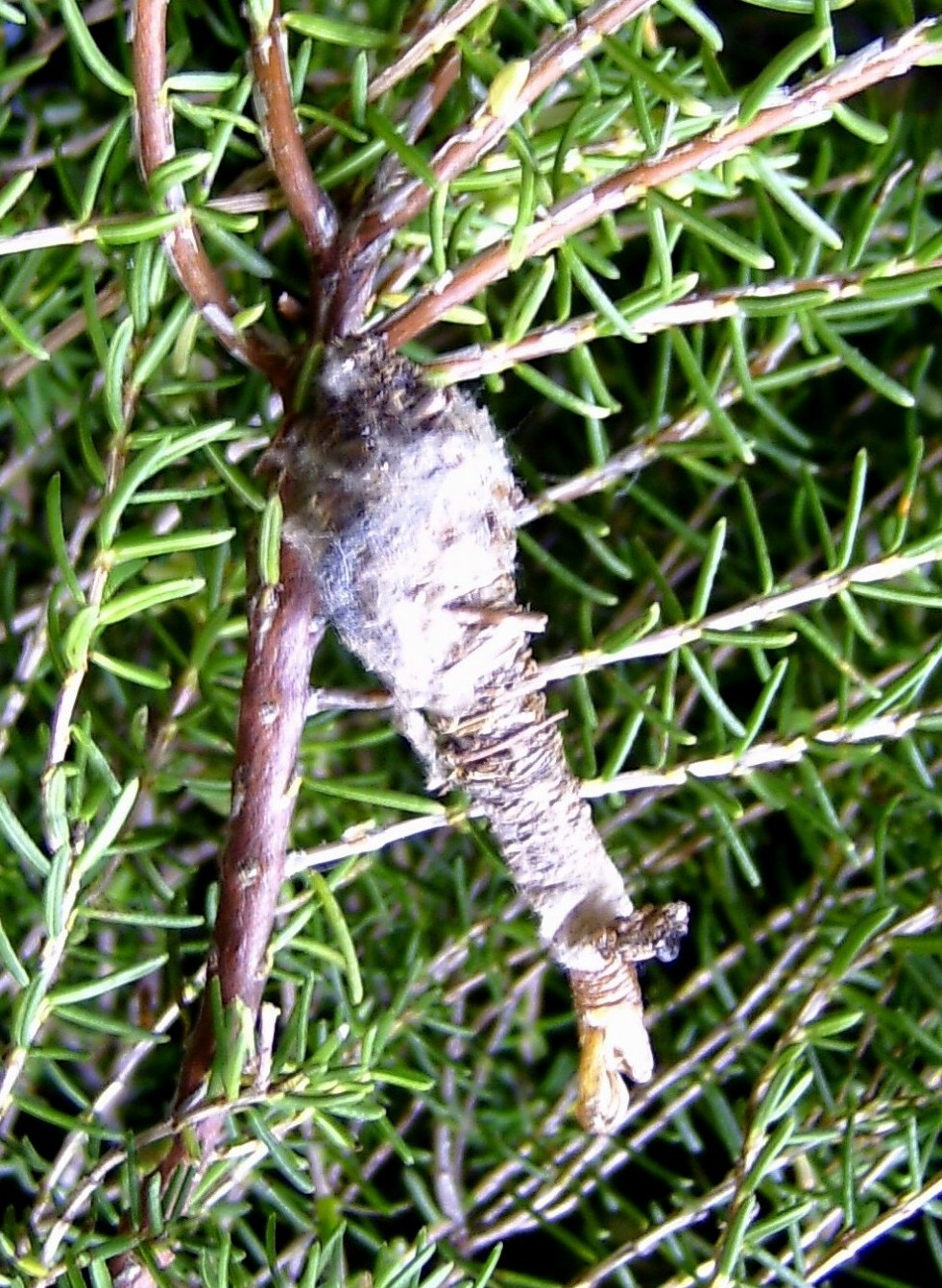
Phalacropterix graslinella case

The wingspan is 17–21 mm for males. Females are wingless.

The larvae feed on Erica, including Empetrum nigrum, Calluna and possibly Vaccinium.
