= Typhonia metherca =

Scientific classification
- Kingdom: Animalia
- Phylum: Arthropoda
- Class: Insecta
- Order: Lepidoptera
- Family: Psychidae
- Genus: Typhonia
- Species: T. metherca

Binomial name
- Typhonia metherca (Meyrick, 1916)

Synonyms
- Melasina metherca Meyrick, 1905

Species of moth

Typhonia metherca is a moth of the family Psychidae first described by Edward Meyrick in 1916. It is found in Sri Lanka.
