= Heylaertsia nudilineata =

Scientific classification
- Kingdom: Animalia
- Phylum: Arthropoda
- Clade: Pancrustacea
- Class: Insecta
- Order: Lepidoptera
- Family: Psychidae
- Genus: Heylaertsia
- Species: H. nudilineata

Binomial name
- Heylaertsia nudilineata (Hampson, [1893])

Synonyms
- Psyche (Heylaertsia) nudilineata Hampson, [1893]; Babula nudilineata Hampson, 1893

Species of moth

Heylaertsia nudilineata is a moth of the family Psychidae first described by George Hampson in 1893. It is found in Sri Lanka.
