= Typhonia frenigera =

Scientific classification
- Kingdom: Animalia
- Phylum: Arthropoda
- Class: Insecta
- Order: Lepidoptera
- Family: Psychidae
- Genus: Typhonia
- Species: T. frenigera

Binomial name
- Typhonia frenigera (Meyrick, 1911)

Synonyms
- Melasina frenigera Meyrick, 1911

Species of moth

Typhonia frenigera is a moth of the family Psychidae first described by Edward Meyrick in 1911. It is found in Sri Lanka.
