= Heylaertsia quadripuncta =

Scientific classification
- Kingdom: Animalia
- Phylum: Arthropoda
- Clade: Pancrustacea
- Class: Insecta
- Order: Lepidoptera
- Family: Psychidae
- Genus: Heylaertsia
- Species: H. quadripuncta

Binomial name
- Heylaertsia quadripuncta (Hampson, [1897])

Synonyms
- Psyche (Heylaertsia) quadripuncta Hampson, 1897

Species of moth

Heylaertsia quadripuncta is a moth of the family Psychidae first described by George Hampson in 1897. It is found in Sri Lanka.
