= Scoriodyta virginella =

Scientific classification
- Domain: Eukaryota
- Kingdom: Animalia
- Phylum: Arthropoda
- Class: Insecta
- Order: Lepidoptera
- Family: Psychidae
- Genus: Scoriodyta
- Species: S. virginella

Binomial name
- Scoriodyta virginella Hättenschwiler, 1989

Synonyms
- Scoriodyta virginella f. minima Hättenschwiler, 1989

Species of moth

Scoriodyta virginella is a moth of the Psychidae family. It was described by Haettenschwiler in 1989. It is found in New Zealand.
