= Conoeca psammogona =

Scientific classification
- Kingdom: Animalia
- Phylum: Arthropoda
- Class: Insecta
- Order: Lepidoptera
- Family: Psychidae
- Genus: Conoeca
- Species: C. psammogona

Binomial name
- Conoeca psammogona (Meyrick, 1931)

Synonyms
- Narycia psammogona Meyrick, 1931

Species of moth

Conoeca psammogona is a species of bagworm that is known from Imerina in central Madagascar.

== Biology ==
The length of the bag of the male is 16 mm.

== See also ==
- List of moths of Madagascar
