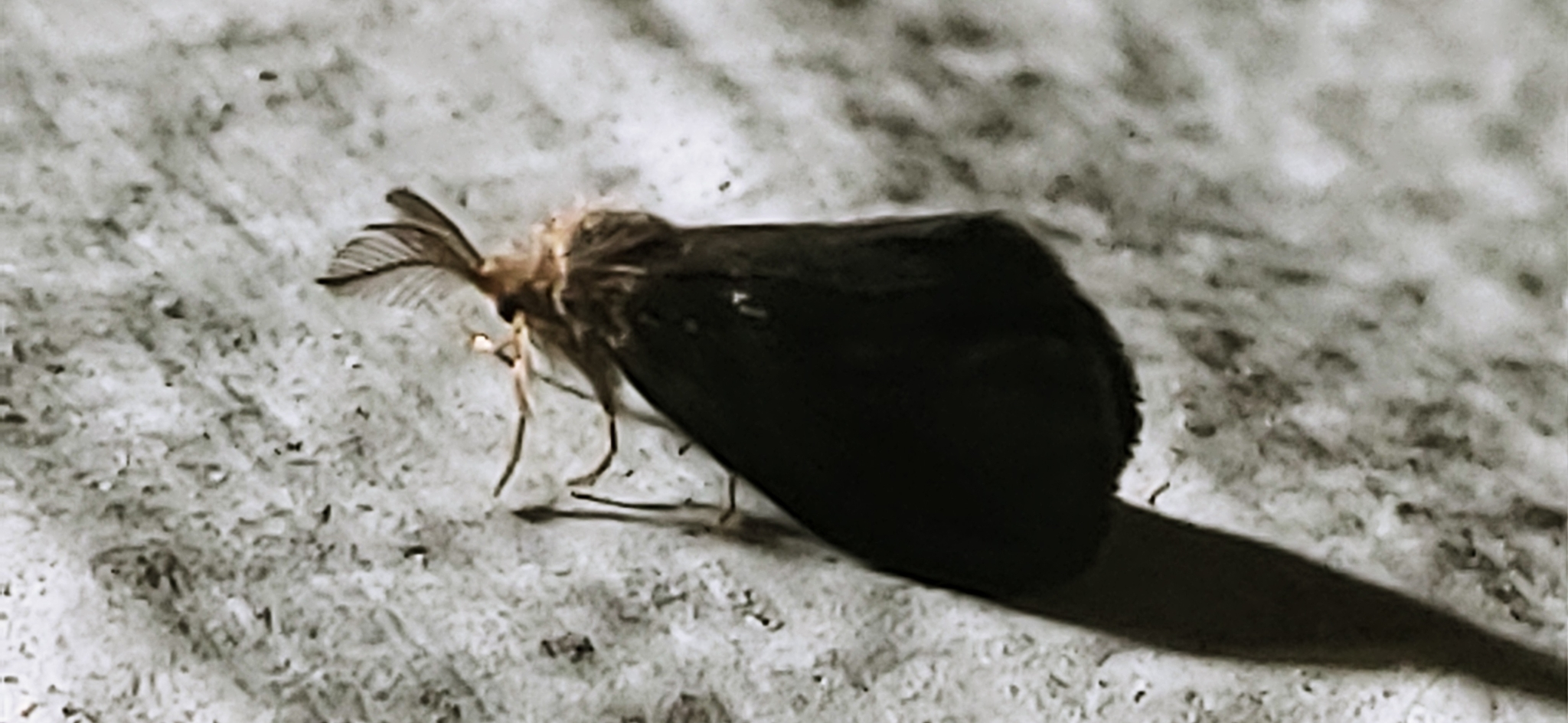
- Cryptothelea gloverii

Scientific classification
- Domain: Eukaryota
- Kingdom: Animalia
- Phylum: Arthropoda
- Class: Insecta
- Order: Lepidoptera
- Family: Psychidae
- Genus: Cryptothelea
- Species: C. gloverii

Binomial name
- Cryptothelea gloverii (Packard, 1869)

Synonyms
- Cryptothelea gloveri (lapsus); Platoeceticus gloveri (lapsus); Platoeceticus gloverii

= Cryptothelea gloverii =

Species of moth

Cryptothelea gloverii is a species of bagworm moth. Its native range includes North and Central America.

It favors orange trees, and also eat the camphor scale (Pseudaonidia duplex), a scale insect.
