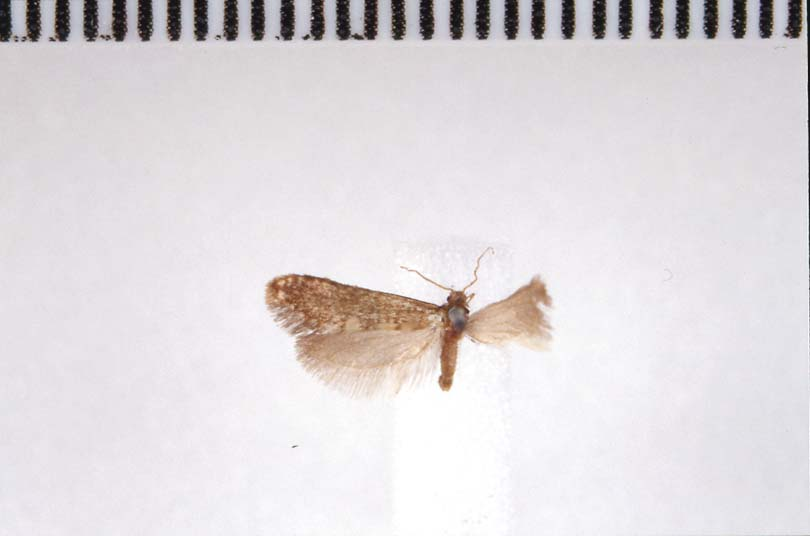

Scientific classification
- Kingdom: Animalia
- Phylum: Arthropoda
- Clade: Pancrustacea
- Class: Insecta
- Order: Lepidoptera
- Family: Psychidae
- Genus: Grypotheca
- Species: G. triangularis

Binomial name
- Grypotheca triangularis (Philpott, 1930)

Synonyms
- Talaeporia triangularis Philpott, 1930

= Grypotheca triangularis =

Species of moth

Grypotheca triangularis is a moth of the Psychidae family. It was first described by Alfred Philpott in 1930 under the name Talaeporia triangularis. In 1987 John S. Dugdale placed this species within the genus Grypotheca. It is endemic to New Zealand.
