= Typhonia energa =

Scientific classification
- Kingdom: Animalia
- Phylum: Arthropoda
- Class: Insecta
- Order: Lepidoptera
- Family: Psychidae
- Genus: Typhonia
- Species: T. energa

Binomial name
- Typhonia energa (Meyrick, 1905)

Synonyms
- Melasina energa Meyrick, 1905

Species of moth

Typhonia energa is a moth of the family Psychidae first described by Edward Meyrick in 1905. It is found in Sri Lanka.
