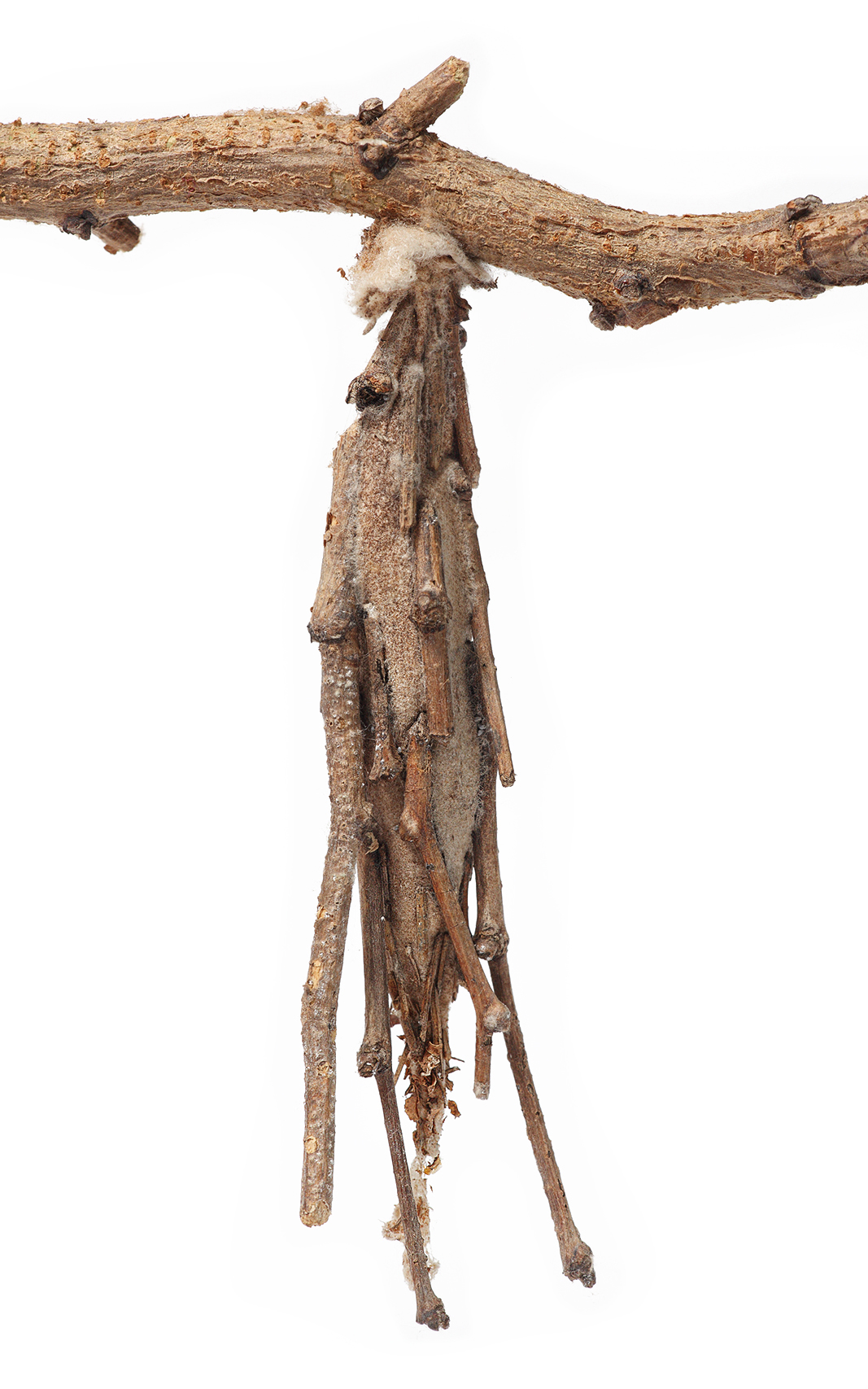
- Metura elongatus caterpillar or pupa inside cocoon

Scientific classification
- Kingdom: Animalia
- Phylum: Arthropoda
- Class: Insecta
- Order: Lepidoptera
- Family: Psychidae
- Genus: Metura; Walker, 1855

Species
- See text

= Metura =

Genus of moths

Metura is a genus of bagworm or case moths in the family Psychidae, endemic to Oceania. The genus contains the largest species of Psychidae known, M. aristocosma, with a larval bag of up to 300 mm and an adult male wingspan of 60 mm.

Metura are polyphagous, where they may be commonly encountered on garden plants in urban areas, or affixed to structures nearby. Like all Psychidae, the larvae construct a protective larval bag which is a portable structure made primarily of silk and adornment, and is carried with them wherever they move. Various natural items are incorporated into the larval bag, such as sticks, leaves, and fragments of wood fibers, and the exact composition of such items may be useful in larval identification.

Although larvae may be commonly encountered, adults are rarely seen. The females are completely wingless and have reduced features, and never leave their larval bag.

== Description ==
Male wingspan 40-63 mm, generally charcoal to black, head and thoracic regions with yellow or orange scales. Exact pattern of thorax, as well as genitalia, are diagnostic to species. Antennae bipectinate to apex, eyes small, legs short, foreleg epiphysis can be present or absent, wing scales mainly class 6, wings with M present in discal cell. Forewing with wing veins Rs2 and Rs3 fused with M2 and M3 from the same stalk, CuP and A fused. Hindwing with Sc, R, and Rs1 fused, M2 and M3 arising closely, CuP free, 3 anal veins present.

Females are simple, scaleless except for corethrogyne, yellow in colour, with reduced eyes, antennae and legs, wingless.

Larvae highly sclerotised, head and thoracic regions orange or cream-orange with black patterns, diagnostic to species.

== Species ==
The genus contains five described species:

- Metura elongatus - eastern Australia
- Metura oceanica - New Caledonia and Vanuatu
- Metura aristocosma - far north Queensland, Australia, and New Guinea
- Metura falcata - Lord Howe Island, Australia
- Metura phyllosacca - eastern Australia

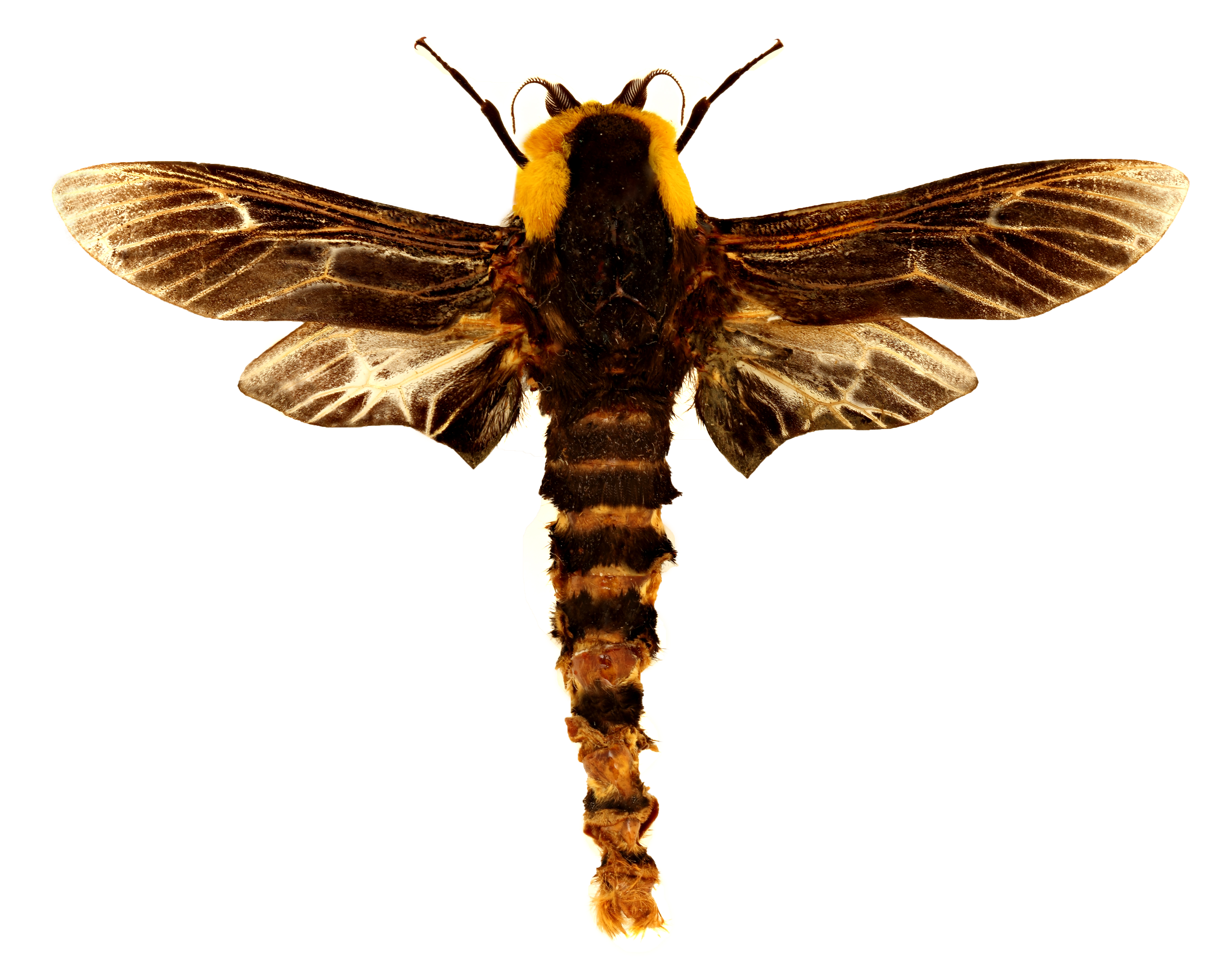
Adult male Metura aristocosma

One species, known from New Guinea, is currently undescribed.
