= Typhonia anasactis =

Scientific classification
- Kingdom: Animalia
- Phylum: Arthropoda
- Class: Insecta
- Order: Lepidoptera
- Family: Psychidae
- Genus: Typhonia
- Species: T. anasactis

Binomial name
- Typhonia anasactis (Meyrick, 1907)

Species of moth

Typhonia anasactis is a moth of the family Psychidae first described by Edward Meyrick in 1907. It is found in Sri Lanka.
