= Typhonia stratifica =

Scientific classification
- Kingdom: Animalia
- Phylum: Arthropoda
- Class: Insecta
- Order: Lepidoptera
- Family: Psychidae
- Genus: Typhonia
- Species: T. stratifica

Binomial name
- Typhonia stratifica (Meyrick, 1907)

Synonyms
- Melasina stratifica Meyrick, 1907

Species of moth

Typhonia stratifica is a moth of the family Psychidae. It was first described by Edward Meyrick in 1907. It is found in Sri Lanka.
