= Typhonia granularis =

Scientific classification
- Kingdom: Animalia
- Phylum: Arthropoda
- Class: Insecta
- Order: Lepidoptera
- Family: Psychidae
- Genus: Typhonia
- Species: T. granularis

Binomial name
- Typhonia granularis (Meyrick, 1916)

Synonyms
- Melasina granularis Meyrick, 1916

Species of moth

Typhonia granularis is a moth of the family Psychidae first described by Edward Meyrick in 1916. It is found in Sri Lanka.
