= Scoriodyta dugdalei =

Scientific classification
- Kingdom: Animalia
- Phylum: Arthropoda
- Class: Insecta
- Order: Lepidoptera
- Family: Psychidae
- Genus: Scoriodyta
- Species: S. dugdalei

Binomial name
- Scoriodyta dugdalei Hättenschwiler, 1989

Species of moth

Scoriodyta dugdalei is a moth of the Psychidae family. It was described by Haettenschwiler in 1989. It is endemic to New Zealand.
