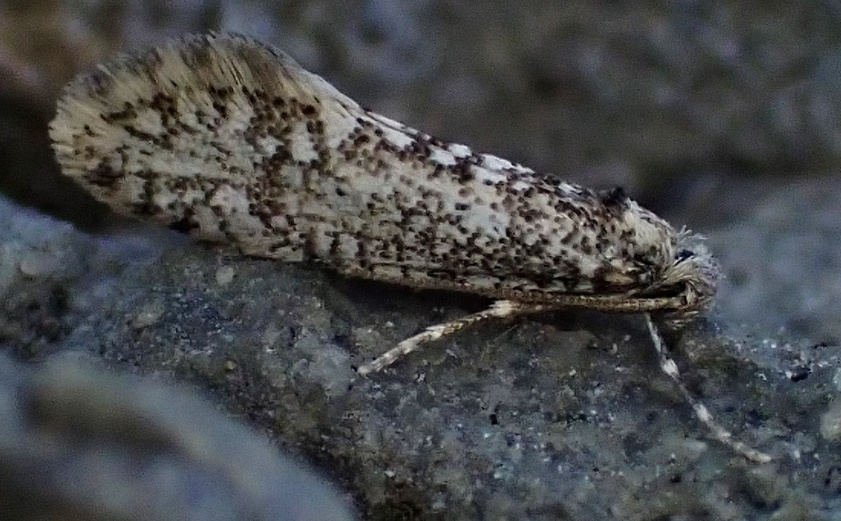
- Scoriodyta rakautarensis seen at Paparoa Point, Kaikōura District, New Zealand

Scientific classification
- Domain: Eukaryota
- Kingdom: Animalia
- Phylum: Arthropoda
- Class: Insecta
- Order: Lepidoptera
- Family: Psychidae
- Genus: Scoriodyta
- Species: S. rakautarensis

Binomial name
- Scoriodyta rakautarensis Hättenschwiler, 1989

= Scoriodyta rakautarensis =

Species of moth

Scoriodyta rakautarensis is a moth of the Psychidae family. It was described by Haettenschwiler in 1989. It is endemic to New Zealand.
