= Scoriodyta patricki =

- Larva.

Scientific classification
- Kingdom: Animalia
- Phylum: Arthropoda
- Clade: Pancrustacea
- Class: Insecta
- Order: Lepidoptera
- Family: Psychidae
- Genus: Scoriodyta
- Species: S. patricki

Binomial name
- Scoriodyta patricki Hättenschwiler, 1989

Species of moth

Scoriodyta patricki is a moth of the Psychidae family. It was first described by Peter Hättenschwiler in 1989. It is endemic to New Zealand.
