= Typhonia leucosceptra =

Scientific classification
- Kingdom: Animalia
- Phylum: Arthropoda
- Class: Insecta
- Order: Lepidoptera
- Family: Psychidae
- Genus: Typhonia
- Species: T. leucosceptra

Binomial name
- Typhonia leucosceptra (Meyrick, 1907)

Synonyms
- Melasina leucosceptra Meyrick, 1905

Species of moth

Typhonia leucosceptra is a moth of the family Psychidae first described by Edward Meyrick in 1907. It is found in Sri Lanka.
