= Conoeca =

Scientific classification
- Domain: Eukaryota
- Kingdom: Animalia
- Phylum: Arthropoda
- Class: Insecta
- Order: Lepidoptera
- Family: Psychidae
- Subfamily: Naryciinae
- Genus: Conoeca; Scott, 1864

Genus of moths

Conoeca is a genus of moths in the family Psychidae.

== Species ==
- Conoeca guildingi Scott, 1864 (Australia)
- Conoeca psammogona (Meyrick, 1931) (Madagascar)

== Unplaced taxa ==
- Conoeca charitoides (Meyrick, 1893) (Australia)
- Conoeca sticktoptera (Lower, 1920) (Australia)
