= Scoriodyta suttonensis =

Scientific classification
- Domain: Eukaryota
- Kingdom: Animalia
- Phylum: Arthropoda
- Class: Insecta
- Order: Lepidoptera
- Family: Psychidae
- Genus: Scoriodyta
- Species: S. suttonensis

Binomial name
- Scoriodyta suttonensis Hättenschwiler, 1989

Species of moth

Scoriodyta suttonensis is a moth of the Psychidae family. It was described by Haettenschwiler in 1989. It is endemic to New Zealand. Specimens have been collected in central Otago.
