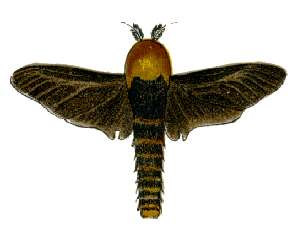

Scientific classification
- Kingdom: Animalia
- Phylum: Arthropoda
- Clade: Pancrustacea
- Class: Insecta
- Order: Lepidoptera
- Family: Psychidae
- Genus: Metura
- Species: M. elongatus

Binomial name
- Metura elongatus (Saunders, 1847)

Synonyms
- Oiketicus elongatus Saunders, 1847; Oiketicus saundersii Westwood, 1855; Phragmatoecia capucina Wallengren, 1860; Oiketicus saundersi Dalla Torre & Strand, 1929

= Metura elongatus =

Species of moth

Saunders' case moth or the large bagworm (Metura elongatus) is a moth of the Psychidae family. It is known from the eastern half of Australia, including Tasmania.

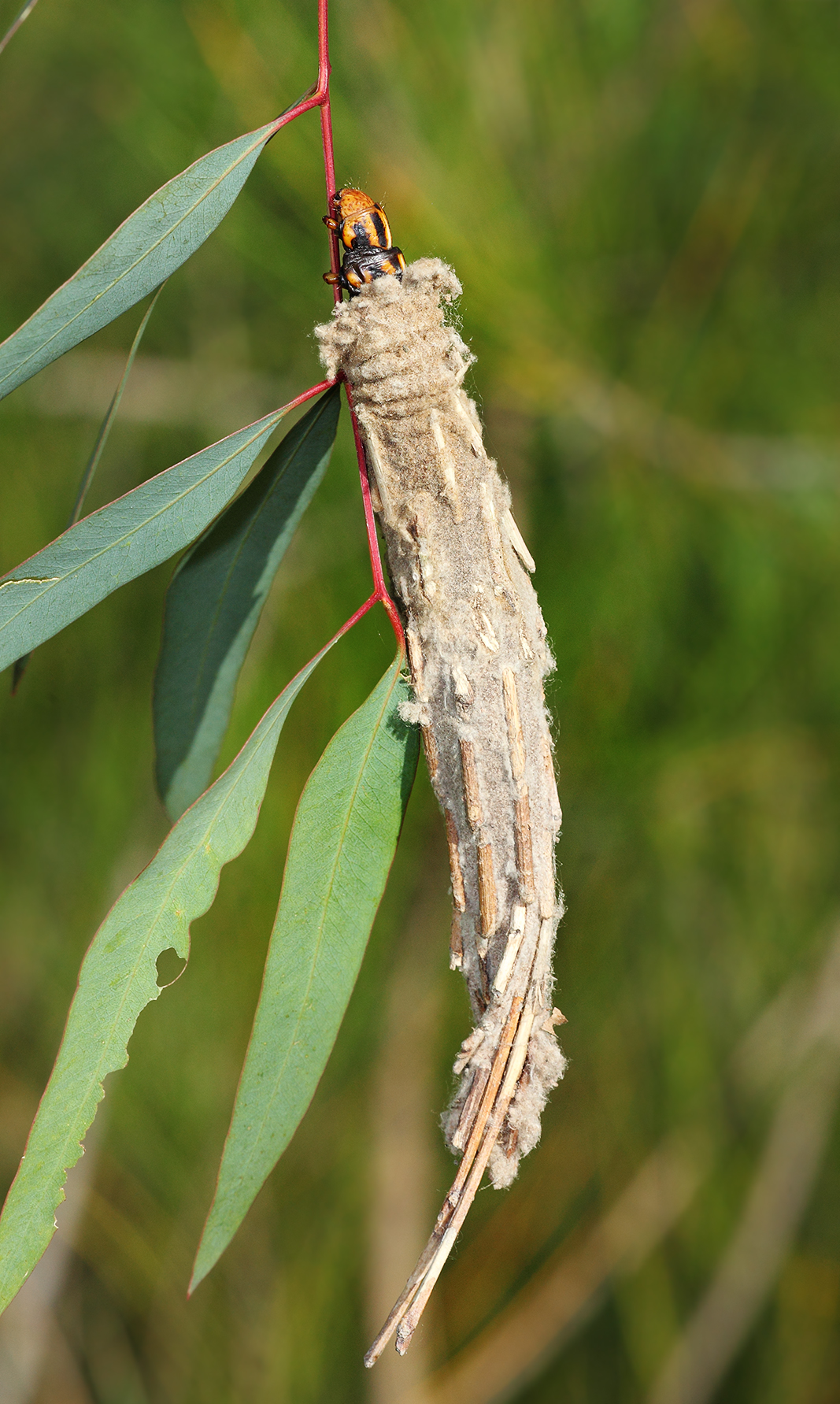
Larva extending from case for locomotion

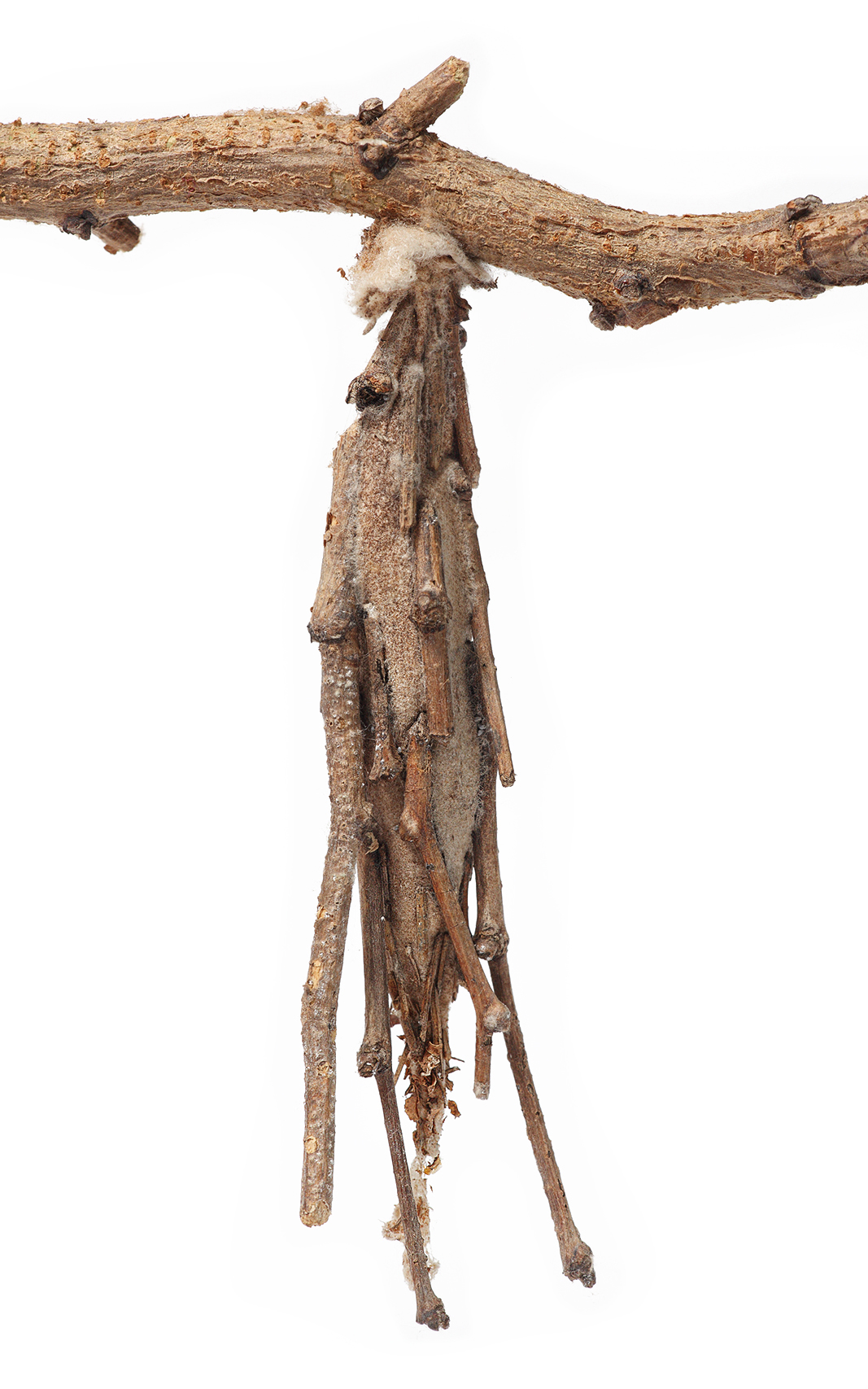
Case

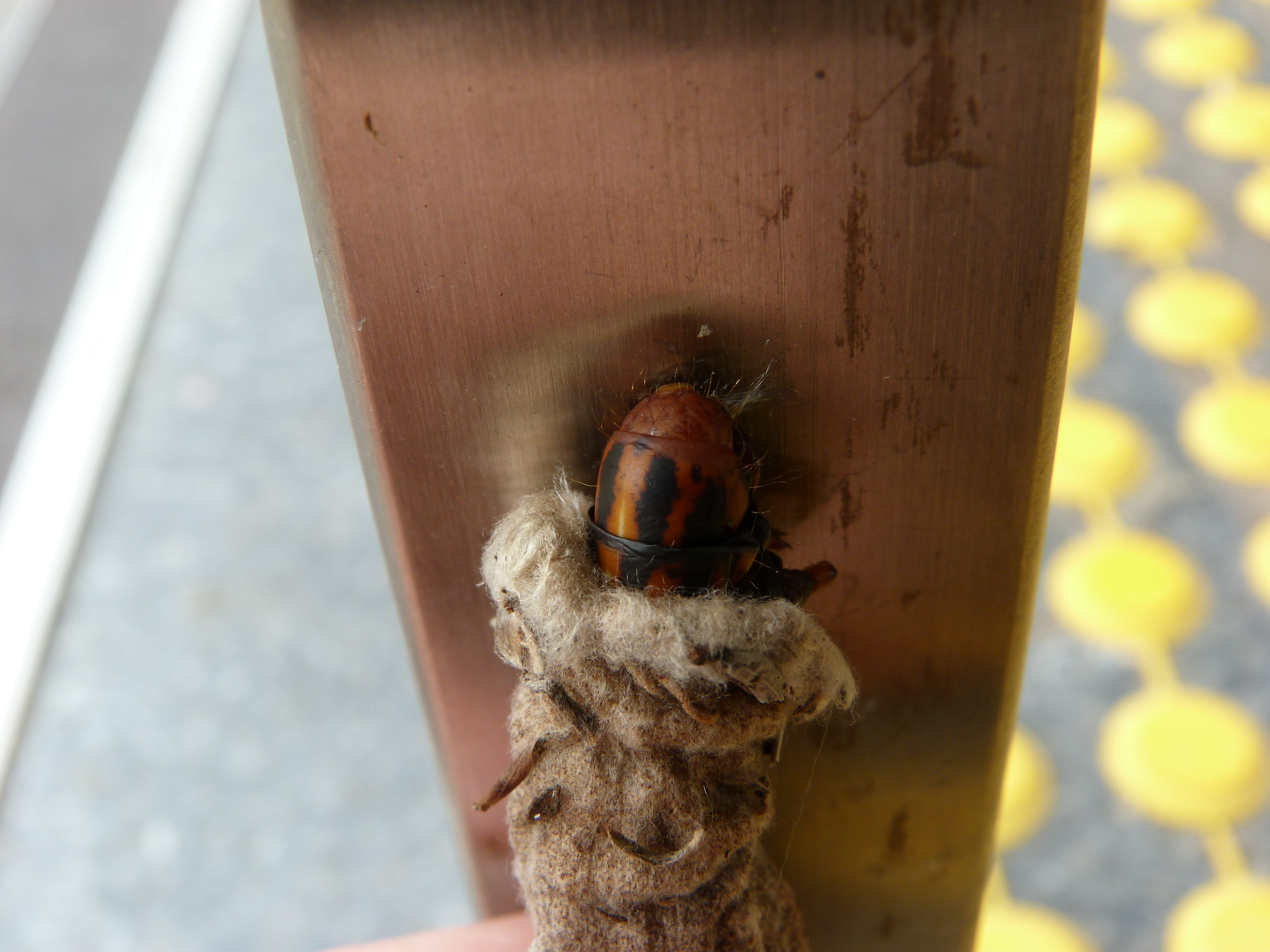
Larva in case
