= Typhonia animosa =

Scientific classification
- Domain: Eukaryota
- Kingdom: Animalia
- Phylum: Arthropoda
- Class: Insecta
- Order: Lepidoptera
- Family: Psychidae
- Genus: Typhonia
- Species: T. animosa

Binomial name
- Typhonia animosa (Meyrick, 1913)

Synonyms
- Melasina animosa Meyrick, 1913

Species of moth

Typhonia animosa is a species of bagworm moth first described by Edward Meyrick in 1913. It is found in South Africa.

The wingspan is about 22 mm. The forewings are white, the posterior half of the costa tinged with ochreous yellowish and the costal edge blackish towards the base. The stigmata is moderately large, black and with the plical slightly beyond the first discal. There is a black dot in the middle of the disc between the stigmata, and about twenty small irregularly scattered black dots towards the margins. The hindwings are whitish ochreous.
