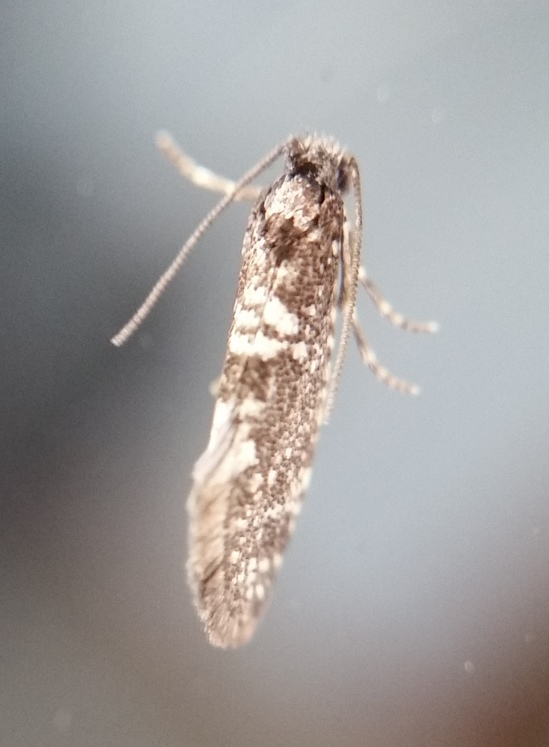

Scientific classification
- Domain: Eukaryota
- Kingdom: Animalia
- Phylum: Arthropoda
- Class: Insecta
- Order: Lepidoptera
- Family: Psychidae
- Genus: Scoriodyta
- Species: S. conisalia

Binomial name
- Scoriodyta conisalia Meyrick, 1888

= Scoriodyta conisalia =

Species of moth

Scoriodyta conisalia is a species of moth in the family Psychidae. It was described by Edward Meyrick in 1888. It is endemic to New Zealand and can be found in the North Island. It has been observed at Karikari, Paihia, in the Poor Knights Islands, and in the Auckland and Wellington regions. The species inhabits native forest and coastal areas where it can be found on rocky outcrops and cliffs. Larvae consume algae and lichens. The adults are on the wing from September to March and are active before sunrise.

== Taxonomy ==
This species was first described by Edward Meyrick in 1888 using specimens collected in Wellington in January. In 1927 Alfred Philpott studied the male genitalia of this species. Hudson discussed this species and illustrated the male in his 1928 book The butterflies and moths of New Zealand. In 1989 this species was discussed in detail and illustrated. The male lectotype is held at the Natural History Museum, London.

== Description ==
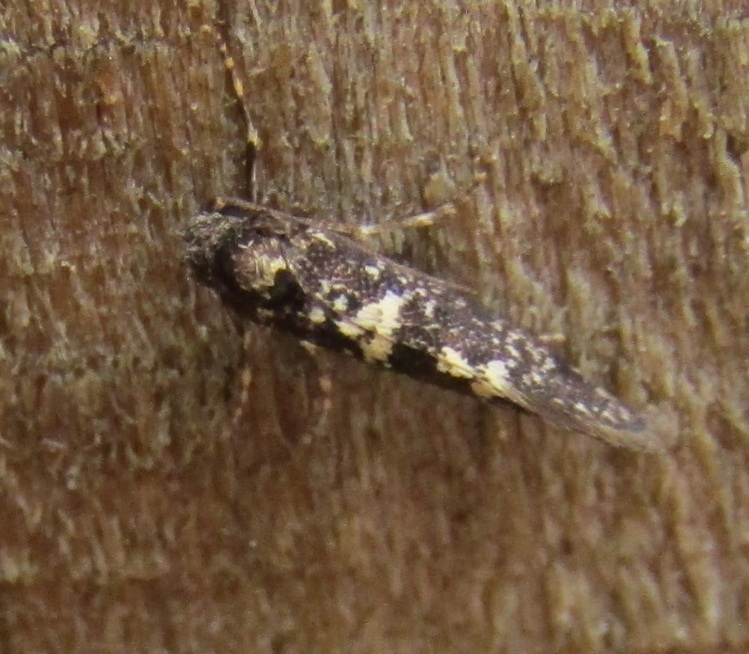
Living specimen.

The larva of S. conisalia is coloured dark brown.

Meyrick described the adult male of this species as follows:

Male. — 10 mm. Head, palpi, antennae, thorax, and abdomen fuscous. Legs dark fuscous, apex of joints ochreous-whitish, posterior tibiae ochreous-whitish. Forewings elongate, costa gently arched, apex rounded, hindmargin very obliquely rounded; fuscous, irrorated with blackish; some scattered white scales, tending to form irregular transverse strigulae; the absence of these appears to form darker median and subterminal fasciae; a distinct white double spot on inner margin before middle, and a very small one before anal angle; a hindmarginal row of cloudy white dots : cilia fuscous, mixed with grey- whitish, with a cloudy dark fuscous line near base. Hindwings fuscous-grey; cilia whitish-grey, with a fuscous basal line.

The female is apterous.

This species is a case moth with the case being spindle shaped. It was also described by P. Hättenschwiler as follows:

Flat, with distinct lateral margin, surface irregularly decorated with sand and lichen; before pupation case is coated with loose silk web. Dimensions:6.0-8.5 mml ong, 2-3 mm wide(♂♂); 7-12 mm long, 2.0-3.2 mm wide (♀♀)

== Distribution ==
S. conisalia is endemic to New Zealand. This species has been observed only in the North Island at Karikari, Paihia, in the Poor Knights Islands, and in the Auckland and Wellington regions.

== Habitat and hosts ==
This species inhabits native forest as well as coastal areas preferring rocky outcrops and cliffs, often at locations exposed to sea spray. Larvae consume algae and lichens. Hudson stated that one of the larval host species is Pleurococcus vulgaris. The larval cases can be found on fences and tree trunks.

== Behaviour ==
Larvae pupate in September with adult males being on the wing from September to March. The female, once she has emerged, stands motionless on the larval case awaiting the winged male. Adult males have been successfully collected before sunrise on damp days.

Life stages
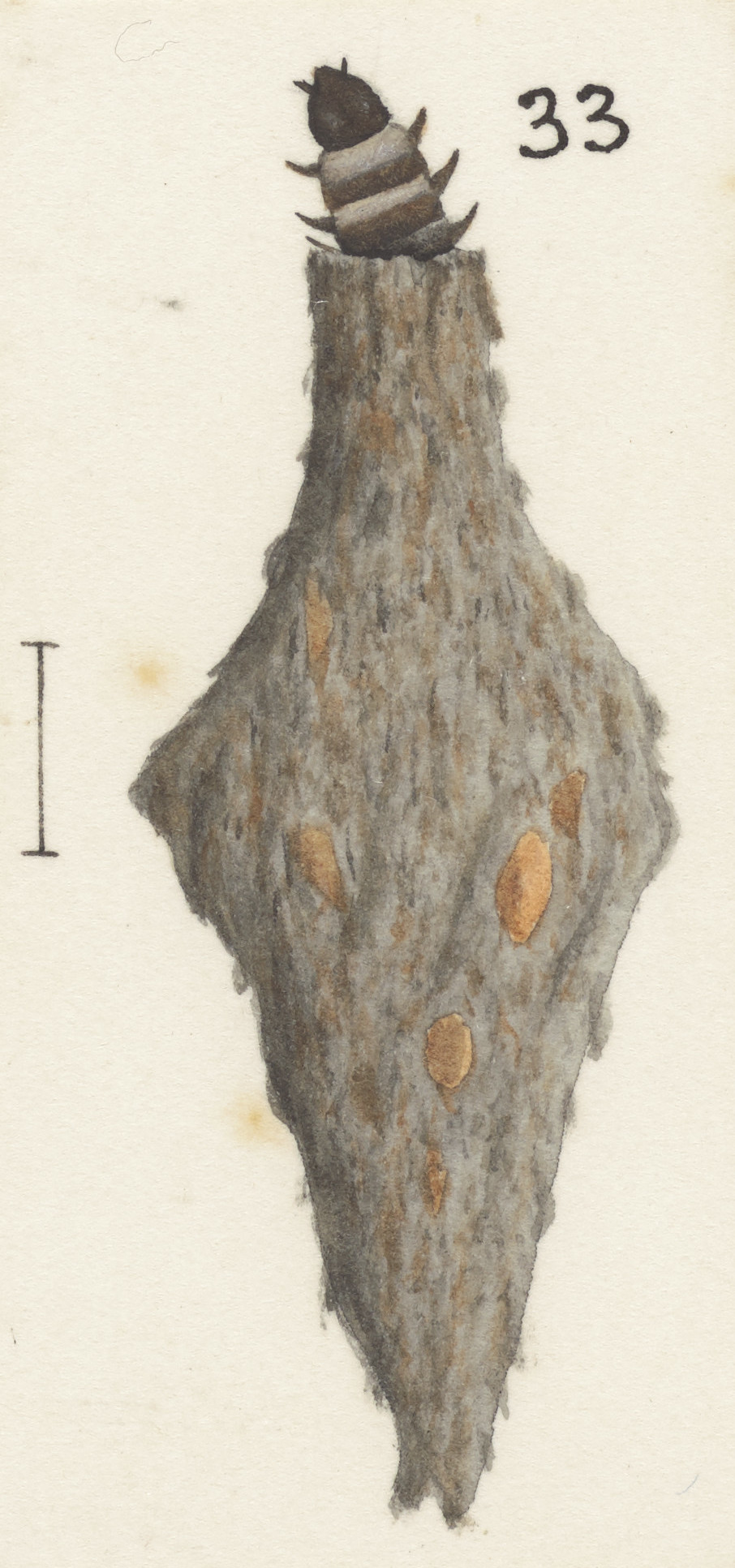
Larva in case.

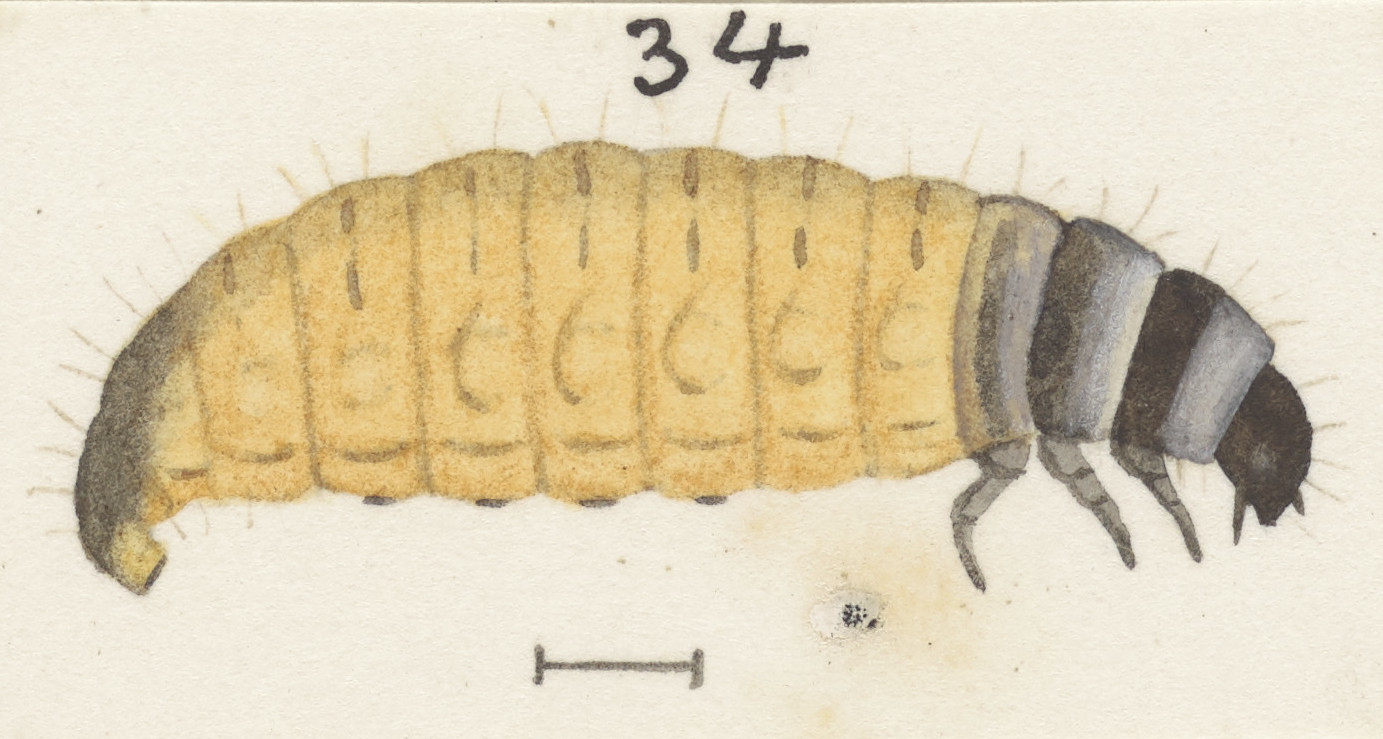
Larva withdrawn from case.

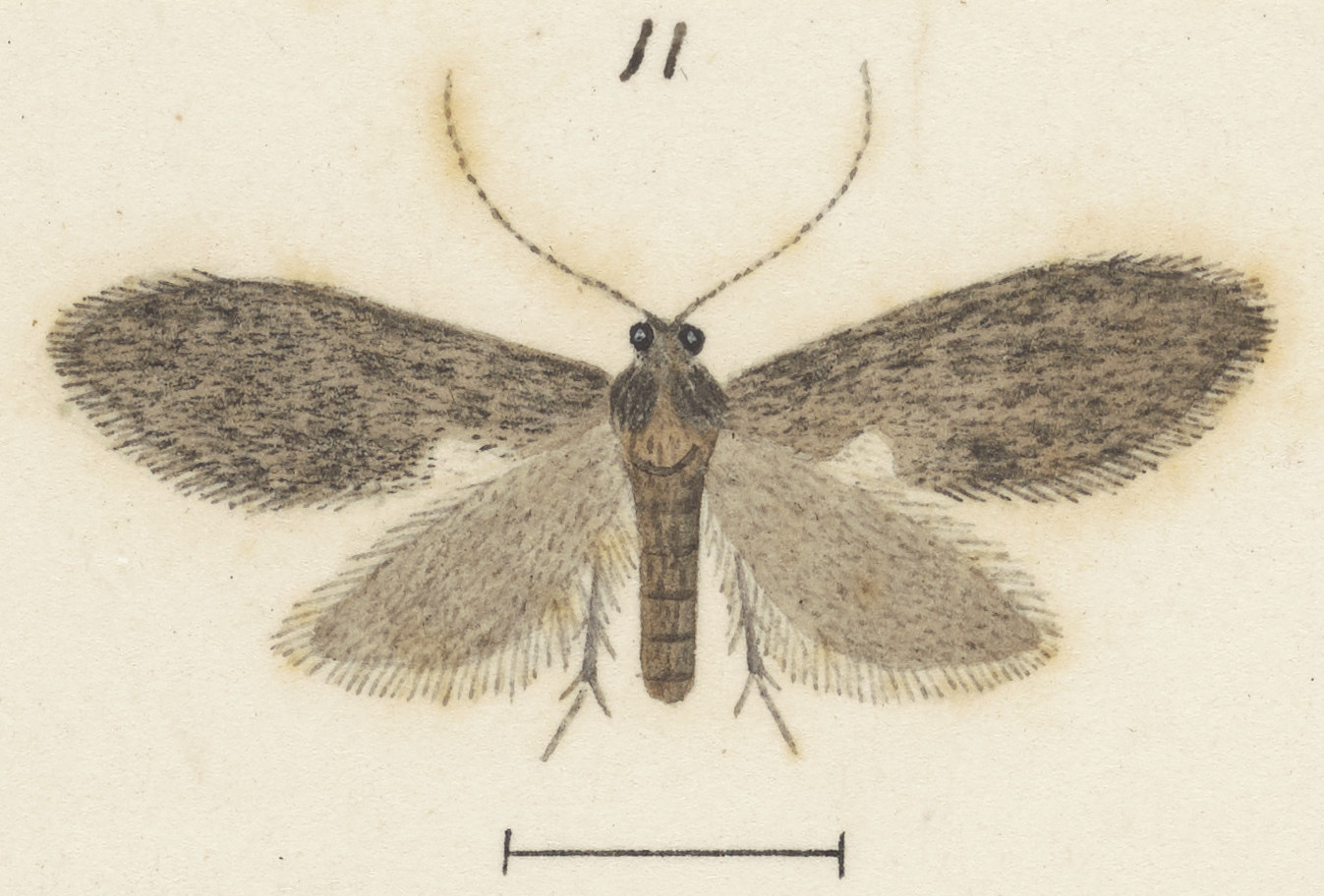
Illustration of male.

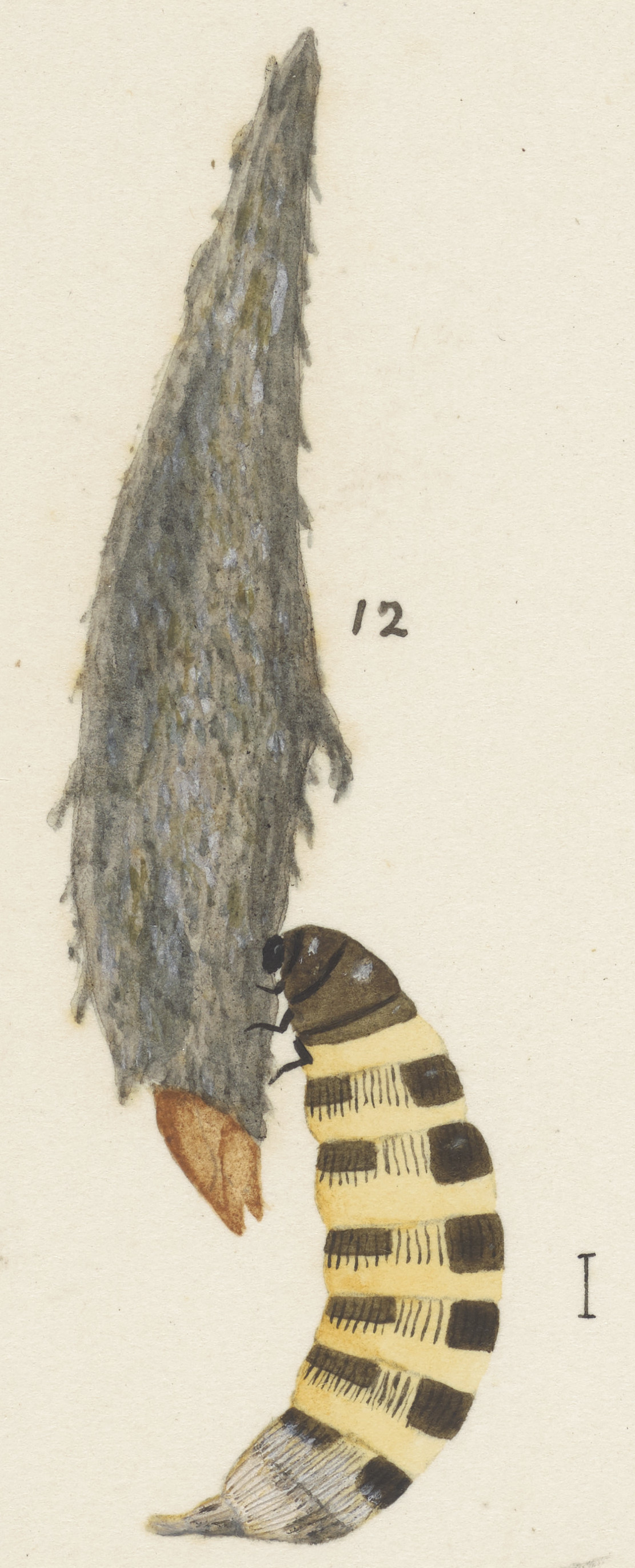
Illustration of female on case
