= Stichobasis postmeridianus =

Scientific classification
- Kingdom: Animalia
- Phylum: Arthropoda
- Clade: Pancrustacea
- Class: Insecta
- Order: Lepidoptera
- Family: Psychidae
- Genus: Stichobasis
- Species: S. postmeridianus

Binomial name
- Stichobasis postmeridianus Zerafa & Sammut, 2009

Species of moth

Stichobasis postmeridianus is a species of moth of the Psychidae family that was discovered in 2010 in the Maltese Islands. The species is featured in the journal of the Entomological Society of Malta.
