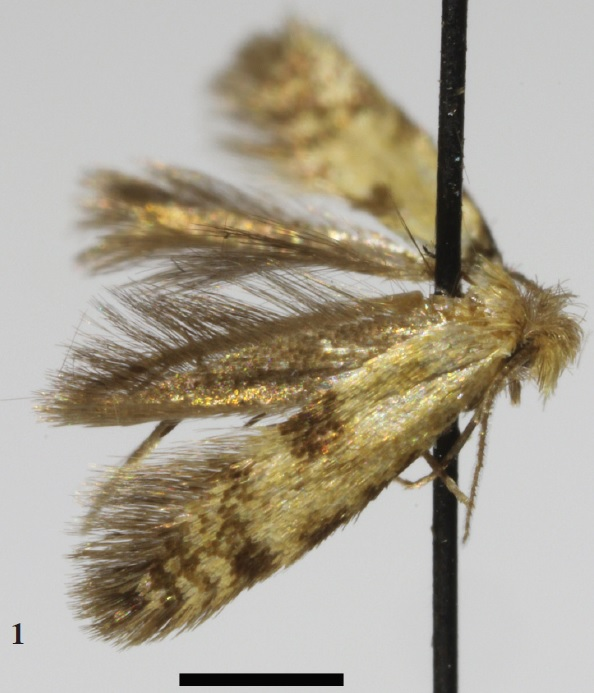

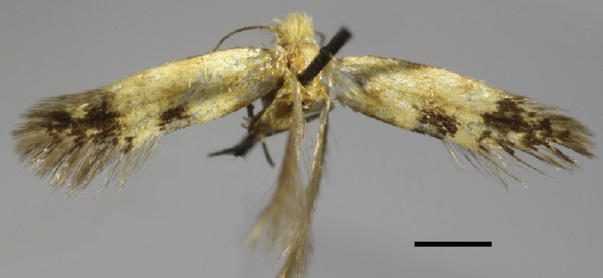

Scientific classification
- Domain: Eukaryota
- Kingdom: Animalia
- Phylum: Arthropoda
- Class: Insecta
- Order: Lepidoptera
- Family: Psychidae
- Genus: Eumasia
- Species: E. crisostomella

Binomial name
- Eumasia crisostomella (Amsel, 1957)

Synonyms
- Pygmaeotinea crisostomella Amsel, 1957

= Eumasia crisostomella =

Species of moth

Eumasia crisostomella is a moth in the Psychidae family. It is found in Portugal.

The wingspan is 7–8 mm. The forewing ground colour is yellowish, with a distinct dark brown spot at one-half of the posterior margin and partly the anterior margin with some very narrow dark brown spots. The distal third is significantly spotted and converges partially to transverse lines. The hindwings are uniform dark grey.
