= Eumasia =

Scientific classification
- Kingdom: Animalia
- Phylum: Arthropoda
- Clade: Pancrustacea
- Class: Insecta
- Order: Lepidoptera
- Family: Psychidae
- Subfamily: Oiketicinae
- Genus: Eumasia; Chrétien, 1904

Type species
- Coleophora parietariella Heydenreich, 1851

Synonyms
- Kruegeria Müller-Rutz, 1920 (non Schmidt, 1911: preoccupied); Krügeria (lapsus); Pygmaeotinea Amsel, 1957

Genus of moths

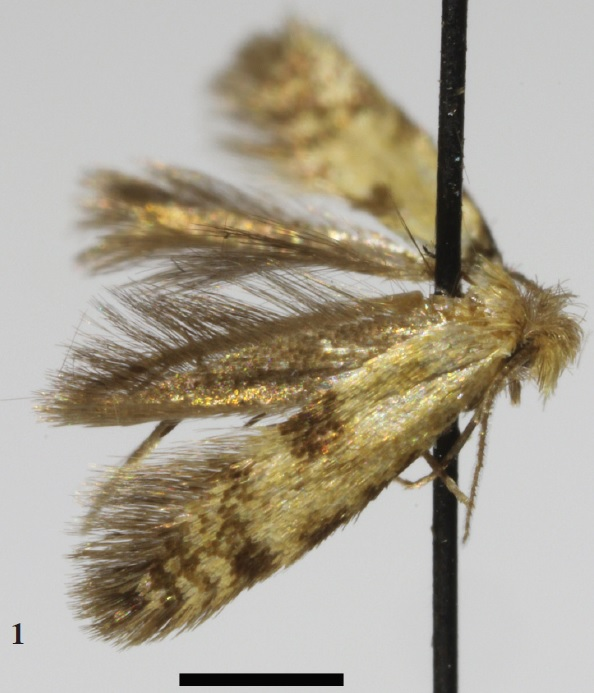
Eumasia crisostomella specimenf

Eumasia is a small genus of the bagworm moth family, Psychidae. Therein, it belongs to the tribe Apteronini of the subfamily Oiketicinae.

== Species ==
Species of Eumasia include:

- Eumasia brunella Hattenschwiler 1996
- Eumasia crisostomella (Amsel, 1957)
- Eumasia muscella Saigusa & Sugimoto, 2005
- Eumasia parietariella (Heydenreich, 1851)
- Eumasia viridilichenella Saigusa & Sugimoto, 2005
