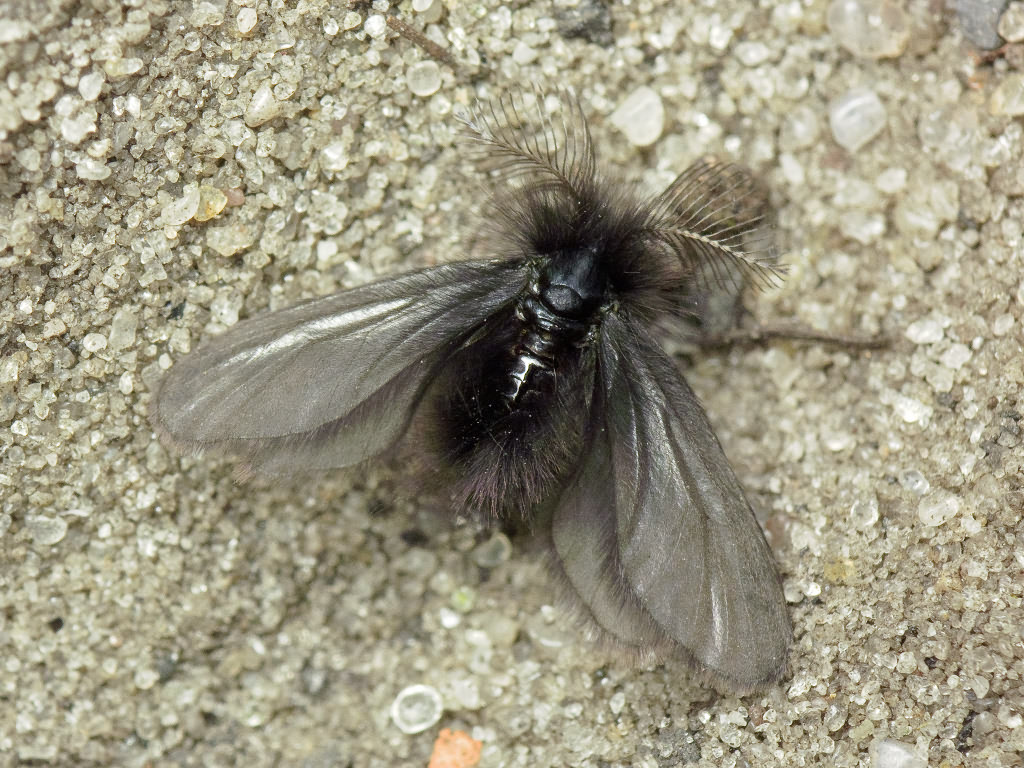

Scientific classification
- Kingdom: Animalia
- Phylum: Arthropoda
- Clade: Pancrustacea
- Class: Insecta
- Order: Lepidoptera
- Family: Psychidae
- Genus: Ptilocephala
- Species: P. plumifera

Binomial name
- Ptilocephala plumifera (Ochsenheimer, 1810)

Synonyms
- Psyche plumifera Ochsenheimer, 1810

= Ptilocephala plumifera =

Species of moth

Ptilocephala plumifera is a moth of the family Psychidae. It is found in most of Europe south of the British Isles and Scandinavia, east to the European part of Russia.

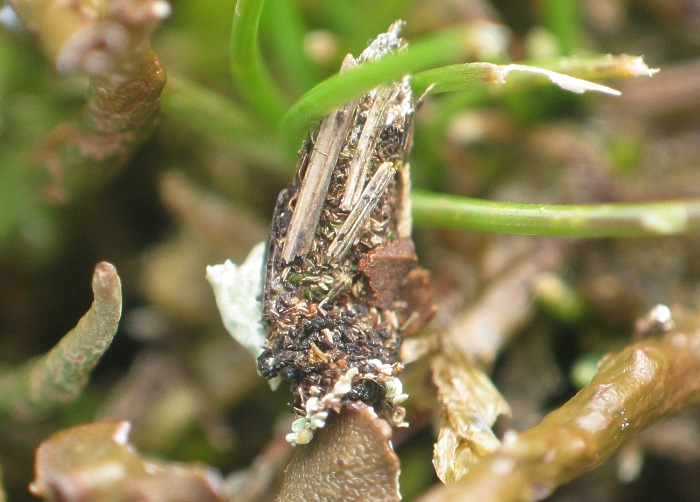
Bag

There is strong sexual dimorphism in the adults. Males have wings, but females are wingless. Adults are on wing from March to April.

The larvae feed on various grasses and herbs, including Thymus and Calluna and possibly mosses.
