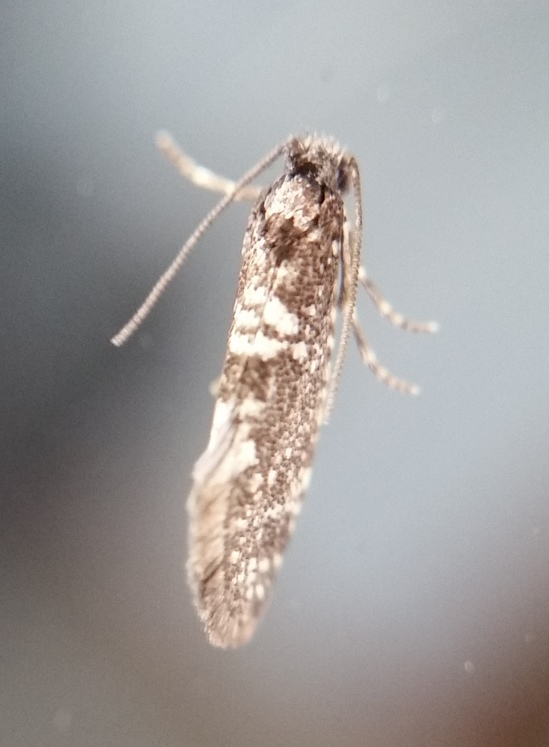
- Type species Scoriodyta conisalia.

Scientific classification
- Domain: Eukaryota
- Kingdom: Animalia
- Phylum: Arthropoda
- Class: Insecta
- Order: Lepidoptera
- Family: Psychidae
- Genus: Scoriodyta; Edward Meyrick, 1888

= Scoriodyta =

Genus of moths

Scoriodyta is a genus of moths of the family Psychidae. It was first described by Edward Meyrick in 1888.

== Species ==
Species contained in this genus are as follows:

- Scoriodyta conisalia Meyrick, 1888
- Scoriodyta dugdalei Hättenschwiler, 1989
- Scoriodyta patricki Hättenschwiler, 1989
- Scoriodyta rakautarensis Hättenschwiler, 1989
- Scoriodyta sereinae Hättenschwiler, 1989
- Scoriodyta suttonensis Hättenschwiler, 1989
- Scoriodyta virginella Hättenschwiler, 1989
