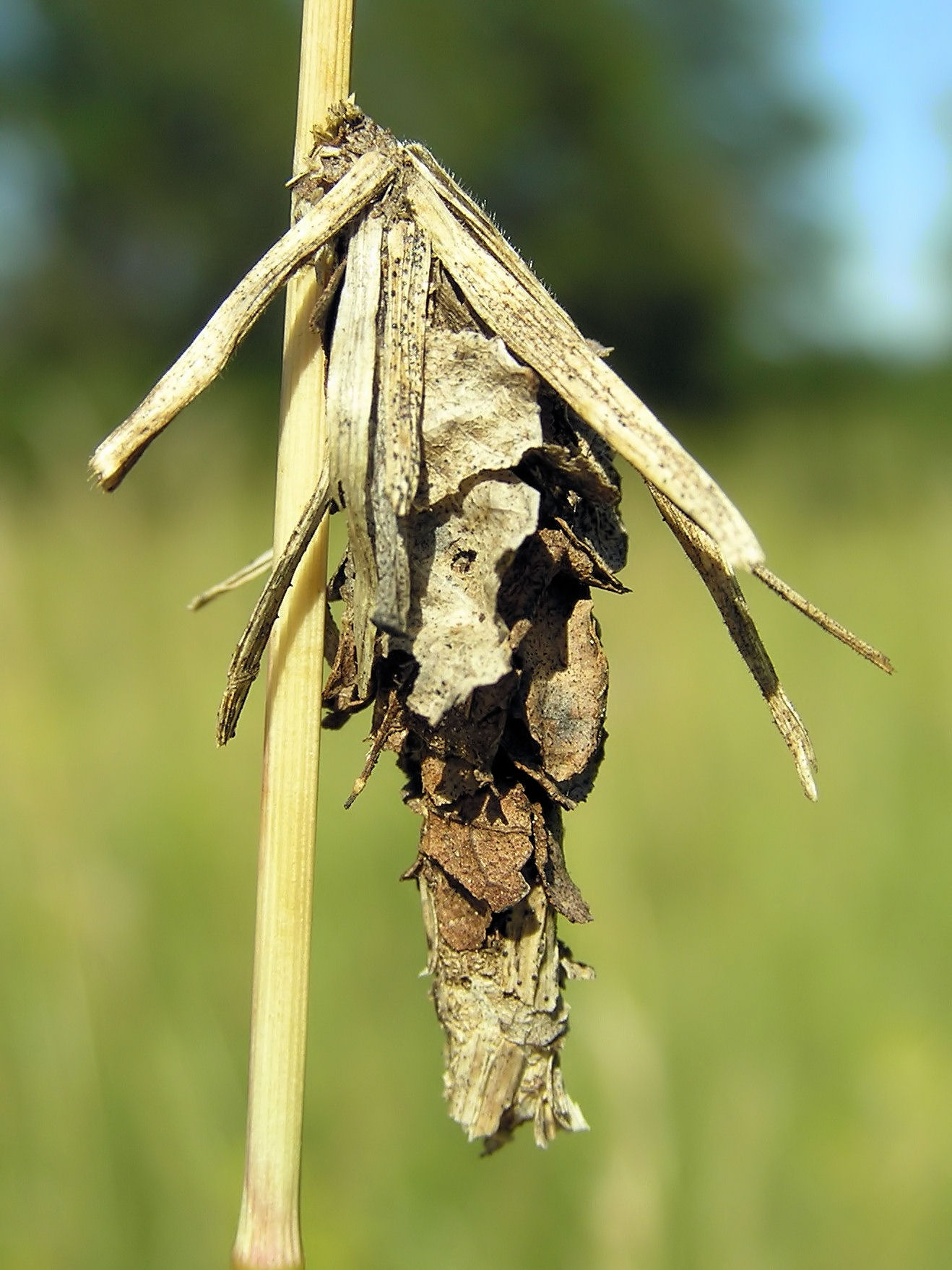
- Caterpillar bag

Scientific classification
- Kingdom: Animalia
- Phylum: Arthropoda
- Class: Insecta
- Order: Lepidoptera
- Family: Psychidae
- Genus: Canephora
- Species: C. hirsuta

Binomial name
- Canephora hirsuta Poda, 1761

Synonyms
- List: Phalaena unicolor Hufnagel, 1766; Canephora unicolor (Hufnagel, 1766); Lepidopsyche unicolor (Hufnagel, 1766); Psyche unicolor (Hufnagel, 1766); Pachytelia unicolor; Pachythelia unicolor

= Canephora hirsuta =

Species of moth

Canephora hirsuta, commonly known as the hairy sweep, is a species of moth in the family Psychidae. It is found in Europe.

The wingspan of the male is 20–25 mm, and the female is wingless. The moth flies in one generation from May to July.

The larvae feed on shrubs, deciduous trees and herbaceous plants.

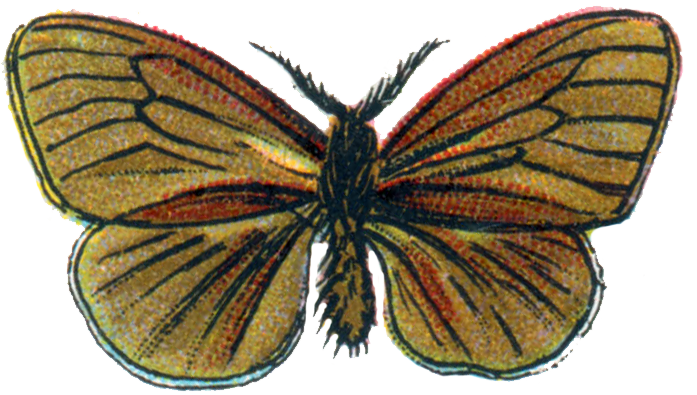
Illustrated adult

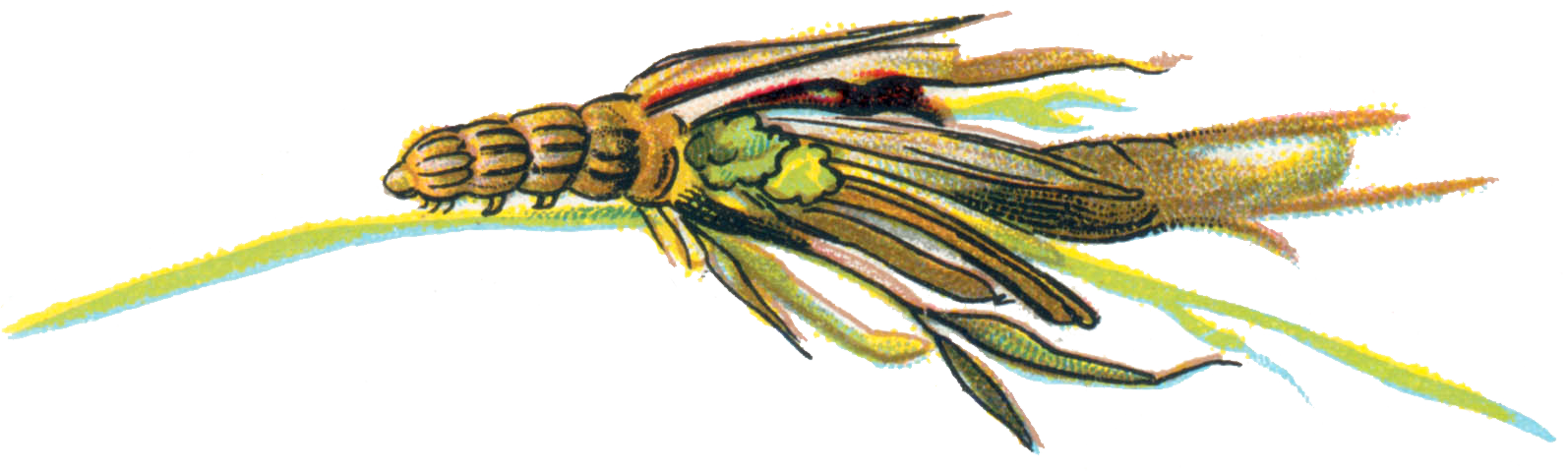
Illustrated caterpillar

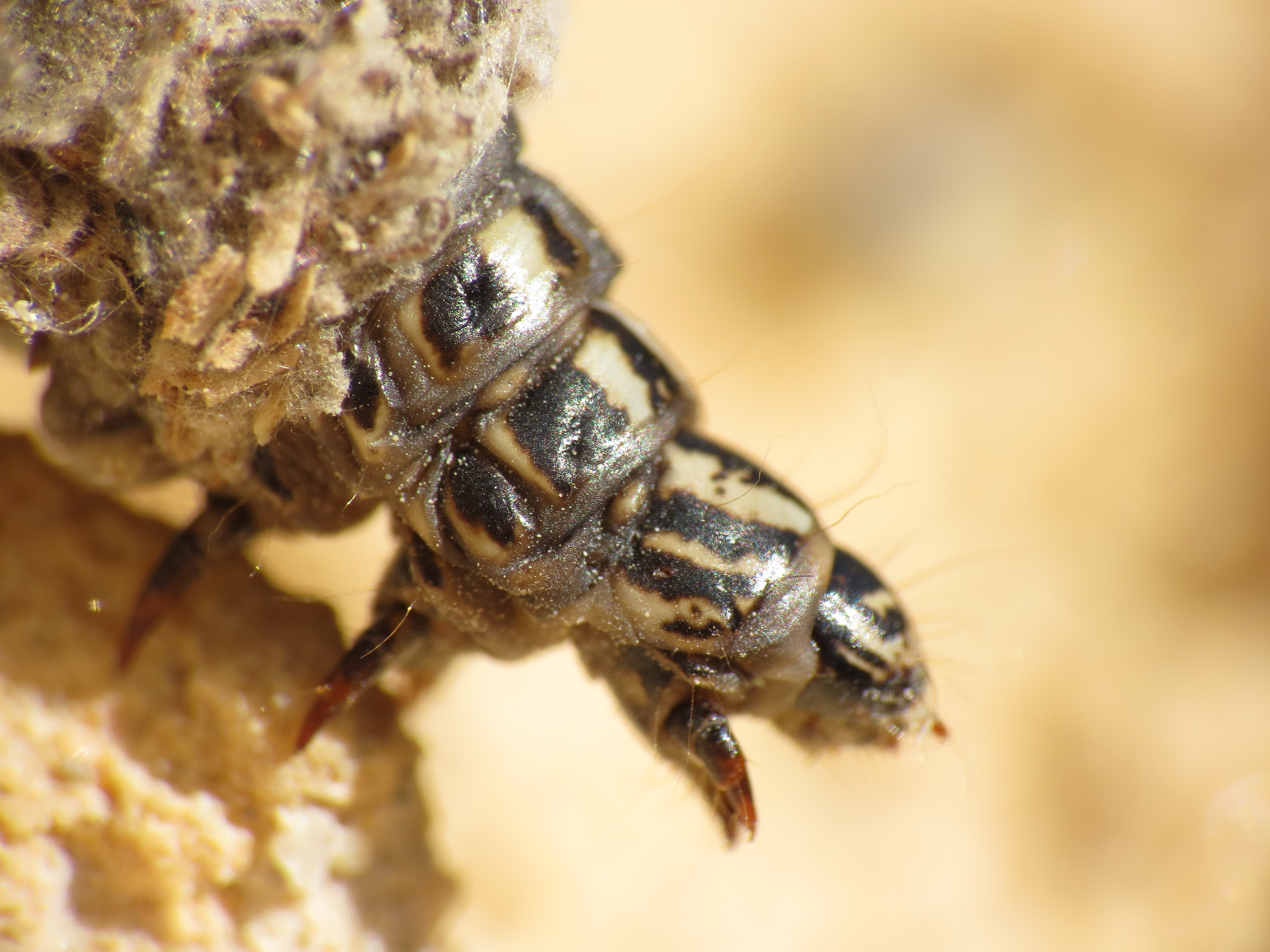
Larva

== Notes ==
1. The flight season refers to Belgium and The Netherlands. This may vary in other parts of the range.
