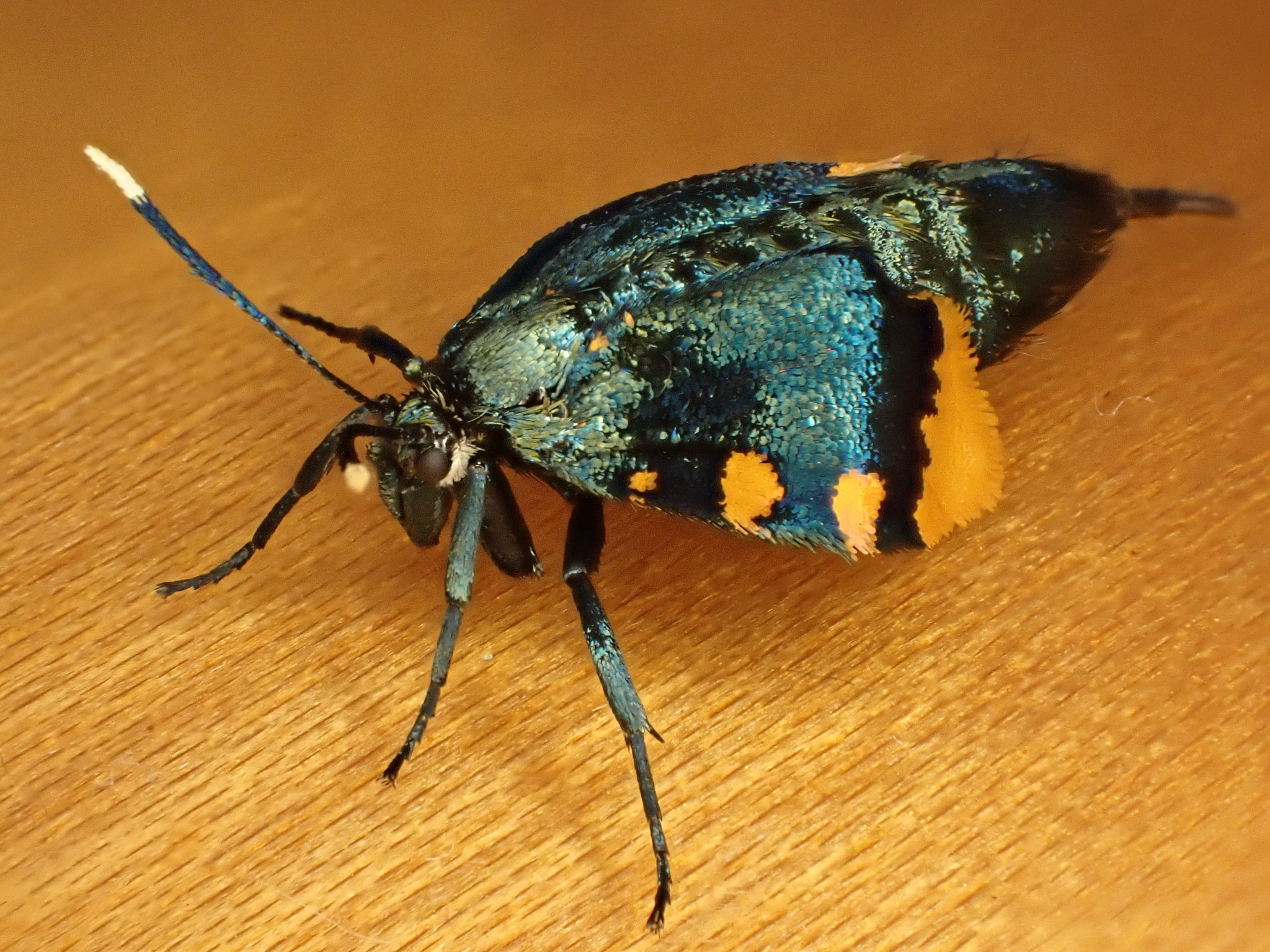
- Female
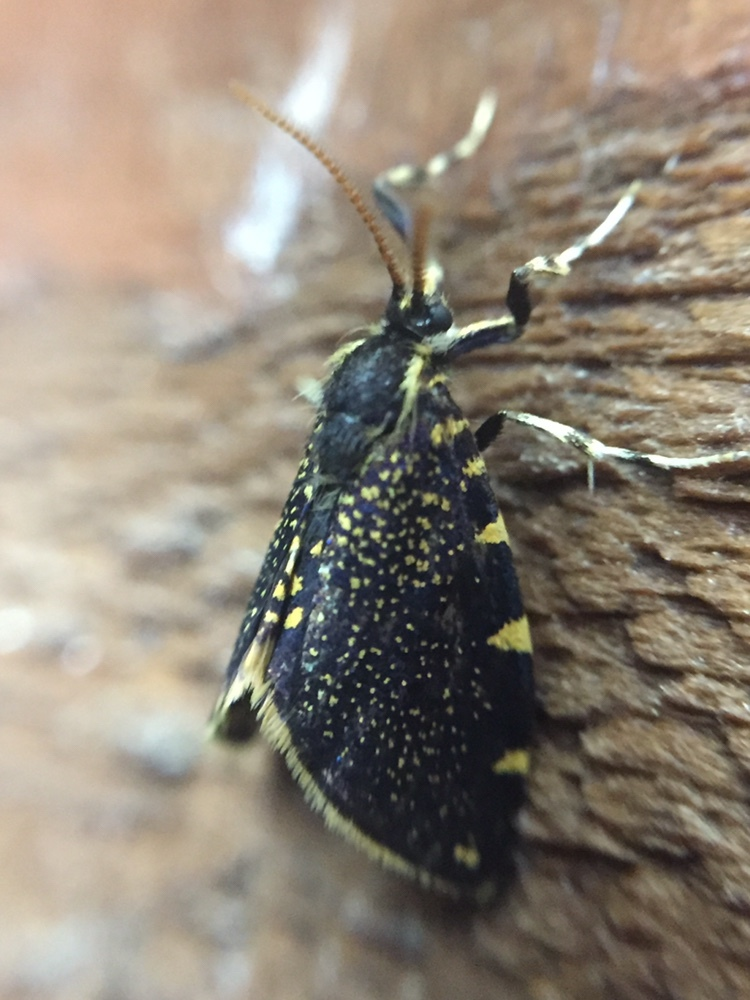
- Male

Scientific classification
- Kingdom: Animalia
- Phylum: Arthropoda
- Clade: Pancrustacea
- Class: Insecta
- Order: Lepidoptera
- Family: Psychidae
- Subfamily: Taleporiinae
- Genus: Cebysa; Walker, 1854
- Species: C. leucotelus

Binomial name
- Cebysa leucotelus Walker, 1854

Synonyms
- Pitane dilecta Walker, 1854; Sezeris conflictella Walker, 1863; Oecinea scotti Scott, 1864; Cebysa leucoteles Meyrick, 1912

= Cebysa =

Species of moth

Cebysa leucotelus, the Australian bagmoth or lichen bag moth, is a moth of the Psychidae family. It is the only species in the genus Cebysa. It is found in New Zealand and the southern half of Australia (Tasmania, Victoria and Western Australia).

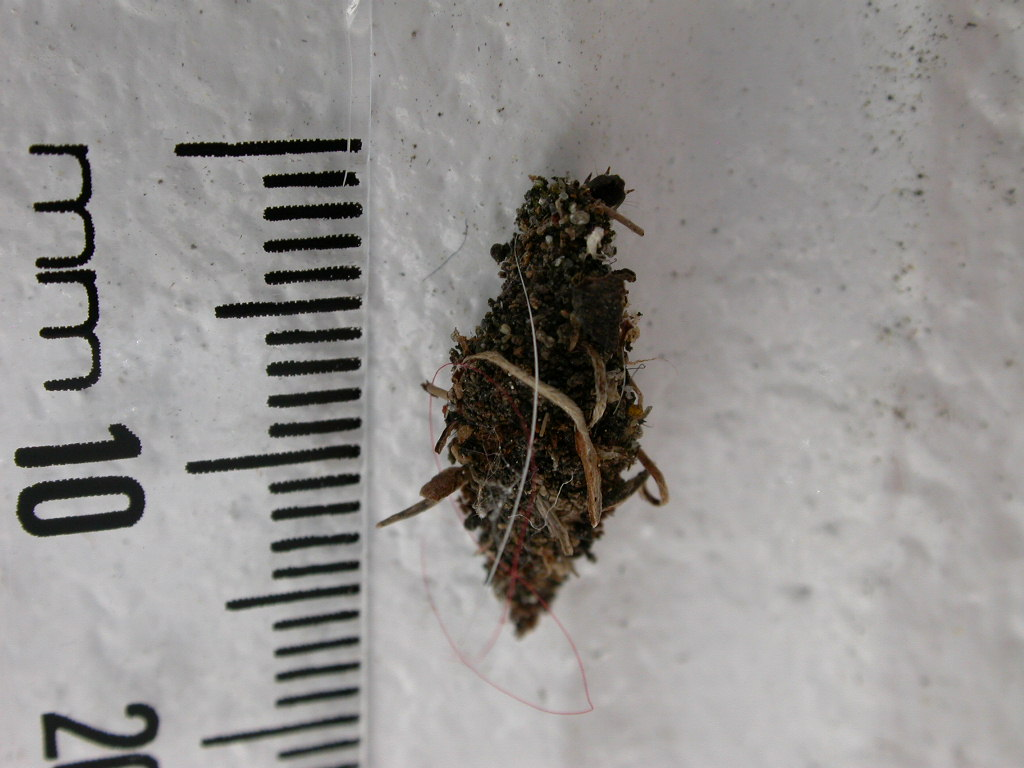
Larva in case

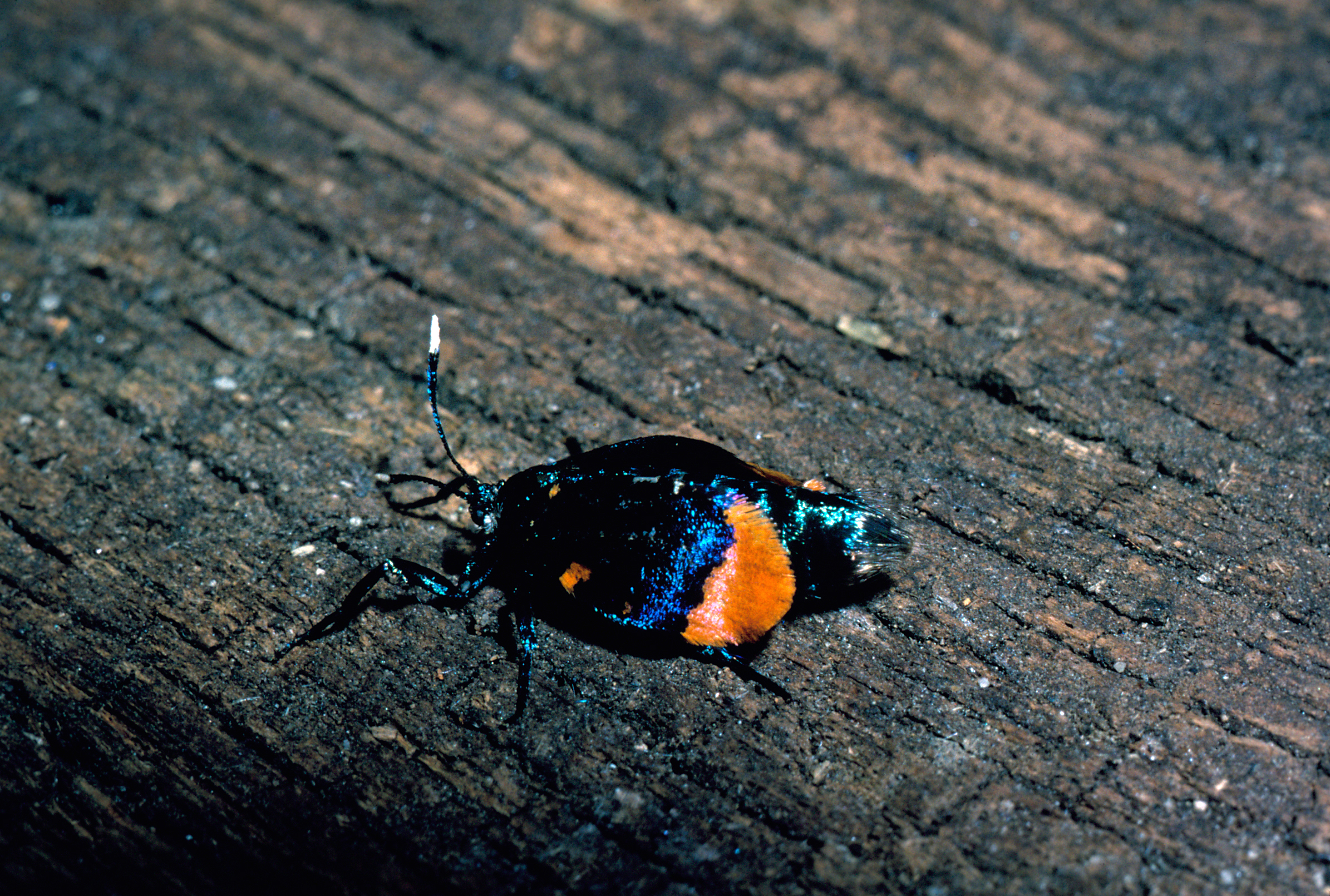
Female lichen bag moth, with underdeveloped wings.

The larvae build a protective bag like the other bag moths in the family Psychidae, and feed on lichen and algae.

Lichen bag moths arrived in New Zealand from Australia in 1981 and have been gradually spreading across the country.
