= Typhonia bimaculata =

Scientific classification
- Kingdom: Animalia
- Phylum: Arthropoda
- Class: Insecta
- Order: Lepidoptera
- Family: Psychidae
- Genus: Typhonia
- Species: T. bimaculata

Binomial name
- Typhonia bimaculata Sobczyk & Schütte, 2010

Species of moth

Typhonia bimaculata is a species of bagworm moth native to Madagascar.

The female has a wingspan of 33 mm, length of the forewings: 16 mm.

Forewings have nine veins, of light brown with a large dark spot in the middle. Hindwings are darker than the forewings and of shining brown grey.

== See also ==
- List of moths of Madagascar
