= Cryptothelea =

Scientific classification
- Kingdom: Animalia
- Phylum: Arthropoda
- Class: Insecta
- Order: Lepidoptera
- Family: Psychidae
- Subfamily: Oiketicinae
- Genus: Cryptothelea; Duncan & Westwood, 1841

Genus of moths

Cryptothelea is a genus of moths belonging to the family Psychidae.

The species of this genus are found in Australia and Northern America.

Species:

- Cryptothelea acacienta Arora & Dolla, 1965
- Cryptothelea albifrons Wallengren, 1860
- Cryptothelea cardiophora West, 1932
