= Phalacropterix =

Scientific classification
- Kingdom: Animalia
- Phylum: Arthropoda
- Clade: Pancrustacea
- Class: Insecta
- Order: Lepidoptera
- Family: Psychidae
- Genus: Phalacropterix; Hübner, 1825

Genus of butterflies

Phalacropterix is a genus of moths belonging to the family Psychidae.

The species of this genus are found in Europe.

Species:

- Phalacropterix apiformis (Rossi, 1790)
- Phalacropterix bruandi Lederer, 1855
