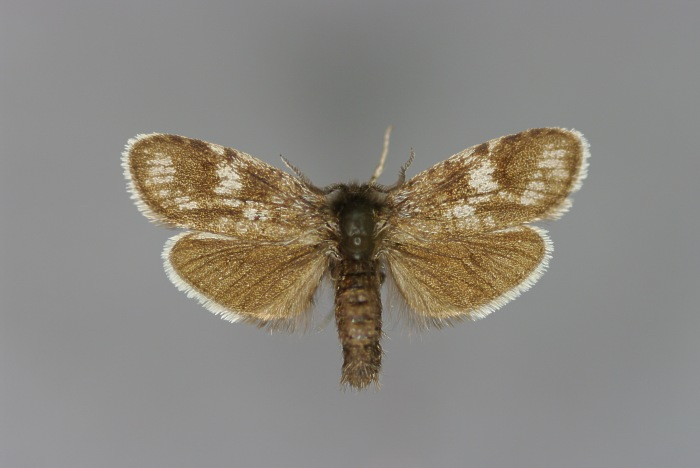
- Typhonia beatricis

Scientific classification
- Kingdom: Animalia
- Phylum: Arthropoda
- Clade: Pancrustacea
- Class: Insecta
- Order: Lepidoptera
- Family: Psychidae
- Genus: Typhonia; Boisduval, 1834

Synonyms
- Coracia Hübner, 1819; Corasia Hübner, 1826; Melasina Boisduval, 1840; Melapsyche Kozhanchikov, 1956

= Typhonia =

Genus of moths

Typhonia is a genus of moths of the Psychidae family.

== Selected species ==
Some species of this genus are:

- Typhonia abacodes (Meyrick, 1908)
- Typhonia alluaudiella (Viette, 1954)
- Typhonia amica (Meyrick, 1908)
- Typhonia anasactis (Meyrick, 1907) (from Sri Lanka)
- Typhonia animosa (Meyrick, 1913)
- Typhonia autopetra (Meyrick, 1907) (from Sri Lanka)
- Typhonia autochthonia (Meyrick, 1931) (from India)
- Typhonia bettoni (Butler, 1898)
- Typhonia bimaculata Sobczyk & Schütte, 2010
- Typhonia brachiata (Meyrick, 1919) (from India)
- Typhonia campestris (Meyrick, 1916) (from India)
- Typhonia certatrix (Meyrick, 1916) (from India)
- Typhonia circophora (Meyrick, 1909)
- Typhonia cnaphalodes (Meyrick, 1917
- Typhonia coagulata (Meyrick, 1919) (from India)
- Typhonia colonica (Meyrick, 1916) (from India)
- Typhonia craterodes (Meyrick, 1917)
- Typhonia cremata (Meyrick, 1916) (from India)
- Typhonia cylindraula (Meyrick, 1920)
- Typhonia decaryella (Viette, 1955) (from Madagascar)
- Typhonia deposita (Meyrick, 1919) (from India)
- Typhonia dissoluta (Meyrick, 1908)
- Typhonia energa (Meyrick, 1905) (from Sri Lanka)
- Typhonia effervescens (Meyrick, 1911)
- Typhonia expressa (Meyrick, 1916) (from Sri Lanka)
- Typhonia exsecrata (Meyrick, 1937) (from India)
- Typhonia fibriculatella (Viette, 1956)
- Typhonia frenigera (Meyrick, 1911) (from Sri Lanka)
- Typhonia granularis (Meyrick, 1916) (from Sri Lanka)
- Typhonia gregaria (Meyrick, 1916) (from India)
- Typhonia gypsopetra (Meyrick, 1937)
- Typhonia halieutis (Meyrick, 1908)
- Typhonia homopercna (Meyrick, 1920)
- Typhonia isopeda (Meyrick, 1907) (from India)
- Typhonia jactata (Meyrick, 1937) (from India)
- Typhonia imparata (Meyrick, 1928) (from India)
- Typhonia indigena (Meyrick, 1917)
- Typhonia infensa (Meyrick, 1916) (from India)
- Typhonia interscissa (Meyrick, 1924)
- Typhonia inveterata (Meyrick, 1915)
- Typhonia leucosceptra (Meyrick, 1907) (from Sri Lanka)
- Typhonia lignosa (Meyrick, 1917) (from India)
- Typhonia nota (Meyrick, 1919) (from India)
- Typhonia linodyta (Meyrick, 1921)
- Typhonia liochra (Meyrick, 1908)
- Typhonia marmarodes (Meyrick, 1920)
- Typhonia meliphaea (Meyrick, 1916) (from India)
- Typhonia metherca (Meyrick, 1916) (from Sri Lanka)
- Typhonia multiplex (Meyrick, 1917) (from India)
- Typhonia mylica (Meyrick, 1908)
- Typhonia nectaritis (Meyrick, 1915)
- Typhonia nigrescens (Meyrick, 1920)
- Typhonia obtrectans (Meyrick, 1930) (from India)
- Typhonia onthostola (Meyrick, 1937)( (from India)
- Typhonia paraphrictis (Meyrick, 1908)
- Typhonia paraclasta (Meyrick, 1922) (from India)
- Typhonia paricropa (Meyrick, 1907) (from India)
- Typhonia pelostrota (Meyrick, 1927)
- Typhonia pericrossa (Meyrick, 1907) (from India)
- Typhonia petrodes (Meyrick, 1914)
- Typhonia phaeogenes (Meyrick, 1919) (from India)
- Typhonia picea (Meyrick, 1917)
- Typhonia praecepta (Meyrick, 1916) (from India)
- Typhonia ptyalistis (Meyrick, 1937) (from India)
- Typhonia ramifera (Meyrick, 1916) (from India)
- Typhonia rhythmopis (Meyrick, 1928) (Andamans)
- Typhonia salicoma (Meyrick, 1918)
- Typhonia semota (Meyrick, 1937) (from India)
- Typhonia seyrigiella (Viette, 1954) (from Madagascar)
- Typhonia stelitis (Meyrick, 1908)
- Typhonia stratifica (Meyrick, 1907) (from Sri Lanka)
- Typhonia stupea (Wallengren, 1875)
- Typhonia subacta (Meyrick, 1919) (from India)
- Typhonia susurrans (Meyrick, 1911)
- Typhonia systolaea (Meyrick, 1908)
- Typhonia talaria (Meyrick, 1924)
- Typhonia tanyphaea (Meyrick, 1924)
- Typhonia tetraspila (Meyrick, 1905) (from Sri Lanka)
- Typhonia tylota (Meyrick, 1916) (from India)
- Typhonia tyrophanes (Meyrick, 1917)
- Typhonia vadonella (Viette, 1955) (from Madagascar)
- Typhonia vorticosa (Meyrick, 1930) (from India)
