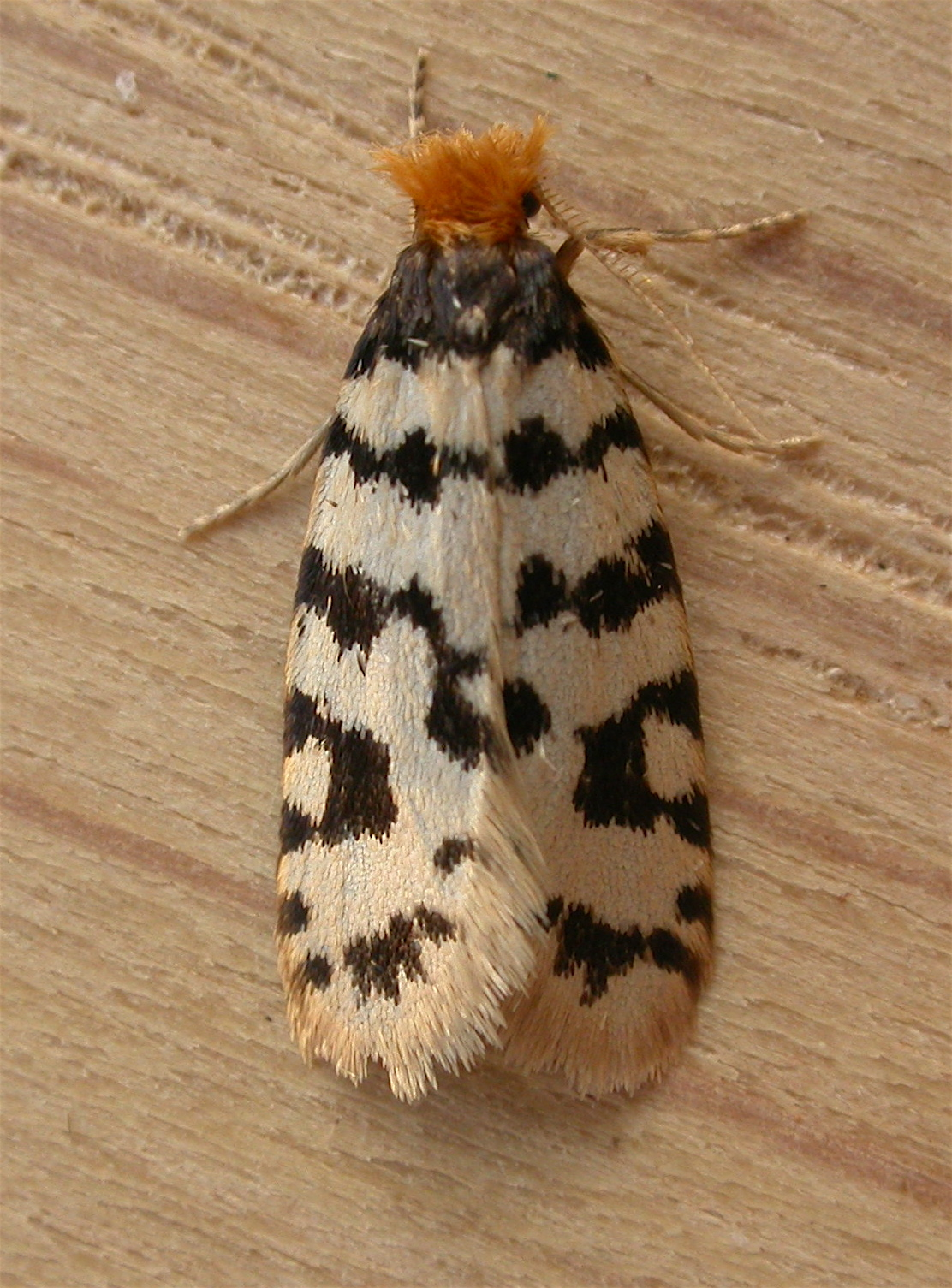
- Adult of an undescribed Iphierga species from Aranda (Australia)
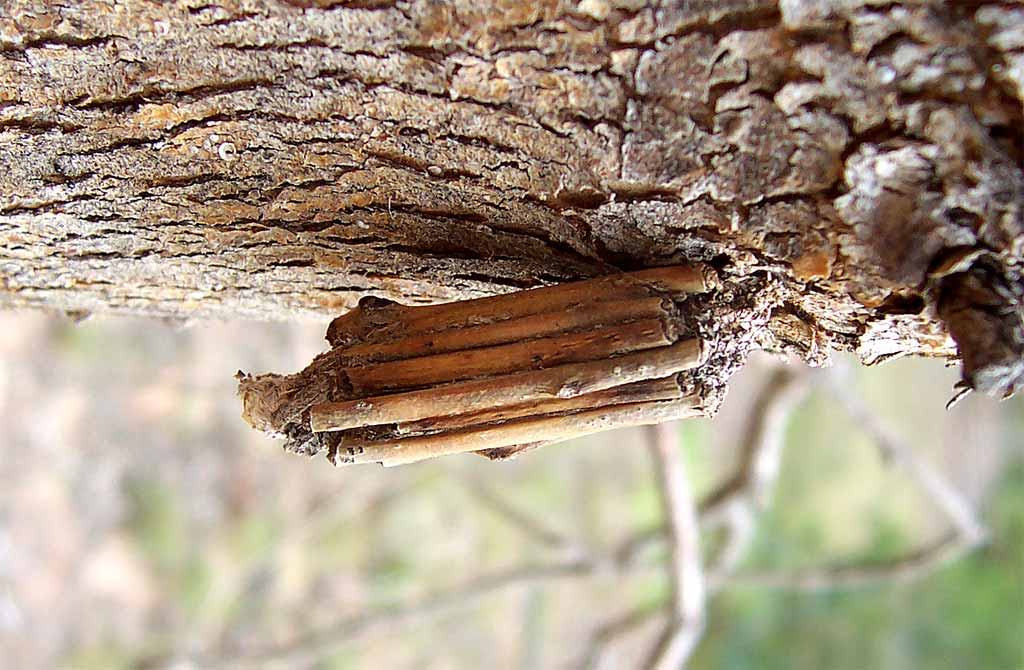
- "Bag" of unidentified species

Scientific classification
- Kingdom: Animalia
- Phylum: Arthropoda
- Clade: Pancrustacea
- Class: Insecta
- Order: Lepidoptera
- Superfamily: Tineoidea
- Family: Psychidae; Boisduval, 1828

Diversity
- 10 subfamilies, 241 genera and 1,350 species

= Bagworm moth =

Family of moths known as Psychidae

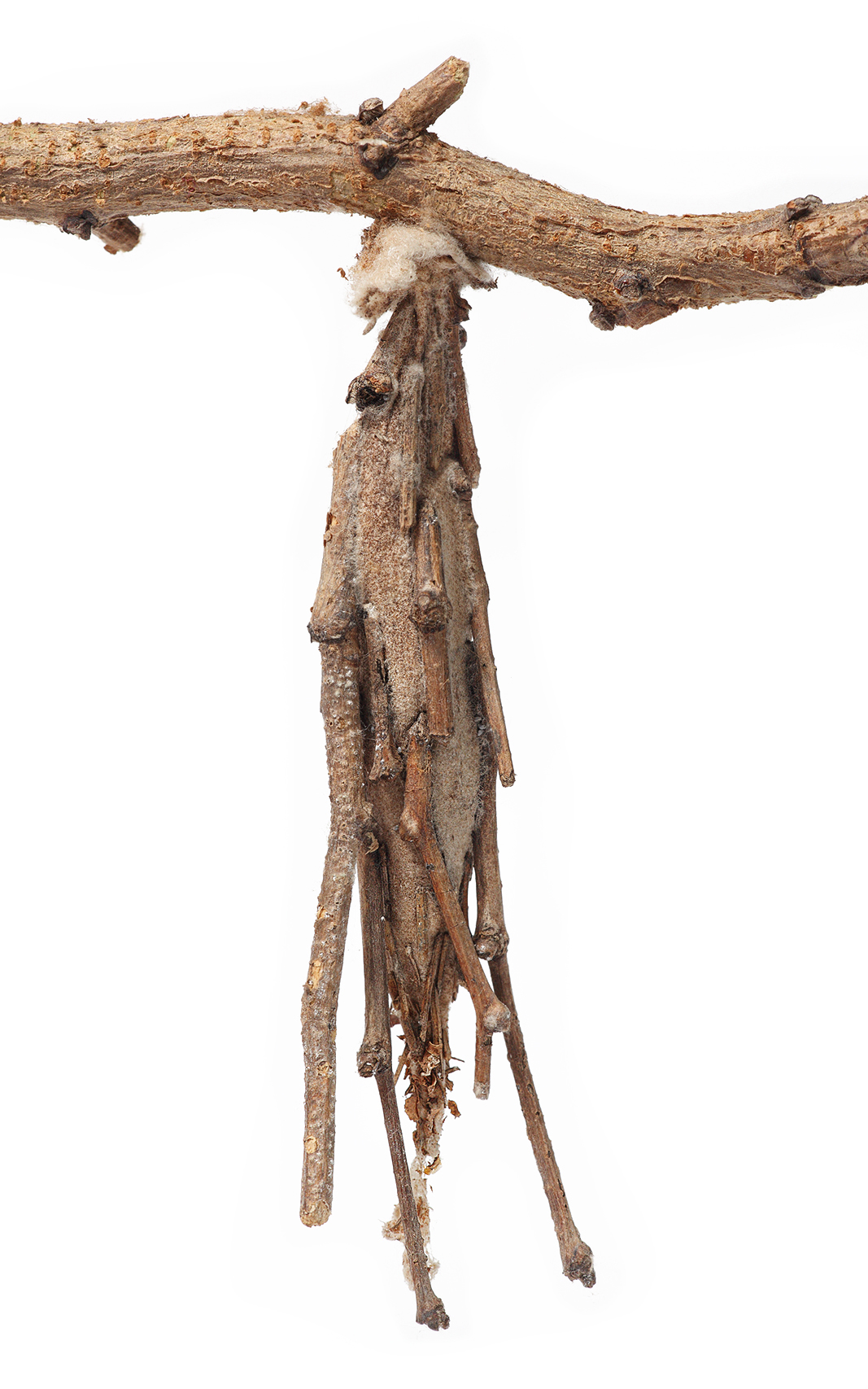
Bag of Metura elongatus which can grow to more than 120 mm (4.7 in) in length

Bagworm moth caterpillar locomotion

The Psychidae (bagworm moths, also simply bagworms or bagmoths) are a family of the Lepidoptera (butterflies and moths). The bagworm family is fairly small, with about 1,350 species described. Bagworm species are found globally, with some, such as the snailcase bagworm (Apterona helicoidella), in modern times settling continents where they are not native.

Another common name for the Psychidae is "case moths", but this is just as well used for the case-bearers (Coleophoridae). The names refer to the habits of caterpillars of these two families, which build small protective cases in which they can hide.

The Psychidae belong to the superfamily Tineoidea, which appears to be sister to the other lineages of the Ditrysia. They are not closely related to moths of the superfamily Gelechioidea, which includes case-bearers.

Most bagworms are inoffensive to humans and inconspicuous; some are occasional nuisance pests. However, a few species can become more serious pests, and have caused significant damage e.g., to wattle (Acacia mearnsii) in South Africa and orange (Citrus × sinensis) in Florida. If detected early, picking the cases from the trees while in their pupa stage is an effective way to check an infestation; otherwise, insecticides are used. One bagworm species, the fangalabola (Deborrea malgassa) of Madagascar, is in some places encouraged to breed on wattle trees, because its pupae are collected as a protein-rich food.

== Description ==
The caterpillar larvae of Psychidae construct cases out of silk and environmental materials such as sand, soil, lichen, or plant materials. These cases are attached to rocks, trees or fences while resting or during their pupa stage, but are otherwise mobile. The larvae of some species eat lichen, while others prefer green leaves. In many species, the adult females lack wings and are therefore difficult to identify accurately. Case-bearer cases are usually much smaller, flimsier, and consist mainly of silk, while bagworm "bags" resemble caddisfly cases in their outward appearance – a mass of (mainly) plant detritus spun together with silk on the inside.

Bagworm cases range in size from less than 1 cm to 15 cm among some tropical species. Each species makes a case particular to its species, making the case more useful to identify the species than the creature itself. Cases among the more primitive species are flat. More specialized species exhibit a greater variety of case size, shape, and composition, usually narrowing on both ends. The attachment substance used to affix the bag to a host plant or structure has a higher tensile strength than that of other moth species, requiring greater force to initiate breakage. Body markings are rare. Adult females of many bagworm species are larviform, with only vestigial wings, legs, and mouthparts. In some species, parthenogenesis is known. The adult males of most species are strong fliers with well-developed wings and feathery antennae but survive only long enough to reproduce due to underdeveloped mouthparts that prevent them from feeding. Most male bagworm wings have few of the scales characteristic of most moths, instead having a thin covering of hairs.

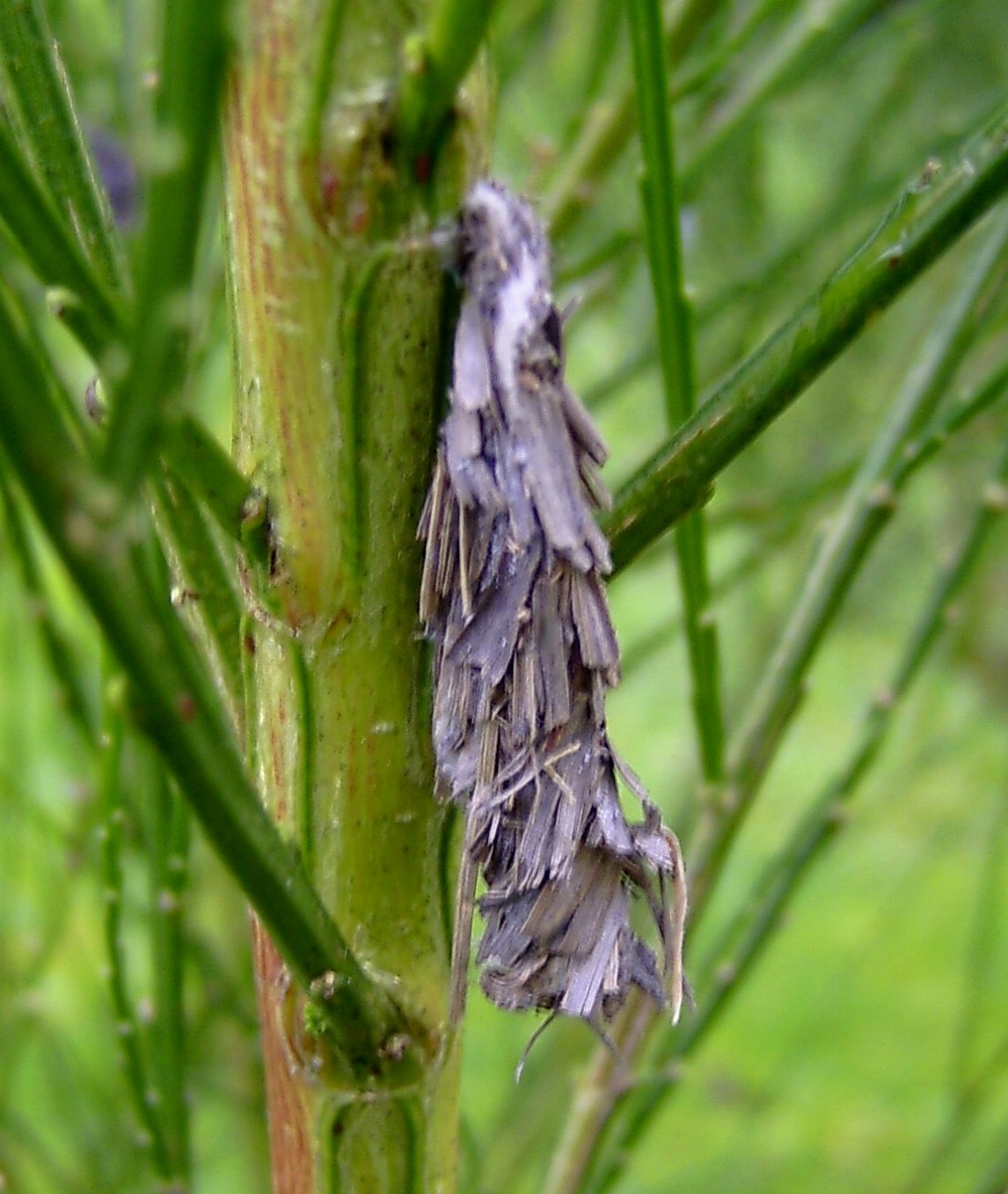
"Bag" of Pachythelia villosella (Oiketicinae)

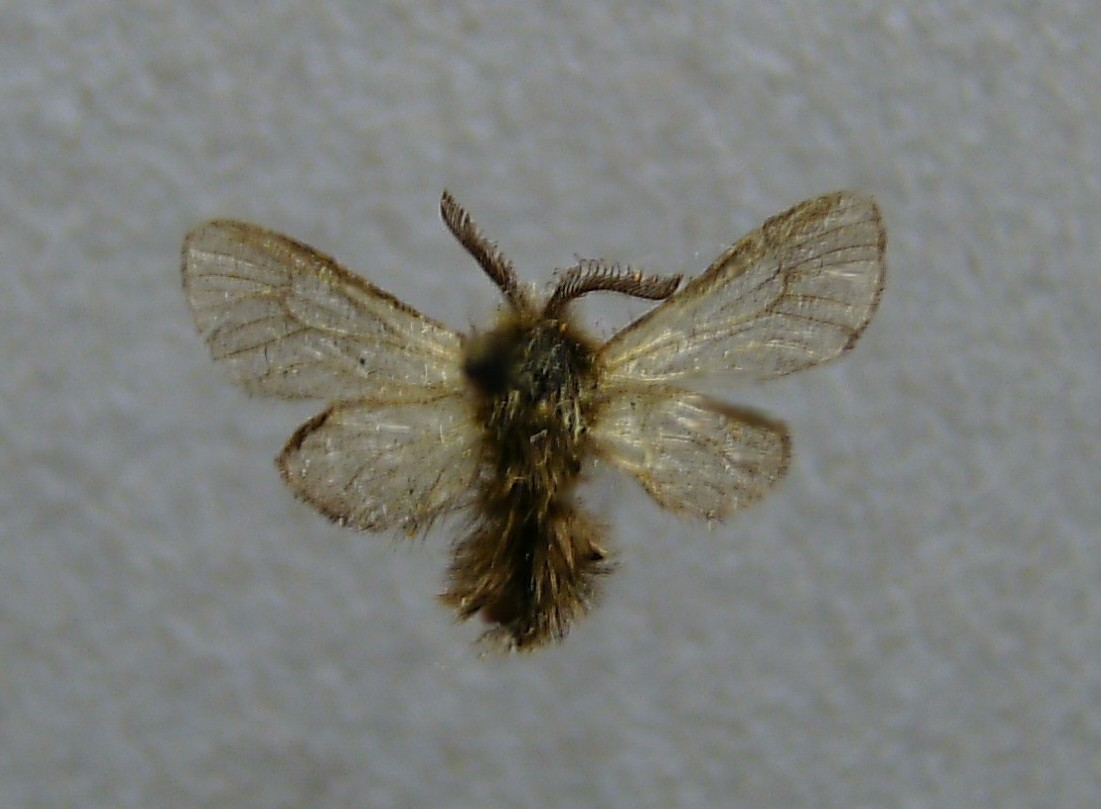
Adult specimen of Phalacropterix graslinella (Oiketicinae)

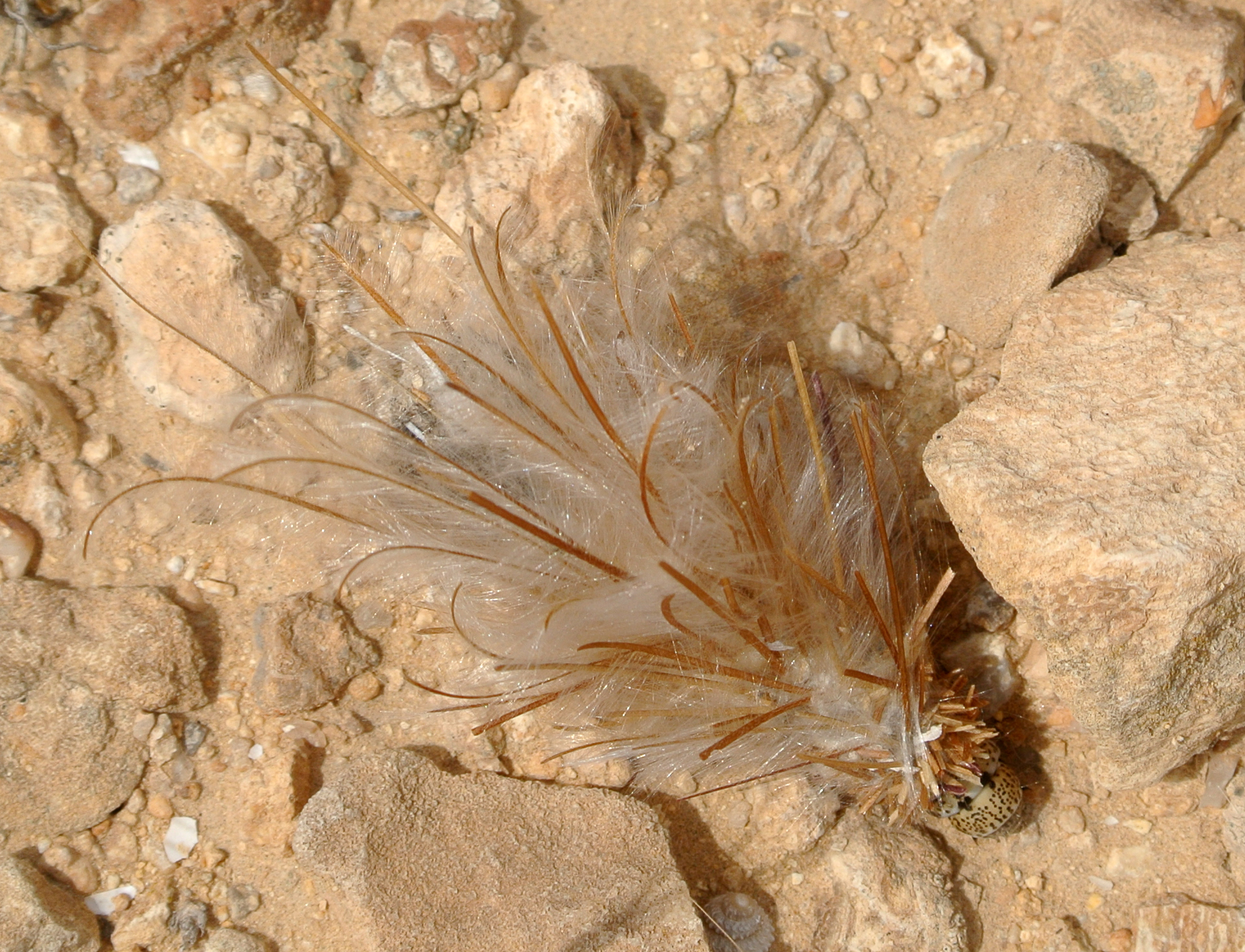
Bagworm larva in the Negev (April 2014). Case is made mostly of feathery stork's bill seeds (Erodium cicutarium)

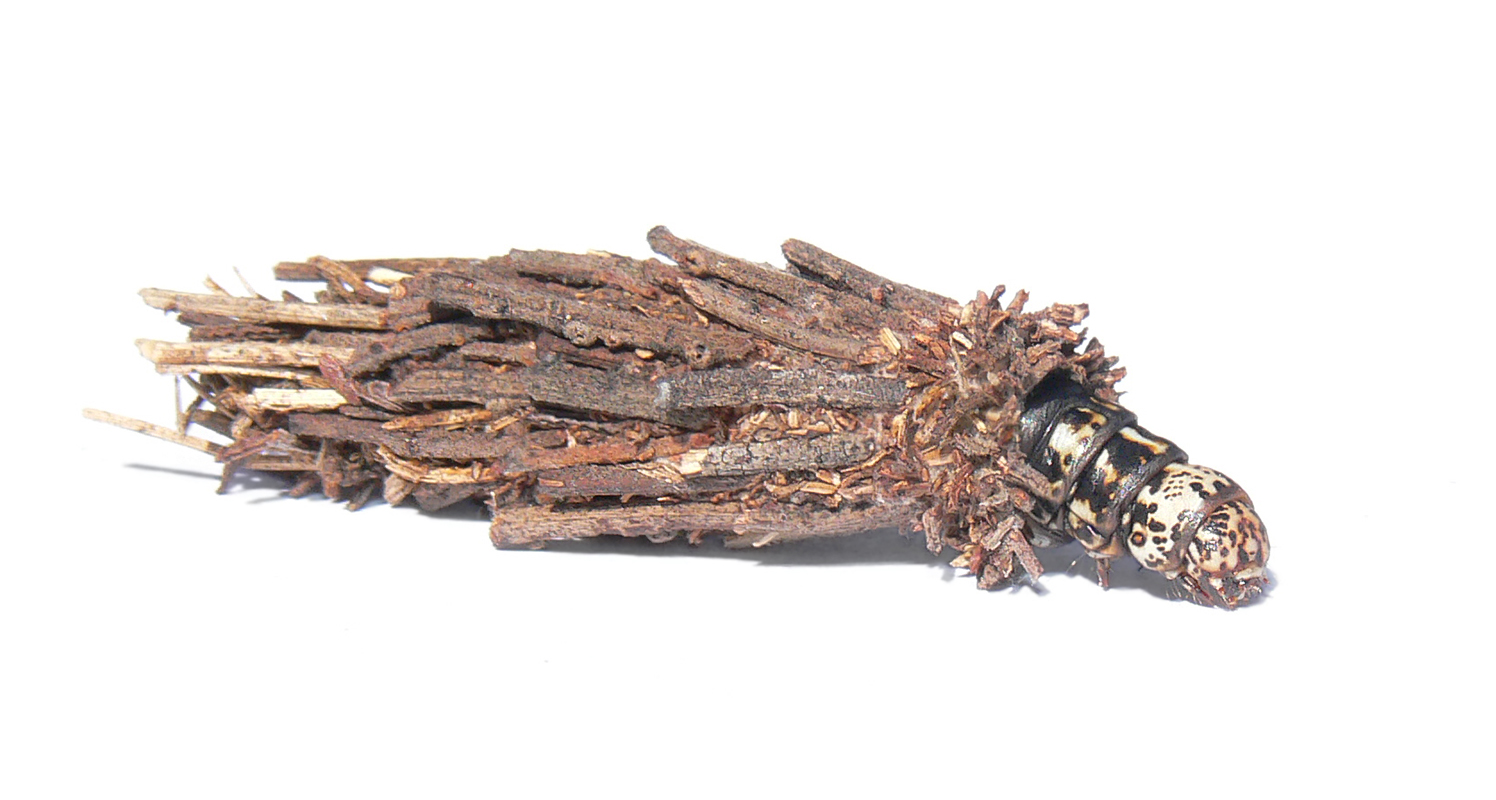
Bagworm (possibly Hyalarcta huebneri) extending its forequarters from its case in the act of locomotion

== Ecology ==
In the larval stage, bagworms extend their head and thorax from their mobile case to devour the leaves of host plants, often leading to the defoliation of their hosts. Trees infested with bagworms exhibit increasingly damaged foliage as the infestation increases, which may result in gradual mortality accrual, especially on tree plantations in tropical regions where bagworms are more frequently multivoltine (having multiple generations a year). Some bagworms are specialized in their host plants (monophagous), while others can feed on a variety of plant species (polyphagous). A few species also consume small arthropods (such as the camphor scale Pseudaonidia duplex, a scale insect). One bagworm species was found to eat an orb-web of Plebs sachalinensis (Araneae, Araneidae) entirely.

Since bagworm cases are composed of silk and the materials from their habitat, they are naturally camouflaged from predators. Predators include birds and other insects. Birds often eat the egg-laden bodies of female bagworms after they have died. Since the eggs are very hard-shelled, they can pass through the bird's digestive system unharmed, promoting the spread of the species over wide areas.

A bagworm begins to build its case as soon as it hatches. Once the case is built, only adult males ever leave the case, never to return, when they take flight to find a mate. Bagworms add material to the front of the case as they grow, excreting waste materials through the opening in the back of the case. When satiated with leaves, a bagworm caterpillar secures its case and pupates. The adult female, which is wingless, either emerges from the case long enough for breeding or remains in the case while the male extends his abdomen into the female's case to breed. Females lay their eggs in their case and die. The female evergreen bagworm (Thyridopteryx ephemeraeformis) dies without laying eggs, and the larval bagworm offspring emerge from the parent's body. Some bagworm species are parthenogenetic, meaning their eggs develop without male fertilization. Each bagworm generation lives just long enough as adults to mate and reproduce in their annual cycle.

== Systematics ==
Ten subfamilies and about 240 genera are recognized among the bagworms.

The subfamilies of Psychidae, with some notable genera and species also listed, are:

Subfamily Epichnopteriginae

- Acentra
- Bijugis
- Epichnopterix
  - Epichnopterix plumella
- Heliopsychidea
- Mauropterix
- Montanima
- Psychidea
- Psychocentra
- Rebelia
- Reisseronia
- Stichobasis
  - Stichobasis postmeridianus
- Whittleia
  - Whittleia retiella

Subfamily Naryciinae

- Dahlica Enderlein, 1912
  - Dahlica triquetrella
- Eosolenobia Filipjev, 1924
- Narycia
- Postsolenobia Meier, 1958
- Siederia

Subfamily Oiketicinae

- Apterona
  - Apterona helicoidella – (snailcase bagworm)
- Canephora
  - Canephora hirsuta
- Cryptothelea (= Platoeceticus)
  - Cryptothelea gloverii
- Astala
- Kotochalia
  - Kotochalia junodi – (wattle bagworm)
- Hyalarcta
- Deborrea
  - Deborrea malgassa – (fangalabola)
- Eumeta
  - Eumeta crameri – (faggot worm)
- Megalophanes
  - Megalophanes viciella
- Oiketicus
- Zamopsyche
- Eucoloneura
- Pachythelia
- Phalacropterix
- Ptilocephala
  - Ptilocephala plumifera
- Sterrhopterix
  - Sterrhopterix fusca
- Thyridopteryx

Subfamily Placodominae

- Placodoma

Subfamily Psychinae

- Liothula
  - Liothula omnivora
- Luffia
  - Luffia ferchaultella
  - Luffia lapidella
- Psyche
  - Psyche casta
  - Psyche crassiorella
  - Psyche rassei
  - Psyche saxicolella
- Prochalia

Subfamily Taleporiinae

- Bankesia Tutt, 1899
  - Bankesia conspurcatella
- Brevantennia Sieder, 1953
- Cebysa
  - Cebysa leucotelus – (Australian bagmoth)
- Diplodoma
  - Diplodoma adspersella
- Eotaleporia Sauter, 1986
- Grypotheca Dugdale, 1987
- Praesolenobia Sieder, 1954
- Pseudobankesia Meier, 1963
- Sciopetris Meyrick, 1891
- Taleporia

Subfamily Typhoniinae

- Typhonia
  - Typhonia animosa
  - Typhonia bimaculata

Incertae sedis

- Eumasia
  - Eumasia crisostomella
  - Eumasia parietariella (Heydenreich, 1851)
- Iphierga
  - Iphierga chrysophaes Turner, 1917

Subfamily Scoriodytinae

- Scoriodyta Meyrick, 1888
  - Scoriodyta conisalia Meyrick, 1888

Subfamily Metisinae

- Metisa Hampson, 1895
  - Metisa canifrons Hampson, 1895

Subfamily Pseudarbelinae

- Pseudarbela Sauber, 1902
  - Pseudarbela celaena (Bethune-Baker, 1904)
  - Pseudarbela aurea (Bethune-Baker, 1904)
  - Pseudarbela papuana Clench, 1959
  - Pseudarbela semperi Sauber, 1902
- Casana Walker, 1865
  - Casana trochiloides Walker, 1865
- Linggana Roepke, 1957
  - Linggana cardinaali Roepke, 1957

== Applications ==
The silk of bagworm moth larvae is reportedly "more durable than spider silk". Japanese pharmaceutical company Kowa and the National Agriculture and Food Research Organization announced a new textile, Minolon, in 2024, that combined carbon fibers with sheets of bagworm silk. The resulting material was claimed to be environmentally friendly, with Kowa planning to sell it to aircraft, automobile, and sporting good manufacturers.
