= List of moths of India (Psychidae) =

This is a list of moths of the family Psychidae that are found in India. It also acts as an index to the species articles and forms part of the full List of moths of India.

== Subfamily Oiketicinae ==
=== Genus Dappula ===
- Dappula tertia Templeton, 1847 (= Oeceticus tertius (Templeton, 1847) sensu Hampson, 1892)

=== Genus Eumeta ===
- Eumeta crameri (Westwood, 1854) (= Clania crameri (Westwood, 1854) sensu Hampson, 1892)
- Eumeta variegata (Snellen, 1879) (= Clania variegata (Snellen, 1879) sensu Hampson, 1892)

=== Genus Acanthopsyche ===
- Acanthopsyche bipars Walker, 1865 (= Acanthospyche (Oeceticoides) bipars (Walker, 1865) sensu Hampson, 1892)
- Acanthopsyche cana Hampson, 1892 (= Acanthospyche (Oeceticoides) cana Hampson, 1892 [1893] sensu Hampson, 1892)

== Subfamily Psychinae ==
=== Genus Psyche ===
==== Subgenus Manatha ====
- Manatha albipes Moore

==== Subgenus Heyla ====
- Heyla griseata Hampson
- Heyla fusca Hampson
- Heyla nudilineata Hampson

==== Subgenus Chalioides ====
- Chalioides vitrea Hampson

==== Subgenus Eurycyttarus ====
- Eurycyttarus pileata Hampson
- Eurycyttarus nigra Hampson
- Eurycyttarus rotunda Hampson
- Eurycyttarus decemvena Hampson

==== Subgenus Barandra ====
- Barandra fumata Moore

== Subfamily Chaliinae ==
=== Genus Kotochalia ===
- Kotochalia doubledayi Westwood

=== Genus Mahasena ===
- Mahasena andamana Moore
- Mahasena hockingij Moore

=== Genus Pteroxys ===
- Pteroxys goniatus Hampson
- Pteroxys uniformis Hampson

== Subfamily Canephorinae ==
=== Genus Moffatia ===
- Moffatia plumicauda Moore

== Subfamily Psychoidinae ==
=== Genus Diabasis ===
- Diabasis nilgirensis Hampson

=== Genus Aprata ===
- Aprata mackwoodi Moore

== Subfamily unassigned ==
=== Genus Bambalina ===
- Bambalina consorta (Templeton, 1847) (= Amatissa consorta (Templeton, 1847) sensu Hampson, 1892)

=== Genus Kophene ===
- Kophene cuprea Moore, 1892 (= Amatissa cuprea (Moore, 1892) sensu Hampson, 1892)
- Kophene snelleni Heylaerts, 1890 (= Acanthospyche (Metisa) snelleni (Heylaerts, 1890) sensu Hampson, 1892)
- Kophene minor Moore, 1879 (= Acanthospyche (Oeceticoides) minor (Moore, 1879) sensu Hampson, 1892)

=== Genus Dasaratha ===
- Dasaratha himalayana Moore, 1888 (= Acanthospyche (Dasaratha) himalayana (Moore, 1888) sensu Hampson, 1892)

=== Genus Urobarba ===
- Urobarba longicauda Warren, 1888 (= Acanthospyche (Dasaratha) longicauda (Warren, 1888) sensu Hampson, 1892)

=== Genus Brachycyttarus ===
- Brachycyttarus subteralbatus Hampson, 1892 (= Acanthospyche (Brachycyttarus) subteralbata Hampson, 1892 [1893] sensu Hampson, 1892)

=== Genus Pteroma ===
- plagiophleps Hampson, 1892 (= Acanthospyche (Pteroma) plagiophleps Hampson, 1892 [1893] sensu Hampson, 1892)

=== Genus Metisa ===
- Metisa plana Walker, 1883 (= Acanthospyche (Metisa) plana (Walker, 1883) sensu Hampson, 1892)
- Metisa moorei (Heylaerts, 1890) (= Acanthospyche (Metisa) moorei (Heylaerts, 1890) sensu Hampson, 1892)

=== Genus Narycia ===
- Narycia berecynthia Meyrick, 1931

=== Genus Psomocolax ===
- Psomocolax rhabdophora (Hampson, 1892) (= Acanthospyche (Amicta) rhabdophora (Hampson, 1892 [1893]) sensu Hampson, 1892)

=== Genus Acanthoecia ===
- Acanthoecia larminati (Heylaerts, 1904)

== Genus Sapheneutis ==
- Sapheneutis crocotricha Meyrick, 1910
- Sapheneutis colocynthia Meyrick, 1916
- Sapheneutis galerita Meyrick, 1911

== Genus Typhonia ==
- Typhonia autochthonia (Meyrick, 1931)
- Typhonia brachiata (Meyrick, 1919)
- Typhonia campestris (Meyrick, 1916)
- Typhonia certatrix (Meyrick, 1916)
- Typhonia coagulata (Meyrick, 1919)
- Typhonia colonica (Meyrick, 1916)
- Typhonia cremata (Meyrick, 1916)
- Typhonia deposita (Meyrick, 1919)
- Typhonia exsecrata (Meyrick, 1937)
- Typhonia gregaria (Meyrick, 1916)
- Typhonia imparata (Meyrick, 1928)
- Typhonia infensa (Meyrick, 1916)
- Typhonia isopeda (Meyrick, 1907)
- Typhonia jactata (Meyrick, 1937)
- Typhonia lignosa (Meyrick, 1917)
- Typhonia meliphaea (Meyrick, 1916)
- Typhonia multiplex (Meyrick, 1917)
- Typhonia nota (Meyrick, 1919)
- Typhonia obtrectans (Meyrick, 1930)
- Typhonia onthostola (Meyrick, 1937)(
- Typhonia paraclasta (Meyrick, 1922)
- Typhonia paricropa (Meyrick, 1907)
- Typhonia pericrossa (Meyrick, 1907)
- Typhonia phaeogenes (Meyrick, 1919)
- Typhonia praecepta (Meyrick, 1916)
- Typhonia ptyalistis (Meyrick, 1937)
- Typhonia ramifera (Meyrick, 1916)
- Typhonia rhythmopis (Meyrick, 1928) (Andamans)
- Typhonia semota (Meyrick, 1937)
- Typhonia subacta (Meyrick, 1919)
- Typhonia tylota (Meyrick, 1916)
- Typhonia vorticosa (Meyrick, 1930)

== See also ==
- Psychidae (bagworm moths)
- Moths
- Lepidoptera
- List of moths of India
