= Melanaema ni =

Scientific classification
- Domain: Eukaryota
- Kingdom: Animalia
- Phylum: Arthropoda
- Class: Insecta
- Order: Lepidoptera
- Superfamily: Noctuoidea
- Family: Erebidae
- Subfamily: Arctiinae
- Genus: Melanaema
- Species: M. ni

Binomial name
- Melanaema ni (Heylaerts, 1891)

Synonyms
- Lyclene ni Heylaerts, 1891

Species of moth

Melanaema ni is a moth in the family Erebidae. It was described by Franciscus J. M. Heylaerts in 1891. It is found on Java.
