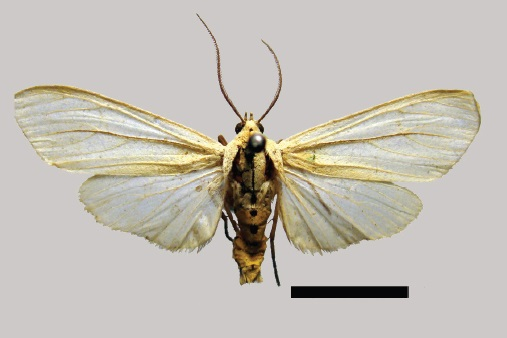
- Biturix rectilinea

Scientific classification
- Kingdom: Animalia
- Phylum: Arthropoda
- Class: Insecta
- Order: Lepidoptera
- Superfamily: Noctuoidea
- Family: Erebidae
- Subfamily: Arctiinae
- Subtribe: Phaegopterina
- Genus: Biturix; Walker, 1855

= Biturix =

Genus of moths

Biturix is a genus of moths in the subfamily Arctiinae.

== Species ==
- Biturix diversipes Walker, 1855
- Biturix grisea Dognin, 1899
- Biturix hoffmannsi Rothschild, 1909
- Biturix intactus (Walker, 1855)
- Biturix lanceolata (Walker, 1856)
- Biturix pellucida (Sepp, [1852])
- Biturix pervenosa Forbes, 1939
- Biturix rectilinea (Burmeister, 1878)
- Biturix venosata (Walker, [1865])

== Former species ==
- Biturix mathani Rothschild, 1909
