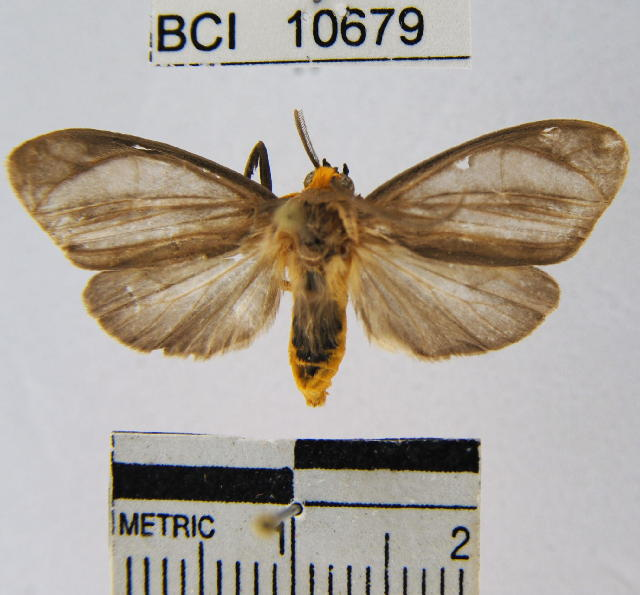

Scientific classification
- Domain: Eukaryota
- Kingdom: Animalia
- Phylum: Arthropoda
- Class: Insecta
- Order: Lepidoptera
- Superfamily: Noctuoidea
- Family: Erebidae
- Subfamily: Arctiinae
- Genus: Tricypha
- Species: T. imperialis

Binomial name
- Tricypha imperialis (Heylaerts, 1884)

Synonyms
- Romanoffia imperialis Heylaerts, 1884; Romanoffia imperialis Heylaerts, 1885

= Tricypha imperialis =

Species of moth

Tricypha imperialis is a moth in the family Erebidae. It was described by Franciscus J. M. Heylaerts in 1884. It is found in Mexico, Panama, Peru, Ecuador and Brazil.
