= Acanthopsyche subteralbata =

Scientific classification
- Kingdom: Animalia
- Phylum: Arthropoda
- Class: Insecta
- Order: Lepidoptera
- Family: Psychidae
- Genus: Acanthopsyche
- Species: A. subteralbata

Binomial name
- Acanthopsyche subteralbata Hampson, 1897

Species of moth

Acanthopsyche subteralbata is a moth of the family Psychidae first described by George Hampson in 1897. It is found in India and Sri Lanka.

Larval host plants are Camellia sinensis and Albizia.
