= Eugoa bipuncta =

Scientific classification
- Domain: Eukaryota
- Kingdom: Animalia
- Phylum: Arthropoda
- Class: Insecta
- Order: Lepidoptera
- Superfamily: Noctuoidea
- Family: Erebidae
- Subfamily: Arctiinae
- Genus: Eugoa
- Species: E. bipuncta

Binomial name
- Eugoa bipuncta (Heylaerts, 1891)

Synonyms
- Paidia bipuncta Heylaerts, 1891; Eugoa bipunctata heylaertsi Seitz, 1914

Species of moth

Eugoa bipuncta is a moth of the family Erebidae first described by Franciscus J. M. Heylaerts in 1891. It is found in Sundaland and on Sulawesi and the Lesser Sunda Islands. The habitat consists of lowland forests.
