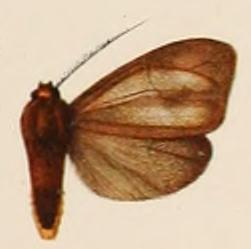
- Tricypha nigrescens

Scientific classification
- Domain: Eukaryota
- Kingdom: Animalia
- Phylum: Arthropoda
- Class: Insecta
- Order: Lepidoptera
- Superfamily: Noctuoidea
- Family: Erebidae
- Subfamily: Arctiinae
- Tribe: Arctiini
- Subtribe: Phaegopterina
- Genus: Tricypha; Möschler, 1878

Synonyms
- Maenoleneura Butler, 1878; Romanoffia Heylaerts, 1884; Romanoffia Heylaerts, 1885

= Tricypha =

Genus of moths

Tricypha is a genus of moths in the family Erebidae. The genus was erected by Möschler in 1878.

== Species ==
- Tricypha furcata Möschler, 1878
- Tricypha imperialis (Heylaerts, 1884)
- Tricypha mathani (Rothschild, 1909)
- Tricypha nigrescens Rothschild, 1909
- Tricypha obscura (Hampson, 1898)
- Tricypha ochrea (Hampson, 1901)
- Tricypha popayana Dognin, 1923
- Tricypha proxima (Grote, 1867)
- Tricypha pseudotricypha (Rothschild, 1909)
- Tricypha rosenbergi (Rothschild, 1910)
