= Biturix pervenosa =

Scientific classification
- Kingdom: Animalia
- Phylum: Arthropoda
- Clade: Pancrustacea
- Class: Insecta
- Order: Lepidoptera
- Superfamily: Noctuoidea
- Family: Erebidae
- Subfamily: Arctiinae
- Genus: Biturix
- Species: B. pervenosa

Binomial name
- Biturix pervenosa Forbes, 1939

Species of moth

Biturix pervenosa is a moth of the family Erebidae. It was described by William Trowbridge Merrifield Forbes in 1939. It is found in Panama.
