= Eugoa africana =

Scientific classification
- Kingdom: Animalia
- Phylum: Arthropoda
- Class: Insecta
- Order: Lepidoptera
- Superfamily: Noctuoidea
- Family: Erebidae
- Subfamily: Arctiinae
- Genus: Eugoa
- Species: E. africana

Binomial name
- Eugoa africana Hampson, 1900

Species of moth

Eugoa africana is a moth of the family Erebidae. It is found in South Africa.
