= Eugoa humerana =

Scientific classification
- Kingdom: Animalia
- Phylum: Arthropoda
- Class: Insecta
- Order: Lepidoptera
- Superfamily: Noctuoidea
- Family: Erebidae
- Subfamily: Arctiinae
- Genus: Eugoa
- Species: E. humerana

Binomial name
- Eugoa humerana (Walker, 1863)

Synonyms
- Tospitis humerana Walker, 1863

Species of moth

Eugoa humerana is a moth of the family Erebidae first described by Francis Walker in 1863. It is found on Borneo, Peninsular Malaysia, Sumatra and Java. The habitat consists of forests.

Adults have pale brown forewings. The hindwings are darker and greyer.
