= Tricypha proxima =

Scientific classification
- Kingdom: Animalia
- Phylum: Arthropoda
- Class: Insecta
- Order: Lepidoptera
- Superfamily: Noctuoidea
- Family: Erebidae
- Subfamily: Arctiinae
- Genus: Tricypha
- Species: T. proxima

Binomial name
- Tricypha proxima (Grote, 1867)

Synonyms
- Erithales proxima Grote, 1867

Species of moth

Tricypha proxima is a moth in the subfamily Arctiinae. It was described by Augustus Radcliffe Grote in 1867. It is found on Cuba.
