= Tricypha popayana =

Scientific classification
- Domain: Eukaryota
- Kingdom: Animalia
- Phylum: Arthropoda
- Class: Insecta
- Order: Lepidoptera
- Superfamily: Noctuoidea
- Family: Erebidae
- Subfamily: Arctiinae
- Genus: Tricypha
- Species: T. popayana

Binomial name
- Tricypha popayana Dognin, 1923

Species of moth

Tricypha popayana is a moth in the subfamily Arctiinae. It was described by Paul Dognin in 1923. It is found in Colombia.
