= Melanaema =

Scientific classification
- Domain: Eukaryota
- Kingdom: Animalia
- Phylum: Arthropoda
- Class: Insecta
- Order: Lepidoptera
- Superfamily: Noctuoidea
- Family: Erebidae
- Subfamily: Arctiinae
- Tribe: Lithosiini
- Genus: Melanaema; Butler, 1877

Genus of moths

Melanaema is a genus of moths in the family Erebidae erected by Arthur Gardiner Butler in 1877.

== Species ==
- Melanaema ni (Heylaerts, 1891)
- Melanaema sanguinea Hampson, 1900
- Melanaema venata Butler, 1877
