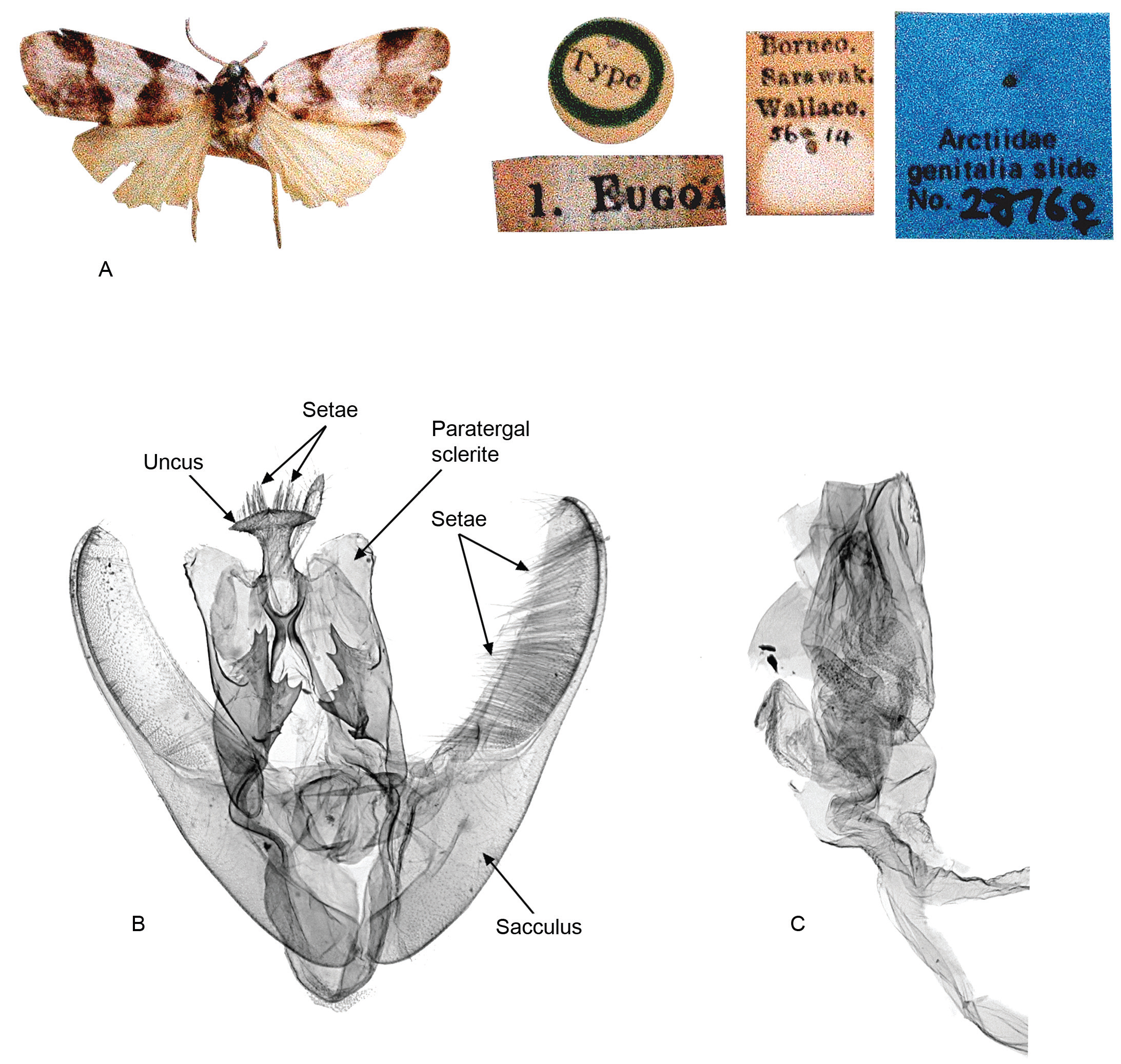

Scientific classification
- Kingdom: Animalia
- Phylum: Arthropoda
- Clade: Pancrustacea
- Class: Insecta
- Order: Lepidoptera
- Superfamily: Noctuoidea
- Family: Erebidae
- Subfamily: Arctiinae
- Genus: Eugoa
- Species: E. aequalis

Binomial name
- Eugoa aequalis Walker, 1858

Synonyms
- Lyclene imposita Walker, 1862

= Eugoa aequalis =

Species of moth

Eugoa aequalis is a moth of the family Erebidae first described by Francis Walker in 1858. It is found on Borneo, Peninsular Malaysia and Sumatra. The habitat consists of lowland areas, where it is found in various forest types, including heath, coastal and secondary forests.

The ground colour is very pale grey with blackish bands.
