= Biturix grisea =

Scientific classification
- Domain: Eukaryota
- Kingdom: Animalia
- Phylum: Arthropoda
- Class: Insecta
- Order: Lepidoptera
- Superfamily: Noctuoidea
- Family: Erebidae
- Subfamily: Arctiinae
- Genus: Biturix
- Species: B. grisea

Binomial name
- Biturix grisea Dognin, 1899

Species of moth

Biturix grisea is a moth of the family Erebidae. It was described by Paul Dognin in 1899. It is found in Colombia.
