= Biturix lanceolata =

Scientific classification
- Kingdom: Animalia
- Phylum: Arthropoda
- Class: Insecta
- Order: Lepidoptera
- Superfamily: Noctuoidea
- Family: Erebidae
- Subfamily: Arctiinae
- Genus: Biturix
- Species: B. lanceolata

Binomial name
- Biturix lanceolata (Walker, 1856)

Synonyms
- Aloa lanceolata Walker, 1856

Species of moth

Biturix lanceolata is a moth of the family Erebidae. It was described by Francis Walker in 1856. It is found on Haiti.
