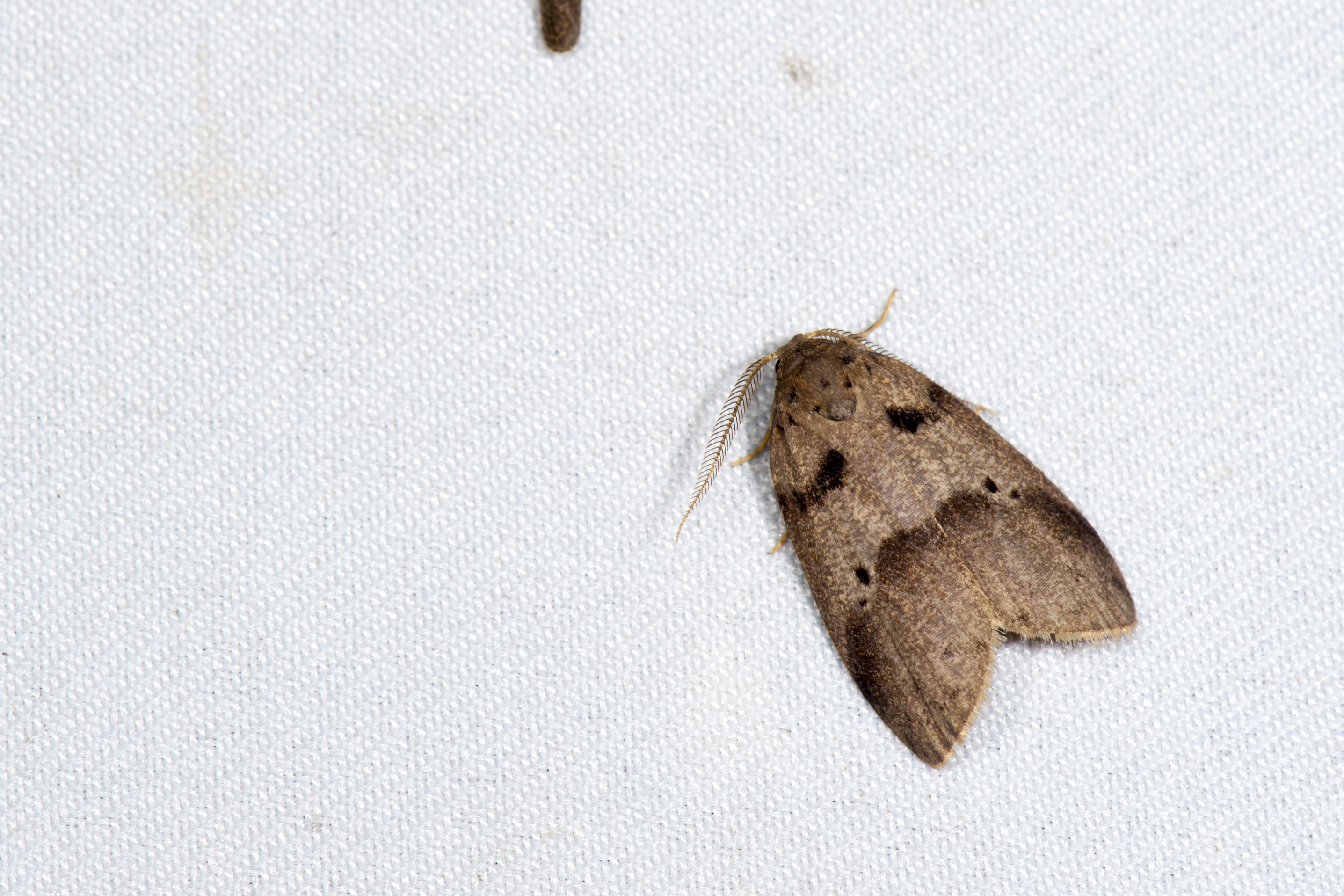
- Eugoa grisea

Scientific classification
- Domain: Eukaryota
- Kingdom: Animalia
- Phylum: Arthropoda
- Class: Insecta
- Order: Lepidoptera
- Superfamily: Noctuoidea
- Family: Erebidae
- Subfamily: Arctiinae
- Genus: Eugoa
- Species: E. grisea

Binomial name
- Eugoa grisea Butler, 1877

Synonyms
- Eugoa grisea ab. clarior Strand, 1917; Eugoa suffusa Wileman, 1910

= Eugoa grisea =

Species of moth

Eugoa grisea is a moth of the family Erebidae first described by Arthur Gardiner Butler in 1877. It is found in Japan and China.
