= Eugoa bipunctata =

Scientific classification
- Kingdom: Animalia
- Phylum: Arthropoda
- Class: Insecta
- Order: Lepidoptera
- Superfamily: Noctuoidea
- Family: Erebidae
- Subfamily: Arctiinae
- Genus: Eugoa
- Species: E. bipunctata

Binomial name
- Eugoa bipunctata (Walker, 1862)

Synonyms
- Lyclene bipunctata Walker, 1862

Species of moth

Eugoa bipunctata is a moth of the family Erebidae first described by Francis Walker in 1862. It is found on Borneo and in Singapore. The habitat consists of lowland forests.
