= Acanthopsyche punctimarginalis =

Scientific classification
- Kingdom: Animalia
- Phylum: Arthropoda
- Class: Insecta
- Order: Lepidoptera
- Family: Psychidae
- Genus: Acanthopsyche
- Species: A. punctimarginalis

Binomial name
- Acanthopsyche punctimarginalis (Hampson, 1897)

Synonyms
- Hemilipia punctimarginalis Hampson, 1897

Species of moth

Acanthopsyche punctimarginalis is a moth in the Psychidae family. It is found in Sri Lanka.
