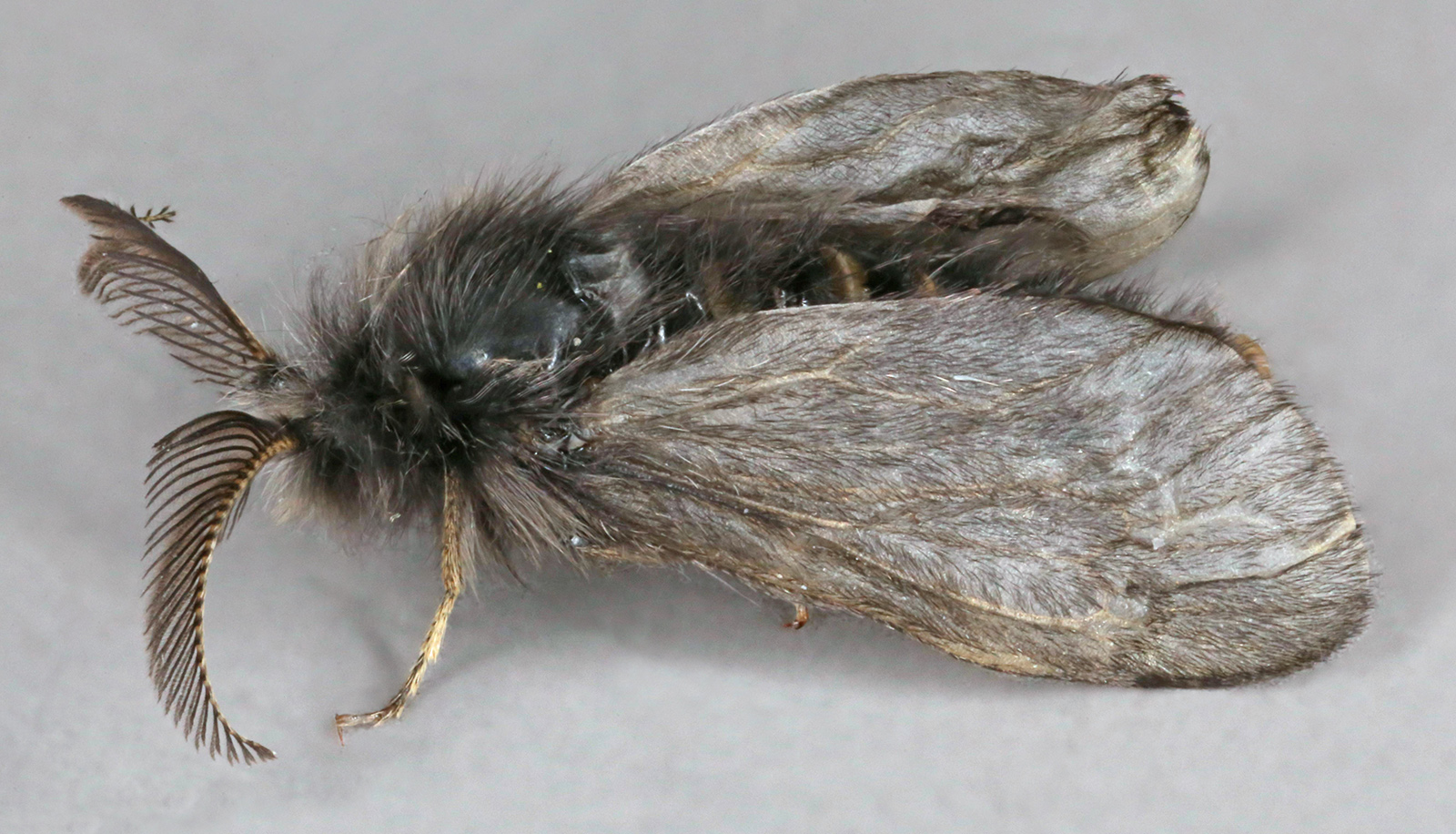
- Male Trawscoed, North Wales
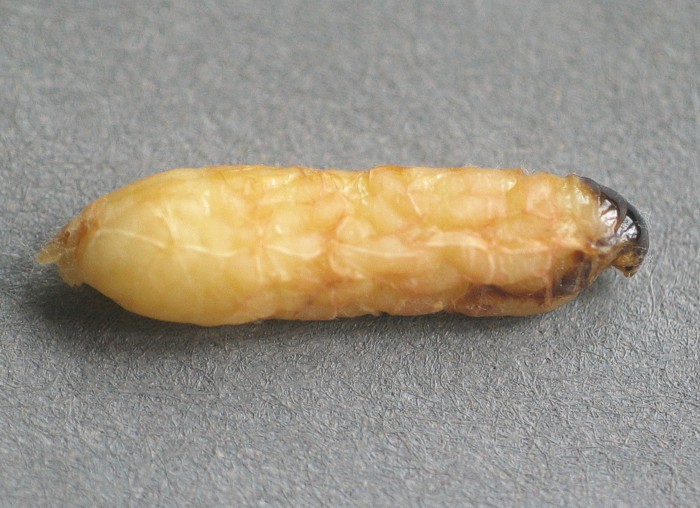
- Female

Scientific classification
- Kingdom: Animalia
- Phylum: Arthropoda
- Class: Insecta
- Order: Lepidoptera
- Family: Psychidae
- Genus: Acanthopsyche
- Species: A. atra

Binomial name
- Acanthopsyche atra (Linnaeus, 1767): Phalaena (Bombyx) atra Linnaeus, 1767; Psyche stigmatella Zetterstedt, 1840; Psyche opacella Herrich-Schäffer, [1846]; Psyche fenella Newman, 1850; Psyche hyalinella Stephens, 1850; Oiketicus nigricans Westwood, 1854; Psyche hispidella Heylaerts, 1884; Bombyx hieracii Thunberg, 1792; Chalia furva Kirby, 1892; Acanthopsyche hirsutella Tutt, 1900

= Acanthopsyche atra =

Species of moth

Acanthopsyche atra, the dusky sweep, is a moth of the family Psychidae. The habitat consists of heath and moorland.

== Description ==
The wingspan is 16–22 mm for males. The head, thorax, and abdomen of the male are fuscous-grey. The forewings and hindwings are very thinly haired with grey veins and base of cilia darker. Females are apterous (i.e. wingless) and have rudimentary antennae and legs.The female is without frontal prominence. Pairing takes place with the female still in the pupal case and she does not usually leave the pupal case. Her body is yellowish and the head and thoracic segments are dark brown. The eyes are reduced to black spots. Larvae are pale grey; head black : 2–4 with dark grey plates. The case is covered with longitudinally placed grass-fragments, seed vessels, etc. Adults emerge in May and June, males flying in the late afternoon and evening.

Eggs

Eggs are laid in the pupal skin in June or July and hatch within four to five weeks.

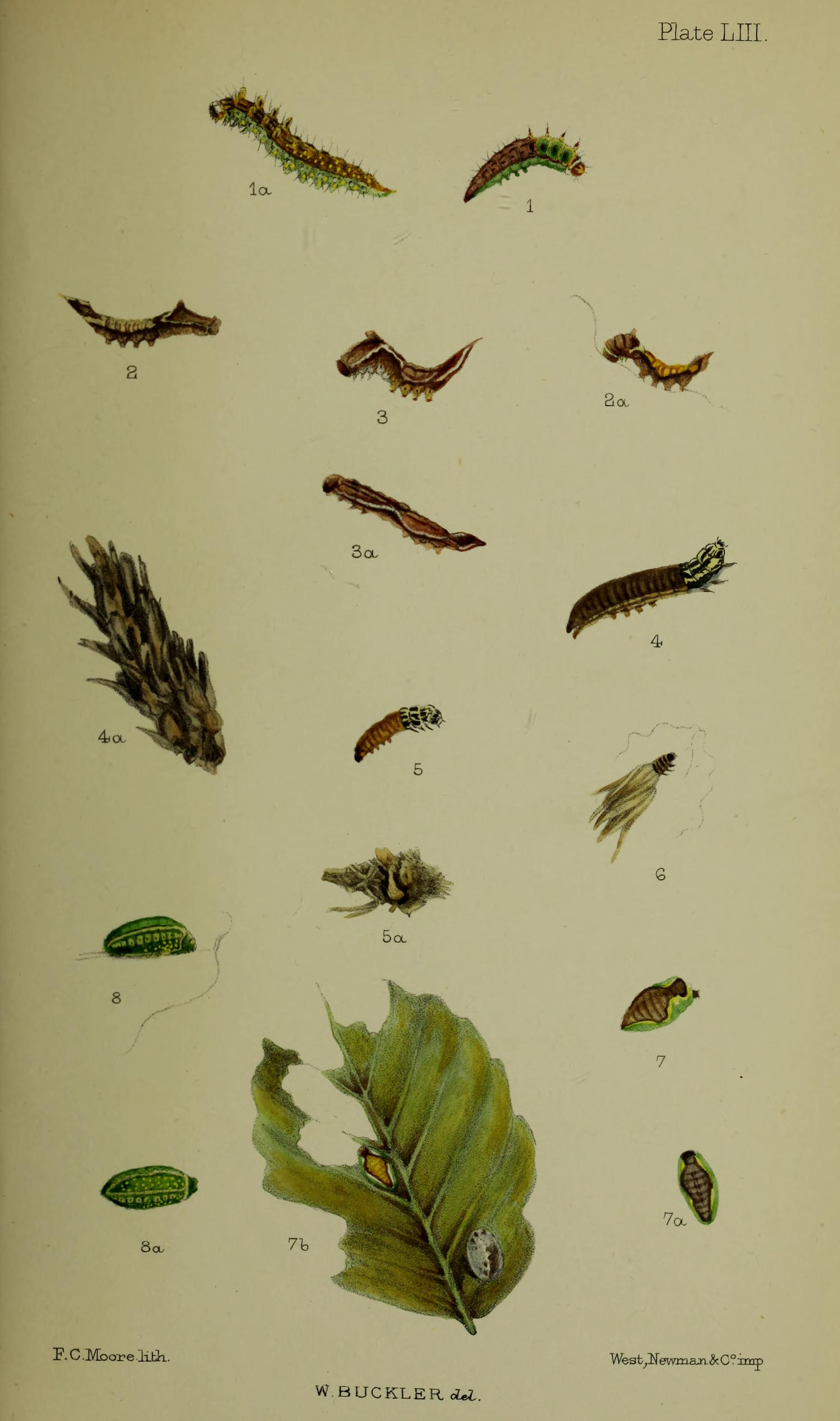
Figs, 4 larvae after last moult 4a case of larva

Larvae

The larvae feed on grass (Poaceae species), low growing plants, heather (Calluna vulgaris) and sallows (Salix species). They live in a silk case, 17 to 20 mm long which is covered longitudinally with grass stems and heather fragments (Note: The larval case of Pachythelia villosella looks similar but bigger (30 to 35 mm) and the fragments are larger.). Larva feed from August to April, some are developed and pupate, while others continue to feed and overwinter for a second year before pupating. Numbers overwintering for a second year vary according to climate.

Note

Pupa

The case is fixed on a wall, rock or fence prior to pupation from April to early June and this is when it is most easily found.

== Ecology ==
Usually females lay their eggs in the pupal case. P L Jørgensen observed some females leaving their cases and dropping to the ground a few days after mating. The female, when free from its pupal case, looks and behaves like a fly maggot. Eleven were fed to a European robin (Erithacus rubecula) and its droppings collected over the next 24 hours. After two weeks, between thirty and forty larvae hatched, constructed cases and started to feed. The observation suggests that the eggs can survive unscathed inside a bird's gut, and is an example of species dispersal.

== Distribution ==
It is found in most of Europe, except Portugal, most of the Balkan Peninsula, Ireland and Ukraine. It is considered rare in Great Britain.
