= Eugoa sexpuncta =

Scientific classification
- Kingdom: Animalia
- Phylum: Arthropoda
- Class: Insecta
- Order: Lepidoptera
- Superfamily: Noctuoidea
- Family: Erebidae
- Subfamily: Arctiinae
- Genus: Eugoa
- Species: E. sexpuncta

Binomial name
- Eugoa sexpuncta Hampson, 1911

Species of moth

Eugoa sexpuncta is a moth of the family Erebidae first described by George Hampson in 1911. It is found in Papua New Guinea.
