= Tricypha ochrea =

Scientific classification
- Kingdom: Animalia
- Phylum: Arthropoda
- Class: Insecta
- Order: Lepidoptera
- Superfamily: Noctuoidea
- Family: Erebidae
- Subfamily: Arctiinae
- Genus: Tricypha
- Species: T. ochrea

Binomial name
- Tricypha ochrea (Hampson, 1901)

Synonyms
- Micragra ochrea Hampson, 1901; Biturix ochrea (Hampson, 1901)

Species of moth

Tricypha ochrea is a moth in the subfamily Arctiinae. It was described by George Hampson in 1901. It is found in Brazil.
