= Eugoa cucullata =

Scientific classification
- Kingdom: Animalia
- Phylum: Arthropoda
- Clade: Pancrustacea
- Class: Insecta
- Order: Lepidoptera
- Superfamily: Noctuoidea
- Family: Erebidae
- Subfamily: Arctiinae
- Genus: Eugoa
- Species: E. cucullata

Binomial name
- Eugoa cucullata Holloway, 2001

Species of moth

Eugoa cucullata is a moth of the family Erebidae first described by Jeremy Daniel Holloway in 2001. It is found on Borneo. The habitat consists of various lowland forest types, including secondary forests.

The length of the forewings is 7–8 mm. The forewings are grey fasciated with dark brown. The hindwings are a bone white with a brownish tinge around the apex.
