= Tricypha furcata =

Scientific classification
- Domain: Eukaryota
- Kingdom: Animalia
- Phylum: Arthropoda
- Class: Insecta
- Order: Lepidoptera
- Superfamily: Noctuoidea
- Family: Erebidae
- Subfamily: Arctiinae
- Genus: Tricypha
- Species: T. furcata

Binomial name
- Tricypha furcata (Möschler, 1878)

Synonyms
- Maenoleneura anomala Butler, 1878

Species of moth

Tricypha furcata is a moth in the family Erebidae. It was described by Heinrich Benno Möschler in 1878. It is found in French Guiana, Suriname, Brazil and Venezuela.
