= Eugoa indeclaratana =

Scientific classification
- Kingdom: Animalia
- Phylum: Arthropoda
- Class: Insecta
- Order: Lepidoptera
- Superfamily: Noctuoidea
- Family: Erebidae
- Subfamily: Arctiinae
- Genus: Eugoa
- Species: E. indeclaratana

Binomial name
- Eugoa indeclaratana (Walker, 1863)

Synonyms
- Tospitis indeclaratana Walker, 1863

Species of moth

Eugoa indeclaratana is a moth of the family Erebidae first described by Francis Walker in 1863. It is found on Borneo. The habitat consists of lowland forests.
