= Tricypha obscura =

Scientific classification
- Kingdom: Animalia
- Phylum: Arthropoda
- Class: Insecta
- Order: Lepidoptera
- Superfamily: Noctuoidea
- Family: Erebidae
- Subfamily: Arctiinae
- Genus: Tricypha
- Species: T. obscura

Binomial name
- Tricypha obscura (Hampson, 1898)

Synonyms
- Biturix obscura (Hampson, 1898)

Species of moth

Tricypha obscura is a moth in the subfamily Arctiinae. It was described by George Hampson in 1898. It is found in Espírito Santo, Brazil.
