= Biturix pellucida =

Scientific classification
- Domain: Eukaryota
- Kingdom: Animalia
- Phylum: Arthropoda
- Class: Insecta
- Order: Lepidoptera
- Superfamily: Noctuoidea
- Family: Erebidae
- Subfamily: Arctiinae
- Genus: Biturix
- Species: B. pellucida

Binomial name
- Biturix pellucida (Sepp, [1852])

Synonyms
- Bombyx pellucida Sepp, [1852]

Species of moth

Biturix pellucida is a moth of the family Erebidae. It was described by Sepp in 1852. It is found in Mexico, Trinidad, Suriname and the Amazon region.
