= Eugoa mangle =

Scientific classification
- Kingdom: Animalia
- Phylum: Arthropoda
- Clade: Pancrustacea
- Class: Insecta
- Order: Lepidoptera
- Superfamily: Noctuoidea
- Family: Erebidae
- Subfamily: Arctiinae
- Genus: Eugoa
- Species: E. mangle

Binomial name
- Eugoa mangle Holloway, 2001

Species of moth

Eugoa mangle is a moth of the family Erebidae first described by Jeremy Daniel Holloway in 2001. It is found on Borneo. The habitat consists of mangroves.

The length of the forewings is 10–12 mm for males and 12 mm for females.
