= Eugoa crassa =

Scientific classification
- Kingdom: Animalia
- Phylum: Arthropoda
- Class: Insecta
- Order: Lepidoptera
- Superfamily: Noctuoidea
- Family: Erebidae
- Subfamily: Arctiinae
- Genus: Eugoa
- Species: E. crassa

Binomial name
- Eugoa crassa (Walker, 1862)

Synonyms
- Lyclene crassa Walker, 1862

Species of moth

Eugoa crassa is a moth of the family Erebidae first described by Francis Walker in 1862. It is found on Borneo. The habitat consists of various types of lowland forests, including limestone, wet heath forests and alluvial forests.
