= Eugoa arcuata =

Scientific classification
- Kingdom: Animalia
- Phylum: Arthropoda
- Class: Insecta
- Order: Lepidoptera
- Superfamily: Noctuoidea
- Family: Erebidae
- Subfamily: Arctiinae
- Genus: Eugoa
- Species: E. arcuata

Binomial name
- Eugoa arcuata Hampson, 1918

Species of moth

Eugoa arcuata is a moth of the family Erebidae. It is found in the Philippines.
