= Melanaema sanguinea =

Scientific classification
- Kingdom: Animalia
- Phylum: Arthropoda
- Class: Insecta
- Order: Lepidoptera
- Superfamily: Noctuoidea
- Family: Erebidae
- Subfamily: Arctiinae
- Genus: Melanaema
- Species: M. sanguinea

Binomial name
- Melanaema sanguinea Hampson, 1900

Species of moth

Melanaema sanguinea is a moth in the family Erebidae. It was described by George Hampson in 1900. It is found on New Guinea and on Fergusson Island.
