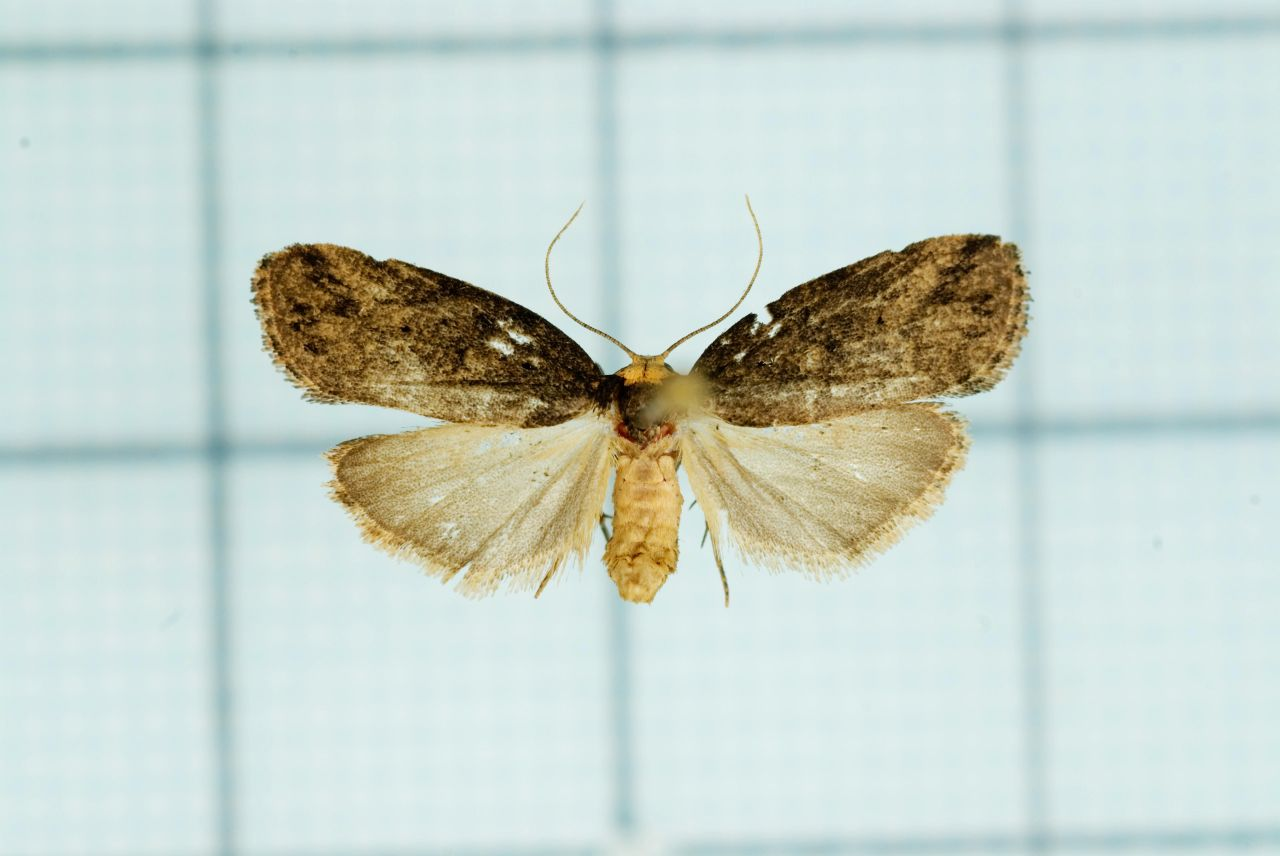

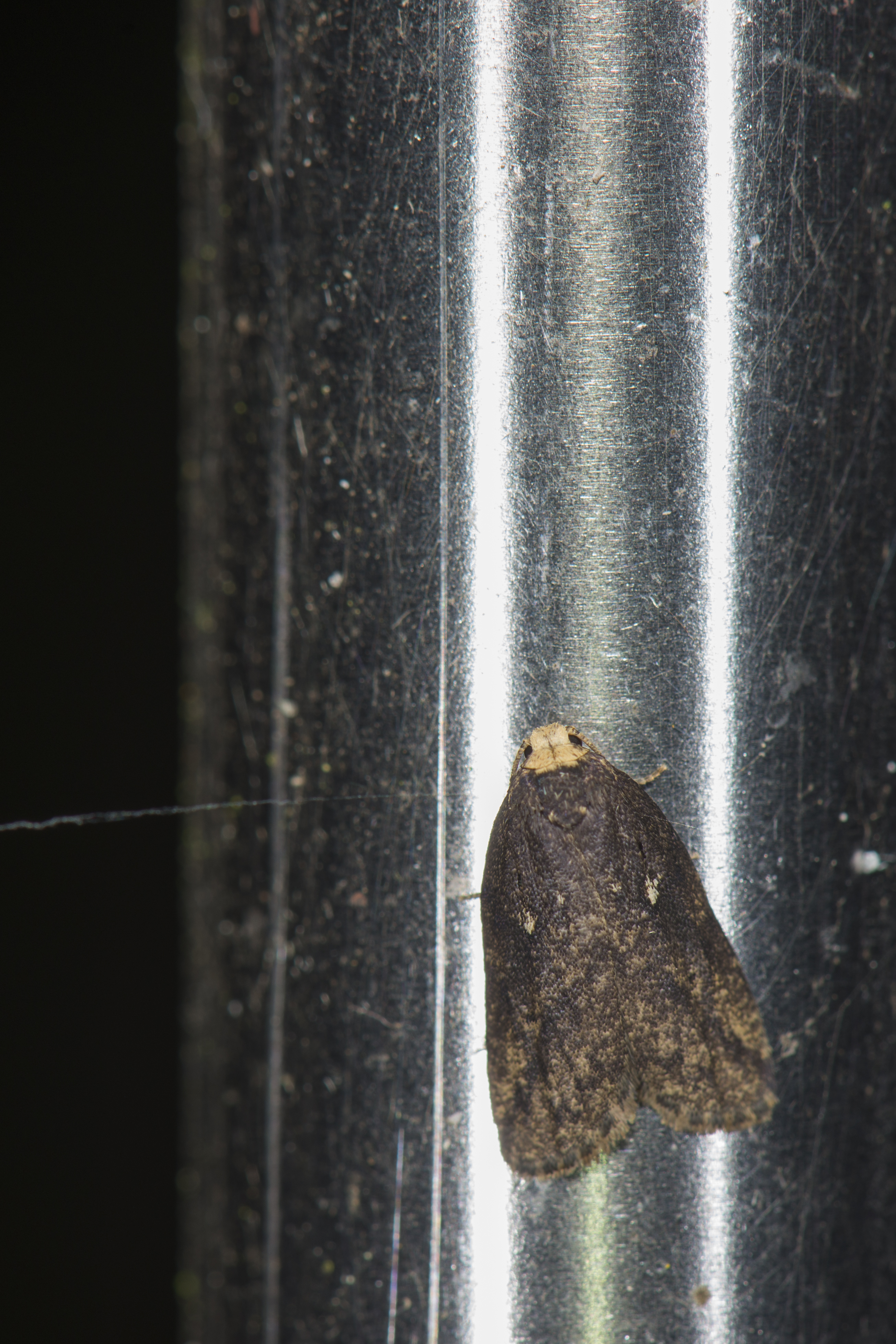

Scientific classification
- Kingdom: Animalia
- Phylum: Arthropoda
- Class: Insecta
- Order: Lepidoptera
- Superfamily: Noctuoidea
- Family: Erebidae
- Subfamily: Arctiinae
- Genus: Eugoa
- Species: E. brunnea

Binomial name
- Eugoa brunnea Hampson, 1914

= Eugoa brunnea =

Species of moth

Eugoa brunnea is a moth of the family Erebidae first described by George Hampson in 1914. It is found in China and Taiwan.
