= Eugoa clavata =

Scientific classification
- Kingdom: Animalia
- Phylum: Arthropoda
- Clade: Pancrustacea
- Class: Insecta
- Order: Lepidoptera
- Superfamily: Noctuoidea
- Family: Erebidae
- Subfamily: Arctiinae
- Genus: Eugoa
- Species: E. clavata

Binomial name
- Eugoa clavata Holloway, 2001

Species of moth

Eugoa clavata is a moth of the family Erebidae first described by Jeremy Daniel Holloway in 2001. It is found on Borneo. The habitat consists of lowland areas.

The length of the forewings is 7 mm. The forewings are dull greyish brown with a conspicuous discal dot and angled brown fasciae.
