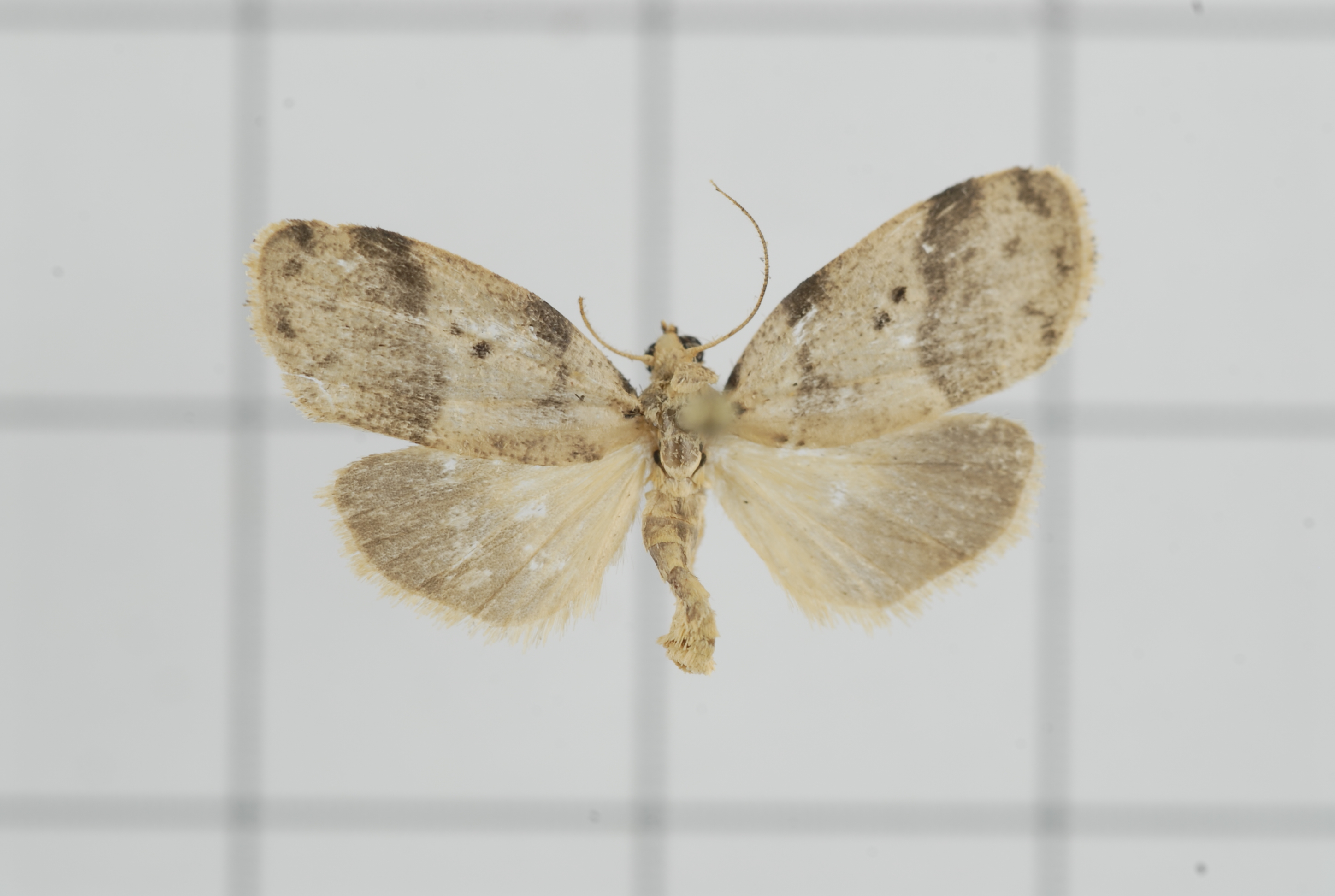

Scientific classification
- Kingdom: Animalia
- Phylum: Arthropoda
- Class: Insecta
- Order: Lepidoptera
- Superfamily: Noctuoidea
- Family: Erebidae
- Subfamily: Arctiinae
- Genus: Eugoa
- Species: E. basipuncta

Binomial name
- Eugoa basipuncta (Hampson, 1891)

Synonyms
- Padenia basipuncta Hampson, 1891; Hectogama basipuncta; Eugoa bipunctata formosicola Matsumura, 1927

= Eugoa basipuncta =

Species of moth

Eugoa basipuncta is a moth of the family Erebidae first described by George Hampson in 1891. It is found in southern India and on Java and Borneo, as well as in Taiwan, Japan, Thailand and Australia (Queensland).

The wingspan is about 20 mm.
