= Eugoa perfasciata =

Scientific classification
- Domain: Eukaryota
- Kingdom: Animalia
- Phylum: Arthropoda
- Class: Insecta
- Order: Lepidoptera
- Superfamily: Noctuoidea
- Family: Erebidae
- Subfamily: Arctiinae
- Genus: Eugoa
- Species: E. perfasciata

Binomial name
- Eugoa perfasciata Rothschild, 1913

Species of moth

Eugoa perfasciata is a moth of the family Erebidae first described by Walter Rothschild in 1913. It is found in Papua New Guinea.
