= Eugoa immunda =

Scientific classification
- Domain: Eukaryota
- Kingdom: Animalia
- Phylum: Arthropoda
- Class: Insecta
- Order: Lepidoptera
- Superfamily: Noctuoidea
- Family: Erebidae
- Subfamily: Arctiinae
- Genus: Eugoa
- Species: E. immunda

Binomial name
- Eugoa immunda C. Swinhoe, 1903

Species of moth

Eugoa immunda is a moth of the family Erebidae first described by Charles Swinhoe in 1903. It is found in Thailand.
