= Eugoa holocraspedon =

Scientific classification
- Kingdom: Animalia
- Phylum: Arthropoda
- Clade: Pancrustacea
- Class: Insecta
- Order: Lepidoptera
- Superfamily: Noctuoidea
- Family: Erebidae
- Subfamily: Arctiinae
- Genus: Eugoa
- Species: E. holocraspedon

Binomial name
- Eugoa holocraspedon Holloway, 2001

Species of moth

Eugoa holocraspedon is a moth of the family Erebidae first described by Jeremy Daniel Holloway in 2001. It is found on Borneo. The habitat consists of heath, swamp and coastal forests.

The length of the forewings is 9–10 mm (0.35–0.39 in). The forewings are fawn with dark brown speckling.
