= Eugoa gemina =

Scientific classification
- Kingdom: Animalia
- Phylum: Arthropoda
- Class: Insecta
- Order: Lepidoptera
- Superfamily: Noctuoidea
- Family: Erebidae
- Subfamily: Arctiinae
- Genus: Eugoa
- Species: E. gemina

Binomial name
- Eugoa gemina Hampson, 1914

Species of moth

Eugoa gemina is a moth of the family Erebidae. It is found in Ghana.
