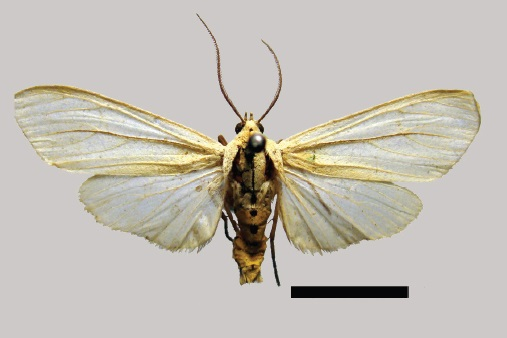

Scientific classification
- Kingdom: Animalia
- Phylum: Arthropoda
- Class: Insecta
- Order: Lepidoptera
- Superfamily: Noctuoidea
- Family: Erebidae
- Subfamily: Arctiinae
- Genus: Biturix
- Species: B. rectilinea

Binomial name
- Biturix rectilinea (Burmeister, 1878)

Synonyms
- Halysidota rectilinea Burmeister, 1878; Agoraea rectilinea

= Biturix rectilinea =

Species of moth

Biturix rectilinea is a moth of the family Erebidae. It was described by Hermann Burmeister in 1878. It is found in Brazil, Argentina and Bolivia.
