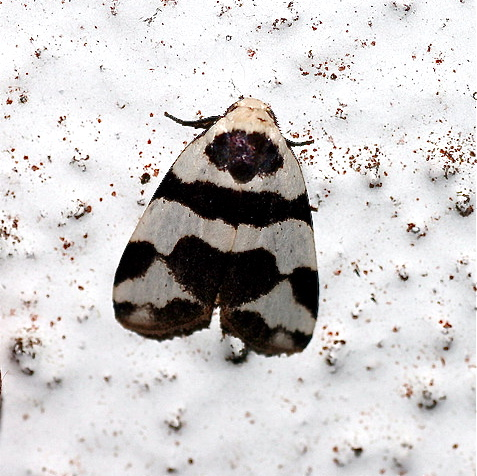

Scientific classification
- Kingdom: Animalia
- Phylum: Arthropoda
- Class: Insecta
- Order: Lepidoptera
- Superfamily: Noctuoidea
- Family: Erebidae
- Subfamily: Arctiinae
- Genus: Eugoa
- Species: E. trifascia

Binomial name
- Eugoa trifascia (Walker, 1862)

Synonyms
- Lyclene trifascia Walker, 1862; Eugoa similis Rothschild, 1913

= Eugoa trifascia =

Species of moth

Eugoa trifascia is a lichen moth in the family Erebidae, subfamily Arctiinae. The species was first described by Francis Walker in 1862. It is found on Peninsular Malaysia and Borneo. The habitat consists of lowland to lower montane forests.
