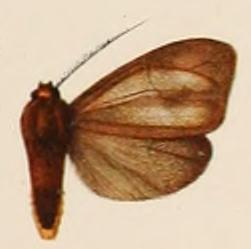

Scientific classification
- Domain: Eukaryota
- Kingdom: Animalia
- Phylum: Arthropoda
- Class: Insecta
- Order: Lepidoptera
- Superfamily: Noctuoidea
- Family: Erebidae
- Subfamily: Arctiinae
- Genus: Tricypha
- Species: T. nigrescens

Binomial name
- Tricypha nigrescens Rothschild, 1909

= Tricypha nigrescens =

Species of moth

Tricypha nigrescens is a moth of the subfamily Arctiinae first described by Rothschild in 1909. It is found in French Guiana, Brazil and Paraguay.
