= Eugoa hampsoni =

Scientific classification
- Kingdom: Animalia
- Phylum: Arthropoda
- Clade: Pancrustacea
- Class: Insecta
- Order: Lepidoptera
- Superfamily: Noctuoidea
- Family: Erebidae
- Subfamily: Arctiinae
- Genus: Eugoa
- Species: E. hampsoni

Binomial name
- Eugoa hampsoni Holloway, 2001

Synonyms
- Eugoa obscura Hampson, 1900 (preocc.); Eugoa obscura var. formosibia Strand, 1917

Species of moth

Eugoa hampsoni is a moth of the family Erebidae first described by Jeremy Daniel Holloway in 2001. It is found on Borneo.
