= Eugoa nata =

Scientific classification
- Kingdom: Animalia
- Phylum: Arthropoda
- Clade: Pancrustacea
- Class: Insecta
- Order: Lepidoptera
- Superfamily: Noctuoidea
- Family: Erebidae
- Subfamily: Arctiinae
- Genus: Eugoa
- Species: E. nata

Binomial name
- Eugoa nata Dubatolov & Bucsek, 2013

Species of moth

Eugoa nata is a moth of the family Erebidae. It is found in Cambodia.
