= Eugoa bacchi =

Scientific classification
- Kingdom: Animalia
- Phylum: Arthropoda
- Clade: Pancrustacea
- Class: Insecta
- Order: Lepidoptera
- Superfamily: Noctuoidea
- Family: Erebidae
- Subfamily: Arctiinae
- Genus: Eugoa
- Species: E. bacchi

Binomial name
- Eugoa bacchi Holloway, 2001

Species of moth

Eugoa bacchi is a moth of the family Erebidae first described by Jeremy Daniel Holloway in 2001. It is found on Borneo. The habitat consists of forests, including coastal forests.

The length of the forewings is 8–9 mm.
