= Wattle bagworm =

Scientific classification
- Kingdom: Animalia
- Phylum: Arthropoda
- Class: Insecta
- Order: Lepidoptera
- Family: Psychidae
- Subfamily: Oiketicinae
- Tribe: Acanthopsychini
- Genus: Kotochalia
- Species: K. junodi

Binomial name
- Kotochalia junodi (Heylaerts, 1890)

Synonyms
- Acanthopsyche junodi

Species of moth

The wattle bagworm (Kotochalia junodi, formerly Acanthopsyche junodi) is a species of moth in the family Psychidae. In southern Africa it is a pest of the black wattle (Acacia mearnsii) which is grown largely as a source of vegetable tannin. Kotochalia junodi is indigenous to Southern Africa, where it originally fed on indigenous relatives of the wattle.

Like all members of the family Psychidae, the male larva develops into an adult in a mobile silken bag covered with materials such as thorns and twigs. Only once it is mature does it leave the bag to mate. The female never leaves her bag.

In spring the eggs hatch in the bag in which the adult female had grown. Because the female never leaves the tree in which she grew and died, the insects need some other way to move to new trees or in general to disperse, and in fact the newly hatched (first-instar) larva is the dispersive stage of the wattle bagworm life cycle. The larva spins a silken thread on which it may float along on the breeze, much as some species of young spiderlings use gossamer for ballooning in their dispersive phase. Also, birds and probably other agencies may carry some larvae to suitable feeding sites. The young caterpillar does not feed for a day or two after hatching, but eventually, once the dispersive phase is completed, it begins to weave a conical bag of silk, incorporating fragments of plant material such as leaves, twigs and bark.

The thorns and twigs covering the cocoon provide protection against enemies such as mantids. They also serve as camouflage that matches the tree from which the larva had stripped them. As it feeds and grows, it extends the size of the bag until it reaches some 55 mm in length and 18 mm in width and its outline becomes oval. The caterpillar hooks its anal prolegs into the silken lining of the bag. As it feeds and grows, the larva drags the bag wherever it goes until it is full grown and pupates. If alarmed, it shuts the opening by pulling in the slack in front.

About February or March the larva is fully grown. It stops feeding, fastens its bag to the tree, and spins an inner lining within which it pupates. The males pupate in April or May and the females perhaps a month later. The winged male emerges from its cocoon some time between August and October. The male does not feed after emerging, and lives for only a few days. It has wings almost clear of scales and flies strongly, seeking out a mature female to inseminate. The female in contrast, remains in her bag after emerging from the pupa. She is a highly specialised, worm-like creature: she has no wings at all, and lacks legs and even eyes; she lies helpless in her shelter, only able to turn her posterior towards the opening of her bag for insemination, and away from the opening for oviposition. The male inserts the point of his abdomen through the neck of the bag and inseminates her. Oviposition starts immediately afterwards, sometimes even before insemination, and in mid- or late winter successful females produces on average about 1600 eggs. They remain in the bag together with the shrunken remains of the mother, hatching about two months later.

This relatively large clutch size reflects the fact that on average only a few of the larvae survive to reproduce.

The large number of eggs is at least in part an adaptation to the female's inability to fly and the compensatory strategy for dispersion of the newly hatched larvae; wattle bagworm larvae rely on an unusual mode of transport. After hatching as a caterpillar, the insect spins a silk thread and hangs from the end for a few days. The wind or a passing bird sometimes transports the caterpillar to another tree, spreading the species quite effectively, if inefficiently. Given the large number of eggs, there is a reasonable chance that at least some of them will find adventitious transport. The rest either starve, or settle down in the tree where they hatched which is likely to die from defoliation within a few seasons if natural or artificial controls do not prevent it.

The wattle bagworm has many natural enemies. They include parasitic wasps, flies and beetles, and various predators, such as spiders and birds, not to mention fungal diseases such as Entomophthora and Isaria species, bacterial diseases such as Bacillus thuringiensis, and polyhedral virus diseases. Attempts to use such a virus for bagworm control during the 1950s gave results too inconsistent to be satisfactory at the time.

In the wild probably the most important insect enemy of Kotochalia junodi is an interesting parasitoid wasp, a member of the Ichneumonidae, Sericopimpla sericata. In colour the wasp is largely black, yellowish, and red. The female wasp is about 12 mm in length, and like many Ichneumonids she has a protruding ovipositor almost as long as her gaster.

A surprising feature of Sericopimpla sericata habits is that the adult kills bagworms in two ways. In either case it stings them with the ovipositor. The bagworm wriggles and contorts within the bag to avoid attack, but as a rule the female wasp succeeds in stinging it sooner or later. In some cases the female then proceeds to eat the prey herself. The sting paralyses the victim, and the wasp bites a hole in the bag and feeds through it. Such predatory feeding by parasitoids is very unusual. No doubt the female needs the plentiful fat and protein of the victim to produce eggs, much as many blood-sucking female insects need a blood meal before they can lay eggs.

An adequately nourished female will parasitise the bagworm with several stings, perhaps dozens. Paralysed hosts remain fresh for months, long enough for the wasp larvae.

The bagworm routinely infests the large local wattle plantations, which cover more than half a million acres (2,000 km^{2}) in South Africa, primarily in Natal. Natural control of the bagworm is variable, but good enough that the use of the most dangerous insecticides has effectively been discontinued. Nowadays the policy is to spray only heavy infestations, and only at strategic times. In the mid-20th century chlorinated hydrocarbon insecticides such as toxaphene and endrin were the treatments of choice for control of wattle bagworm infestations, but since then the preference has shifted to the bacterial insecticide BTK. For small infestations or localized impact, "manual control"—simply picking bags from the trees—may be satisfactory.
