= Eugoa ellipsis =

Scientific classification
- Domain: Eukaryota
- Kingdom: Animalia
- Phylum: Arthropoda
- Class: Insecta
- Order: Lepidoptera
- Superfamily: Noctuoidea
- Family: Erebidae
- Subfamily: Arctiinae
- Genus: Eugoa
- Species: E. ellipsis

Binomial name
- Eugoa ellipsis Bucsek, 2008

Species of moth

Eugoa ellipsis is a moth of the family Erebidae. It is found in western Malaysia. The species is named for the elliptical shape on their wings.

== Physical attributes ==
The males of Eugoa ellipsis have a wingspan of 14-15 millimeters. They have a pale brown forewing and weakly mottled dark brown color at the apex. Their wings have an almost elliptical black spot and the hindwings are a pale yellow. The females have a slightly smaller wingspans and solid pale brown colouring on their hindwings.
