= Eugoa tricolora =

Scientific classification
- Kingdom: Animalia
- Phylum: Arthropoda
- Clade: Pancrustacea
- Class: Insecta
- Order: Lepidoptera
- Superfamily: Noctuoidea
- Family: Erebidae
- Subfamily: Arctiinae
- Genus: Eugoa
- Species: E. tricolora

Binomial name
- Eugoa tricolora Bethune-Baker, 1904

Species of moth

Eugoa tricolora is a moth of the family Erebidae first described by George Thomas Bethune-Baker in 1904. It is found in New Guinea.
