= Eugoa submontana =

Scientific classification
- Kingdom: Animalia
- Phylum: Arthropoda
- Clade: Pancrustacea
- Class: Insecta
- Order: Lepidoptera
- Superfamily: Noctuoidea
- Family: Erebidae
- Subfamily: Arctiinae
- Genus: Eugoa
- Species: E. submontana

Binomial name
- Eugoa submontana Holloway, 2001

Species of moth

Eugoa submontana is a moth of the family Erebidae first described by Jeremy Daniel Holloway in 2001. It is found on Borneo. The habitat consists of lower montane forests.

The length of the forewings is 10–11 mm. Both the forewings and hindwings are grey, the latter paler with a pale yellowish tinge.
