= Eugoa tridens =

Scientific classification
- Domain: Eukaryota
- Kingdom: Animalia
- Phylum: Arthropoda
- Class: Insecta
- Order: Lepidoptera
- Superfamily: Noctuoidea
- Family: Erebidae
- Subfamily: Arctiinae
- Genus: Eugoa
- Species: E. tridens

Binomial name
- Eugoa tridens Bucsek, 2008

Species of moth

Eugoa tridens is a moth of the family Erebidae. It is found in western Malaysia.
