= Eugoa tropicalis =

Scientific classification
- Domain: Eukaryota
- Kingdom: Animalia
- Phylum: Arthropoda
- Class: Insecta
- Order: Lepidoptera
- Superfamily: Noctuoidea
- Family: Erebidae
- Subfamily: Arctiinae
- Genus: Eugoa
- Species: E. tropicalis

Binomial name
- Eugoa tropicalis Holland, 1893

Species of moth

Eugoa tropicalis is a moth of the family Erebidae. It is found in Gabon.
