= Eugoa uniformis =

Scientific classification
- Kingdom: Animalia
- Phylum: Arthropoda
- Clade: Pancrustacea
- Class: Insecta
- Order: Lepidoptera
- Superfamily: Noctuoidea
- Family: Erebidae
- Subfamily: Arctiinae
- Genus: Eugoa
- Species: E. uniformis

Binomial name
- Eugoa uniformis Holloway, 2001

Species of moth

Eugoa uniformis is a moth of the family Erebidae first described by Jeremy Daniel Holloway in 2001. It is found on Borneo. The habitat consists of lowland forests, including secondary forests.

The length of the forewings is 7–8 mm (0.28–0.31 in). The forewings are speckled brown and the hindwings are greyish brown in both sexes.
