= Eugoa trifasciella =

Scientific classification
- Domain: Eukaryota
- Kingdom: Animalia
- Phylum: Arthropoda
- Class: Insecta
- Order: Lepidoptera
- Superfamily: Noctuoidea
- Family: Erebidae
- Subfamily: Arctiinae
- Genus: Eugoa
- Species: E. trifasciella

Binomial name
- Eugoa trifasciella Strand, 1922

Synonyms
- Eugoa trifasciella Strand, 1922; Padenia trifasciata Moore, [1887] (preocc.)

Species of moth

Eugoa trifasciella is a moth of the family Erebidae. It is found in Sri Lanka.

== Description ==
Head, thorax and abdomen greyish or brownish fuscous. Thorax spotted with black. Forewings greyish, irrorated with fuscous and a black spot at base. There is a slightly diffused angled antemedial band which are narrower. Two obliquely placed black spots at end of cell. Forewings with veins 4 and 5 stalked and vein 11 anastomosing with vein 12. Hindwings pale ochreous suffused with fuscous. Hindwings without vein 5.
