= Eugoa trilacunata =

Scientific classification
- Kingdom: Animalia
- Phylum: Arthropoda
- Clade: Pancrustacea
- Class: Insecta
- Order: Lepidoptera
- Superfamily: Noctuoidea
- Family: Erebidae
- Subfamily: Arctiinae
- Genus: Eugoa
- Species: E. trilacunata

Binomial name
- Eugoa trilacunata Holloway, 2001

Species of moth

Eugoa trilacunata is a moth of the family Erebidae first described by Jeremy Daniel Holloway in 2001. It is found on Borneo. The habitat ranges from lowland areas to the upper montane zone.

The length of the forewings is 9–12 mm for males and 9–11 mm for females.
