= Eugoa dissozona =

Scientific classification
- Kingdom: Animalia
- Phylum: Arthropoda
- Class: Insecta
- Order: Lepidoptera
- Superfamily: Noctuoidea
- Family: Erebidae
- Subfamily: Arctiinae
- Genus: Eugoa
- Species: E. dissozona

Binomial name
- Eugoa dissozona (Meyrick, 1889)

Synonyms
- Hectogama dissozona Meyrick, 1889; Eugoa transfasciata Rothschild, 1912

Species of moth

Eugoa dissozona is a moth of the family Erebidae first described by Edward Meyrick in 1889 (as Hectogama dissozona). It is found on New Guinea, where it is a common and widely distributed species. Specimens resemble those of Eugoa regalis. In his original description of the species, Meyrick gave a wingspan of 24 mm.
