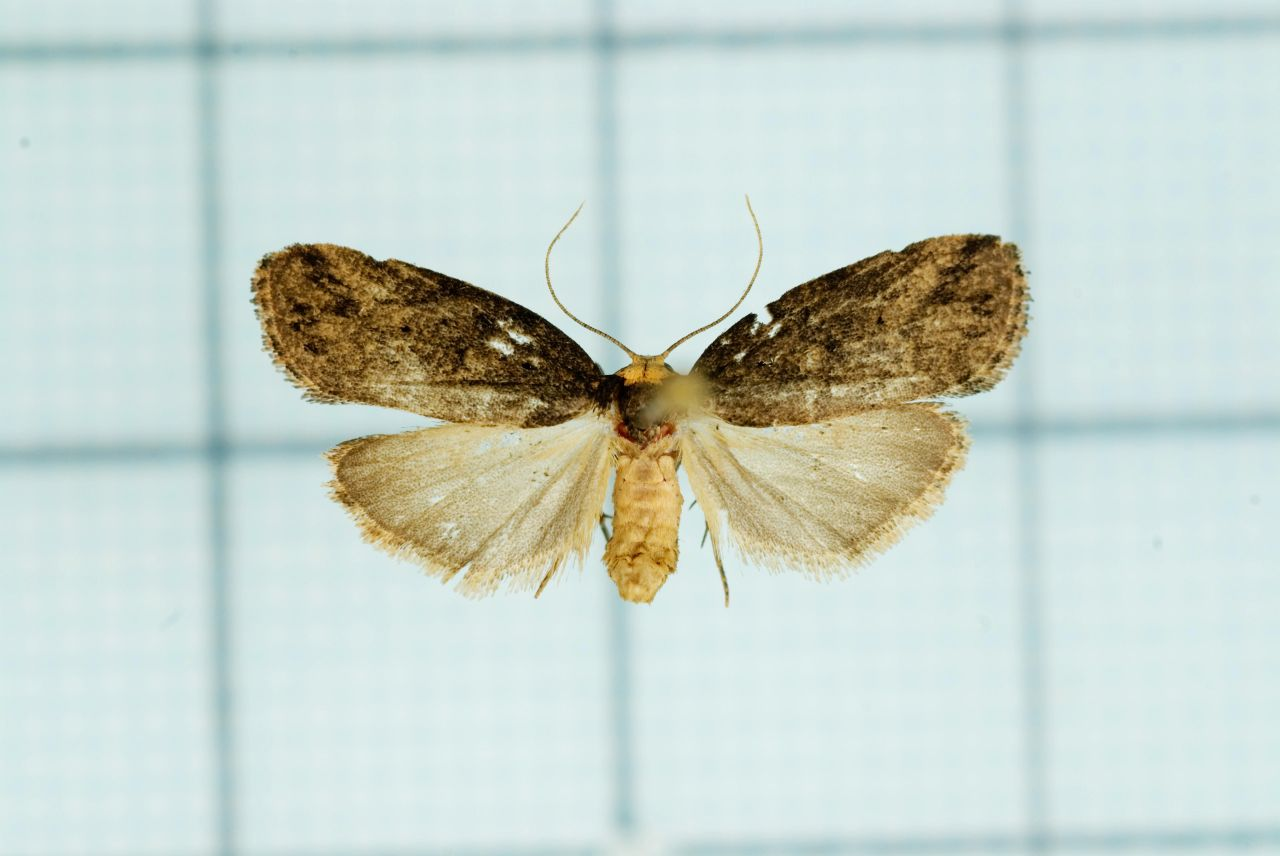
- Eugoa brunnea

Scientific classification
- Kingdom: Animalia
- Phylum: Arthropoda
- Class: Insecta
- Order: Lepidoptera
- Superfamily: Noctuoidea
- Family: Erebidae
- Subfamily: Arctiinae
- Tribe: Lithosiini
- Genus: Eugoa; Walker, 1858

Synonyms
- Hectogama Meyrick, 1889

= Eugoa =

Genus of moths

Eugoa is a genus in the family Erebidae, subfamily Arctiinae. The genus was erected by Francis Walker in 1858. They are found in India, Sri Lanka, Myanmar and Borneo.

== Description ==
Its palpi are porrect (extending forward) and reach beyond the frons. Antennae of male minutely ciliated. Forewings with veins 6, 7 and 8, 9 stalked. Hindwings with stalked veins 6 and 7 where the vein 8 from middle of cell.

== Species ==
- aequalis species group
  - Eugoa aequalis
  - Eugoa gabrielae
  - Eugoa trilacunata
- aridoides species group
  - Eugoa aliquotpunctata
  - Eugoa apexinigra
  - Eugoa aridoides
  - Eugoa bidentata
  - Eugoa ellipsis
  - Eugoa gracilisa
  - Eugoa grandipuncta
  - Eugoa hectogamoides
  - Eugoa nata
  - Eugoa tridens
- bipunctalis species group
  - Eugoa alleni
  - Eugoa bipunctalis
  - Eugoa mangle
- bipunctata species group
  - Eugoa bipunctata
- crassa species group
  - Eugoa alticrassa
  - Eugoa crassa
- holocraspedon species group
  - Eugoa cesaneki
  - Eugoa holocraspedon
- humerana species group
  - Eugoa humerana
- inconspicua species group
  - Eugoa bipuncta
  - Eugoa inconspicua
  - Eugoa muluana
- indeclaratana species group
  - Eugoa apiensis
  - Eugoa indeclaratana
  - Eugoa uniformis
- obliquipuncta species group
  - Eugoa obliquipuncta
- okalii species group
  - Eugoa okalii
- palawanica species group
  - Eugoa palawanica
- parva species group
  - Eugoa parva
- pectinicrassa species group
  - Eugoa pectinicrassa
- simonae species group
  - Eugoa simonae
- submontana species group
  - Eugoa submontana
- tessellata species group
  - Eugoa tessellata
- trifasciata species group
  - Eugoa khmera
  - Eugoa malayicola
  - Eugoa pulchra
  - Eugoa trifasciata
- turbida species group
  - Eugoa turbida
- unicolora species group
  - Eugoa unicolora
- vagigutta species group
  - Eugoa vagigutta
- other species
  - Eugoa africana
  - Eugoa arcuata
  - Eugoa arida
  - Eugoa bacchi
  - Eugoa basipuncta

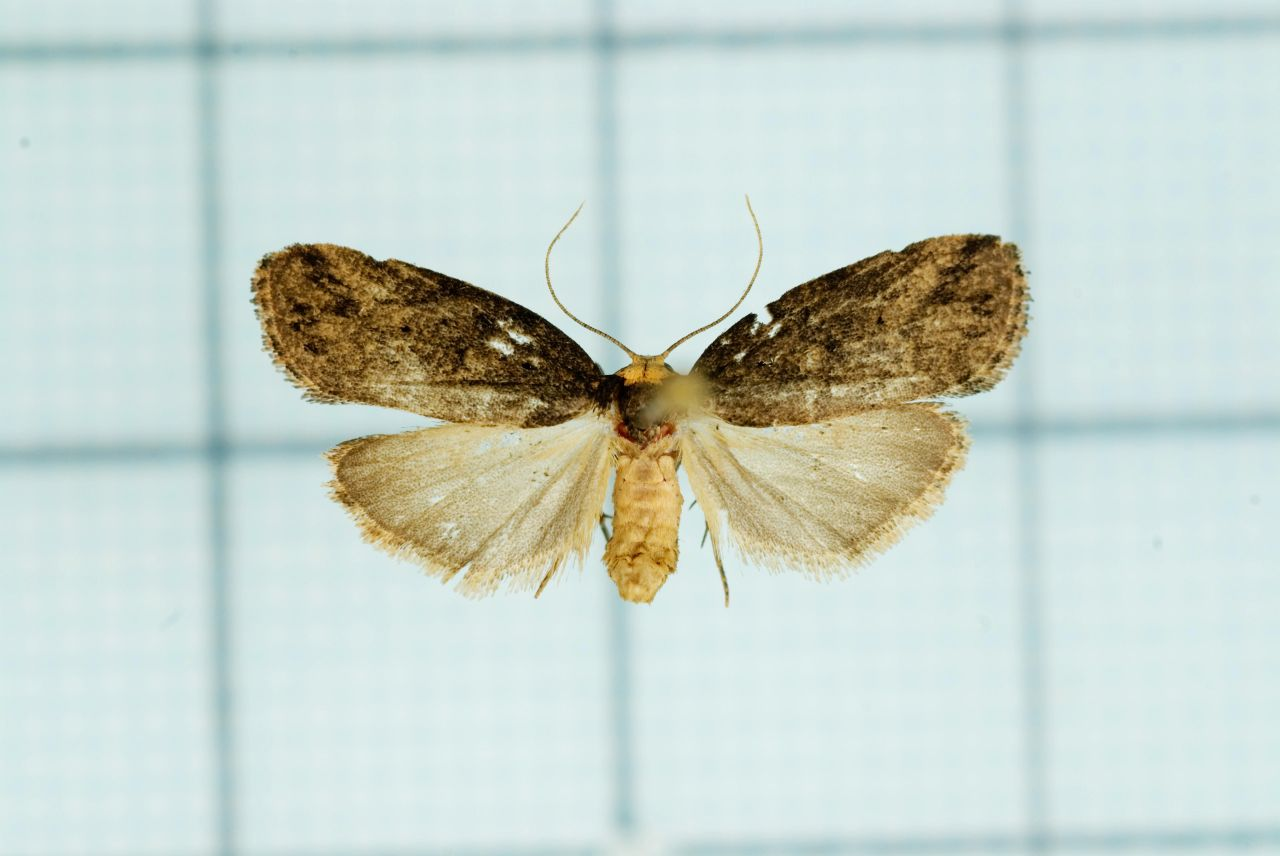
Eugoa brunnea

  - Eugoa brunnea
  - Eugoa clavata
  - Eugoa conflua
  - Eugoa corniculata Kühne, 2007
  - Eugoa coronaria Kühne, 2007
  - Eugoa costiplaga
  - Eugoa cucullata
  - Eugoa dissozona
  - Eugoa eeckei
  - Eugoa euryphaea
  - Eugoa fasciata
  - Eugoa gemina
  - Eugoa grisea
  - Eugoa hampsoni
  - Eugoa immunda
  - Eugoa incerta
  - Eugoa mindanensis
  - Eugoa perfasciata
  - Eugoa pulverosa
  - Eugoa quadriplagiata
  - Eugoa rufibasis
  - Eugoa sexpuncta
  - Eugoa sinuata
  - Eugoa sordida
  - Eugoa tineoides
  - Eugoa tricolora
  - Eugoa trifascia
  - Eugoa trifasciata
  - Eugoa trifasciella
  - Eugoa tropicalis
  - Eugoa vasta
  - Eugoa winneba Kühne, 2007
