= Eugoa bipunctalis =

Scientific classification
- Domain: Eukaryota
- Kingdom: Animalia
- Phylum: Arthropoda
- Class: Insecta
- Order: Lepidoptera
- Superfamily: Noctuoidea
- Family: Erebidae
- Subfamily: Arctiinae
- Genus: Eugoa
- Species: E. bipunctalis

Binomial name
- Eugoa bipunctalis van Eecke, 1926

Species of moth

Eugoa bipunctalis is a moth of the family Erebidae first described by van Eecke in 1926. It is found on Sumatra, Java and Borneo. The habitat consists of lowland dipterocarp forests and lower montane forests.
