= Eugoa trifasciata =

Scientific classification
- Kingdom: Animalia
- Phylum: Arthropoda
- Class: Insecta
- Order: Lepidoptera
- Superfamily: Noctuoidea
- Family: Erebidae
- Subfamily: Arctiinae
- Genus: Eugoa
- Species: E. trifasciata

Binomial name
- Eugoa trifasciata (Snellen, 1880)

Synonyms
- Lithosia trifasciata Snellen, 1880; Eugoa trifaciata

Species of moth

Eugoa trifasciata is a moth of the family Erebidae, subfamily Arctiinae. The species was first described by Snellen in 1880. It is found on Sumatra and Borneo. It is found in a wide range of lowland forest habitats, including heath forests and regenerating alluvial forests.
