= Biturix intactus =

Scientific classification
- Kingdom: Animalia
- Phylum: Arthropoda
- Class: Insecta
- Order: Lepidoptera
- Superfamily: Noctuoidea
- Family: Erebidae
- Subfamily: Arctiinae
- Genus: Biturix
- Species: B. intactus

Binomial name
- Biturix intactus (Walker, 1855)

Species of moth

Biturix intactus is a moth of the family Erebidae. It was described by Francis Walker in 1855. It is found in Venezuela.
