= Eugoa tessellata =

Scientific classification
- Kingdom: Animalia
- Phylum: Arthropoda
- Clade: Pancrustacea
- Class: Insecta
- Order: Lepidoptera
- Superfamily: Noctuoidea
- Family: Erebidae
- Subfamily: Arctiinae
- Genus: Eugoa
- Species: E. tessellata

Binomial name
- Eugoa tessellata Holloway, 2001

Species of moth

Eugoa tessellata is a moth of the family Erebidae first described by Jeremy Daniel Holloway in 2001. It is found on Borneo. The habitat consists of lowland forests.

The length of the forewings is 11 mm. Both the forewings and hindwings are pale creamy fawn.
