= Eugoa vagigutta =

Scientific classification
- Kingdom: Animalia
- Phylum: Arthropoda
- Class: Insecta
- Order: Lepidoptera
- Superfamily: Noctuoidea
- Family: Erebidae
- Subfamily: Arctiinae
- Genus: Eugoa
- Species: E. vagigutta

Binomial name
- Eugoa vagigutta (Walker, 1862)

Synonyms
- Lyclene vagigutta Walker, 1862

Species of moth

Eugoa vagigutta is a moth of the family Erebidae first described by Francis Walker in 1862. It is found on Borneo. The habitat consists of alluvial forests, forest on limestone, lowland dipterocarp forests and open coastal forests.
