= Eugoa arida =

Scientific classification
- Domain: Eukaryota
- Kingdom: Animalia
- Phylum: Arthropoda
- Class: Insecta
- Order: Lepidoptera
- Superfamily: Noctuoidea
- Family: Erebidae
- Subfamily: Arctiinae
- Genus: Eugoa
- Species: E. arida

Binomial name
- Eugoa arida van Eecke, 1920

Species of moth

Eugoa arida is a moth of the family Erebidae. It is found on Java.
