= Eugoa obliquipuncta =

Scientific classification
- Kingdom: Animalia
- Phylum: Arthropoda
- Clade: Pancrustacea
- Class: Insecta
- Order: Lepidoptera
- Superfamily: Noctuoidea
- Family: Erebidae
- Subfamily: Arctiinae
- Genus: Eugoa
- Species: E. obliquipuncta

Binomial name
- Eugoa obliquipuncta Holloway, 2001

Species of moth

Eugoa obliquipuncta is a moth of the family Erebidae first described by Jeremy Daniel Holloway in 2001. It is found on Borneo. The habitat consists of various lowland forest types, including heath forests and secondary forests.

The length of the forewings is 8–9 mm.
