= Biturix diversipes =

Scientific classification
- Kingdom: Animalia
- Phylum: Arthropoda
- Class: Insecta
- Order: Lepidoptera
- Superfamily: Noctuoidea
- Family: Erebidae
- Subfamily: Arctiinae
- Genus: Biturix
- Species: B. diversipes

Binomial name
- Biturix diversipes Walker, 1855

Synonyms
- Halisidota rhodogaster Snellen, 1887

Species of moth

Biturix diversipes is a moth of the family Erebidae. It was described by Francis Walker in 1855. It is found in Venezuela.
