= Eugoa inconspicua =

Scientific classification
- Kingdom: Animalia
- Phylum: Arthropoda
- Class: Insecta
- Order: Lepidoptera
- Superfamily: Noctuoidea
- Family: Erebidae
- Subfamily: Arctiinae
- Genus: Eugoa
- Species: E. inconspicua

Binomial name
- Eugoa inconspicua (Walker, 1863)

Synonyms
- Tospitis inconspicua Walker, 1863

Species of moth

Eugoa inconspicua is a moth of the family Erebidae first described by Francis Walker in 1863. It is found on Borneo. The habitat consists of various lowland areas, including alluvial forests, wet heath forests and swamp forests.
