= Biturix venosata =

Scientific classification
- Kingdom: Animalia
- Phylum: Arthropoda
- Clade: Pancrustacea
- Class: Insecta
- Order: Lepidoptera
- Superfamily: Noctuoidea
- Family: Erebidae
- Subfamily: Arctiinae
- Genus: Biturix
- Species: B. venosata

Binomial name
- Biturix venosata Walker, [1865]

Species of moth

Biturix venosata is a moth of the family Erebidae. It was described by Francis Walker in 1865. It is found in Mexico, Panama, Costa Rica and southern Texas.
