= Eugoa hainanensis =

Scientific classification
- Kingdom: Animalia
- Phylum: Arthropoda
- Clade: Pancrustacea
- Class: Insecta
- Order: Lepidoptera
- Superfamily: Noctuoidea
- Family: Erebidae
- Subfamily: Arctiinae
- Genus: Eugoa
- Species: E. hainanensis

Binomial name
- Eugoa hainanensis Fang, 2000

Synonyms
- Eugoa simonae Buscek, 2008

Species of moth

Eugoa hainanensis is an Asian moth species of the family Erebidae, first described in 2000 by C. Fang. It is closely related to Eugoa dubatolovi and Eugoa sinxayi.

== Distribution ==
Eugoa hainanensis is known from India, Nepal, south-east China, Cambodia, Laos and Thailand.

== Description ==
In his 2008 description of Eugoa simonae, which has since been synonymized with Eugoa hainanensis, Karol Bucsek noted the forewings as pale grey in ground color with faint brown mottling, marked with dark brown bands, a dark brown spot on the wing's leading edge near the base, and two black dots in the discal area. He described the hindwings as pale yellow with brown mottling, more so in female specimens than male, the antennae as pectinate in males and filiform in females, and gave a wingspan of respectively 18 and 19 mm for male and female specimens.
