= Eugoa quadriplagiata =

Scientific classification
- Domain: Eukaryota
- Kingdom: Animalia
- Phylum: Arthropoda
- Class: Insecta
- Order: Lepidoptera
- Superfamily: Noctuoidea
- Family: Erebidae
- Subfamily: Arctiinae
- Genus: Eugoa
- Species: E. quadriplagiata

Binomial name
- Eugoa quadriplagiata Rothschild, 1915

Species of moth

Eugoa quadriplagiata is a moth of the family Erebidae first described by Walter Rothschild in 1915. It is found in Papua New Guinea.
