= Eugoa alticrassa =

Scientific classification
- Kingdom: Animalia
- Phylum: Arthropoda
- Clade: Pancrustacea
- Class: Insecta
- Order: Lepidoptera
- Superfamily: Noctuoidea
- Family: Erebidae
- Subfamily: Arctiinae
- Genus: Eugoa
- Species: E. alticrassa

Binomial name
- Eugoa alticrassa Holloway, 2001

Species of moth

Eugoa alticrassa is a moth of the family Erebidae first described by Jeremy Daniel Holloway in 2001. It is found on Borneo. The habitat consists of upper montane forests and dry heath forests.

The length of the forewings is 8–10 mm.
