= Eugoa aridoides =

Scientific classification
- Kingdom: Animalia
- Phylum: Arthropoda
- Clade: Pancrustacea
- Class: Insecta
- Order: Lepidoptera
- Superfamily: Noctuoidea
- Family: Erebidae
- Subfamily: Arctiinae
- Genus: Eugoa
- Species: E. aridoides

Binomial name
- Eugoa aridoides Holloway, 2001

Species of moth

Eugoa aridoides is a moth of the family Erebidae first described by Jeremy Daniel Holloway in 2001. It is found on Borneo. The habitat consists of lowland forests.

The length of the forewings is 7–8 mm.
