= Eugoa turbida =

Scientific classification
- Kingdom: Animalia
- Phylum: Arthropoda
- Class: Insecta
- Order: Lepidoptera
- Superfamily: Noctuoidea
- Family: Erebidae
- Subfamily: Arctiinae
- Genus: Eugoa
- Species: E. turbida

Binomial name
- Eugoa turbida (Walker, 1862)

Synonyms
- Lyclene turbida Walker, 1862; Lyclene strigicosta Walker, 1862

Species of moth

Eugoa turbida is a moth of the family Erebidae first described by Francis Walker in 1862. It is found on Borneo. The habitat consists of lowland forests.
