= Eugoa aliquotpunctata =

Scientific classification
- Domain: Eukaryota
- Kingdom: Animalia
- Phylum: Arthropoda
- Class: Insecta
- Order: Lepidoptera
- Superfamily: Noctuoidea
- Family: Erebidae
- Subfamily: Arctiinae
- Genus: Eugoa
- Species: E. aliquotpunctata

Binomial name
- Eugoa aliquotpunctata Bucsek, 2008

Species of moth

Eugoa aliquotpunctata is a moth of the family Erebidae. It is found in western Malaysia.
