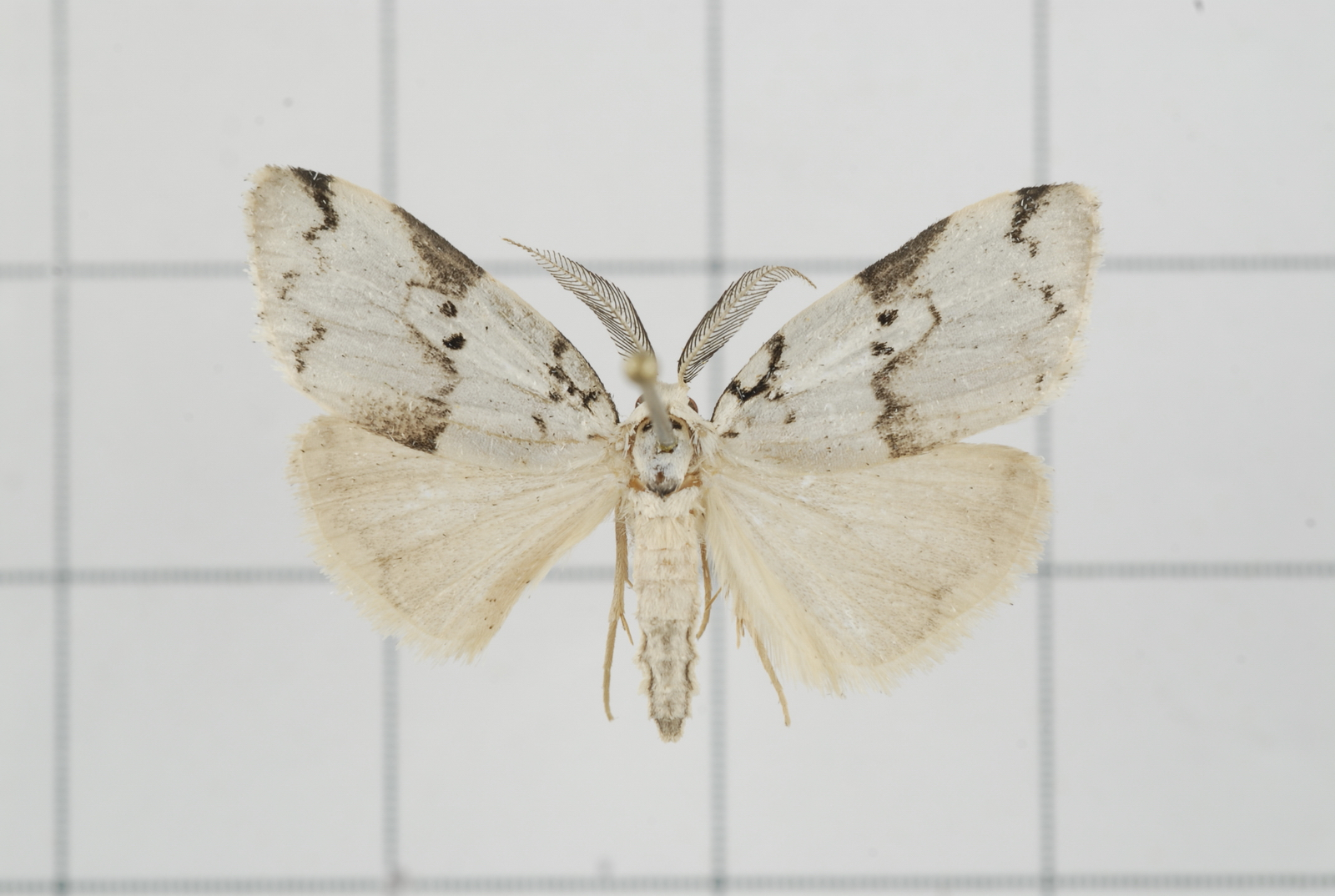

Scientific classification
- Domain: Eukaryota
- Kingdom: Animalia
- Phylum: Arthropoda
- Class: Insecta
- Order: Lepidoptera
- Superfamily: Noctuoidea
- Family: Erebidae
- Subfamily: Arctiinae
- Genus: Eugoa
- Species: E. sinuata

Binomial name
- Eugoa sinuata Wileman, 1914

= Eugoa sinuata =

Species of moth

Eugoa sinuata is a moth of the family Erebidae. It is found in Taiwan.
