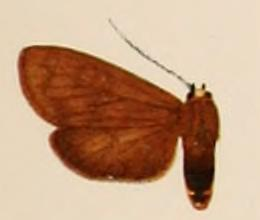

Scientific classification
- Domain: Eukaryota
- Kingdom: Animalia
- Phylum: Arthropoda
- Class: Insecta
- Order: Lepidoptera
- Superfamily: Noctuoidea
- Family: Erebidae
- Subfamily: Arctiinae
- Genus: Tricypha
- Species: T. pseudotricypha

Binomial name
- Tricypha pseudotricypha (Rothschild, 1909)

Synonyms
- Elysius pseudotricypha Rothschild, 1909

= Tricypha pseudotricypha =

Species of moth

Tricypha pseudotricypha is a moth of the subfamily Arctiinae first described by Rothschild in 1909. It is found in French Guiana, Suriname, Amazonas and Peru.
