= Eugoa apiensis =

Scientific classification
- Kingdom: Animalia
- Phylum: Arthropoda
- Clade: Pancrustacea
- Class: Insecta
- Order: Lepidoptera
- Superfamily: Noctuoidea
- Family: Erebidae
- Subfamily: Arctiinae
- Genus: Eugoa
- Species: E. apiensis

Binomial name
- Eugoa apiensis Holloway, 2001

Species of moth

Eugoa apiensis is a moth of the family Erebidae first described by Jeremy Daniel Holloway in 2001. It is found on Borneo. The habitat consists of montane forests on limestone.

The length of the forewings is 8–9 mm.
