= Manatha albipes =

Scientific classification
- Kingdom: Animalia
- Phylum: Arthropoda
- Clade: Pancrustacea
- Class: Insecta
- Order: Lepidoptera
- Family: Psychidae
- Genus: Manatha
- Species: M. albipes

Binomial name
- Manatha albipes Moore, 1877

Species of moth

Manatha albipes is a moth of the family Psychidae first described by Frederic Moore in 1877. It is found in Sri Lanka.
