= Pteroxys goniatus =

Scientific classification
- Kingdom: Animalia
- Phylum: Arthropoda
- Class: Insecta
- Order: Lepidoptera
- Family: Psychidae
- Genus: Pteroxys
- Species: P. goniatus

Binomial name
- Pteroxys goniatus Hampson, 1892

Species of moth

Pteroxys goniatus is a moth of the family Psychidae first described by George Hampson in 1892. It is found in India and Sri Lanka.
