= Pteroxys uniformis =

Scientific classification
- Kingdom: Animalia
- Phylum: Arthropoda
- Class: Insecta
- Order: Lepidoptera
- Family: Psychidae
- Genus: Pteroxys
- Species: P. uniformis

Binomial name
- Pteroxys uniformis Hampson, 1892

Synonyms
- Pteroma uniforme Hampson, 1893

Species of moth

Pteroxys uniformis is a moth of the family Psychidae first described by George Hampson in 1892. It is found in India and Sri Lanka.
