= Chalioides vitrea =

Scientific classification
- Kingdom: Animalia
- Phylum: Arthropoda
- Clade: Pancrustacea
- Class: Insecta
- Order: Lepidoptera
- Family: Psychidae
- Genus: Chalioides
- Species: C. vitrea

Binomial name
- Chalioides vitrea Swinhoe, 1892

Species of moth

Chalioides vitrea is a moth of the family Psychidae first described by Swinhoe in 1892. It is found in Oriental regions of India and Sri Lanka.

Larval host plants are Camellia sinensis, Eucalyptus camaldulensis, Grewia hirsuta, Mangifera indica, Quisqualis indica, Tamarindus indica, Albizia and Acacia.
