= Psomocolaides rhabdophora =

Scientific classification
- Kingdom: Animalia
- Phylum: Arthropoda
- Clade: Pancrustacea
- Class: Insecta
- Order: Lepidoptera
- Family: Psychidae
- Genus: Psomocolaides
- Species: P. rhabdophora

Binomial name
- Psomocolaides rhabdophora (Hampson, 1893)

Synonyms
- Monda rhabdophora Hampson, 1893; Psomocolax rhabdophora (Hampson, 1893)

Species of moth

Psomocolaides rhabdophora is a moth of the family Psychidae first described by George Hampson in 1893. It is found in India and Sri Lanka.

Larval host plants are Camellia sinensis and Cinchona species.
