= Aprata =

Scientific classification
- Kingdom: Animalia
- Phylum: Arthropoda
- Clade: Pancrustacea
- Class: Insecta
- Order: Lepidoptera
- Family: Psychidae
- Genus: Aprata; Moore, 1883
- Species: A. mackwoodii

Binomial name
- Aprata mackwoodii Moore, 1883

Genus of moths

Aprata mackwoodii is a moth of the family Psychidae first described by Frederic Moore in 1883. It is the only species in the genus Aprata. It is found in Sri Lanka.
