= Kotochalia doubledayi =

Scientific classification
- Kingdom: Animalia
- Phylum: Arthropoda
- Clade: Pancrustacea
- Class: Insecta
- Order: Lepidoptera
- Family: Psychidae
- Genus: Kotochalia
- Species: K. doubledayi

Binomial name
- Kotochalia doubledayi (Westwood, 1854)

Synonyms
- Acanthopsyche (Oiketicoides) doubledayi (Westwood, 1854); Kotochalia doubledaii (Westwood, 1854); Oiketicoides doubledayi (Westwood, 1854); Oiketicus doubledaii Westwood, 1854

Species of moth

Kotochalia doubledayi is a moth of the family Psychidae first described by John O. Westwood in 1854. It is found in Sri Lanka.
