= Kotochalia =

Scientific classification
- Kingdom: Animalia
- Phylum: Arthropoda
- Clade: Pancrustacea
- Class: Insecta
- Order: Lepidoptera
- Family: Psychidae
- Subfamily: Oiketicinae
- Tribe: Acanthopsychini
- Genus: Kotochalia; Sonan, 1935

Genus of moths

Kotochalia is a genus of moths belonging to the family Psychidae.

The species of this genus are found in Africa.

Species:

- Kotochalia doubledayi Westwood, 1854
- Kotochalia junodi Heylaerts, 1890
- Kotochalia shirakii Sonan, 1935
