= Bambalina consorta =

Scientific classification
- Kingdom: Animalia
- Phylum: Arthropoda
- Clade: Pancrustacea
- Class: Insecta
- Order: Lepidoptera
- Family: Psychidae
- Genus: Bambalina
- Species: B. consorta

Binomial name
- Bambalina consorta (Templeton, 1847)

Synonyms
- Oiketicus (Cryptothela) consortus Templeton, 1846

Species of moth

Bambalina consorta is a moth of the family Psychidae first described by Robert Templeton in 1847. It is found in Sri Lanka.
