= Acanthopsyche cana =

Scientific classification
- Kingdom: Animalia
- Phylum: Arthropoda
- Clade: Pancrustacea
- Class: Insecta
- Order: Lepidoptera
- Family: Psychidae
- Genus: Acanthopsyche
- Species: A. cana

Binomial name
- Acanthopsyche cana (Hampson, 1892)

Synonyms
- Lomera cana Hampson, 1893

Species of moth

Acanthopsyche cana is a moth of the family Psychidae first described by George Hampson in 1892. It is found in India and Sri Lanka.

Larval host plants are Cocos nucifera, Elaeis guineensis, Hevea brasiliensis and Punica granatum.
