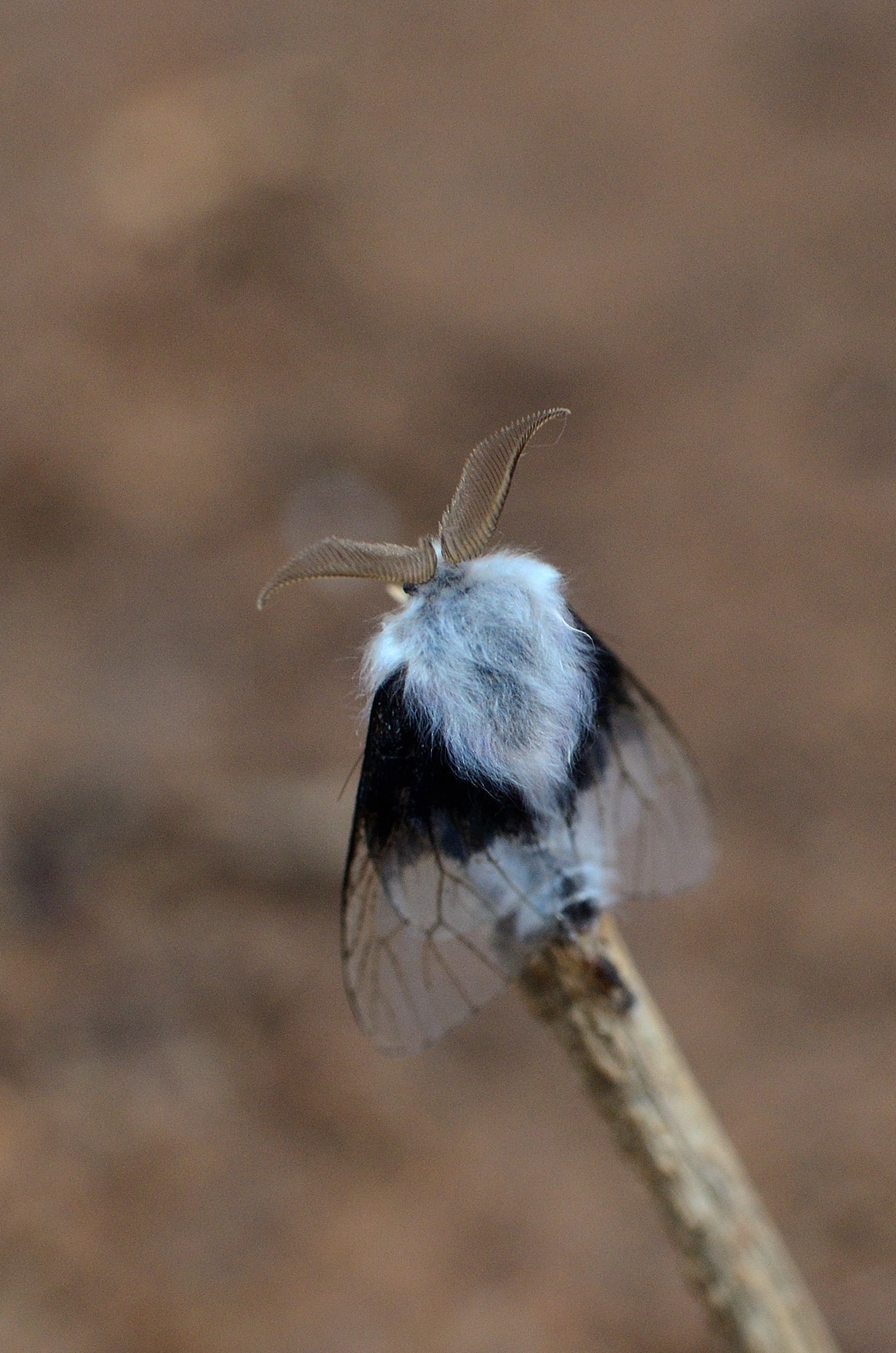

Scientific classification
- Domain: Eukaryota
- Kingdom: Animalia
- Phylum: Arthropoda
- Class: Insecta
- Order: Lepidoptera
- Family: Psychidae
- Genus: Acanthopsyche
- Species: A. bipars

Binomial name
- Acanthopsyche bipars (Walker, 1865)

Synonyms
- Perina bipars Walker, 1865; Amatissa weyersi (Heylaerts, 1885); Kophene weyersi (Heylaerts, 1885)

= Acanthopsyche bipars =

Acanthopysche bipars male

Acanthopsyche bipars is a bagworm moth of the genus Acanthopsyche originally described as Perina bipars by Walker in 1868 using a specimen form India.

== Description ==
Head, thorax, and abdomen black, clothed with white hairs. Fore wing hyaline, the basal area smoky black; veins and margins narrowly black. Hind wing with the basal two-thirds smoky black; marginal area hyaline; the veins and margins narrowly black. Size 18–28mm.

== Ecology ==
Recorded feeding on tea in Sikkim and apple leaves in Shillong.

== Distribution ==
It is found in India.
