= Tricypha mathani =

Scientific classification
- Domain: Eukaryota
- Kingdom: Animalia
- Phylum: Arthropoda
- Class: Insecta
- Order: Lepidoptera
- Superfamily: Noctuoidea
- Family: Erebidae
- Subfamily: Arctiinae
- Genus: Tricypha
- Species: T. mathani

Binomial name
- Tricypha mathani (Rothschild, 1909)

Synonyms
- Biturix mathani Rothschild, 1909

Species of moth

Tricypha mathani is a moth of the subfamily Arctiinae. It was described by Walter Rothschild in 1909. It is found in Colombia.
