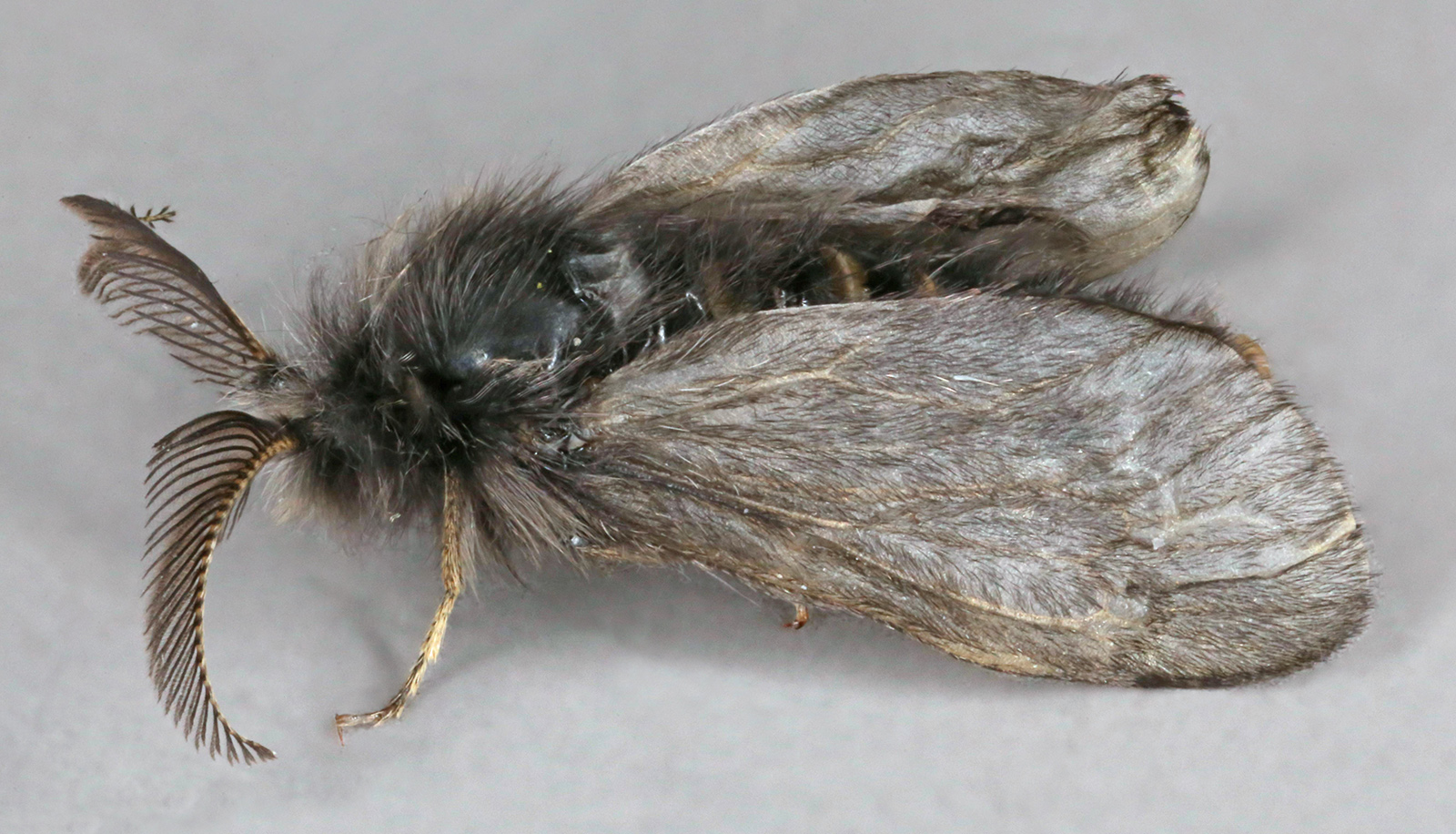
- Acanthopsyche atra male

Scientific classification
- Kingdom: Animalia
- Phylum: Arthropoda
- Class: Insecta
- Order: Lepidoptera
- Family: Psychidae
- Genus: Acanthopsyche; Heylaerts, 1881

Synonyms
- Hemilipia Hampson, 1897

= Acanthopsyche =

Genus of moths

Acanthopsyche is a genus of moths in the Psychidae family. The genus was named by the Dutch entomologist Franciscus J.M. Heylaerts.

The males are relatively large, with a wingspan of 15–28 mm. The females are apterous (i.e. wingless) and have rudimentary antennae and legs. The eyes are reduced to black spots. The larvae live in a case which is covered longitudinally with plant matter.

== Species ==
- Acanthopsyche alstoni (Watt & Mann, 1903)
- Acanthopsyche atra (Linnaeus, 1767)
- Acanthopsyche bipars (Walker, 1865)
- Acanthopsyche calamochroa (Hampson, 1910)
- Acanthopsyche cana (Hampson, 1892)
- Acanthopsyche canarensis (Hampson, 1905)
- Acanthopsyche carayoni (Bourgogne, 1986)
- Acanthopsyche carbonaria (Karsch, 1900)
- Acanthopsyche chrysora (Bourgogne, 1980)
- Acanthopsyche ebneri (Rebel, 1917)
- Acanthopsyche ecksteini (Lederer, 1855)
- Acanthopsyche elwesi (Heylaerts, 1890)
- Acanthopsyche emiliae (Heylaerts, 1890)
- Acanthopsyche entwistlei (Bourgogne, 1962)
- Acanthopsyche ernsti (Bourgogne, 1980)
- Acanthopysche larimanti (Heylaerts, 1904)
- Acanthopsyche melanoleuca (Bourgogne, 1965)
- Acanthopsyche mixta (Bourgogne, 1962)
- Acanthopsyche modesta (Bourgogne, 1978)
- Acanthopsyche multicaulis (Bourgogne, 1985)
- Acanthopsyche ogiva (Bourgogne, 1984)
- Acanthopsyche pauliani (Bourgogne, 1984)
- Acanthopsyche phaea (Bourgogne, 1979)
- Acanthopsyche punctimarginalis (Hampson, 1897)
- Acanthopsyche roomei (Bourgogne, 1984)
- Acanthopsyche siederi (Szőcs, 1961)
- Acanthopsyche sierricola (White, 1858)
- Acanthopsyche tristis (Janse, 1917)
- Acanthopsyche tristoides (Bourgogne, 1965)
- Acanthopsyche nigraplaga (Wileman, 1911)
- Acanthopsyche zelleri (Mann, 1856)
- Acanthopsyche zernyi (Bourgogne, 1964)
