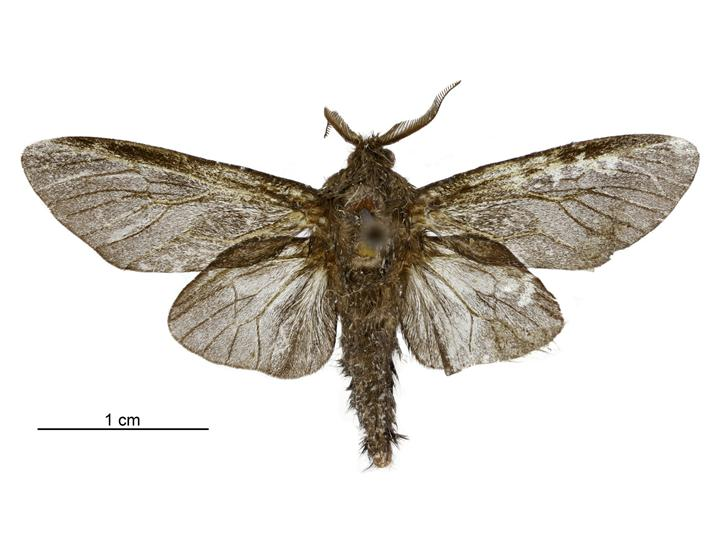

Scientific classification
- Kingdom: Animalia
- Phylum: Arthropoda
- Clade: Pancrustacea
- Class: Insecta
- Order: Lepidoptera
- Family: Psychidae
- Subfamily: Oiketicinae
- Genus: Dappula; Moore, 1883
- Species: D. tertia

Binomial name
- Dappula tertia (Templeton, 1847)

Synonyms
- Oiketicus tertius Templeton, 1846; Dappula tertius; Clania tertia; Oiketicus templetonii Westwood, 1855; Oiketicus ulias Lower, 1899

= Dappula =

Genus of moths

Dappula tertia is a moth of the Psychidae family. It is the only species in the genus Dappula. It is widely distributed in the Indo-Australian region, where it is found from India to the Solomon Islands. The habitat consists of lowland areas.

The larvae have been recorded feeding on Annona muricata and Cocos nucifera. It can cause damage in Oil Palm and Coffee plantations.
