= Franciscus J. M. Heylaerts =

Dutch entomologist

Franciscus J.M. Heylaerts (1831–1916) was a Dutch entomologist who specialised in Lepidoptera (most notably Psychidae world species) and Coleoptera. By profession he was a physician. His collection of Psychidae is held by Rijksmuseum Natural History, Leiden.

== Works ==
partial list

- Heylaerts F. J. M. 1881. Essai d'une monographie des Psychidae de la faune européenne. Bulletin de la Société entomologique de Belgique 25:29–73.
- Heylaerts J. F. M., 1884a. Observations synonymiques et autres relatives à des Psychides, avec descriptions de novae species.Annales de la Société entomologique de Belgique 28(): 34–41.
- Heylaerts J. F. M., 1884b. Fourreau inédit et chenille de psychide de l'Afrique méridionale. Eumeta ? Zelleri m. Comptes rendus de la Société entomologique de Belgique 28(): xcviii–xcix.
- Heylaerts J. F. M., 1884 On the exotic Psychids in the Leyden Museum.Notes from the Leyden Museum 6(): 129–133.
- Heylaerts J. F. M., 1888. Une Psychide inédite de l'Afrique. Bulletin de la Société entomologique de Belgique 32(): lix–lx.
- Heylaerts J. F. M., 1890 Notes psychidologiques. Bulletin de la Société entomologique de Belgique 34(): cxxx–cxxxiii.
- Heylaerts J. F. M., 1890 Trois Psychides inédites de l'Afrique orientale méridionale. Bulletin de la Société entomologique de Belgique 34(): clxxx–clxxxiii.
- Heylaerts J. F. M., 1891. Deux espèces nouvelles et un genre nouveau de Lépidoptères africans. Bulletin de la Société entomologique de Belgique 35(): ccclxxiv–ccclxxvi.
- Heylaerts J. F. M., 1906. Remarques sur quelques Psychides. Annales de la Société entomologique de Belgique 50(): 97–100.
- Heylaerts F. J. M.1891 Heterocera exotica, nouveaux genre et espèces des indes orientales neerlandaises C. R. Soc. Ent. Belge 35 : ccccix–ccccxvii,[409–417]
