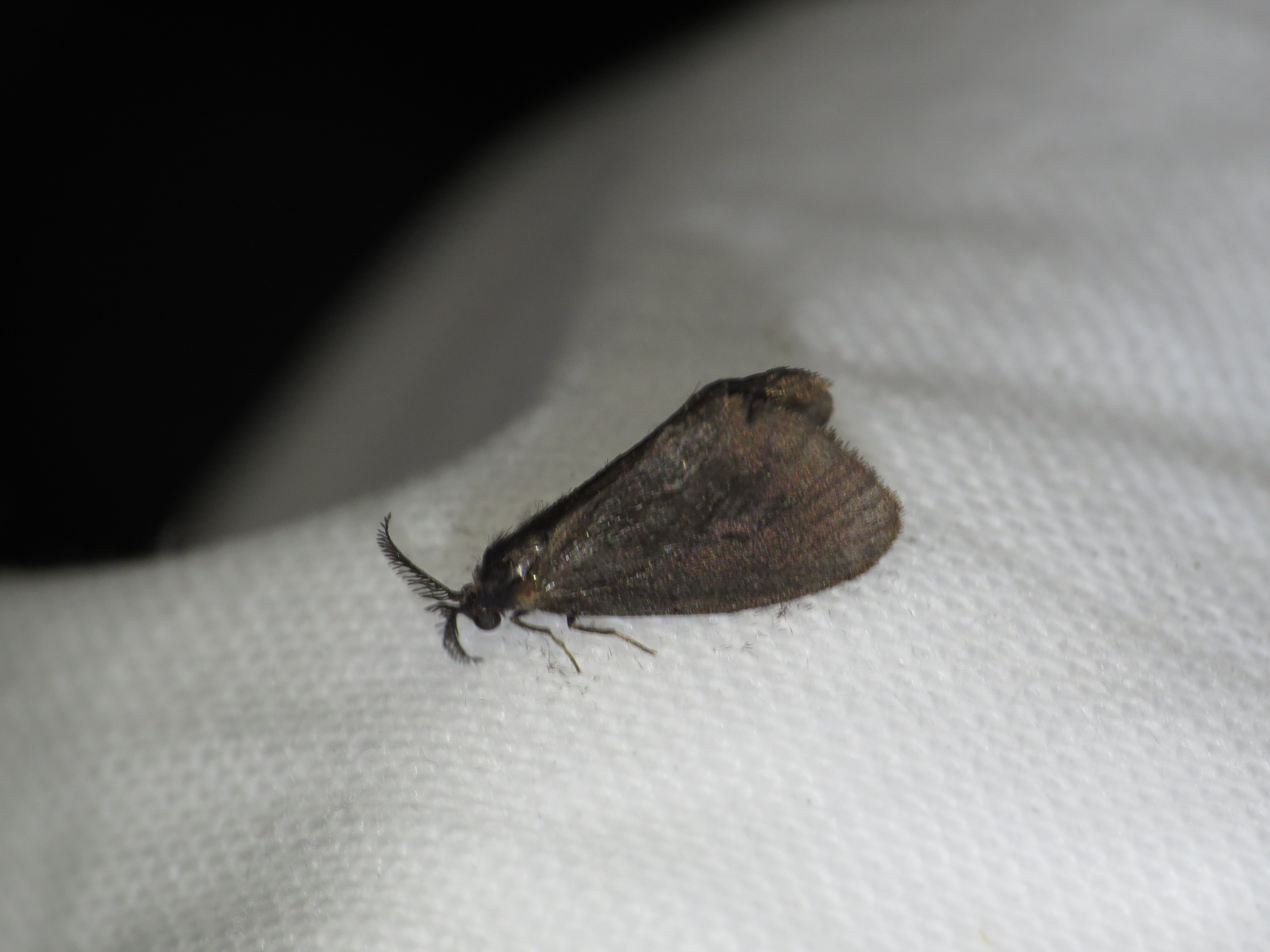
- Cryptothelea nigrita

Scientific classification
- Domain: Eukaryota
- Kingdom: Animalia
- Phylum: Arthropoda
- Class: Insecta
- Order: Lepidoptera
- Family: Psychidae
- Subfamily: Psychinae

= Psychinae =

Subfamily of moths

Psychinae is a subfamily of bagworm moths in the family Psychidae.

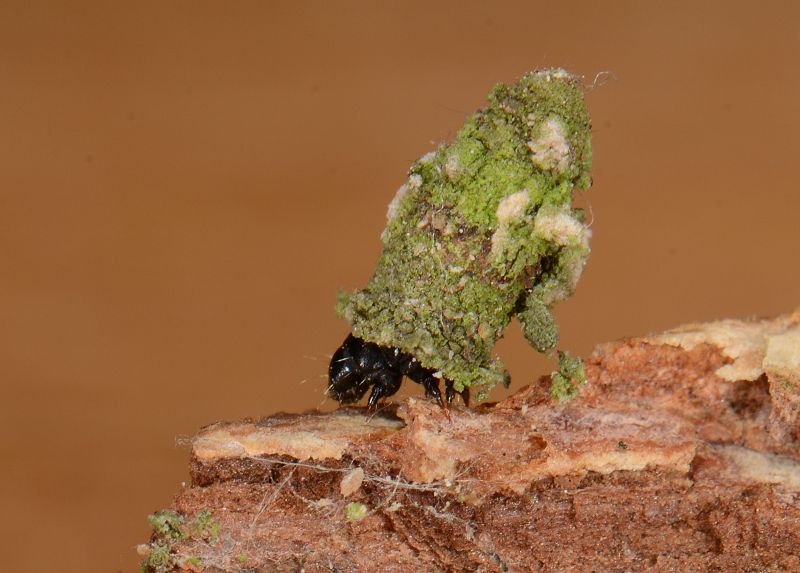
Bacotia claustrella larva in case

== Genera ==
These 12 genera belong to the subfamily Psychinae:

- Anaproutia Lewin, 1949^{g}
- Astala Davis, 1964^{c g b}
- Bacotia Tutt, 1899^{c g}
- Basicladus Davis, 1964^{c g b}
- Coloneura Davis, 1964^{g}
- Cryptothelea Duncan, 1841^{c g b}
- Hyaloscotes Butler, 1881^{c g}
- Luffia Tutt, 1899^{c g}
- Peloponnesia Sieder, 1959^{c g}
- Prochalia Barnes & McDunnough, 1913^{c g}
- Proutia Tutt, 1899^{c g}
- Psyche Schrank, 1801^{c g b}

Data sources: i = ITIS, c = Catalogue of Life, g = GBIF, b = Bugguide.net
