= Astala =

Astala is a Finnish surname that may refer to

- Juho Astala (1860–1936), Finnish farmer and politician
- Kari Astala (born 1953), Finnish mathematician
- Sampsa Astala (born 1974), Finnish heavy metal musician
- Astala (moth), a genus of bagworm moths in the family Psychidae

== See also ==
- Diaethria astala, a butterfly
