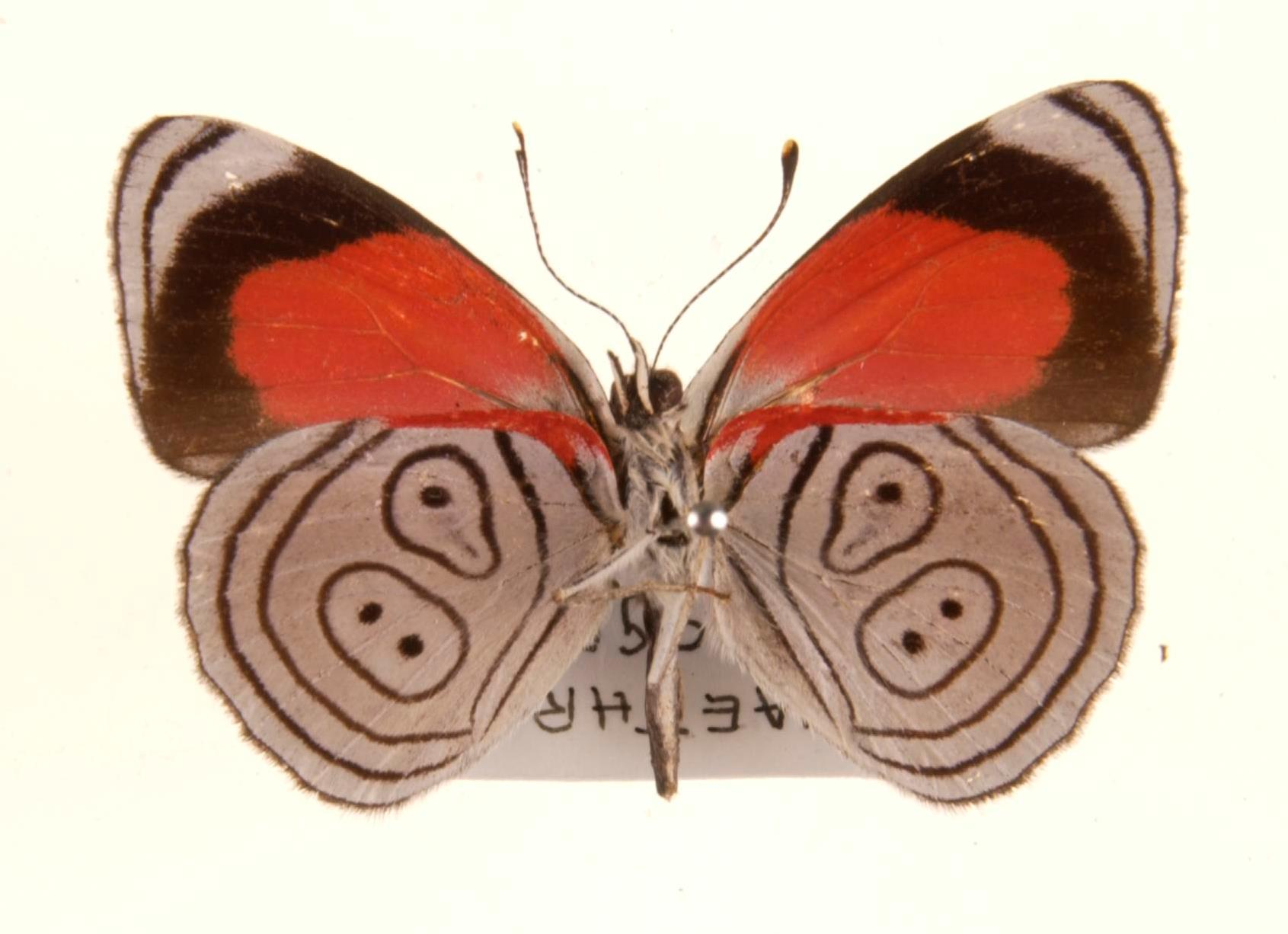

Scientific classification
- Kingdom: Animalia
- Phylum: Arthropoda
- Clade: Pancrustacea
- Class: Insecta
- Order: Lepidoptera
- Family: Nymphalidae
- Genus: Diaethria
- Species: D. phlogea

Binomial name
- Diaethria phlogea (Salvin & Godman, 1868)

Synonyms
- Callicore phlogea Salvin & Godman, 1868; Callicore bifasciata Weymer, 1907; Callicore donckieri Oberthür, 1916; Callicore ditaeniata Röber, 1924; Diaethria euclides phlogea

= Diaethria phlogea =

89'98 butterfly

Species of butterfly

Diaethria phlogea, the 89'98 butterfly, is a species of butterfly of the family Nymphalidae. It is found in Colombia, South America.

It has been given the nickname "89/98" because of the markings on its wings resembling an 89 and 98. This is a trait common to all Diaethria.

Some authors consider it to be a subspecies of Diaethria euclides as Diaethria euclides phlogea.
