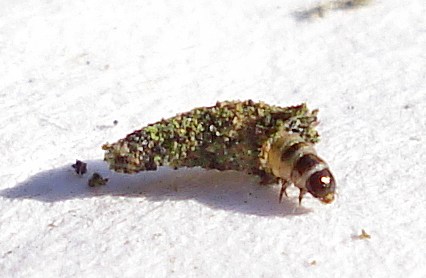
- Larva of Luffia ferchaultella

Scientific classification
- Kingdom: Animalia
- Phylum: Arthropoda
- Clade: Pancrustacea
- Class: Insecta
- Order: Lepidoptera
- Family: Psychidae
- Genus: Luffia
- Species: L. ferchaultella

Binomial name
- Luffia ferchaultella (Stephens, 1850)

= Luffia ferchaultella =

Species of moth

Luffia ferchaultella is a moth of the Psychidae family. It is found in Ireland, the United Kingdom, Belgium, the Netherlands, Luxembourg, France, Spain, Portugal, Switzerland, Germany and Italy.

Only the self-fertile wingless female is known, (unless it is the same species as Luffia lapidella). Cased larvae feed, often in flocks, on lichen. They can often be found in large numbers on lichen-covered tree trunks and fences.
