= Proutia rotunda =

Scientific classification
- Domain: Eukaryota
- Kingdom: Animalia
- Phylum: Arthropoda
- Class: Insecta
- Order: Lepidoptera
- Family: Psychidae
- Genus: Proutia
- Species: P. rotunda

Binomial name
- Proutia rotunda Suomalainen, 1990

Species of moth

Proutia rotunda is a moth belonging to the family Psychidae. The species was first described by Esko Suomalainen in 1990.

It is native to Northern Europe.
