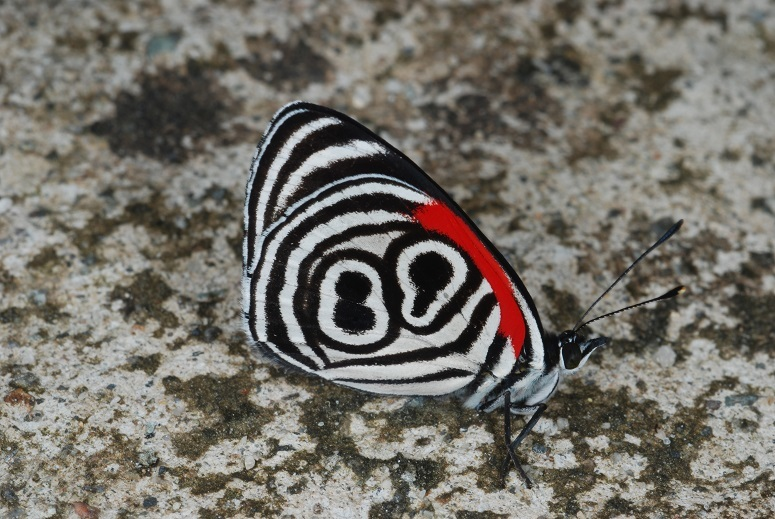
- Diaethria euclides phlogea

Scientific classification
- Kingdom: Animalia
- Phylum: Arthropoda
- Clade: Pancrustacea
- Class: Insecta
- Order: Lepidoptera
- Family: Nymphalidae
- Genus: Diaethria
- Species: D. euclides

Binomial name
- Diaethria euclides (Latreille, [1809])

Synonyms
- List: Erycina euclides Latreille, [1809]; Callicore euclides metiscus Doubleday, 1849; Callicore pavira Guenée, 1872; Callicore adelographa Oberthür, 1916; Callicore euclides phlogea Salvin & Godman, 1868; Callicore bifasciata Weymer, 1907; Callicore phlogea boliviana Röber, 1915; Callicore bifasciata Fruhstorfer, 1916 (preocc. Weymer, 1907); Callicore donckieri Oberthür, 1916; Callicore ditaeniata Röber, 1924; Callicore euclides artemis Röber, 1915; Callicore ducei Schaus & Cockerell, 1923; Callicore euclides gueneei Röber, 1915; Callicore euclides phlogeides Röber, 1915; Callicore gueneei Oberthür, 1916 (preocc. Röber, 1915)

= Diaethria euclides =

Species of butterfly

Diaethria euclides is a species of butterfly of the genus Diaethria. It was described by Pierre André Latreille in 1809. It is found from eastern Colombia to north-western Venezuela, western Ecuador and northwestern Peru.

== Subspecies ==
- D. e. euclides (Peru)
- D. e. artemis (Röber, 1915) (Colombia)
- D. e. gueneei (Röber, 1915) (Ecuador)
- D. e. metiscus (Doubleday, 1849) (Venezuela)
- D. e. phlogea (Salvin & Godman, 1868) (Colombia)
- D. e. phlogeides (Röber, 1915) (Colombia)
