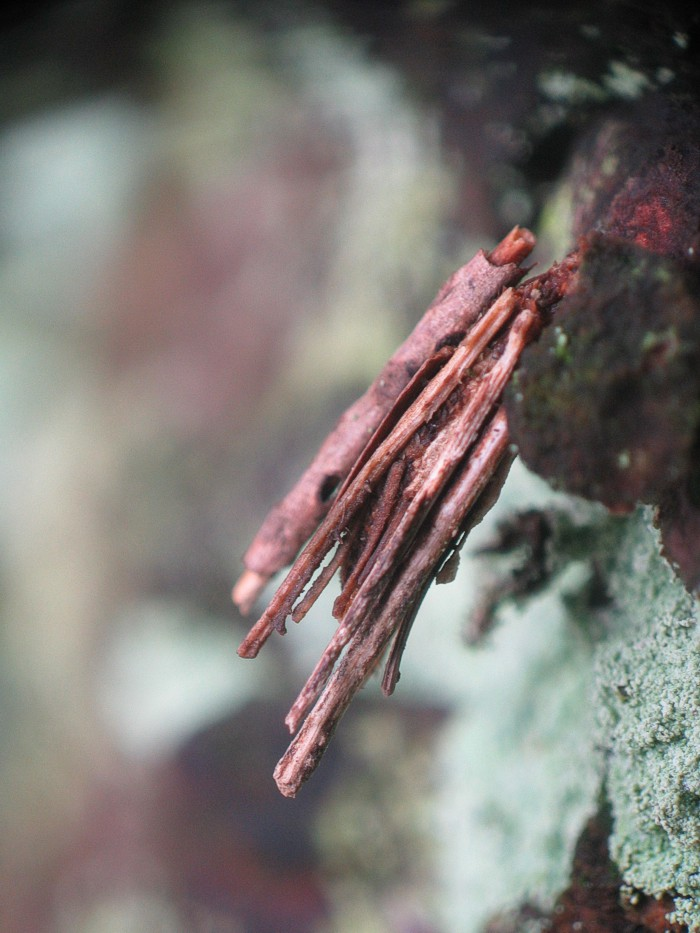

Scientific classification
- Domain: Eukaryota
- Kingdom: Animalia
- Phylum: Arthropoda
- Class: Insecta
- Order: Lepidoptera
- Family: Psychidae
- Genus: Anaproutia; Lewin, 1949

= Anaproutia =

Genus of butterflies

Anaproutia is a genus of moths belonging to the family Psychidae.

The species of this genus are found in Europe.

Species:

- Anaproutia comitella (Bruand, 1853)
- Anaproutia norvegica (Schoyen, 1880)
