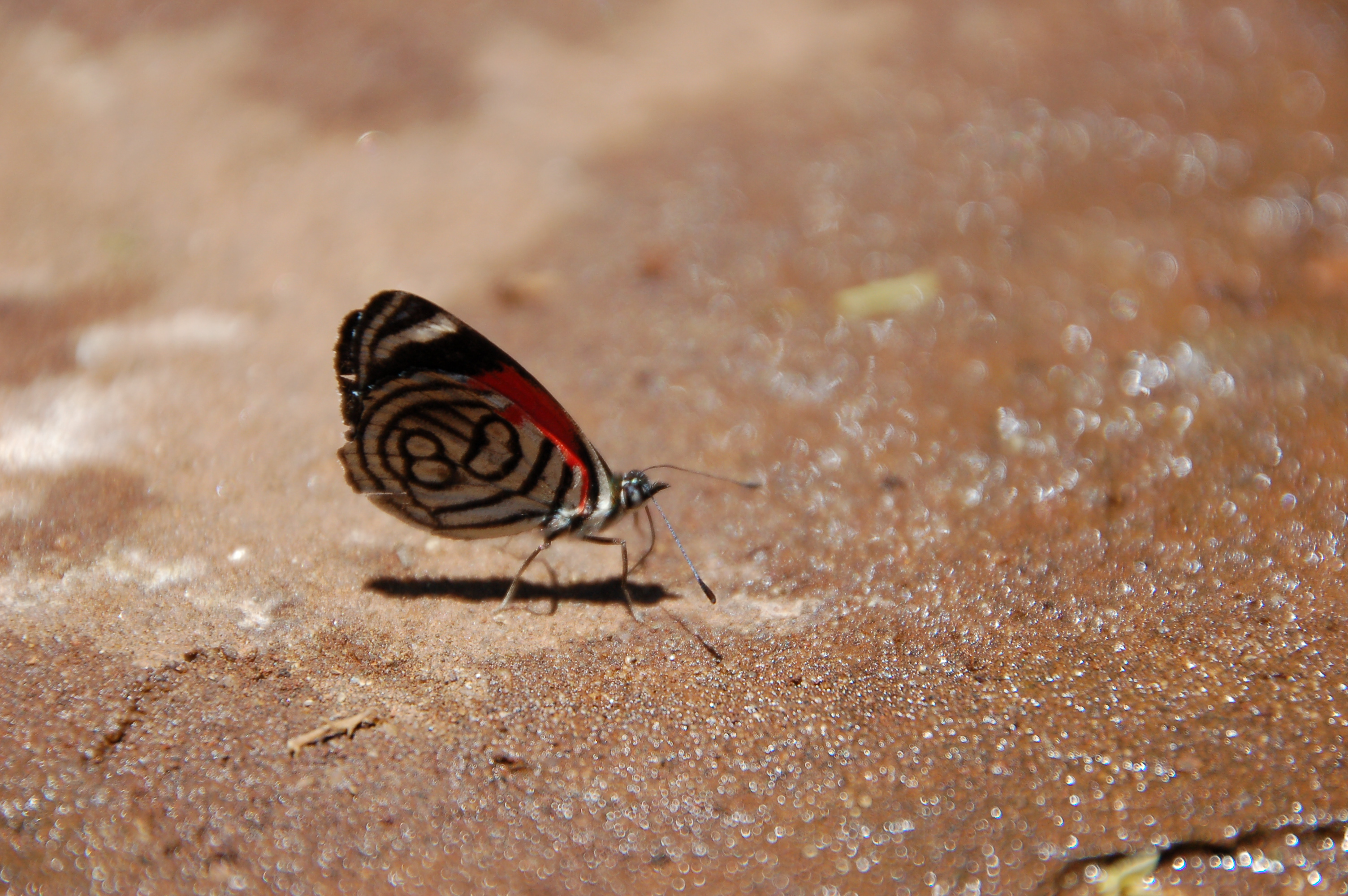

Scientific classification
- Kingdom: Animalia
- Phylum: Arthropoda
- Clade: Pancrustacea
- Class: Insecta
- Order: Lepidoptera
- Family: Nymphalidae
- Genus: Diaethria
- Species: D. candrena

Binomial name
- Diaethria candrena (Godart, [1824])

Subspecies
- Two, see text

Synonyms
- Nymphalis candrena Godart, [1824]; Callicore carmen Guenée, 1872; Callicore candrenoïdes Oberthür, 1916; Callicore köhleri Giacomelli, 1926; Callicore kohleri Giacomelli, 1926

= Diaethria candrena =

Species of butterfly

Diaethria candrena, the candrena eighty-eight or number eighty, is a species of butterfly of the family Nymphalidae. It is found in Argentina and Brazil.

The wingspan is 40–46 mm.

The larvae feed on Celtis species.

== Subspecies ==
Listed alphabetically:

- Diaethria candrena candrena (Argentina, Brazil (Rio Grande do Sul))
- Diaethria candrena longfieldae (Talbot, 1928) (Brazil (Mato Grosso))
