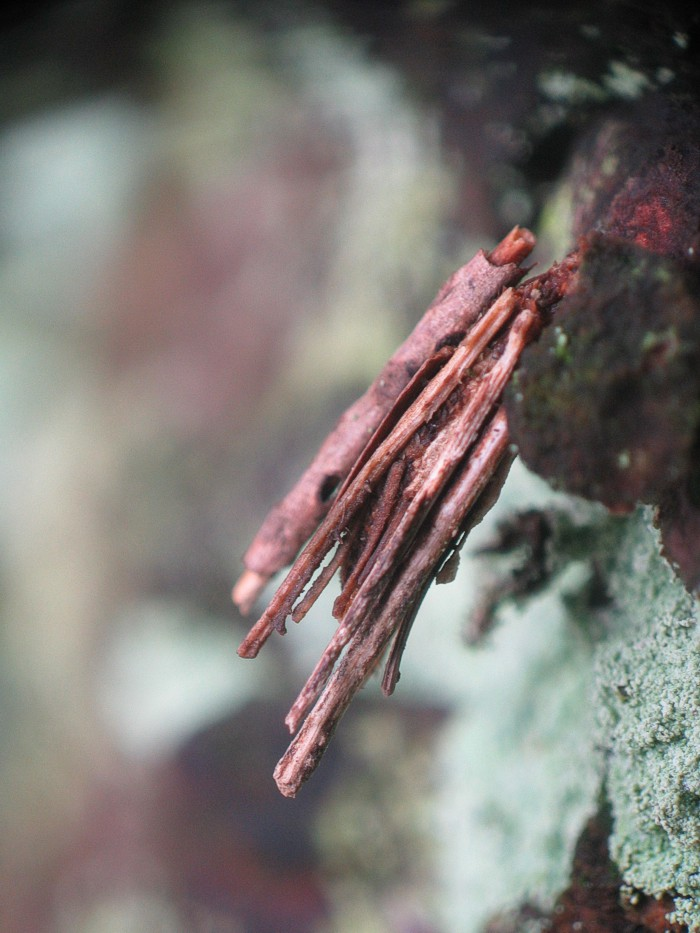

Scientific classification
- Domain: Eukaryota
- Kingdom: Animalia
- Phylum: Arthropoda
- Class: Insecta
- Order: Lepidoptera
- Family: Psychidae
- Genus: Anaproutia
- Species: A. comitella

Binomial name
- Anaproutia comitella (Bruand, 1845)

Synonyms
- Psyche comitella Bruand, 1845; Bruandia comitella; Masonia edwardsella Tutt, 1900; Psyche saxicolella Bruand, 1845

= Anaproutia comitella =

Species of moth

Anaproutia comitella is a moth of the Psychidae family. It is found in France, Germany, Switzerland, Austria, Slovenia, Croatia, Hungary, Romania and Bulgaria.

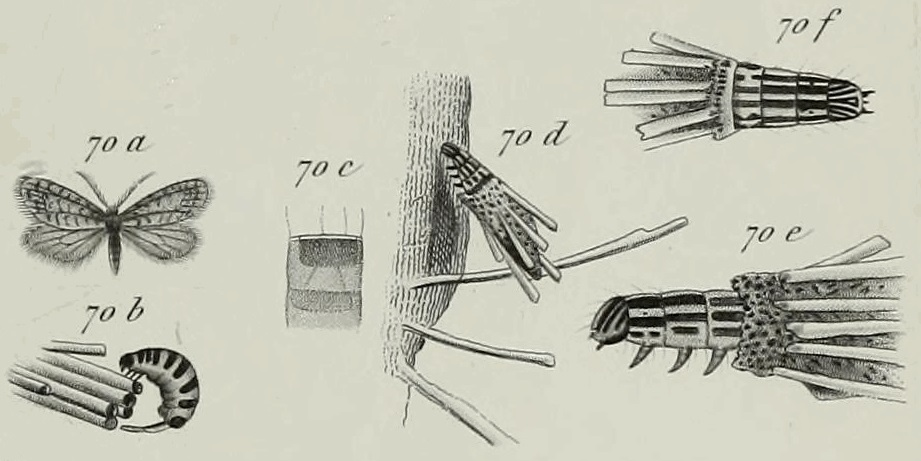
Original illustrations of the life cycle

The wingspan is about 15 mm for males. Female are wingless. Adults are on wing in May and June.
