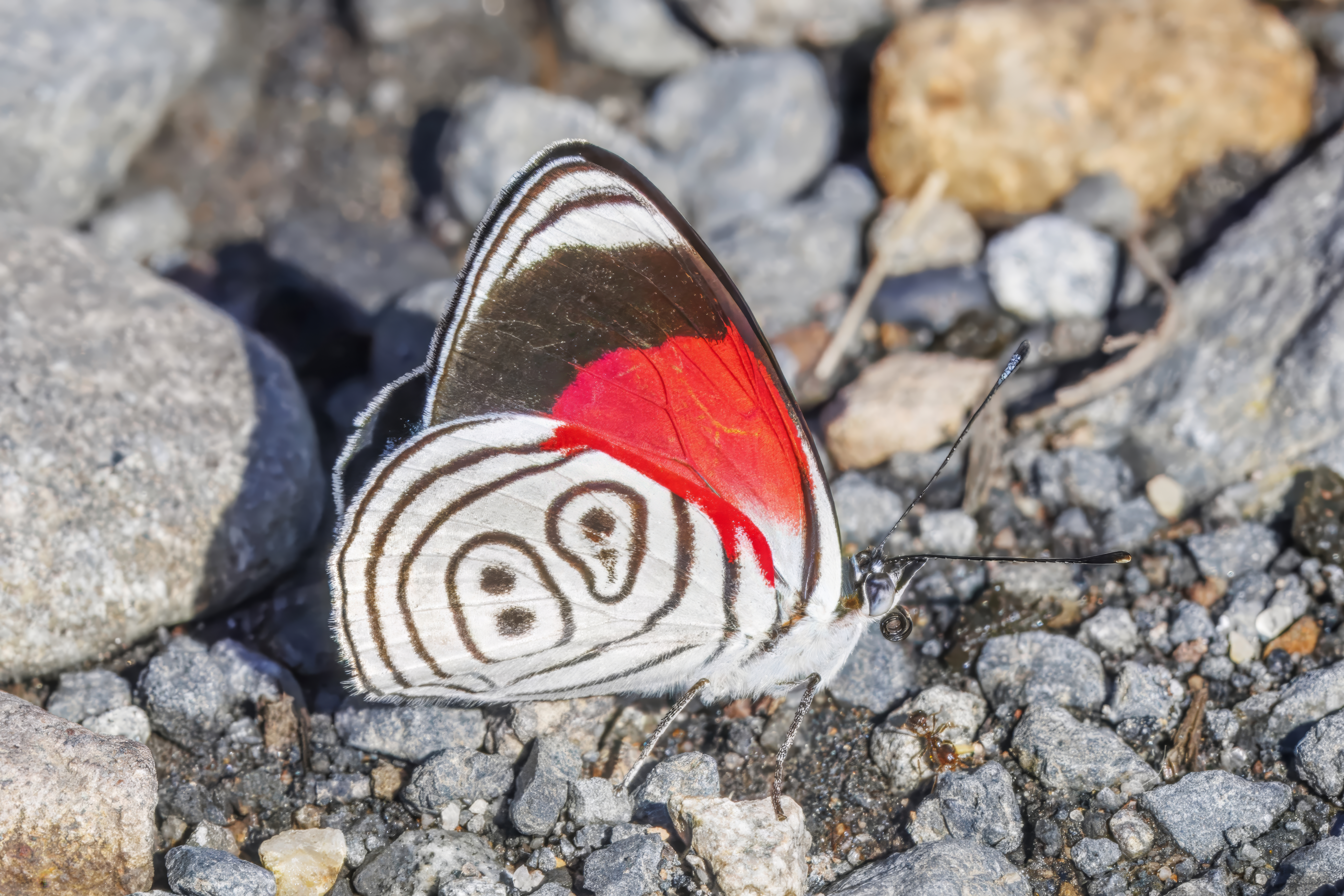
- In Ecuador
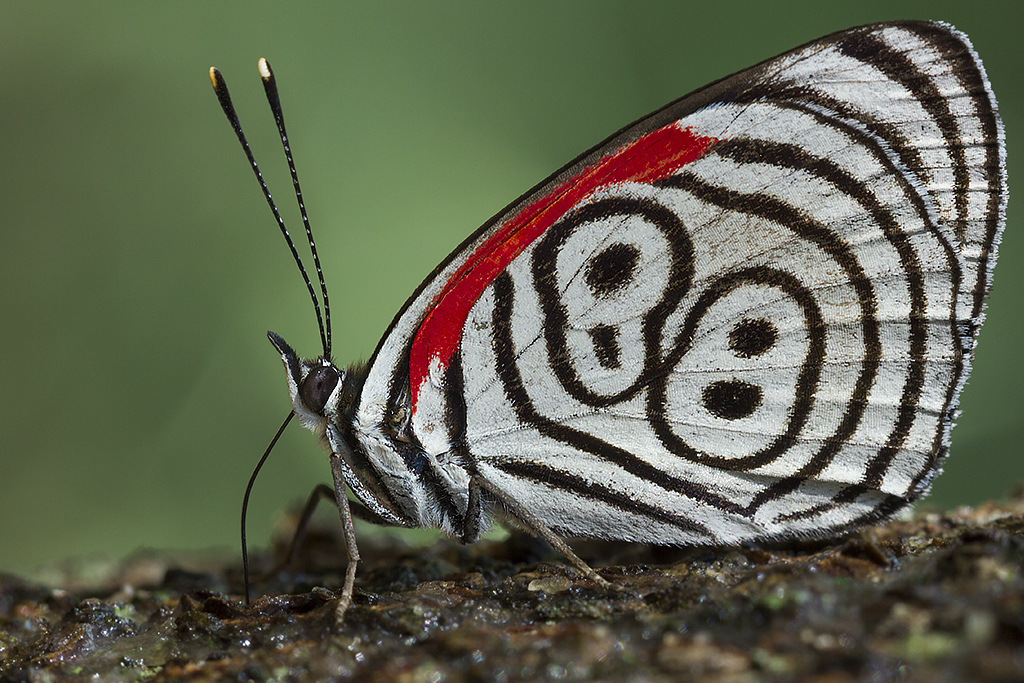
- In Brazil

Scientific classification
- Kingdom: Animalia
- Phylum: Arthropoda
- Clade: Pancrustacea
- Class: Insecta
- Order: Lepidoptera
- Family: Nymphalidae
- Genus: Diaethria
- Species: D. eluina

Binomial name
- Diaethria eluina (Hewitson, [1855])

Synonyms
- Catagramma eluina Hewitson, [1855]; Callicore coelinula Guenée, 1872; Callicore brevipalpis Guenée, 1872

= Diaethria eluina =

Eluina eighty-eight

Species of butterfly

Diaethria eluina, the eluina eighty-eight, is a species of butterfly of the family Nymphalidae. It is found from México to Peru to Bolivia and Brazil.

The wingspan is about 30–40 mm.

== Subspecies ==
- Diaethria eluina eluina (Brazil (Minas Gerais), Paraguay)
- Diaethria eluina lidwina (C. & R. Felder, 1862) (Peru)
- Diaethria eluina splendidus (Oberthür, 1916) (Brazil (Goiás))
