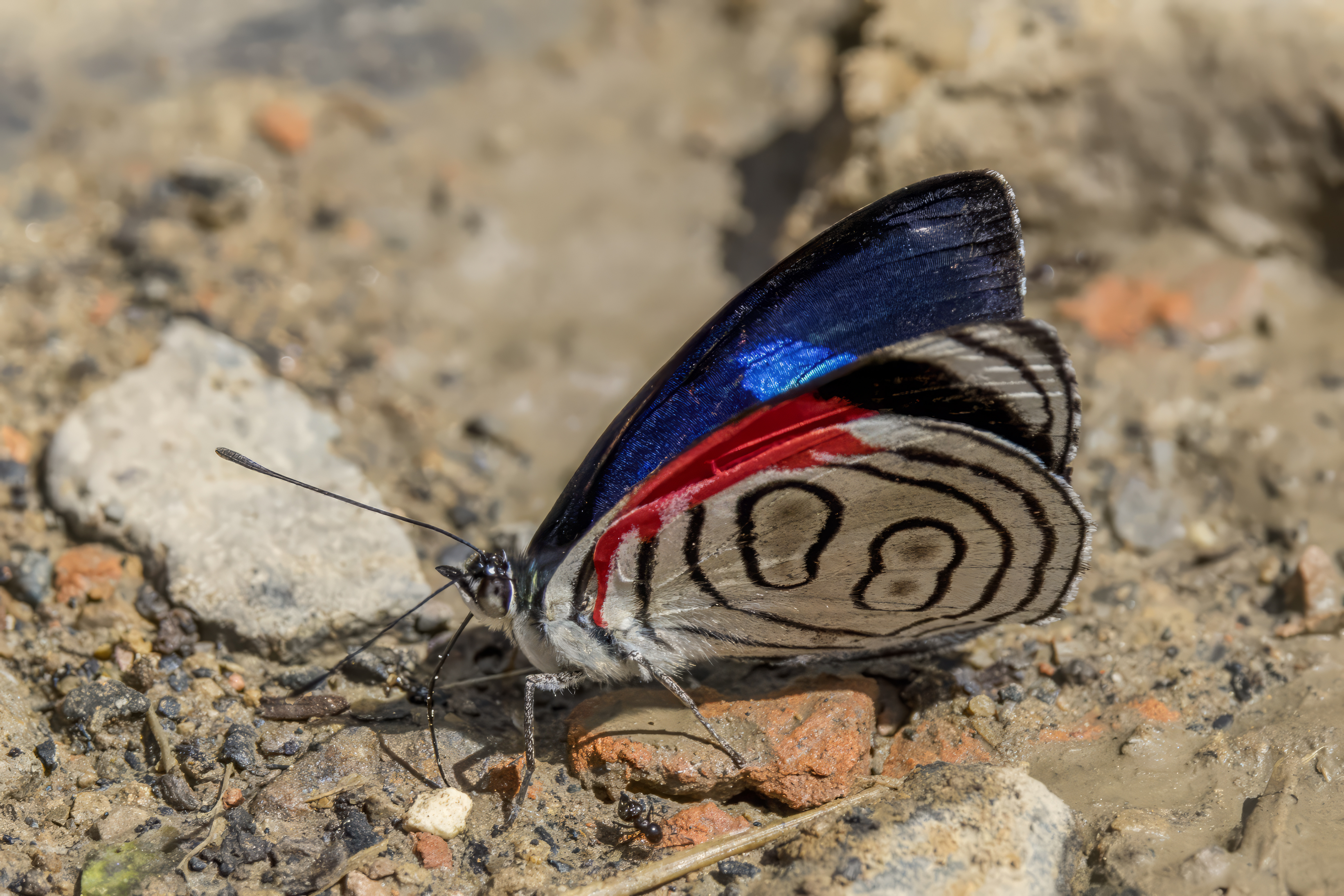
- Smudged eighty-eight D. gabaza gabaza, Colombia

Scientific classification
- Kingdom: Animalia
- Phylum: Arthropoda
- Clade: Pancrustacea
- Class: Insecta
- Order: Lepidoptera
- Family: Nymphalidae
- Genus: Diaethria
- Species: D. gabaza

Binomial name
- Diaethria gabaza (Hewitson, 1852)

Synonyms
- Catagramma gabaza Hewitson, 1855; Callicore wernickei Niepelt, 1918; Callicore eupepla Salvin & Godman, 1868; Callicore gabaza gabazina Oberthür, 1916; Callicore gabaza violanta Martin, [1923]; Callicore gabaza stenotaenia Röber, 1924; Callicore gabaza plumbilimbata Röber, 1924; Callicore astala var. coeruleomarginata Apolinar, 1928; Callicore gabaza intermedia Viette, 1958

= Diaethria gabaza =

Species of butterfly

Diaethria gabaza is a species of butterfly of the genus Diaethria. It was described by William Chapman Hewitson in 1852. It is found from Costa Rica and Guatemala to Colombia, Ecuador and Venezuela.

The larvae feed on Serjania species.

== Subspecies ==
- Diaethria gabaza gabaza (Colombia)
- Diaethria gabaza eupepla (Salvin & Godman, 1868) (Costa Rica, Guatemala to Colombia)
- Diaethria gabaza gabazina (Oberthür, 1916) (Colombia, Venezuela)
