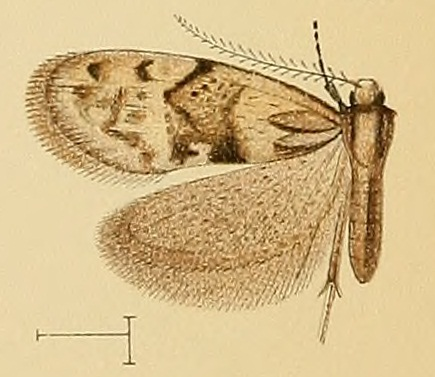

Scientific classification
- Domain: Eukaryota
- Kingdom: Animalia
- Phylum: Arthropoda
- Class: Insecta
- Order: Lepidoptera
- Family: Psychidae
- Genus: Luffia
- Species: L. rebeli

Binomial name
- Luffia rebeli Walsingham, 1908

= Luffia rebeli =

Species of moth

Luffia rebeli is a moth of the Psychidae family. It is found on the Canary Islands.

The wingspan is 8–12 mm. The forewings are shining pale stone-grey, mottled with greyish fuscous. The hindwings are pale mouse-grey.

The larvae feed on lichen.
