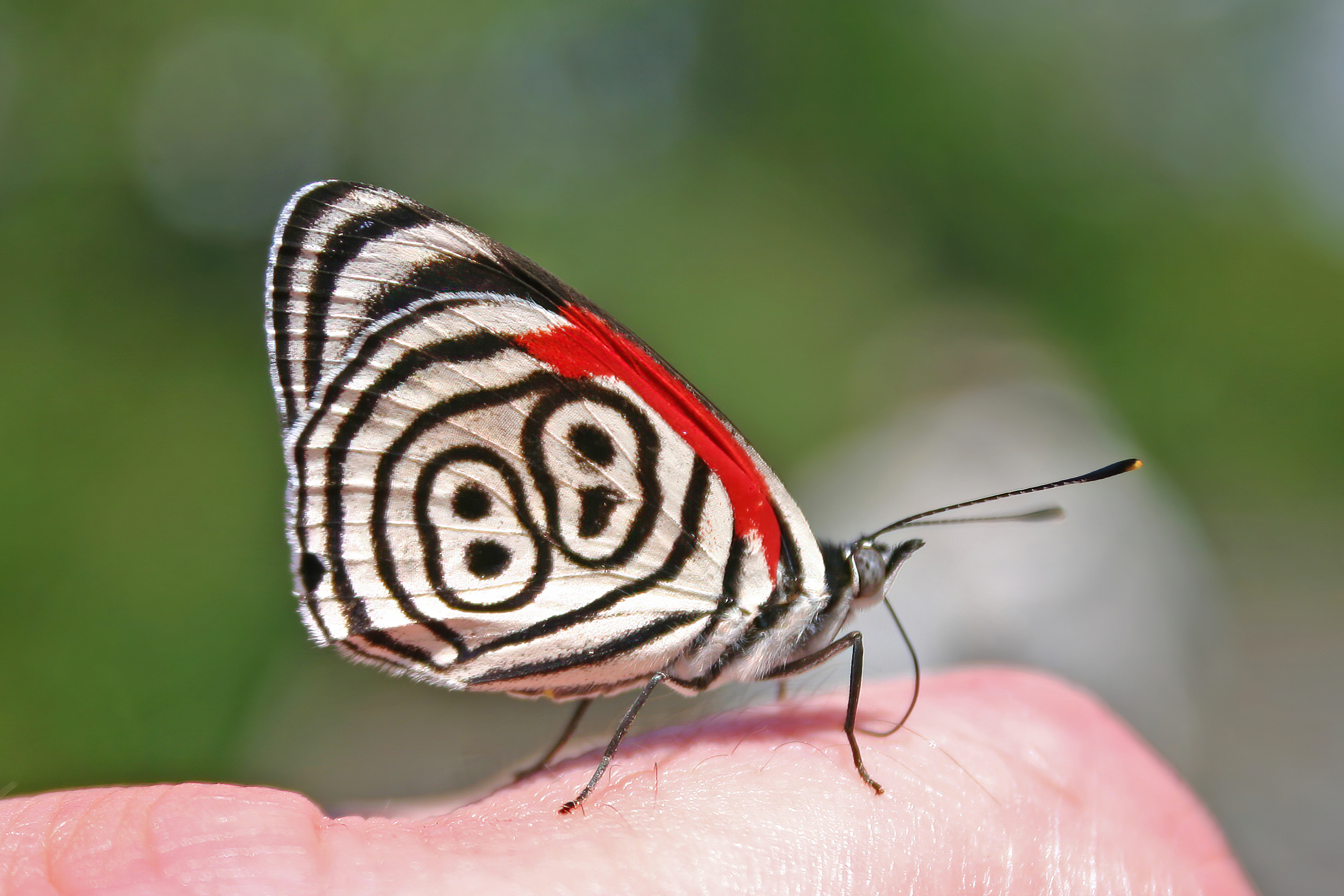

Scientific classification
- Kingdom: Animalia
- Phylum: Arthropoda
- Clade: Pancrustacea
- Class: Insecta
- Order: Lepidoptera
- Family: Nymphalidae
- Genus: Diaethria
- Species: D. anna

Binomial name
- Diaethria anna (Guérin-Méneville, 1844)

= Diaethria anna =

Anna's eighty-eight

Species of butterfly

Diaethria anna, also known as Anna's eighty-eight or Finita Burrasca , is a butterfly in wet tropical forests in Middle America. On rare occasions, it can be found as a stray in south Texas. Its upperside is dark brown with a metallic bluish-green band on the forewings. The underside of the forewings are red, which is followed by a wide, black band and then white tips; the underside of the hindwings is white, with lines that approximate a black-outlined "88", giving the species its common name. Its markings occasionally appear more like of "98" or "89".

The caterpillars feed on tropical plants in the families Ulmaceae and Sapindaceae. Adults feed on rotting fruit and dung.

Subspecies are:

- Diaethria anna anna
- Diaethria anna salvadorensis
