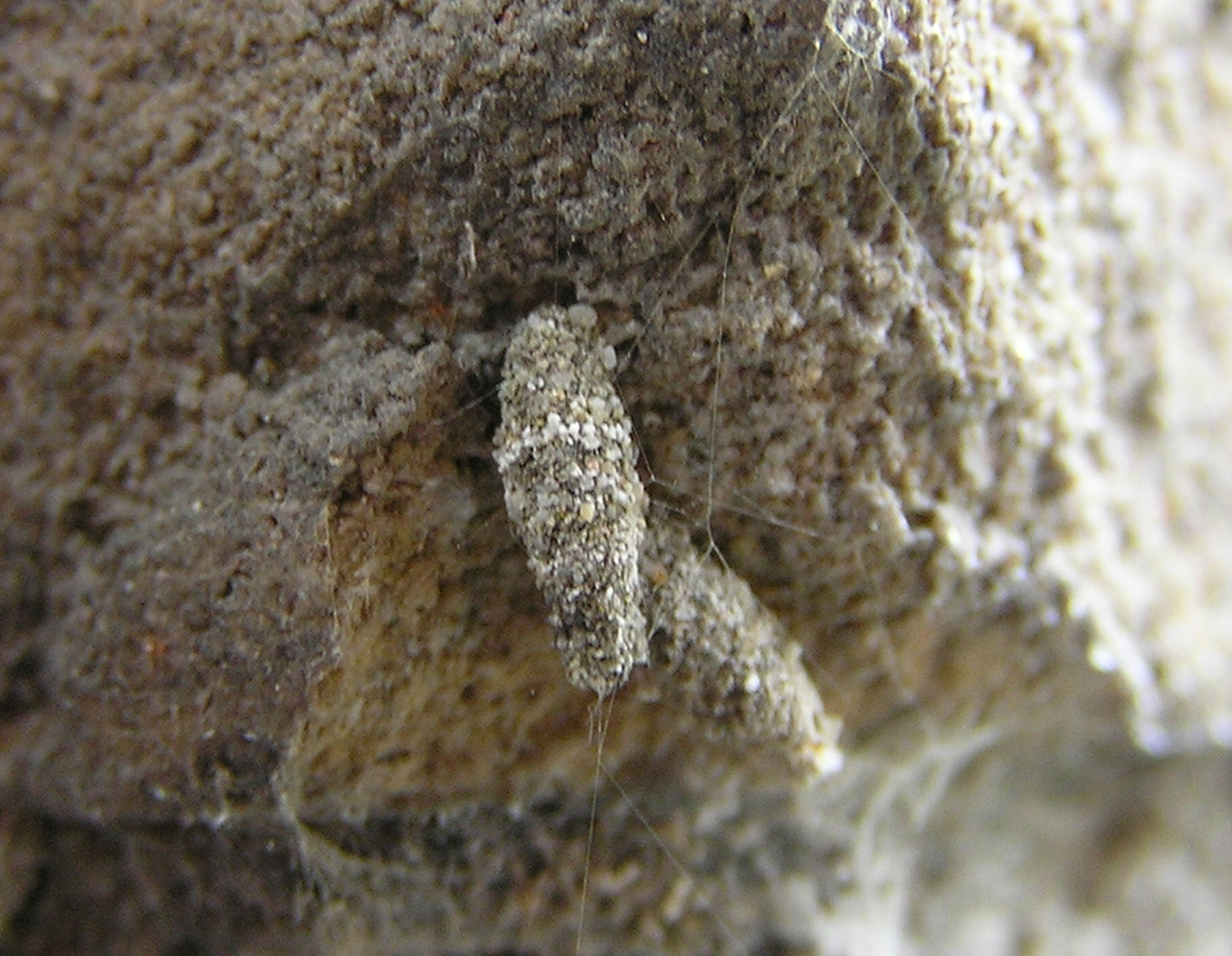
- Case

Scientific classification
- Kingdom: Animalia
- Phylum: Arthropoda
- Class: Insecta
- Order: Lepidoptera
- Family: Psychidae
- Genus: Luffia
- Species: L. lapidella

Binomial name
- Luffia lapidella Goeze, 1783

= Luffia lapidella =

Species of moth

Luffia lapidella is a moth of the Psychidae family found in Europe. It was first described by the German zoologist, Johann August Ephraim Goeze in 1783. The larvae live in cases and feed on lichens and the female moths are wingless.

== Life cycle ==
Imago

The moth flies from June to July depending on the location. Females are wingless and unable to fly. the males have wings although not all males can fly. L. lapidella has partial parthenogenesis.

Ovum

Eggs are laid in the case and hatch in four to five weeks.

Larva

The larvae live in cases and feed on algae and lichen. The cases are covered in lichen and sand, are conical, round in cross-section with a width of 2–3 mm (0.079–0.118 in)) and up to 5–7 mm (0.20–0.28 in)) long. They are found on tree trunks, rocks, walls and frames and have a preference for warm dry places. The caterpillar overwinters in the case and can be found from August to May. The case is at 90° to the substrate.

Pupa

Pupa can be found from May to June and are attached to the tree or rock where the larva was feeding.

=== Similar species ===
The cases are very similar to those of Luffia ferchaultella.

== Distribution ==
Luffia lapidella is found in Europe including Belgium, the Channel Islands (where it is common), France, Italy, The Netherlands, Spain, southern Switzerland and the United Kingdom. In the spring of 1981, males were found on the wall of a house in Marazion, Cornwall. More males were bred from larvae found within 0.5 miles (0.80 km) of the house. Similar cases have been found elsewhere in Cornwall, but the identification is uncertain without breeding the larvae.

== Taxonomy ==
The genus Luffia was erected by the British entomologist, James William Tutt in 1899, in honour of the Channel Island collector, W T Luff (1851–1910). The specific name lapidella was raised by Goeze in 1783 and is from the Latin lapis or lapidus for a stone; i.e. from the substrate on which the larvae feed on lichens.
