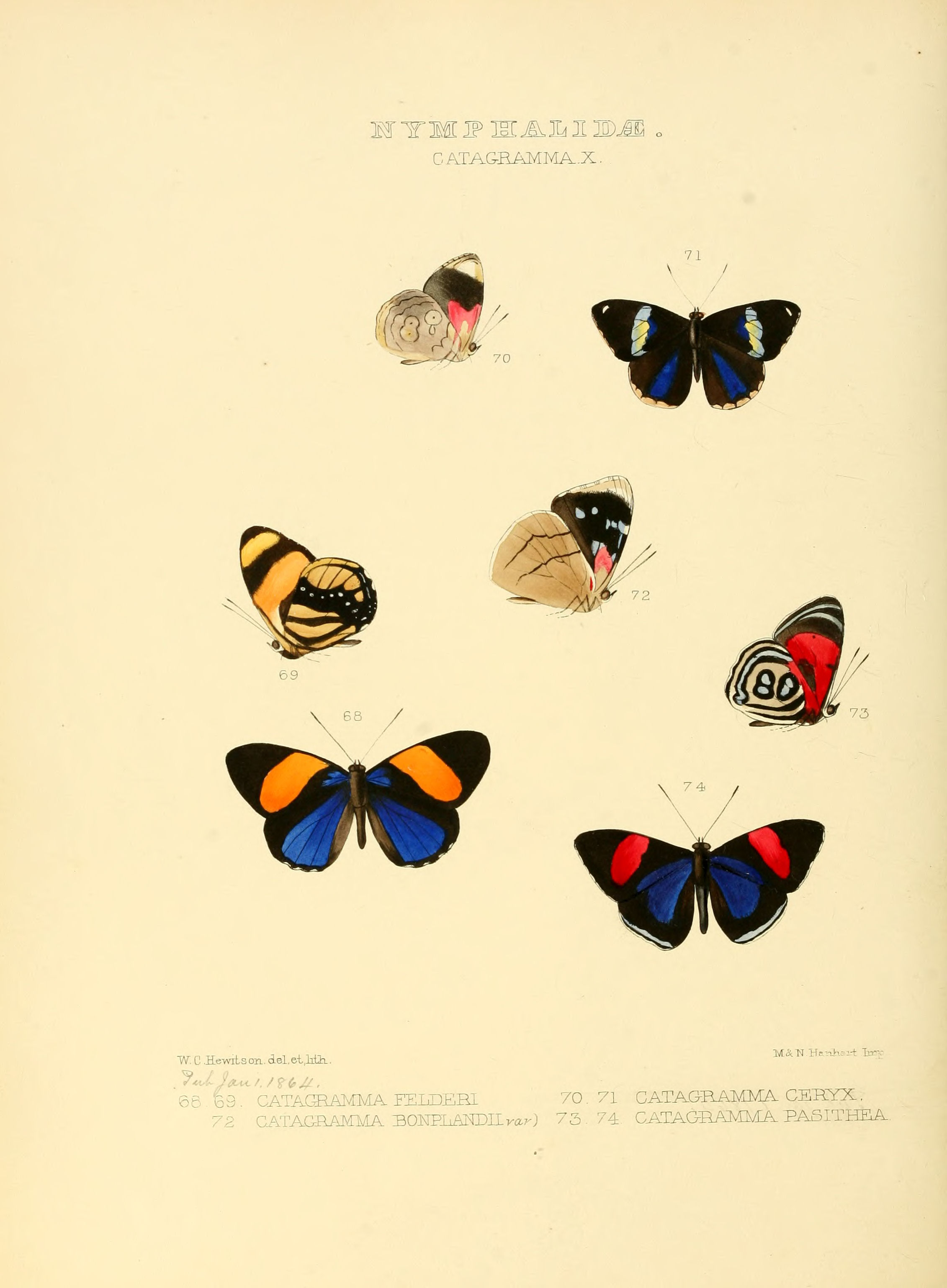
- Plate accompanying the original description

Scientific classification
- Kingdom: Animalia
- Phylum: Arthropoda
- Clade: Pancrustacea
- Class: Insecta
- Order: Lepidoptera
- Family: Nymphalidae
- Genus: Diaethria
- Species: D. ceryx

Binomial name
- Diaethria ceryx (Hewitson, [1864])

Synonyms
- Catagramma ceryx Hewitson, 1864

= Diaethria ceryx =

Species of butterfly

Diaethria ceryx, the Ceryx eighty-eight, is a species of butterfly of the genus Diaethria. Diaethria ceryx was recorded for the first time in the coastal mountains in Manabí, Ecuador.
