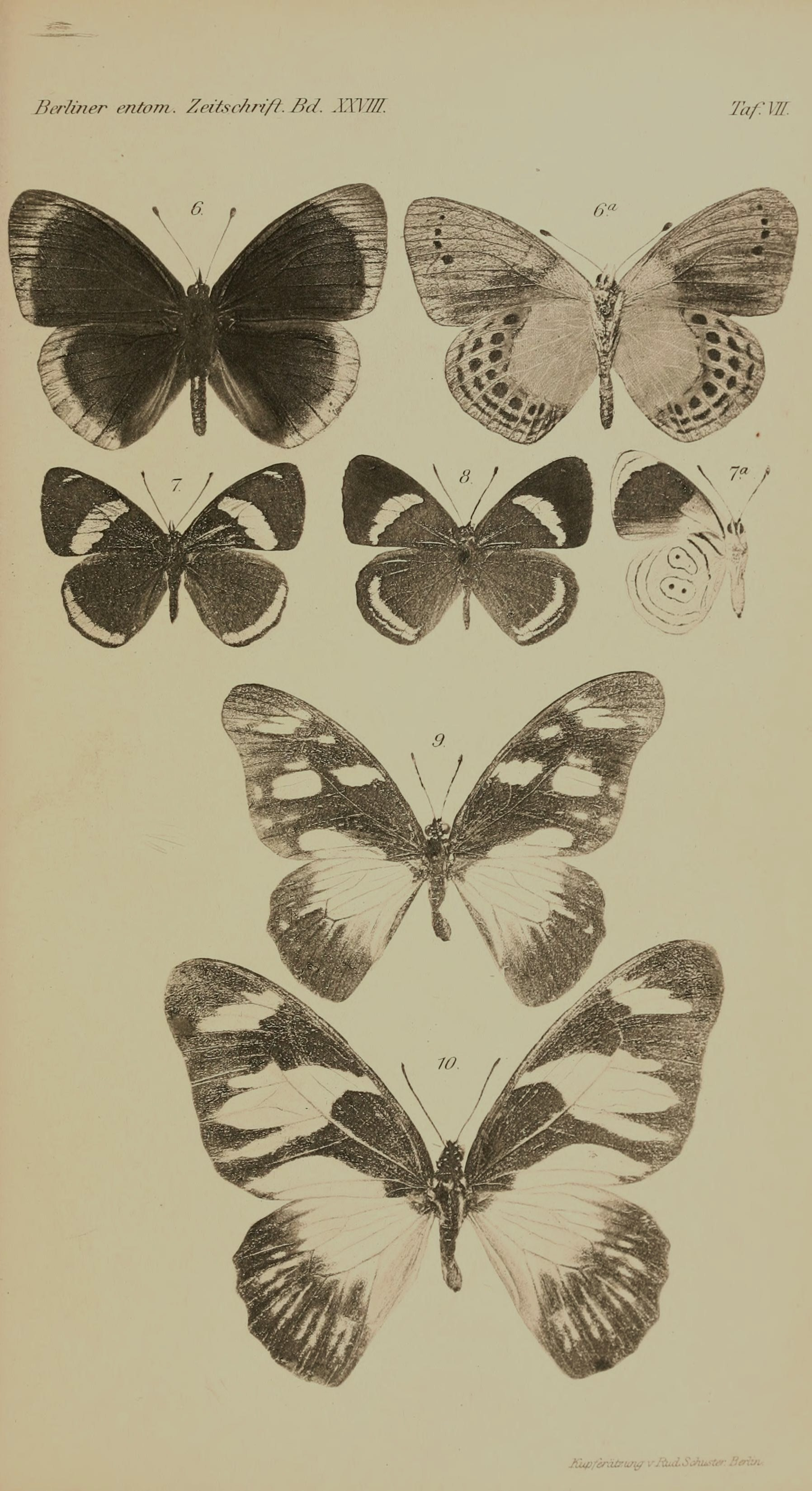
- D. n. panthalis figures 7 and 7a

Scientific classification
- Kingdom: Animalia
- Phylum: Arthropoda
- Clade: Pancrustacea
- Class: Insecta
- Order: Lepidoptera
- Family: Nymphalidae
- Genus: Diaethria
- Species: D. nystographa

Binomial name
- Diaethria nystographa (Guenée, 1872)

Synonyms
- Callicore nystographa Guenée, 1872; Catagramma nyctographa Becker, 1951; Callicore phlogea ab. hypoxantha Röber, 1927; Callicore nystographa panthalis Honrath, 1884; Callicore nystographa charis Oberthür, 1916

= Diaethria nystographa =

Species of butterfly

Diaethria nystographa is a species of butterfly of the genus Diaethria. It was described by Achille Guenée in 1872. It is found in Peru, Ecuador, Colombia and Venezuela.

== Subspecies ==
- D. n. nystographa (Ecuador)
- D. n. aliciae Neild, 1996 (Venezuela)
- D. n. charis (Oberthür, 1916) (Colombia)
- D. n. panthalis (Honrath, 1884) (Venezuela)
- D. n. perezi Lamas, 1995 (Peru, south-western Ecuador)
