= Proutia =

Scientific classification
- Domain: Eukaryota
- Kingdom: Animalia
- Phylum: Arthropoda
- Class: Insecta
- Order: Lepidoptera
- Family: Psychidae
- Subfamily: Psychinae
- Genus: Proutia; Tutt, 1899

Genus of moths

Proutia is a genus of moths belonging to the family Psychidae.

The genus was first described by Tutt in 1899.

The species of this genus are found in Europe, Japan and Northern America.

Species:

- Proutia norvegica (Heylaerts, 1882)
- Proutia nigripunctata Dierl, 1966
- Proutia betulina Zeller, 1839
- Proutia rotunda Suomalainen, 1990
- Proutia breviserrata Sieder, 1963
- Proutia reticulatella Bruand, 1853
- Proutia comitella Bruand, 1853
- Proutia raiblensis Mann, 1870
- Proutia maculatella Saigusa & Sugimoto, 2014
- Proutia nigra Saigusa & Sugimoto, 2014
- Proutia tshatkalica Solyanikov, 1991
- Proutia sichotealinica Solyanikov, 1981
- Proutia talgarica Solyanikov, 1991
- Proutia temirlikensis Weidlich, 2006
- Proutia bogutica Solyanikov, 2000
- Proutia carpatica Weidlich, 2017
- Proutia caucasica Solyanikov, 1991
- Proutia chinensis Hättenschwiler & Chao, 1990
- Proutia elongatella Kozhanchikov, 1956
- Proutia cornucervae Roh & Lee, 2023
