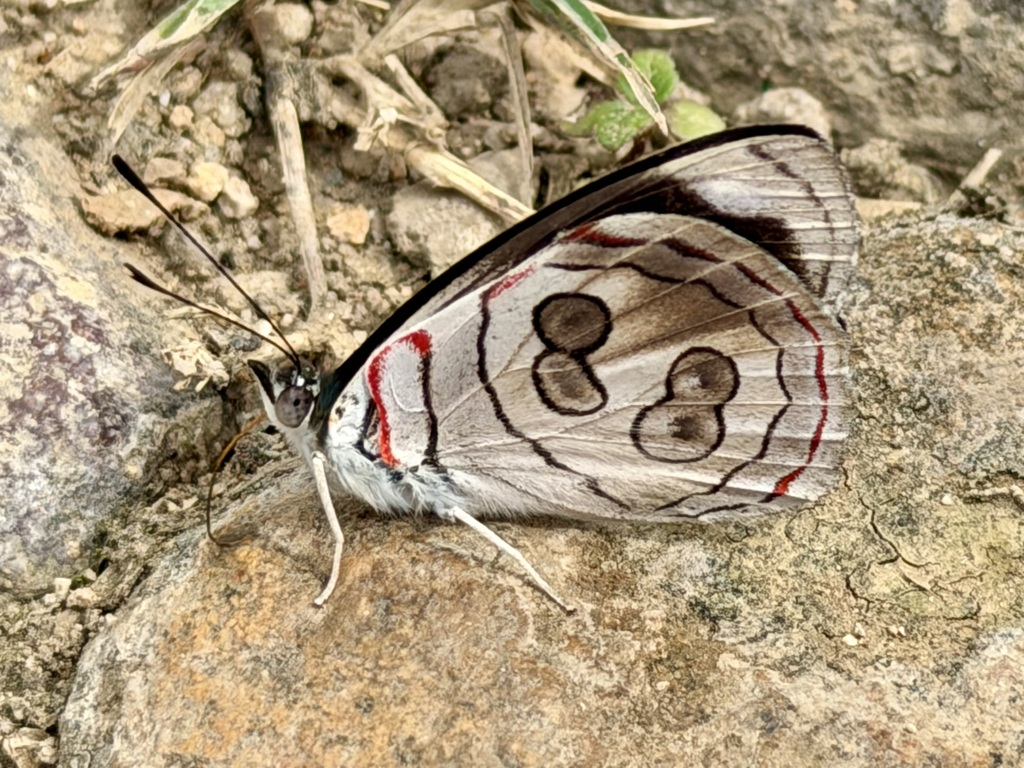

Scientific classification
- Kingdom: Animalia
- Phylum: Arthropoda
- Clade: Pancrustacea
- Class: Insecta
- Order: Lepidoptera
- Family: Nymphalidae
- Genus: Diaethria
- Species: D. bacchis

Binomial name
- Diaethria bacchis (Doubleday, 1849)

Synonyms
- Cybdelis bacchis Doubleday, 1849; Cyclogramma bimaculata Hewitson, 1867

= Diaethria bacchis =

Species of butterfly

Diaethria bacchis is a species of butterfly of the genus Diaethria. It was described by Edward Doubleday in 1849. It is found in Mexico.
