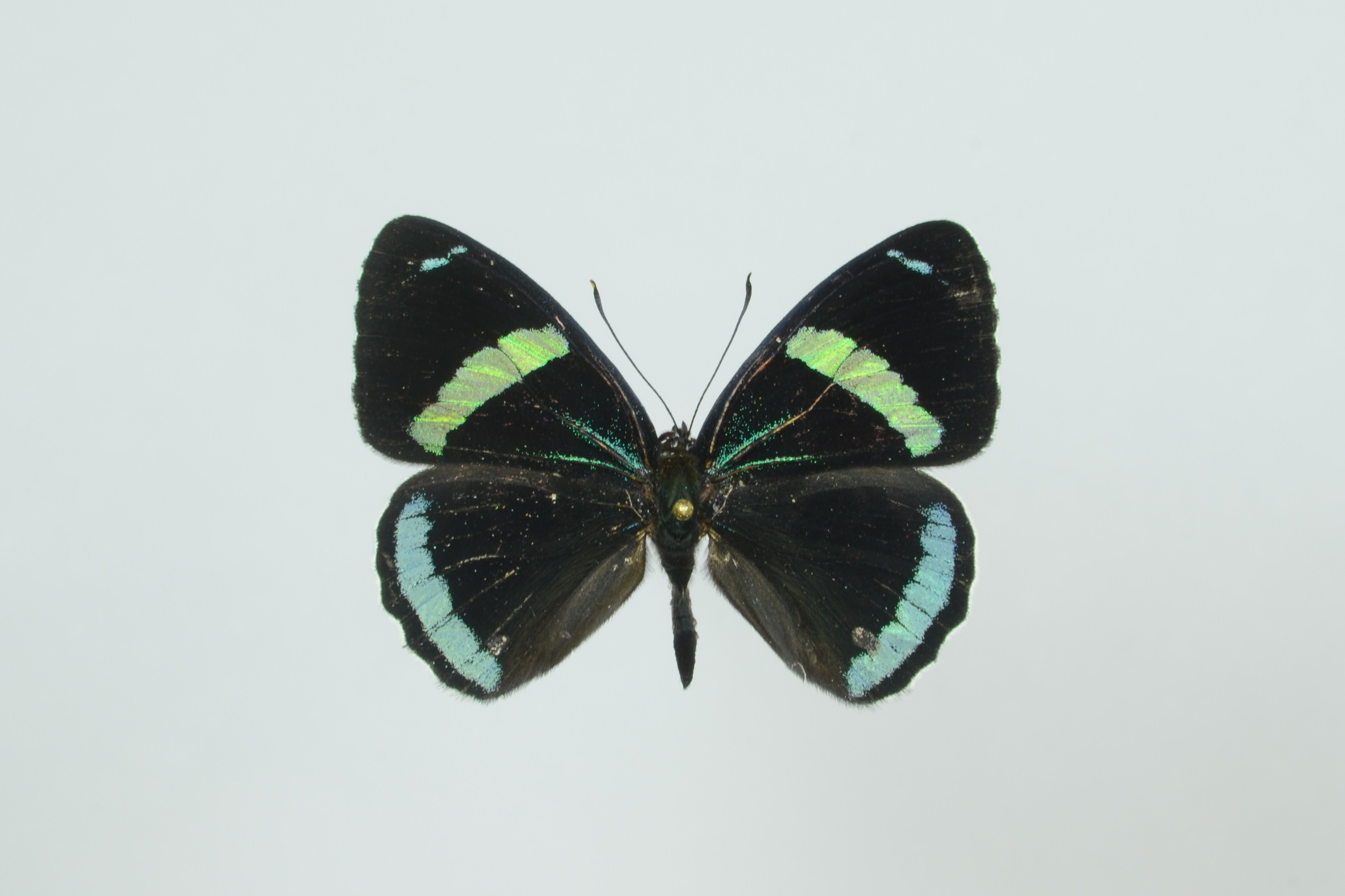
- Dorsal view
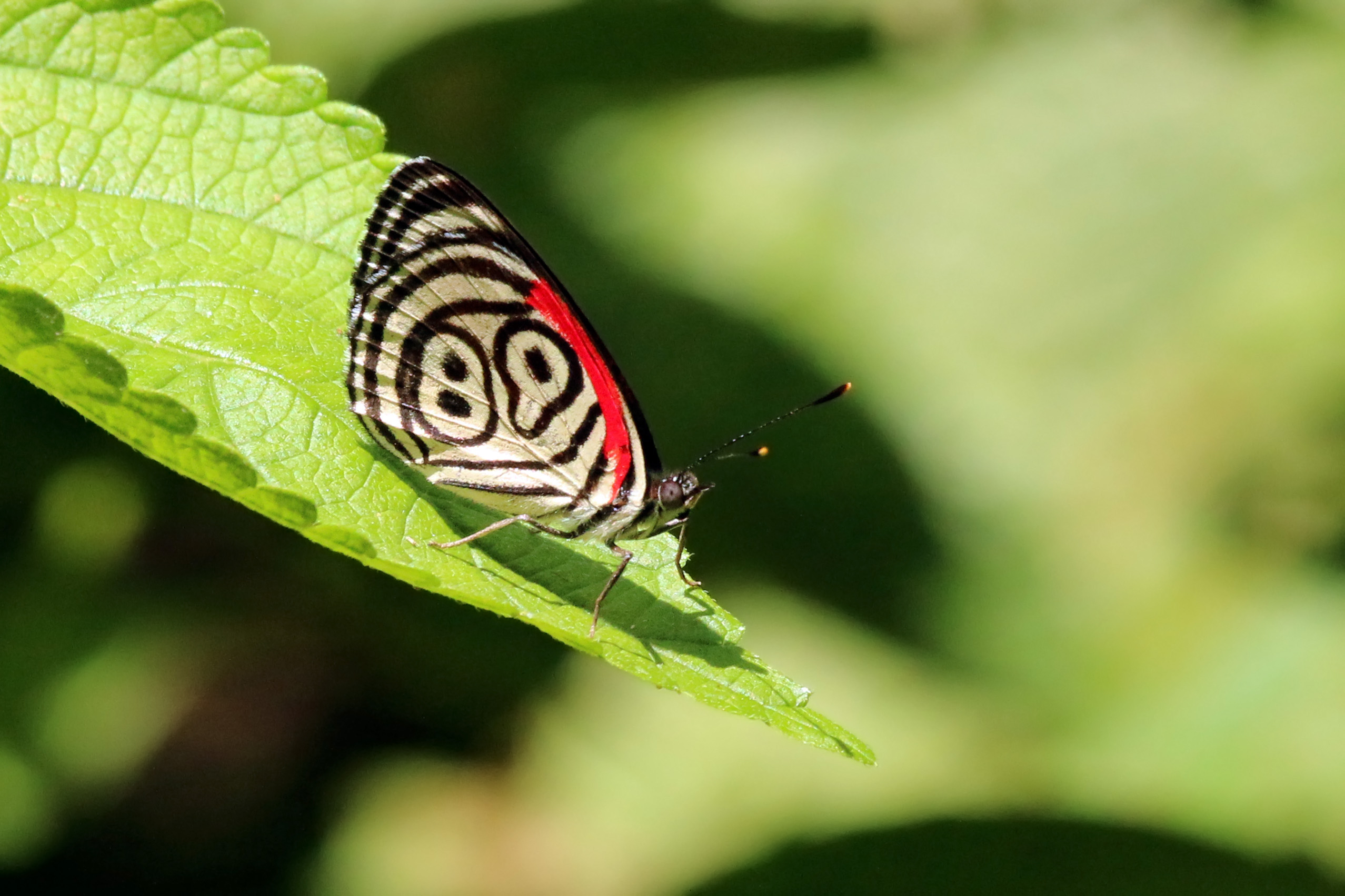
- D. c. juani (ventral view), Trinidad

Scientific classification
- Kingdom: Animalia
- Phylum: Arthropoda
- Clade: Pancrustacea
- Class: Insecta
- Order: Lepidoptera
- Family: Nymphalidae
- Genus: Diaethria
- Species: D. clymena

Binomial name
- Diaethria clymena (Cramer, [1775])

Subspecies
- 13, see text

Synonyms
- Papilio clymena Cramer, [1775]; Najas chlymene Hübner, [1818]; Catagramma marchalii Guérin-Méneville, [1844]; Callicore marchalii; Diaethria marchalii; Callicore lyde d'Almeida, 1934; Diaethria janeira; Callicore elinda Guenée, 1872; Callicore seropa Guenée, 1872; Callicore flava Vogeler, 1935; Callicore extrema Vogeler, 1935; Diaethria meridionalis; Catagramma branickii Oberthür, 1883; Catagramma bourcieri Boisduval, 1870; Catagramma dodone Doubleday, [1845]; Diaethria dodone; Callicore beleses Godman & Salvin, 1889

= Diaethria clymena =

Cramer's eighty-eight

Species of butterfly

Diaethria clymena, the Cramer's eighty-eight, is a species of butterfly of the family Nymphalidae. It is found from Mexico to Peru and Brazil. It was described to science by Pieter Cramer, in a fascicle of De uitlandsche Kapellen, 1775.

The wingspan is about 30–40 millimetres (1.2–1.6 in).

The larvae feed on Trema lamarckiana, Trema micrantha, and Theobroma.

== Subspecies ==
Listed alphabetically.

- D. c. aurelia (Guenée, 1872)
- D. c. beleses (Godman & Salvin, 1889) (Panama)
- D. c. bourcieri (Guenée, 1872) (Ecuador)
- D. c. clymena (Guyana, Brazil (Amazonas))
- D. c. colombiana (Viette, 1958) (Colombia)
- D. c. consobrina (Guérin-Méneville, [1844]) (Colombia, Venezuela)
- D. c. dodone (Guenée, 1872) (Colombia)
- D. c. janeira (C. Felder, 1862) (Brazil (Rio de Janeiro, São Paulo), Paraguay)
- D. c. juani Neild, 1996 (Venezuela, Trinidad)
- D. c. marchalii (Guérin-Méneville, [1844]) (Nicaragua to Colombia)
- D. c. meridionalis (Bates, 1864) (Brazil (Rio Grande do Sul, Santa Catarina))
- D. c. peruviana (Guenée, 1872) (Peru, Bolivia, Ecuador)
- D. c. seropina (Röber, 1924) (Brazil (Pará))
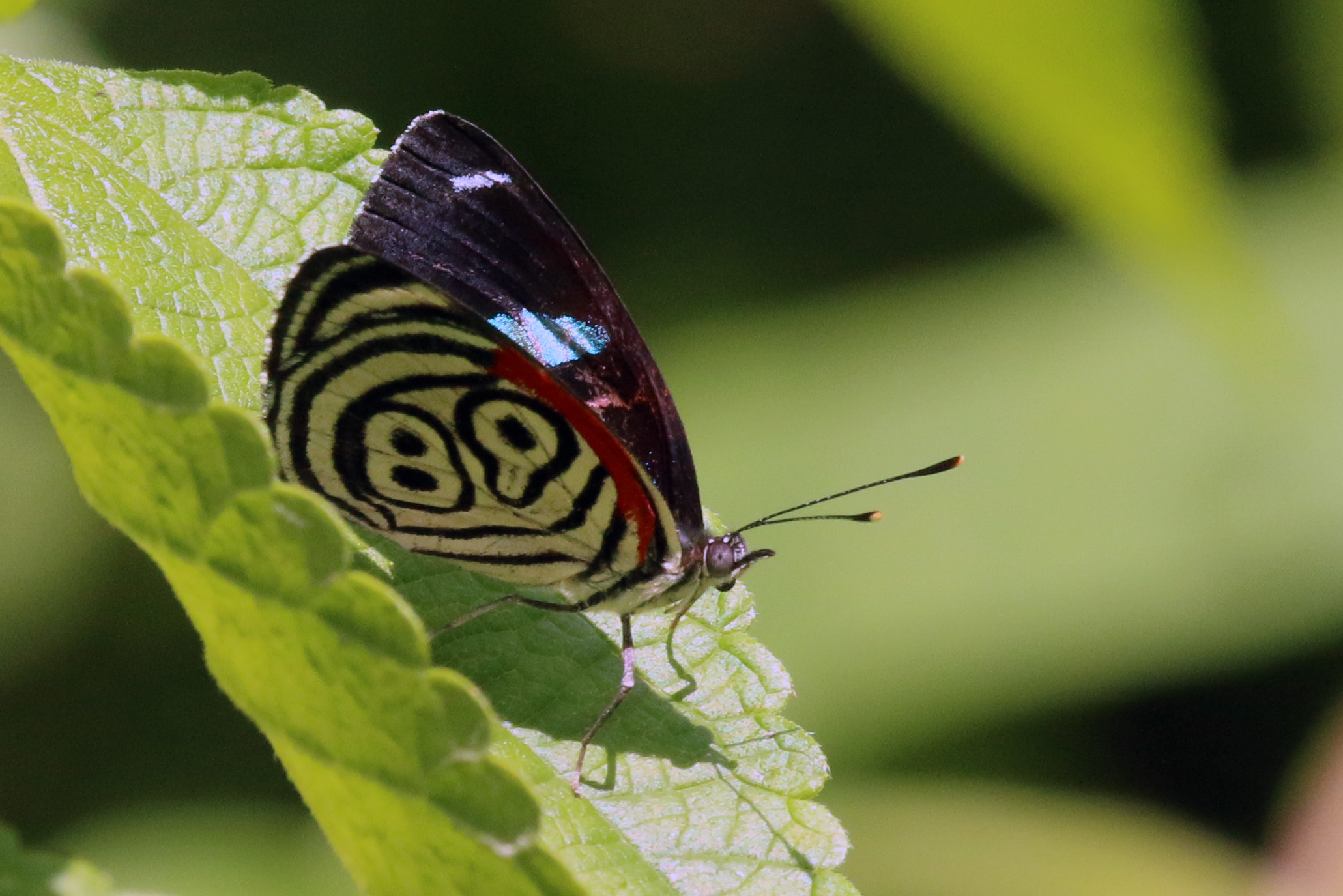
D. c. juani, Trinidad

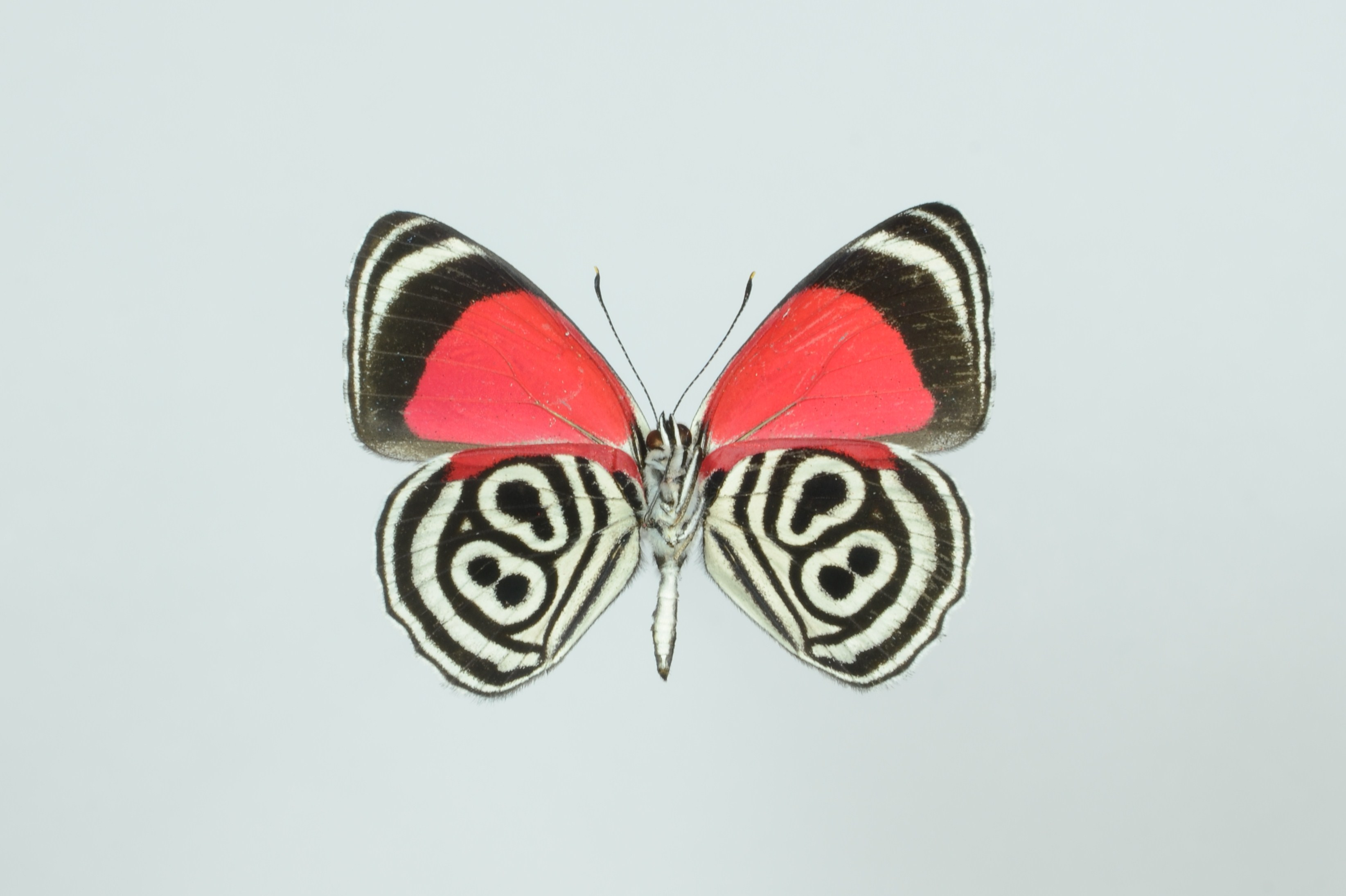
ventral

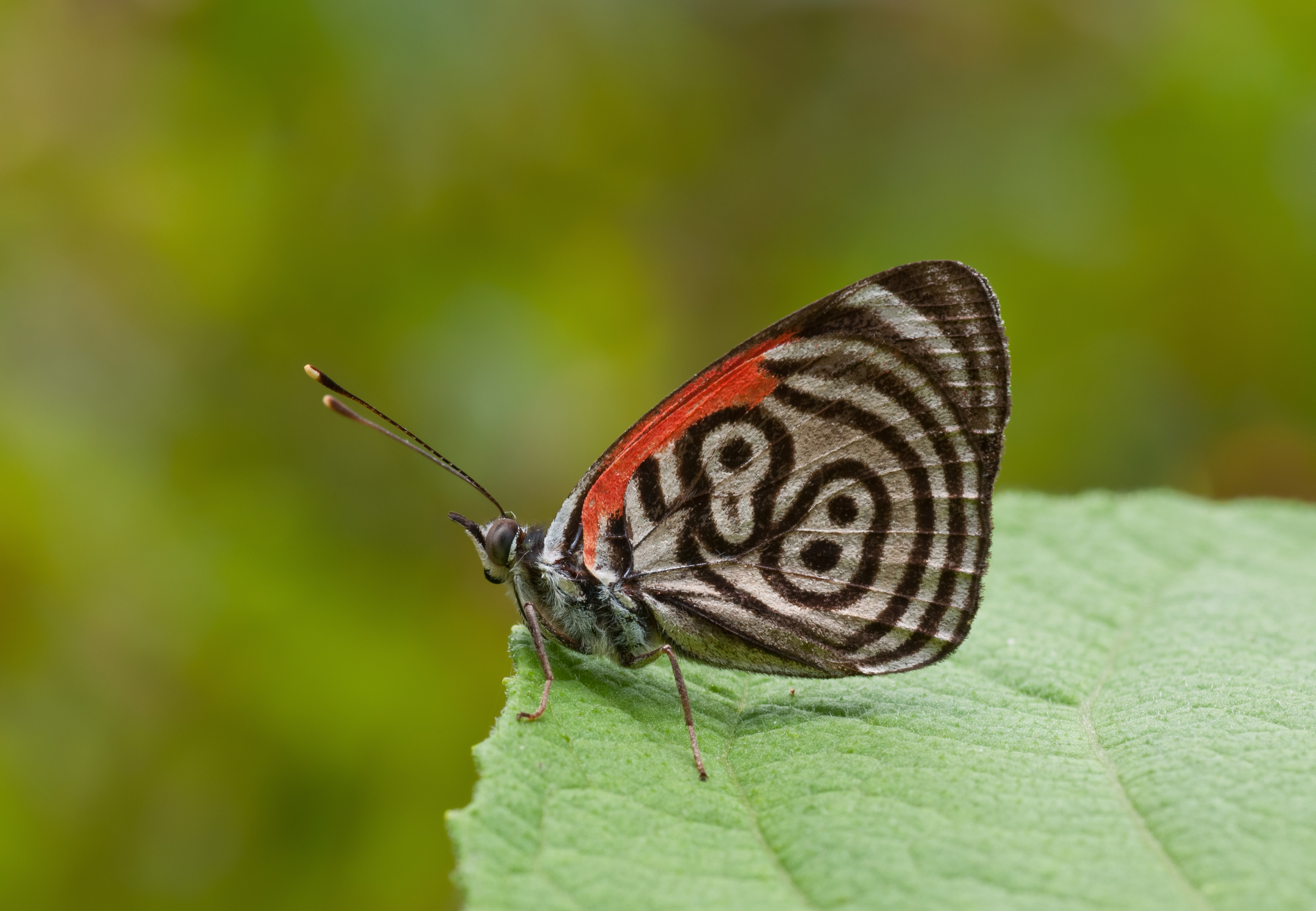
D. c. marchalii, Venezuela

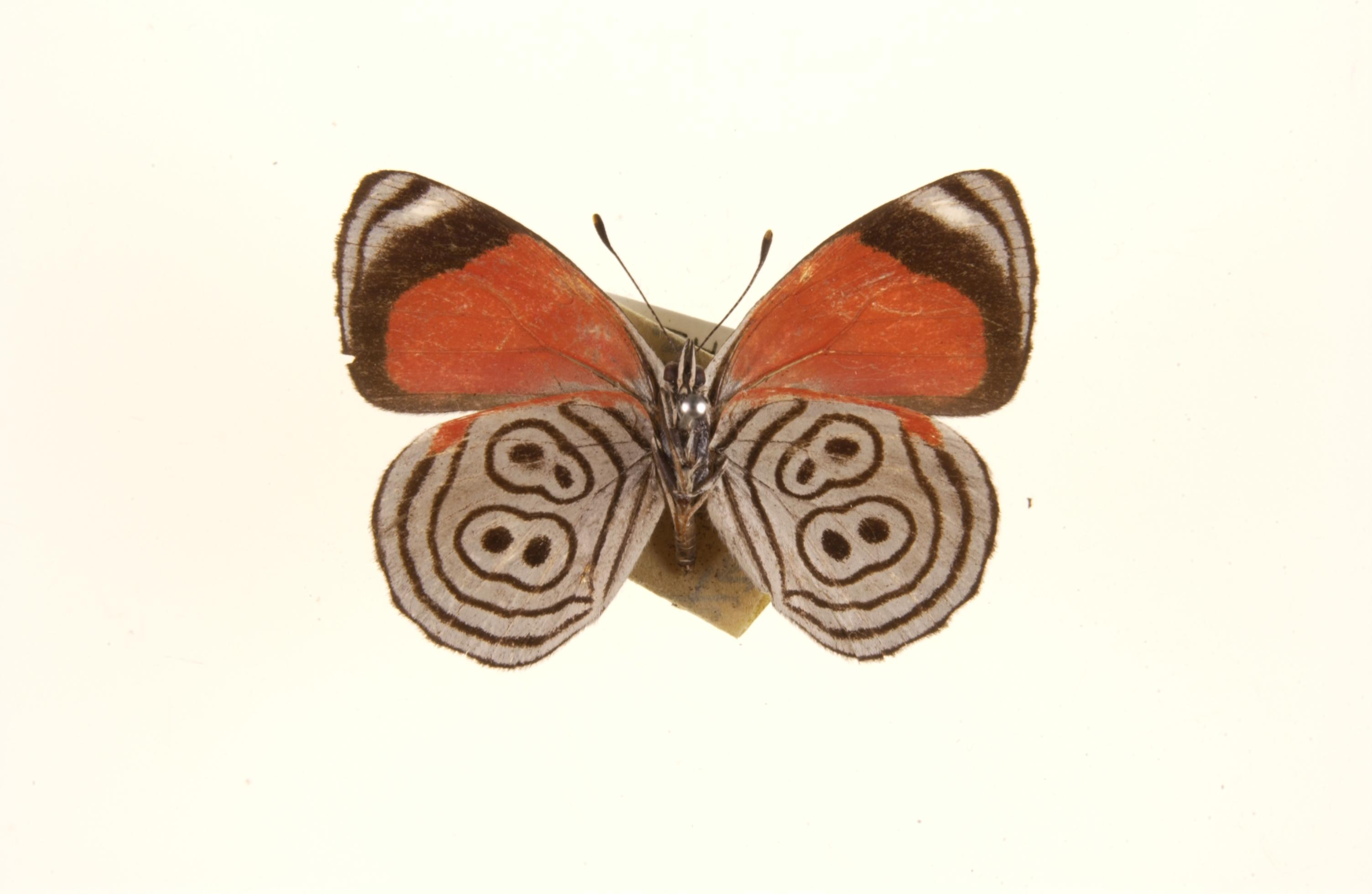
D. c. meridionalis
