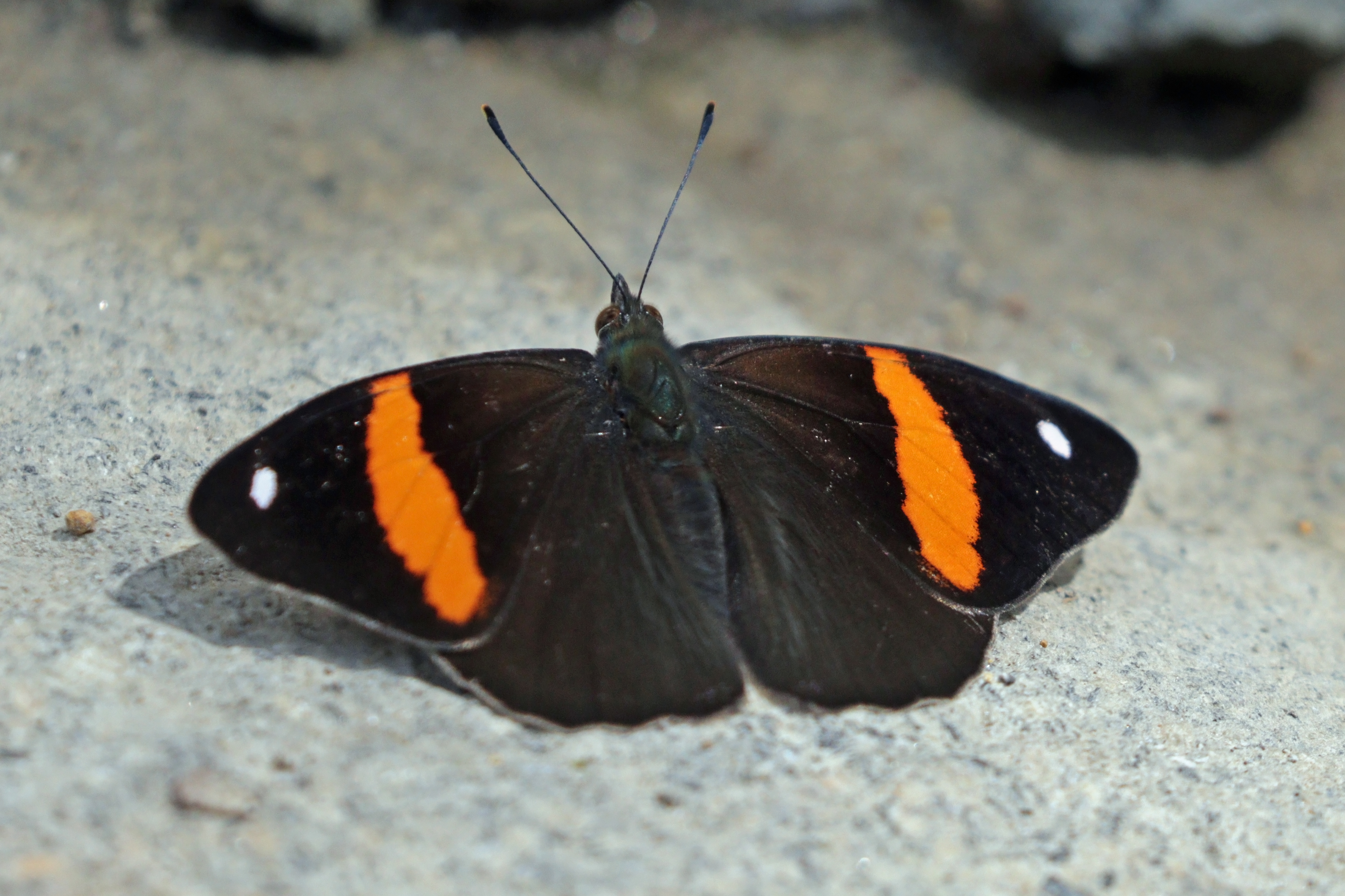

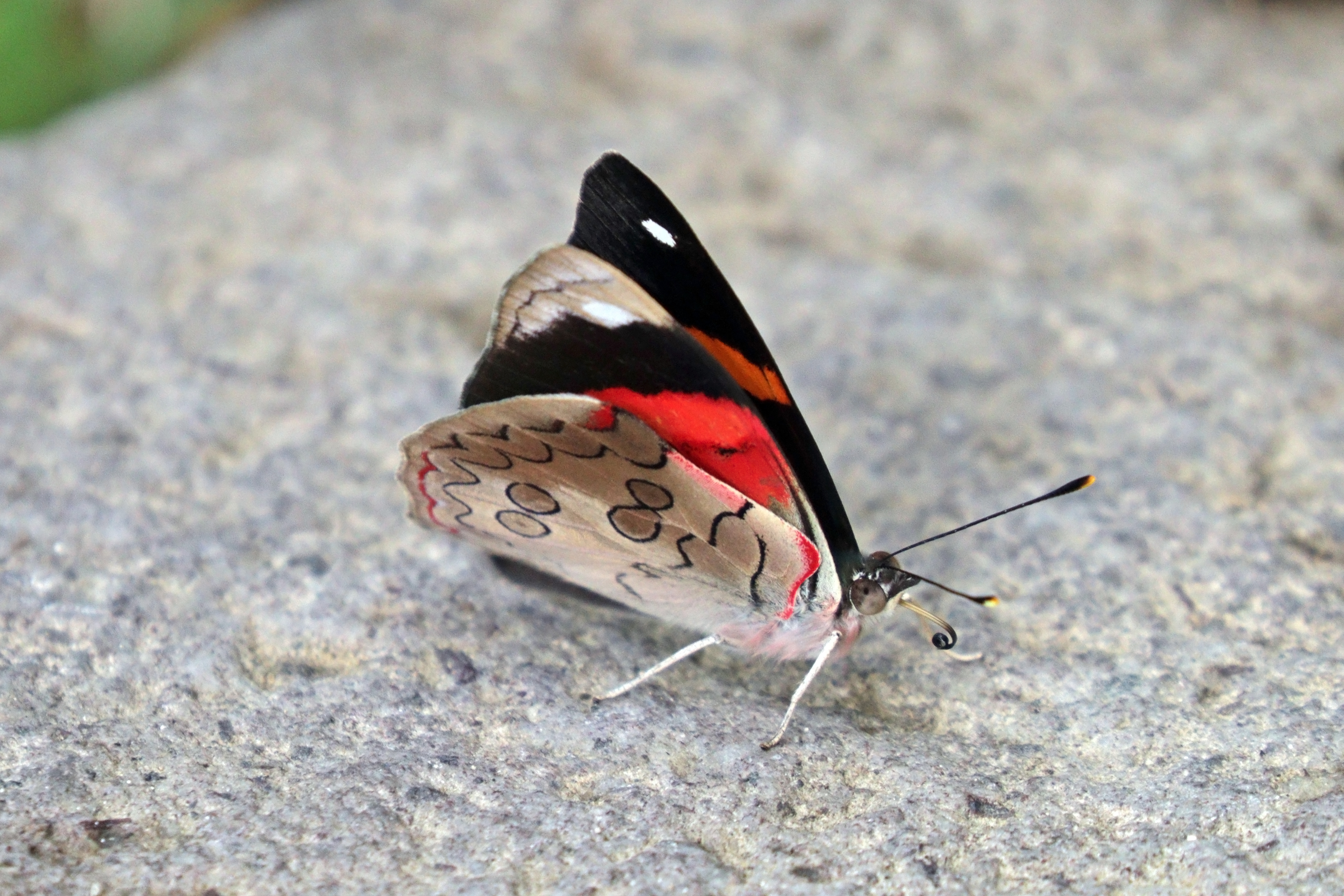
- both in Panama

Scientific classification
- Kingdom: Animalia
- Phylum: Arthropoda
- Clade: Pancrustacea
- Class: Insecta
- Order: Lepidoptera
- Family: Nymphalidae
- Genus: Diaethria
- Species: D. pandama

Binomial name
- Diaethria pandama (Doubleday, [1848])

Synonyms
- Cyclogramma pandama Doubleday, [1848]

= Diaethria pandama =

Species of butterfly

Diaethria pandama is a species of butterfly of the genus Diaethria. It was described by Edward Doubleday in 1848. It is found from Mexico to Panama.

The larvae feed on Serjania species.
