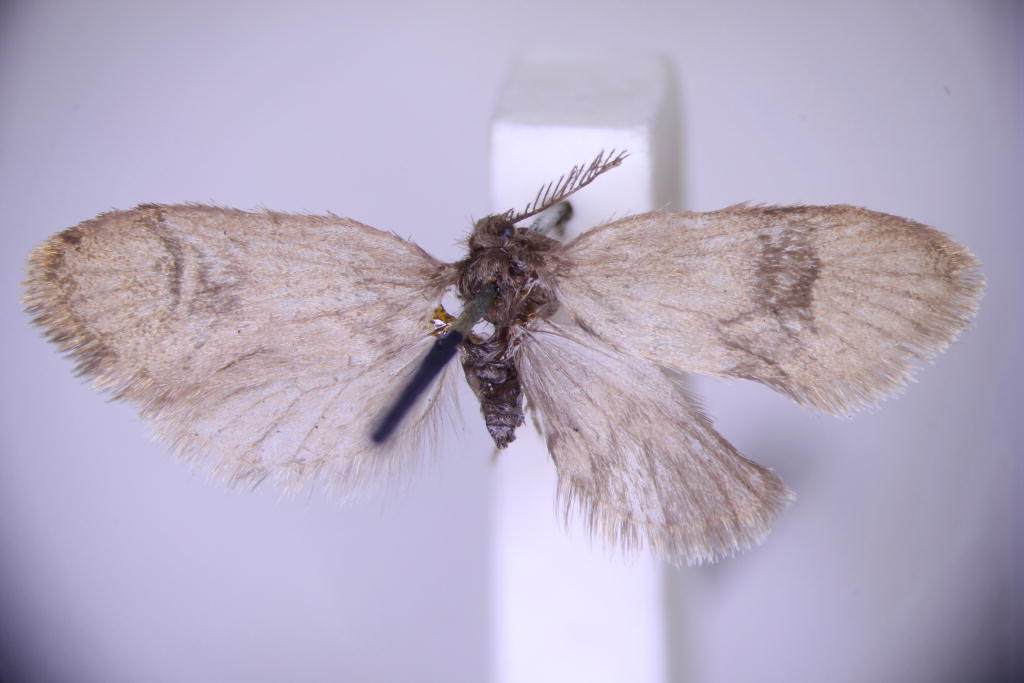

Scientific classification
- Kingdom: Animalia
- Phylum: Arthropoda
- Clade: Pancrustacea
- Class: Insecta
- Order: Lepidoptera
- Family: Psychidae
- Genus: Proutia
- Species: P. betulina

Binomial name
- Proutia betulina (Zeller, 1839)

= Proutia betulina =

Species of moth

Proutia betulina is a species of moth of the family Psychidae described by Philipp Christoph Zeller in 1839.
