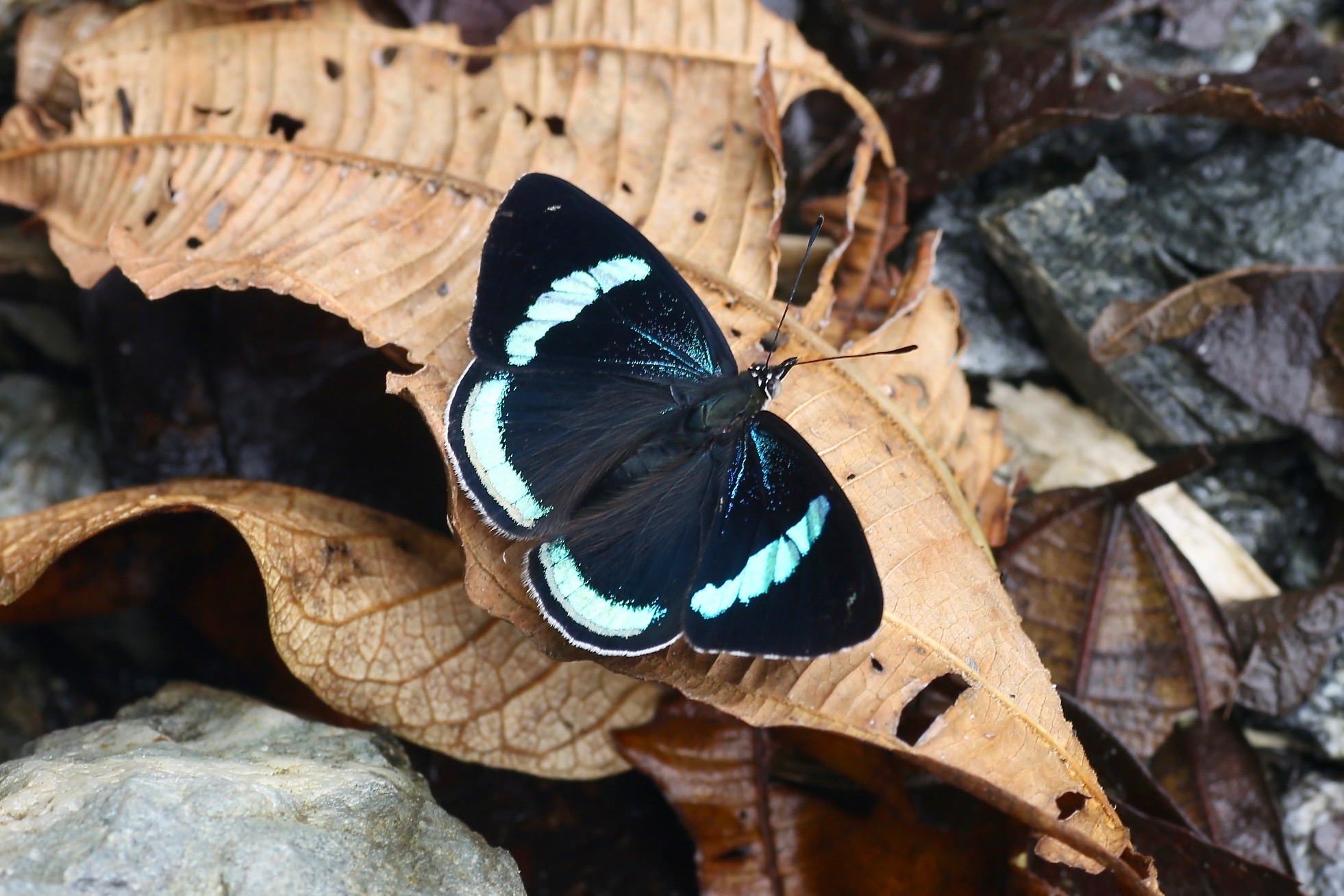
- Diaethria n. neglecta, male's uppersides
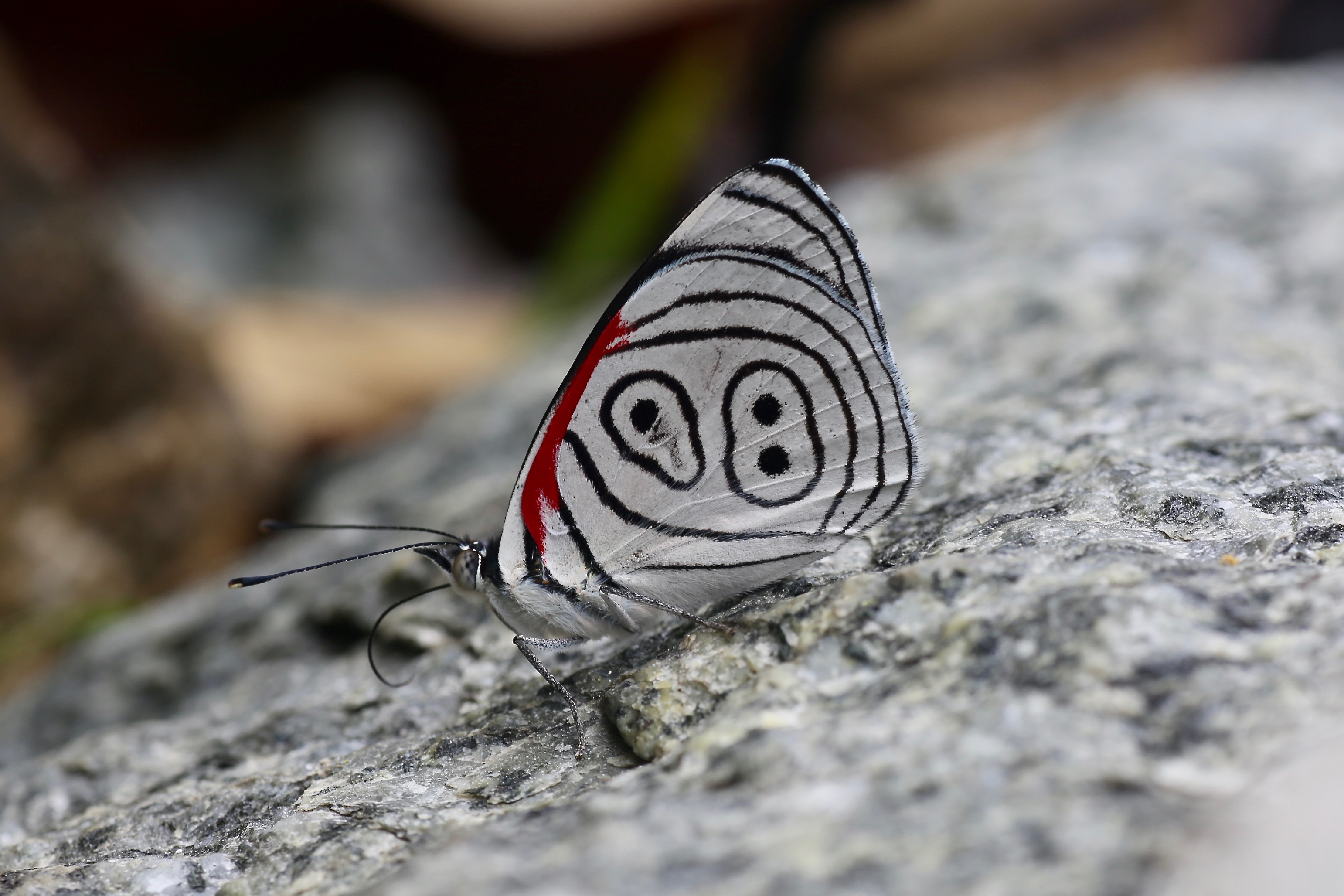
- Diaethria n. neglecta, male's hindwing underside

Scientific classification
- Kingdom: Animalia
- Phylum: Arthropoda
- Clade: Pancrustacea
- Class: Insecta
- Order: Lepidoptera
- Family: Nymphalidae
- Genus: Diaethria
- Species: D. neglecta

Binomial name
- Diaethria neglecta (Salvin, 1869)

Synonyms
- Callicore neglecta Salvin, 1869; Callicore granatensis Guenée, 1872; Callicore nitens Oberthür, 1916; Callicore difascia d'Almeida, 1931; Callicore neglecta merida Honrath, 1884

= Diaethria neglecta =

Species of butterfly

Diaethria neglecta is a species of butterfly of the genus Diaethria. It was described by Osbert Salvin in 1869. It is found in Bolivia, Peru, Ecuador, Colombia and Venezuela. All Diaethria species are commonly called eighty-eights because of the patterns on the hindwing undersides.

== Subspecies ==
- D. n. neglecta (Bolivia, Peru, Ecuador, Colombia)
- D. n. merida (Honrath, 1884) (Venezuela)

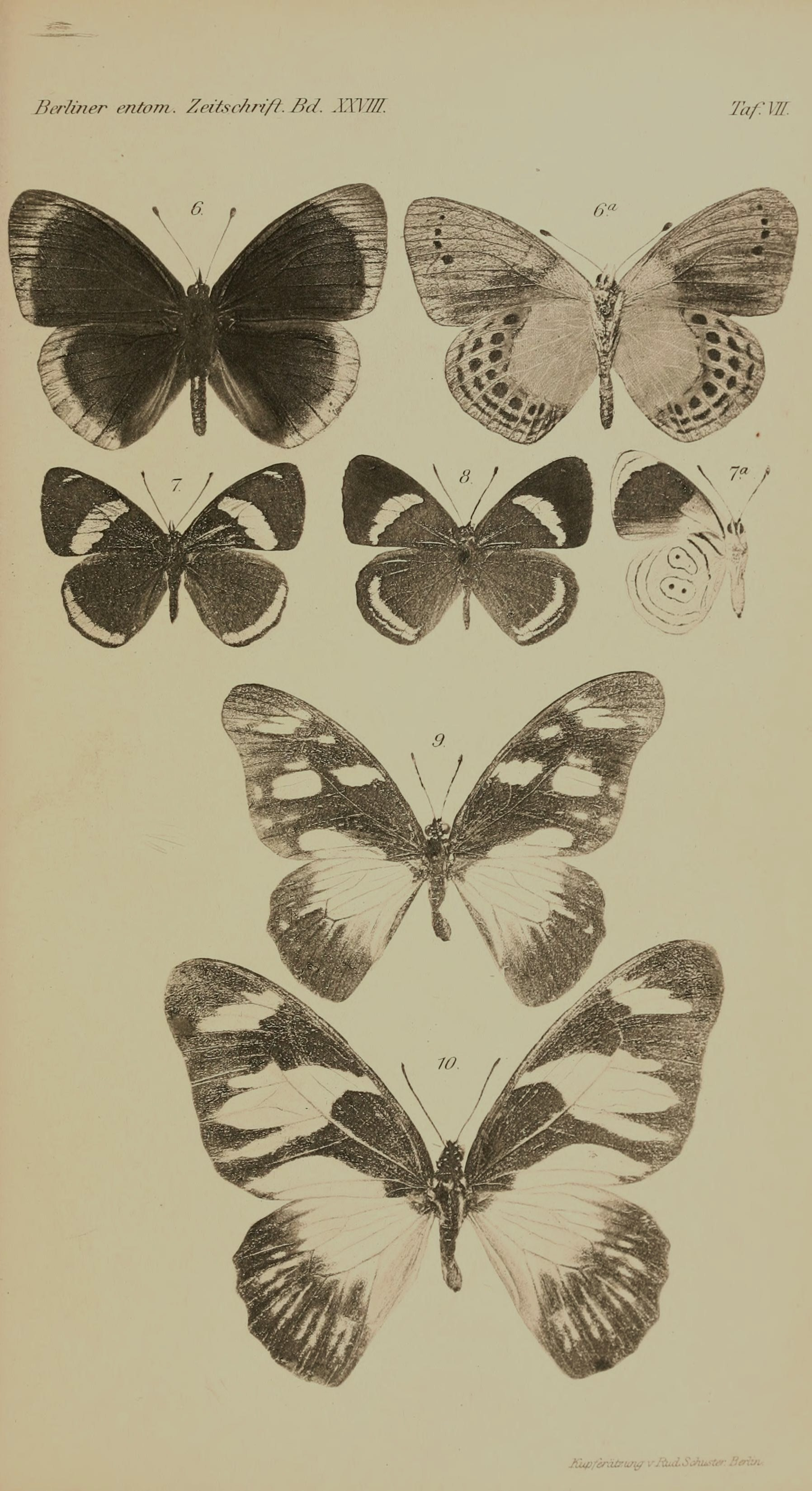
D. n. merida – figure 8

== Description ==
The wingspan of Diaethria neglecta is about 38 millimetres (1.5 in).

The uppersides is black, marked on the forewings with a diagonal band of metallic blue or green. The colour is repeated on the hindwings in the form of a submarginal band. The hindwing undersides pattern consists of black dots surrounded by concentric white and black lines, and looks like the number "89" or "98".

== Habitats and distribution ==
This common species occurs from Panama to Bolivia at elevations of 200–1700 m, in rain- and cloudforests where the larval foodplant Trema (Cannabaceae) grows.
