= Astala (moth) =

Scientific classification
- Kingdom: Animalia
- Phylum: Arthropoda
- Class: Insecta
- Order: Lepidoptera
- Family: Psychidae
- Subfamily: Psychinae
- Genus: Astala; Davis, 1964

Genus of moths

Astala is a genus of bagworm moths in the family Psychidae. There are about seven described species in Astala. Individuals of the astala genus often have a wingspan of 1,6-2 centimeters and a length of 0,7-1 centimeter.

== Species ==
These seven species belong to the genus Astala:

- Astala confederata Grote & Robinson, 1868^{c g b}
- Astala edwardsi Heylaerts, 1884^{c g b}
- Astala hoffmanni Vazquez, 1941^{c g}
- Astala polingi Barnes & Benjamin, 1924^{c g}
- Astala tristis Schaus, 1901^{c g}
- Astala vigasia Schaus, 1901^{c g}
- Astala zacualpania Dyar, 1917^{c g}

Data sources: i = ITIS, c = Catalogue of Life, g = GBIF, b = Bugguide.net
