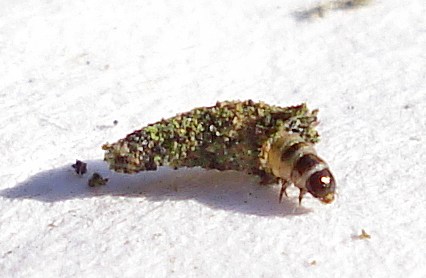
- Luffia ferchaultella case and larva

Scientific classification
- Kingdom: Animalia
- Phylum: Arthropoda
- Class: Insecta
- Order: Lepidoptera
- Family: Psychidae
- Tribe: Luffiini
- Genus: Luffia; Tutt, 1899

Species
- Luffia ferchaultella Stephens, 1850; Luffia lapidella Goeze, 1783; Luffia maggiella Chapman, 1901; Luffia rebeli Walsingham, 1907

= Luffia =

Genus of moths

Luffia is a genus of moths belonging to the family Psychidae and are found in Europe. Species are either bisexual with apterous (i.e.wingless) females or parthenogenetic where the larva develops from an egg without fertilisation.

== Description ==
Males have a wingspan of 7–12 millimetres (0.28–0.47 in) and antenna with 18–24 segments, while the females are wingless and have 6–10 segments on the antenna. Larva live within a case, and pupation and emergence also take place in the case, with the exuviae remaining within. The female moves through the rear opening of the case for mating and lays her eggs in the case.

== Taxonomy ==
The genus, Luffia was erected by the British entomologist James William Tutt in 1899, in honour of the Channel Island collecter, W T Luff (1851–1910). The moth Luffia lapidella is common on the Channel Islands.
