= Proutia norvegica =

Scientific classification
- Domain: Eukaryota
- Kingdom: Animalia
- Phylum: Arthropoda
- Class: Insecta
- Order: Lepidoptera
- Family: Psychidae
- Genus: Proutia
- Species: P. norvegica

Binomial name
- Proutia norvegica (Heylaerts, 1882)

Species of moth

Proutia norvegica is a species of moth belonging to the family Psychidae.

It is native to Northern Europe.

Synonym:

- Anaproutia norvegica (Heylaerts, 1882) 2011
