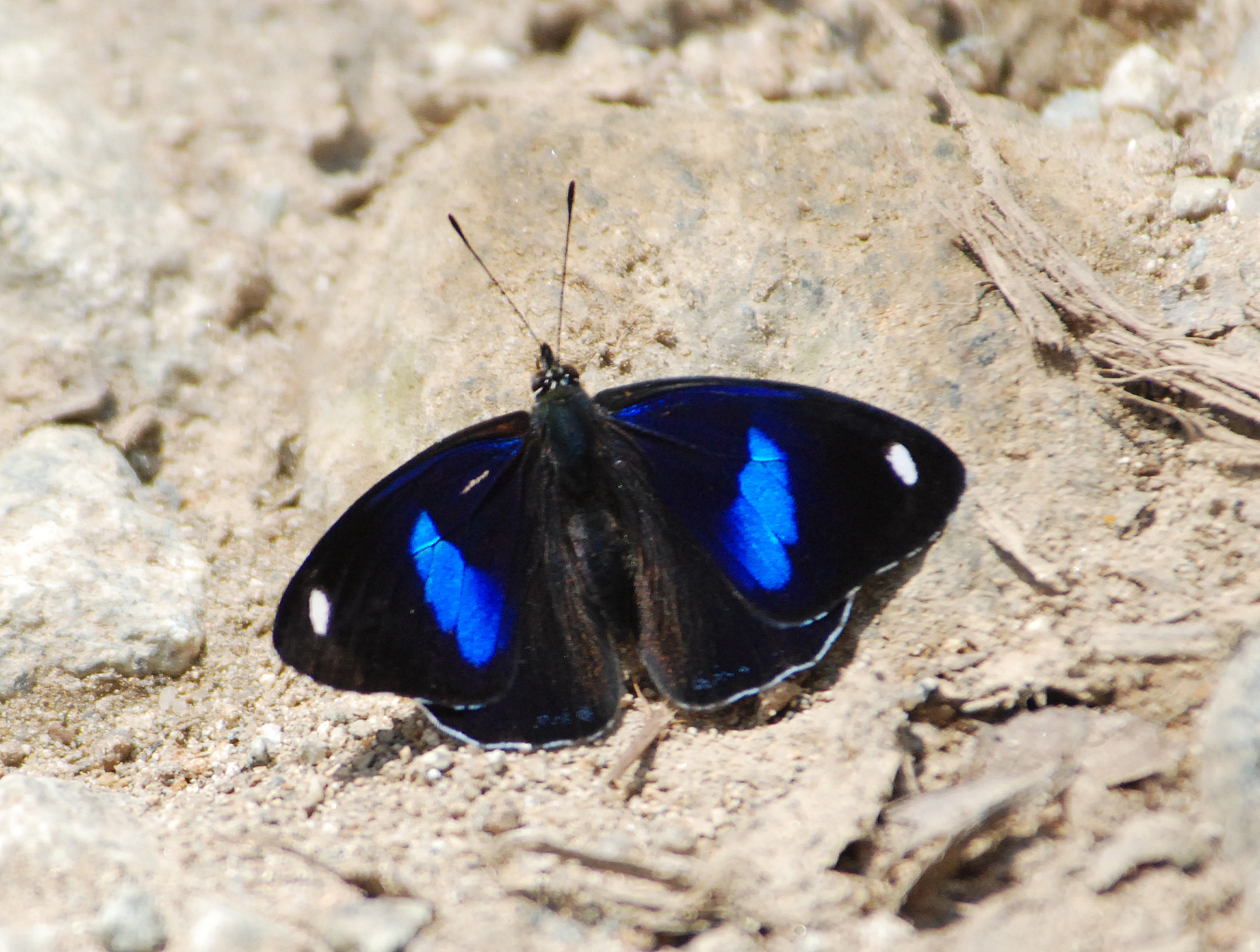

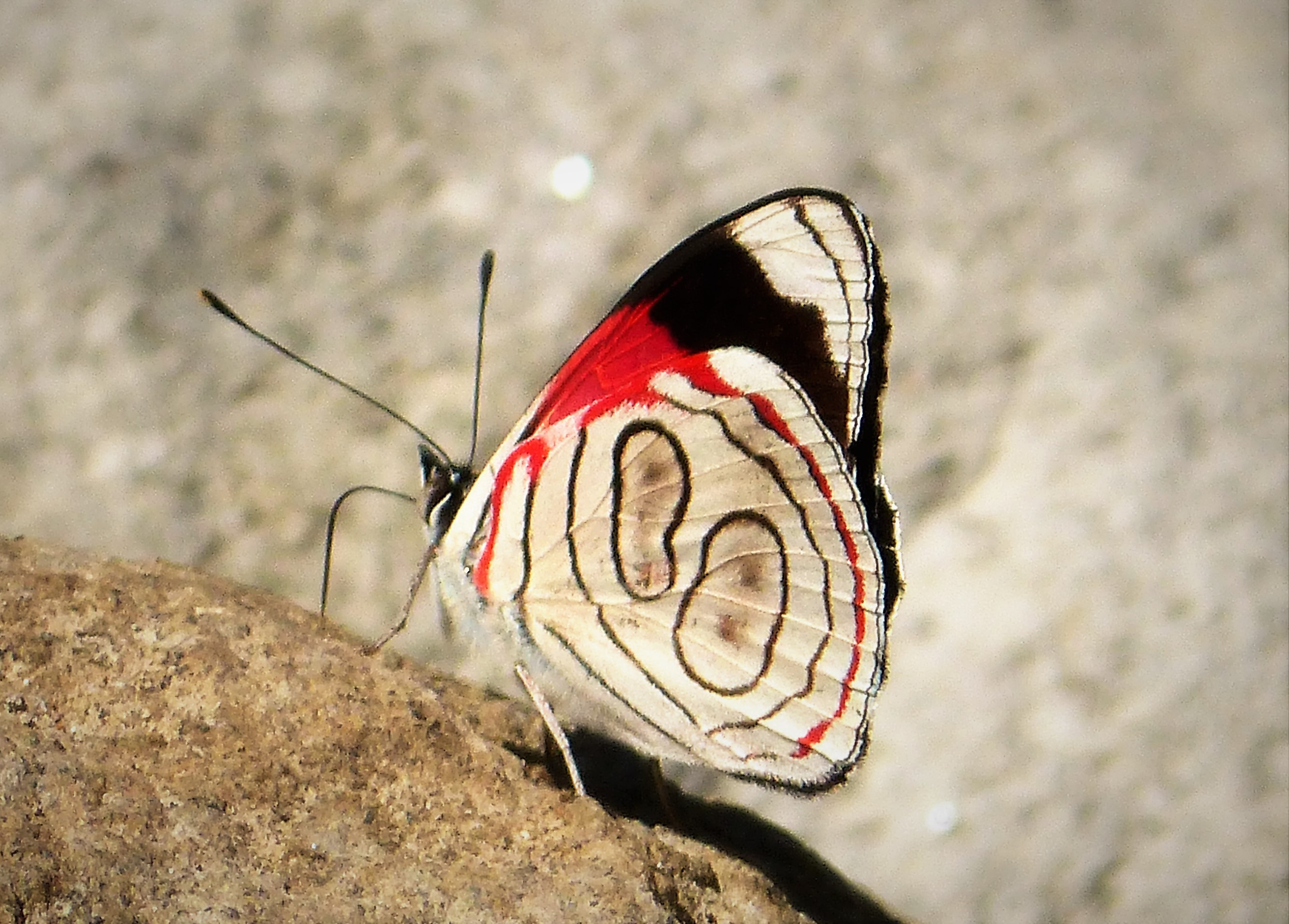

Scientific classification
- Kingdom: Animalia
- Phylum: Arthropoda
- Clade: Pancrustacea
- Class: Insecta
- Order: Lepidoptera
- Family: Nymphalidae
- Genus: Diaethria
- Species: D. astala

Binomial name
- Diaethria astala (Guérin-Méneville, 1844)

Synonyms
- Catagramma astala Guérin-Méneville, [1844]; Callicore astala; Callicore cornelia Herrich-Schäffer, [1850]; Callicore asteria Godman & Salvin, 1894

= Diaethria astala =

Species of butterfly

Diaethria astala, the faded eighty-eight or navy eighty-eight, is a species of butterfly of the family Nymphalidae. It is found from Mexico to Colombia.

The larvae feed on Serjania, Paullinia and Cardiospermum species.

== Subspecies ==
- Diaethria astala astala (Mexico)
- Diaethria astala asteria (Mexico)
- Diaethria astala asteroide (Mexico)
