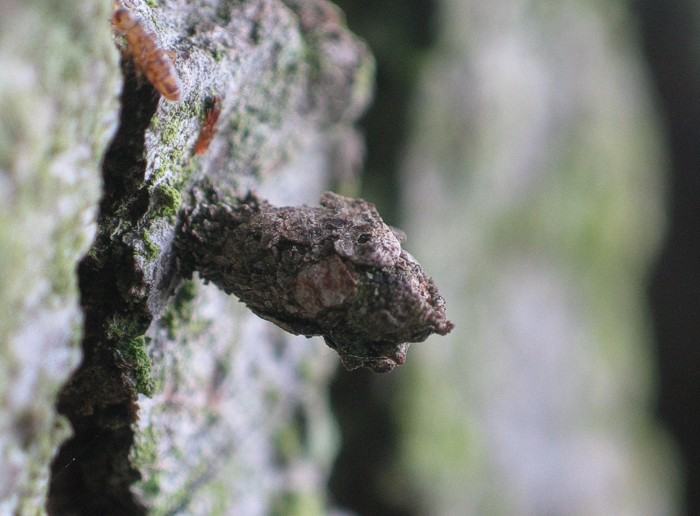
- Bacotia

Scientific classification
- Domain: Eukaryota
- Kingdom: Animalia
- Phylum: Arthropoda
- Class: Insecta
- Order: Lepidoptera
- Family: Psychidae
- Genus: Bacotia; Tutt, 1899

= Bacotia =

Genus of insects

Bacotia is a genus of moths belonging to the family Psychidae.

The species of this genus are found in Europe.

Species:

- Bacotia claustrella (Bruand, 1845)
- Bacotia nepalica Dierl, 1966
