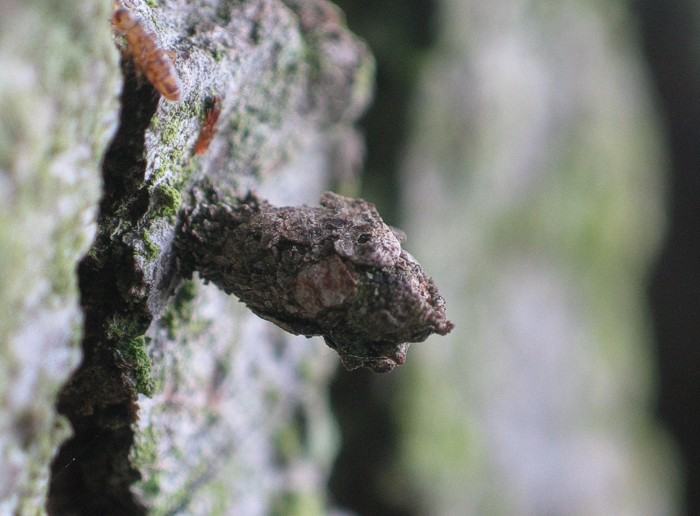

Scientific classification
- Domain: Eukaryota
- Kingdom: Animalia
- Phylum: Arthropoda
- Class: Insecta
- Order: Lepidoptera
- Family: Psychidae
- Genus: Bacotia
- Species: B. claustrella

Binomial name
- Bacotia claustrella (Bruand, 1845)

Synonyms
- Psyche claustrella Bruand, 1845; Psyche sepium Ad. Speyer & Au. Speyer, 1846; Bacotia sepium; Solenobia tabulella Guenée, 1846; Epichnopteryx sepiella Herrich-Schäffer, 1862

= Bacotia claustrella =

Shining smoke

Species of moth

Bacotia claustrella, the shining smoke, is a moth of the Psychidae family. It is found in large parts of Europe, except Ireland, Norway, Finland, the Baltic region, Ukraine, the western and southern part of the Balkan Peninsula and the Iberian Peninsula.

The wingspan is about 13–15 mm for males. Adults are on wing in June and July.

The larvae feed on lichens. Larvae can be found from August to May, overwintering in the larval stage.
