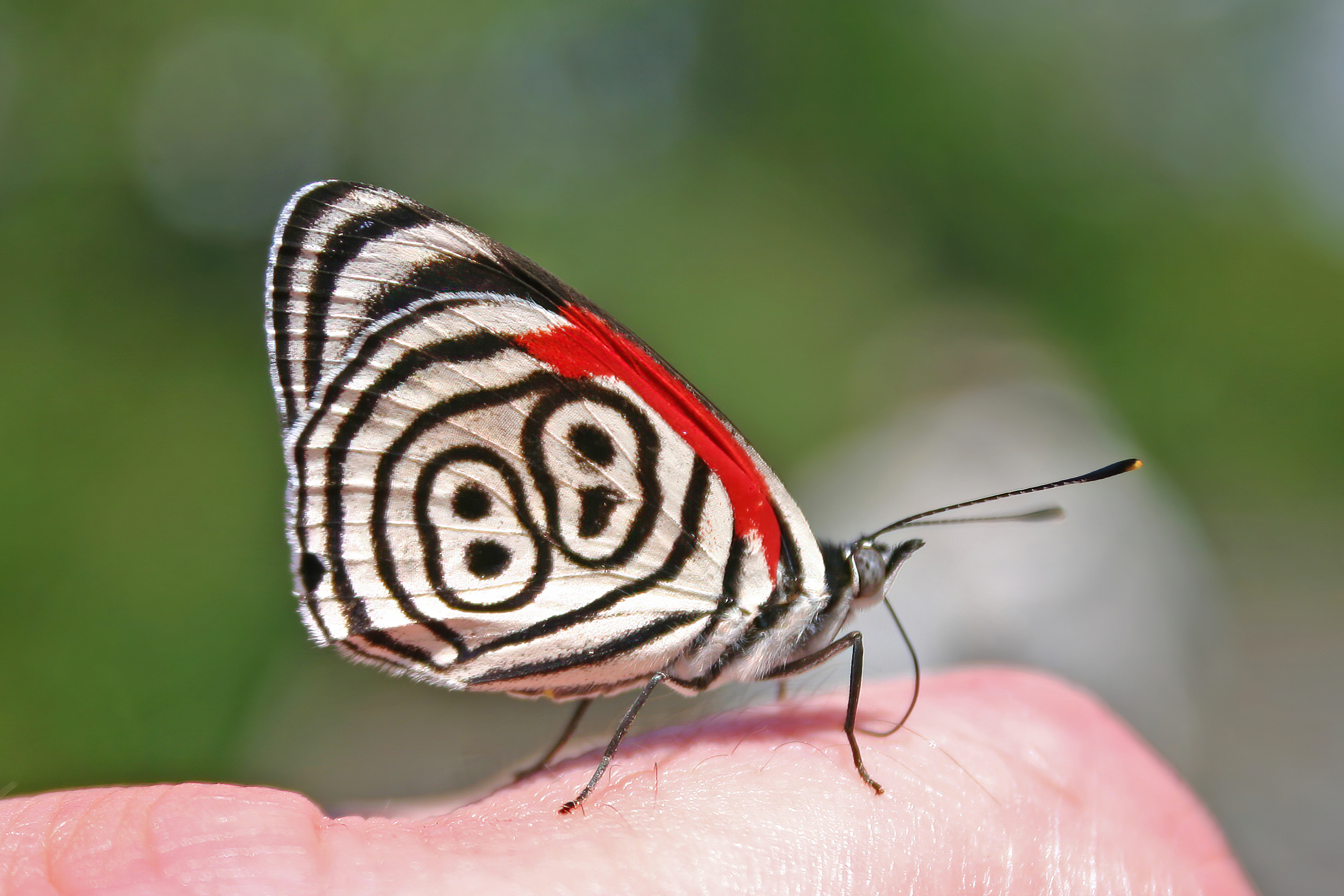
- D. anna
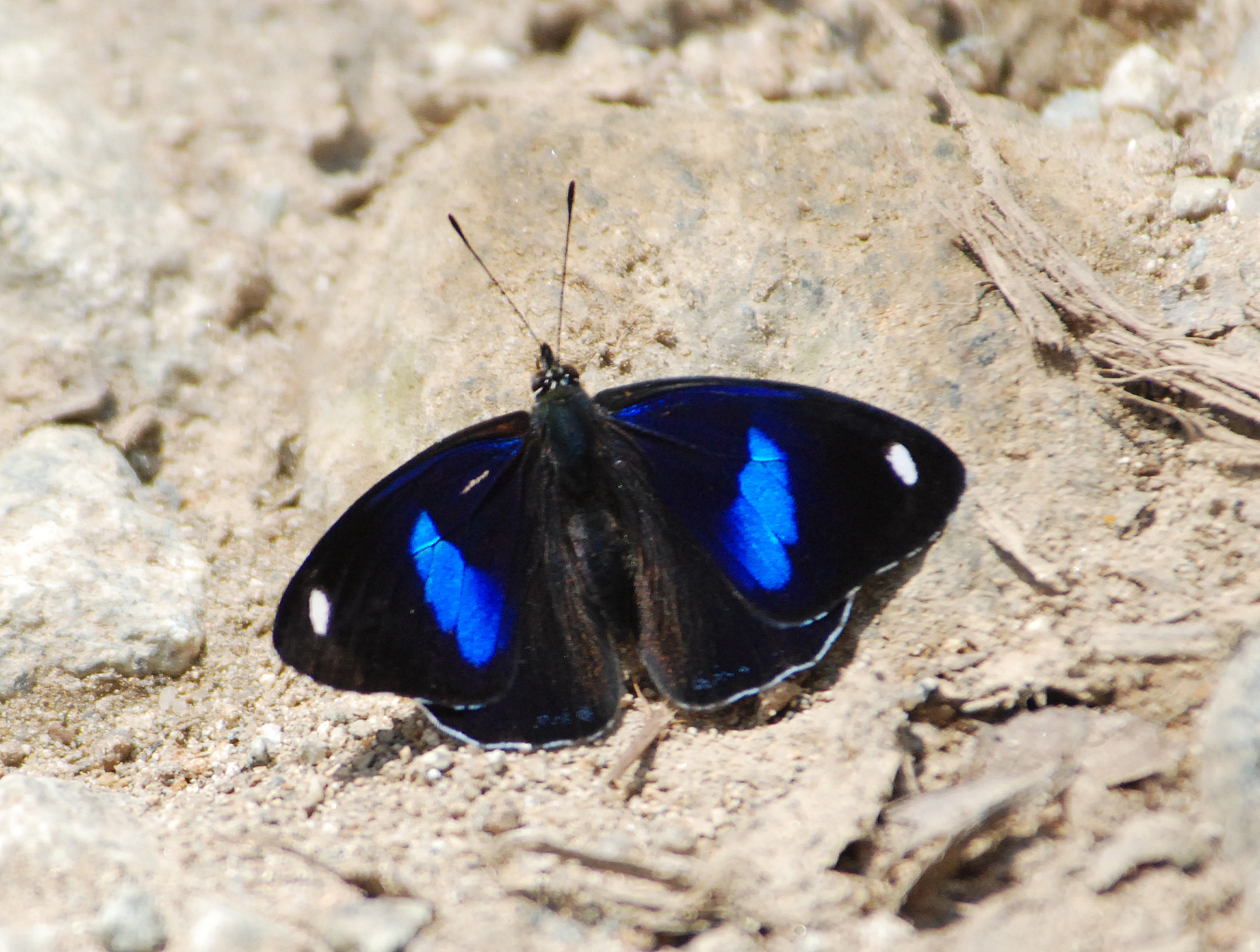
- D. astala

Scientific classification
- Kingdom: Animalia
- Phylum: Arthropoda
- Clade: Pancrustacea
- Class: Insecta
- Order: Lepidoptera
- Family: Nymphalidae
- Tribe: Callicorini
- Genus: Diaethria; Billberg, 1820

Type species
- Diaethria clymena (Cramer, 1775)

Species
- Numerous, see text

Synonyms
- Corecalla Röber, 1915; Cyclogramma Doubleday, [1847]

= Diaethria =

Genus of brush-footed butterflies

Diaethria is a brush-footed butterfly genus found in the Neotropical realm, ranging from Mexico to Paraguay.

Species in this genus are commonly called eighty-eights like the related genera Callicore and Perisama, in reference to the characteristic patterns on the hindwing undersides of many. In Diaethria, the pattern consists of black dots surrounded by concentric white and black lines, and typically looks like the numbers "88" or "89".

== Species ==
Listed alphabetically:

- Diaethria anna (Guérin-Méneville, [1844]) – Anna's eighty-eight
- Diaethria astala (Guérin-Méneville, [1844]) – faded eighty-eight, navy eighty-eight
- Diaethria bacchis (Doubleday, 1849)
- Diaethria candrena (Godart, [1824]) – candrena eighty-eight, number eighty
- Diaethria ceryx (Hewitson, 1864) – Ceryx eighty-eight
- Diaethria clymena (Cramer, 1775) – Cramer's eighty-eight
- Diaethria eluina (Hewitson, 1852) – eluina eighty-eight
- Diaethria euclides (Latreille, [1809])
- Diaethria gabaza (Hewitson, 1852)
- Diaethria neglecta (Salvin, 1869)
- Diaethria nystographa (Guenée, 1872)
- Diaethria pandama (Doubleday, [1848])
