= Narycia obserata =

Scientific classification
- Kingdom: Animalia
- Phylum: Arthropoda
- Class: Insecta
- Order: Lepidoptera
- Family: Psychidae
- Genus: Narycia
- Species: N. obserata

Binomial name
- Narycia obserata Meyrick, 1919

Species of moth

Narycia obserata is a moth of the family Psychidae first described by Edward Meyrick in 1919. It is found in Sri Lanka.
