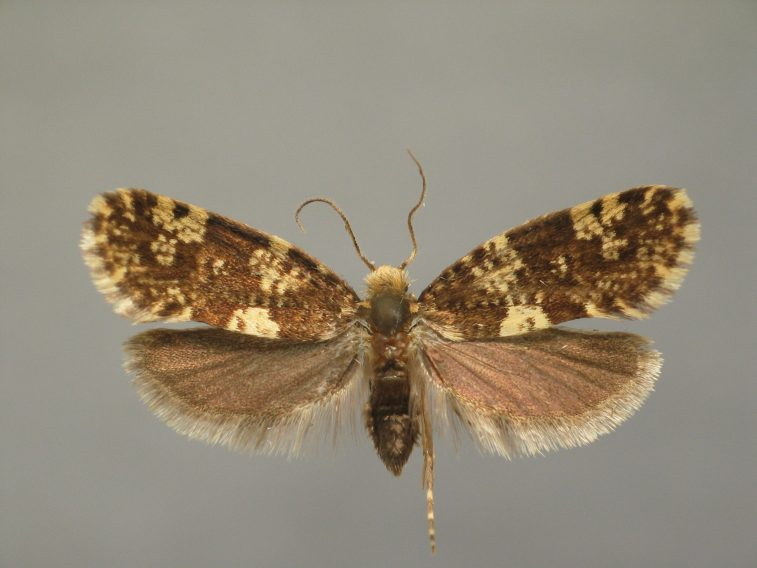

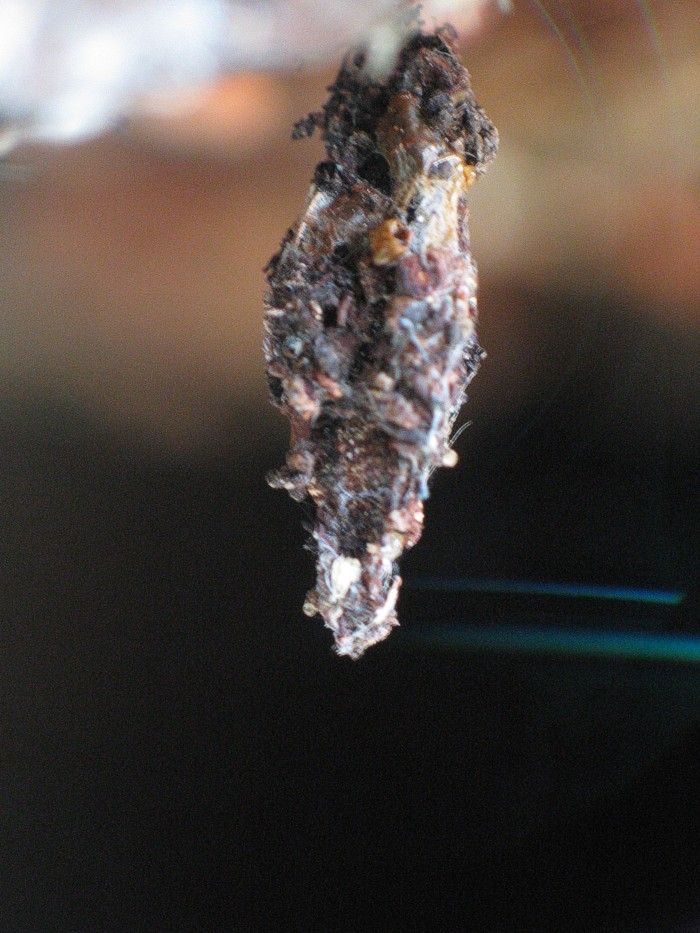

Scientific classification
- Kingdom: Animalia
- Phylum: Arthropoda
- Clade: Pancrustacea
- Class: Insecta
- Order: Lepidoptera
- Family: Psychidae
- Genus: Diplodoma
- Species: D. adspersella

Binomial name
- Diplodoma adspersella Heinemann, 1870

= Diplodoma adspersella =

Species of moth

Diplodoma adspersella is a moth of the Psychidae family. It is found in Germany, Austria, Italy, Hungary and Romania.

The forewings are brownish-grey with a yellow lustre and small pale yellowish spots. The hindwings are light grey.

The larvae feed on mosses, lichens and dead insects.
