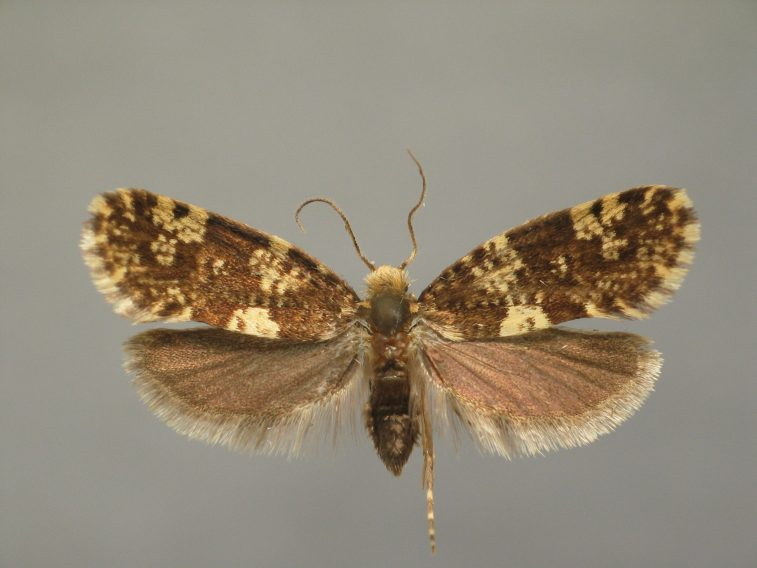
- Diplodoma adspersella

Scientific classification
- Kingdom: Animalia
- Phylum: Arthropoda
- Clade: Pancrustacea
- Class: Insecta
- Order: Lepidoptera
- Family: Psychidae
- Subfamily: Naryciinae
- Tribe: Naryciini
- Genus: Diplodoma; Zeller, 1852

Type species
- Lampronia marginepunctella Stephens, 1835

= Diplodoma =

Genus of moths

Diplodoma is a small genus of the bagworm moth family, Psychidae. Therein, it belongs to the Taleporiinae. Some authors consider Diplodoma a junior synonym of Narycia, but this is not widely accepted.

Species of Diplodoma include:

- Diplodoma adspersella Heinemann, 1870
- Diplodoma laichartingella (Goeze, 1783) (= D. herminatum, D. marginepunctellum)
- Diplodoma taurica Zagulajev, 1986
