= Narycia marmarurga =

Scientific classification
- Kingdom: Animalia
- Phylum: Arthropoda
- Class: Insecta
- Order: Lepidoptera
- Family: Psychidae
- Genus: Narycia
- Species: N. marmarurga

Binomial name
- Narycia marmarurga (Meyrick, 1907)

Synonyms
- Sapheneutis marmarurga Meyrick, 1907

Species of moth

Narycia marmarurga is a moth of the family Psychidae first described by Edward Meyrick in 1907. It is found in India and Sri Lanka.
