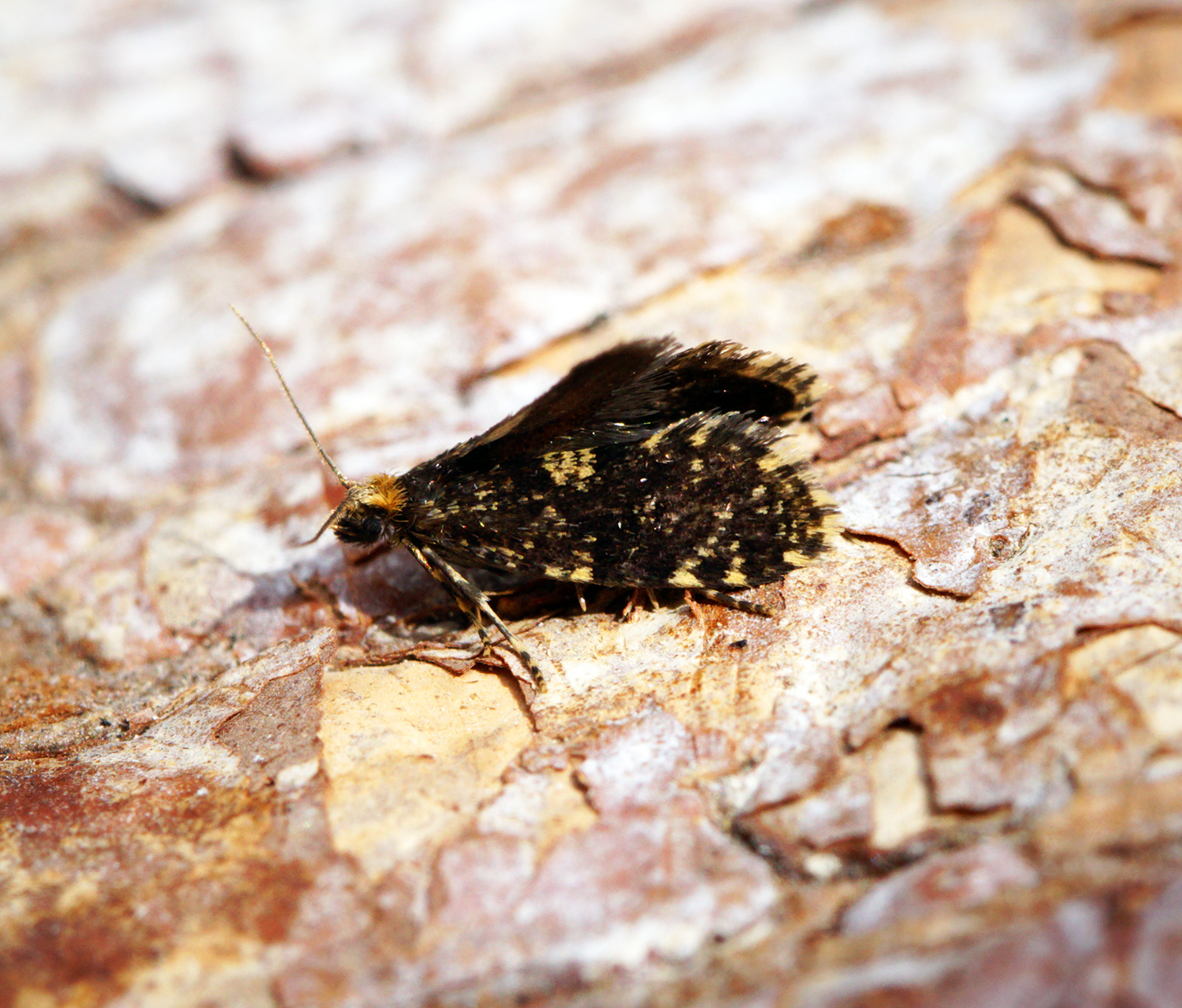
- imago
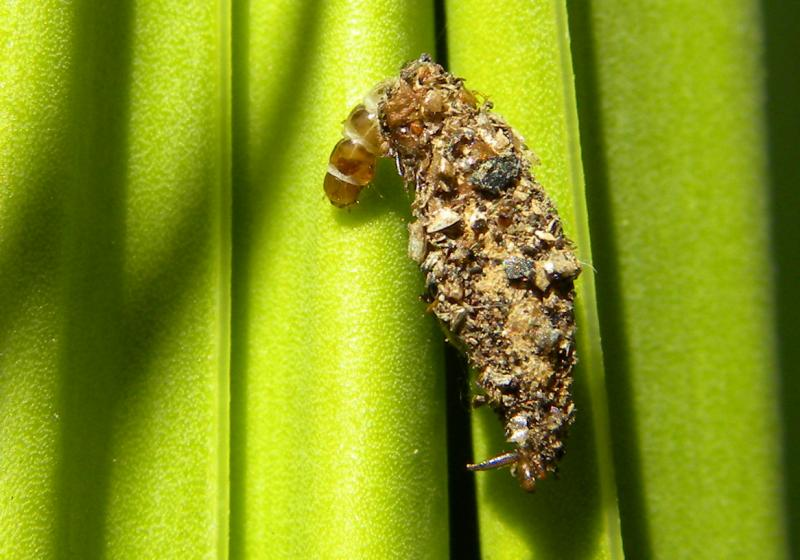
- larva in case

Scientific classification
- Domain: Eukaryota
- Kingdom: Animalia
- Phylum: Arthropoda
- Class: Insecta
- Order: Lepidoptera
- Family: Psychidae
- Genus: Diplodoma
- Species: D. laichartingella

Binomial name
- Diplodoma laichartingella (Goeze, 1783)

Synonyms
- Diplodoma herminatum Fourcroy, 1785; Diplodoma marginepunctellum Stephens, 1835

= Diplodoma laichartingella =

Species of moth

Diplodoma laichartingella is a moth belonging to the genus Diplodoma. The species was first described by Johann August Ephraim Goeze in 1783.

It is native to Europe.

The wingspan of the moth is 11–13 mm. The head is light yellowish ochreous. Forewings dark fuscous, with some scattered whitish-yellowish dots and strigulae; a subquadrate whitish-yellowish dorsal spot before middle. Hindwings dark grey. Larva dull whitish; head pale brown; plate of 2 darker brown; 3 and 4 laterally brownish-tinged: in a three-sided case, enclosed in an outer shorter case, covered with fragments of refuse, on dead insects, fungus, etc.
