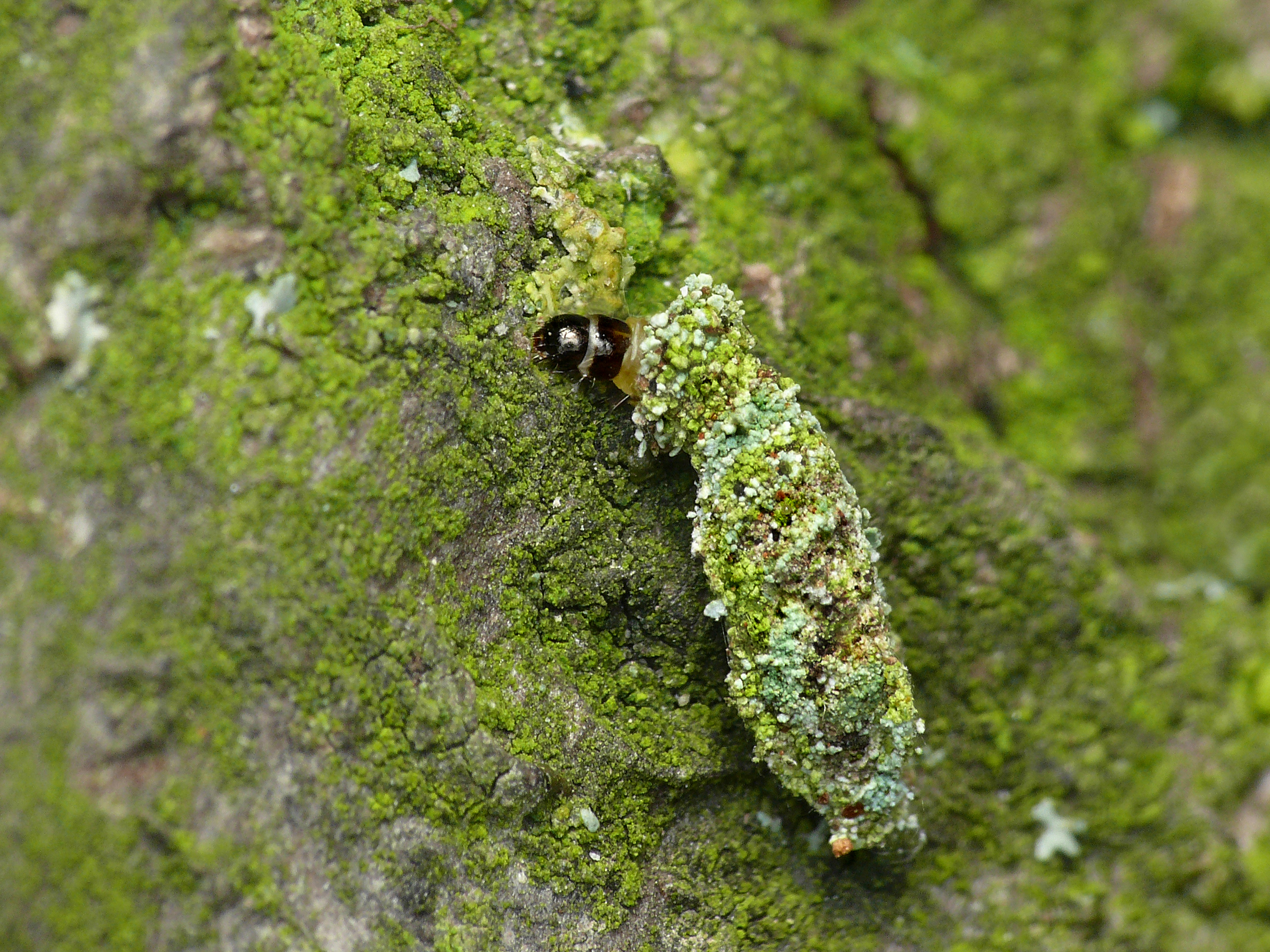
- Larva
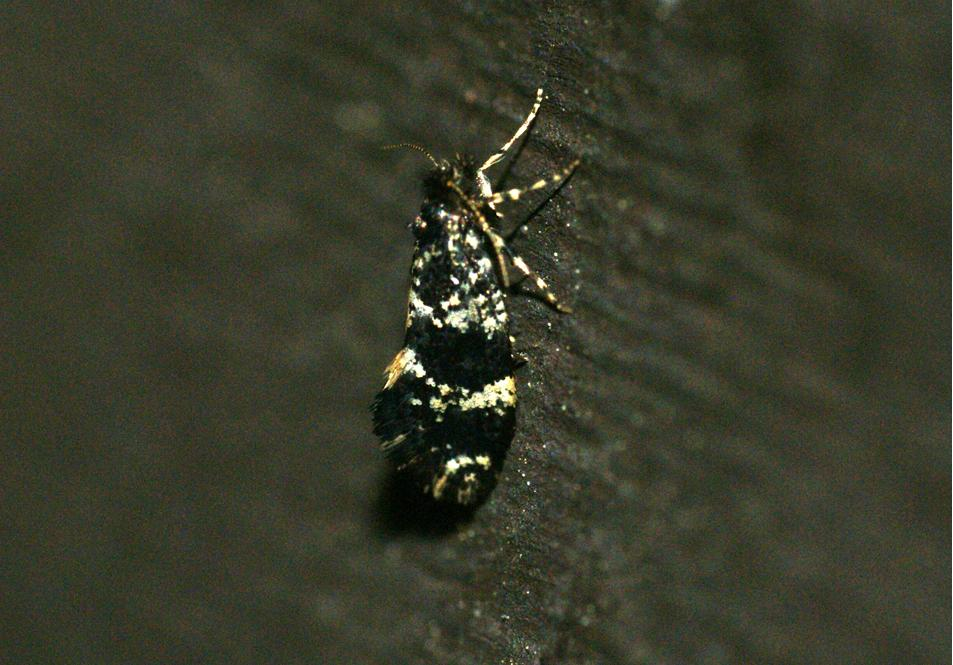
- Imago

Scientific classification
- Domain: Eukaryota
- Kingdom: Animalia
- Phylum: Arthropoda
- Class: Insecta
- Order: Lepidoptera
- Family: Psychidae
- Genus: Narycia
- Species: N. duplicella

Binomial name
- Narycia duplicella (Goeze, 1783)

Synonyms
- Tinea duplicella Goeze, 1783

= Narycia duplicella =

Species of moth

Narycia duplicella is a moth belonging to the family Psychidae and found in Europe. It was described by Johann August Ephraim Goeze in 1783.

== Description ==
A small (wingspan 7–11 millimeters), stout, black and white moth. The female is somewhat more powerful built than the male, with shorter wings and antennae. The antennae are thin and wire-shaped, a little over half as long as the forewings of the male and slightly less than half as long in the female. The base colour of the head, body and forewing is grey-black. The forewing has two narrow, white, slightly irregular transverse bands that are often interrupted in the middle. The hind wings are dark grey. The larva lives in a pear-shaped larval sac that is often green in color from the algae it feeds on.

== Distribution ==
It is native to Europe.
