= Narycia platyzona =

Scientific classification
- Kingdom: Animalia
- Phylum: Arthropoda
- Class: Insecta
- Order: Lepidoptera
- Family: Psychidae
- Genus: Narycia
- Species: N. platyzona

Binomial name
- Narycia platyzona (Meyrick, 1905)

Synonyms
- Melasina platyzona Meyrick, 1905

Species of moth

Narycia platyzona is a moth of the family Psychidae first described by Edward Meyrick in 1905. It is found in Sri Lanka.
