= Narycia =

Scientific classification
- Kingdom: Animalia
- Phylum: Arthropoda
- Clade: Pancrustacea
- Class: Insecta
- Order: Lepidoptera
- Family: Psychidae
- Subfamily: Naryciinae
- Tribe: Naryciini
- Genus: Narycia; Stephens, 1836 (see text)

Type species
- Narycia elegans Stephens, 1836 (see text)

Genus of moths

Narycia is a small genus of the bagworm moth family, Psychidae. Therein, it belongs to the tribe Naryciini, here place in the somewhat disputed subfamily Naryciinae which is sometimes included in the Taleporiinae. Some authors include Diplodoma in Narycia as a junior synonym, but this is not widely accepted.

As indicated by its name, it is the type genus of the Naryciini (and of the Naryciinae if these are valid). The name "Narycia" was initially proposed in 1833 by J.F. Stephens, for a moth he called "N. elegans". But he did not validly describe it at that time, and hence it was not a proper scientific name but a nomen nudum. Stephens corrected his mistake in 1836, redescribing the species and making it the valid type of the new genus.

Species of Narycia include:

- Narycia astrella (Herrich-Schäffer, 1851)
- Narycia duplicella (Goeze, 1783) (= N. elegans, N. monilifera)
- Narycia infernalis Herrmann, 1986
- Narycia marmarurga (Meyrick, 1907)
- Narycia platyzona (Meyrick, 1905)
