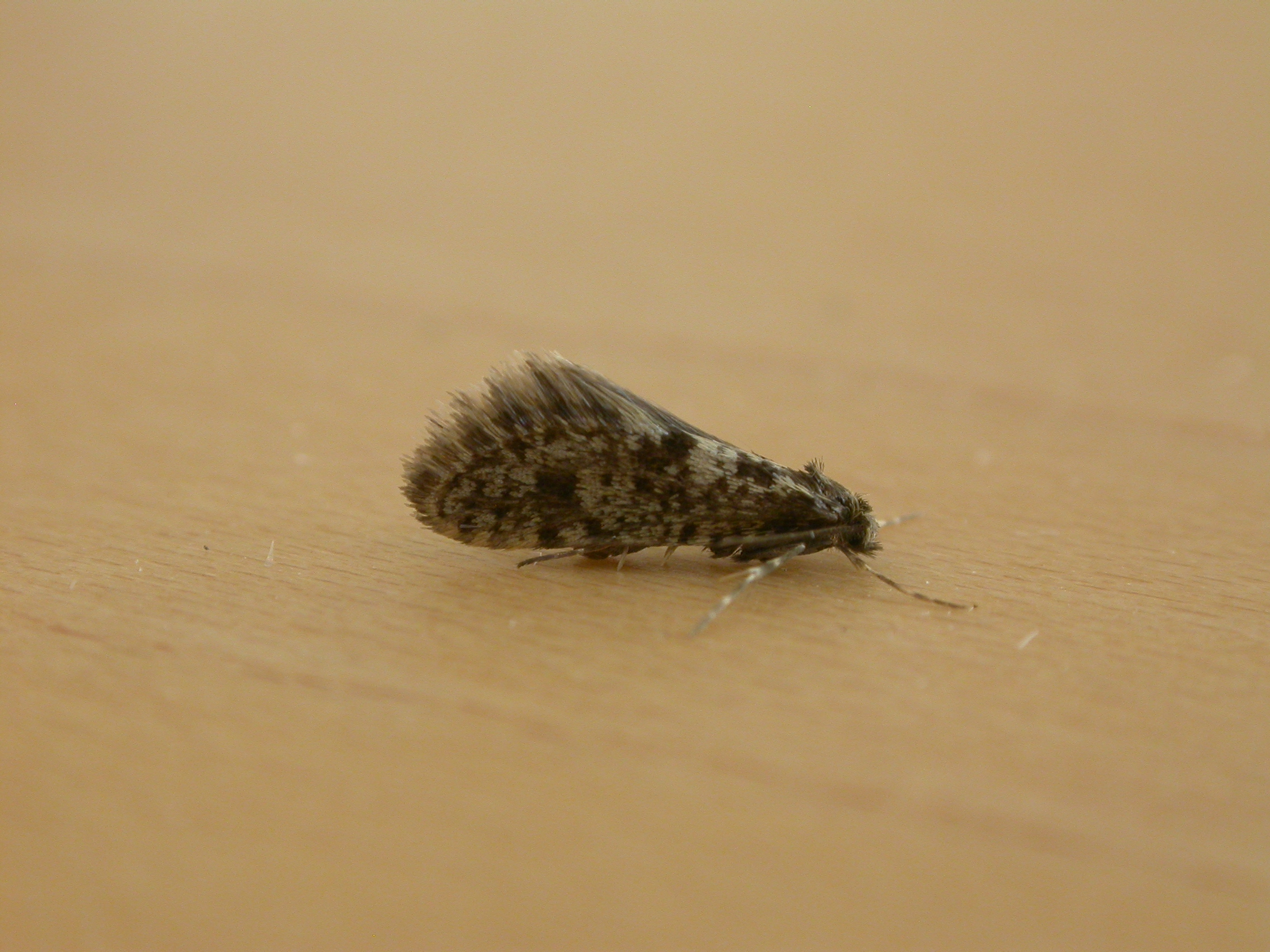
- Bankesia conspurcatella

Scientific classification
- Domain: Eukaryota
- Kingdom: Animalia
- Phylum: Arthropoda
- Class: Insecta
- Order: Lepidoptera
- Family: Psychidae
- Genus: Bankesia; Tutt, 1899

= Bankesia =

Genus of moths

Bankesia is a genus of moths of the Psychidae family.

== Species ==
- Bankesia douglasii (Stainton, 1854)
- Bankesia conspurcatella (Zeller, 1850)
- Bankesia defoliella (Constant, 1895)
- Bankesia deplatsella Nel, 1999
- Bankesia montanella (Walsingham, 1899)
- Bankesia pallida (Staudinger, 1879)
