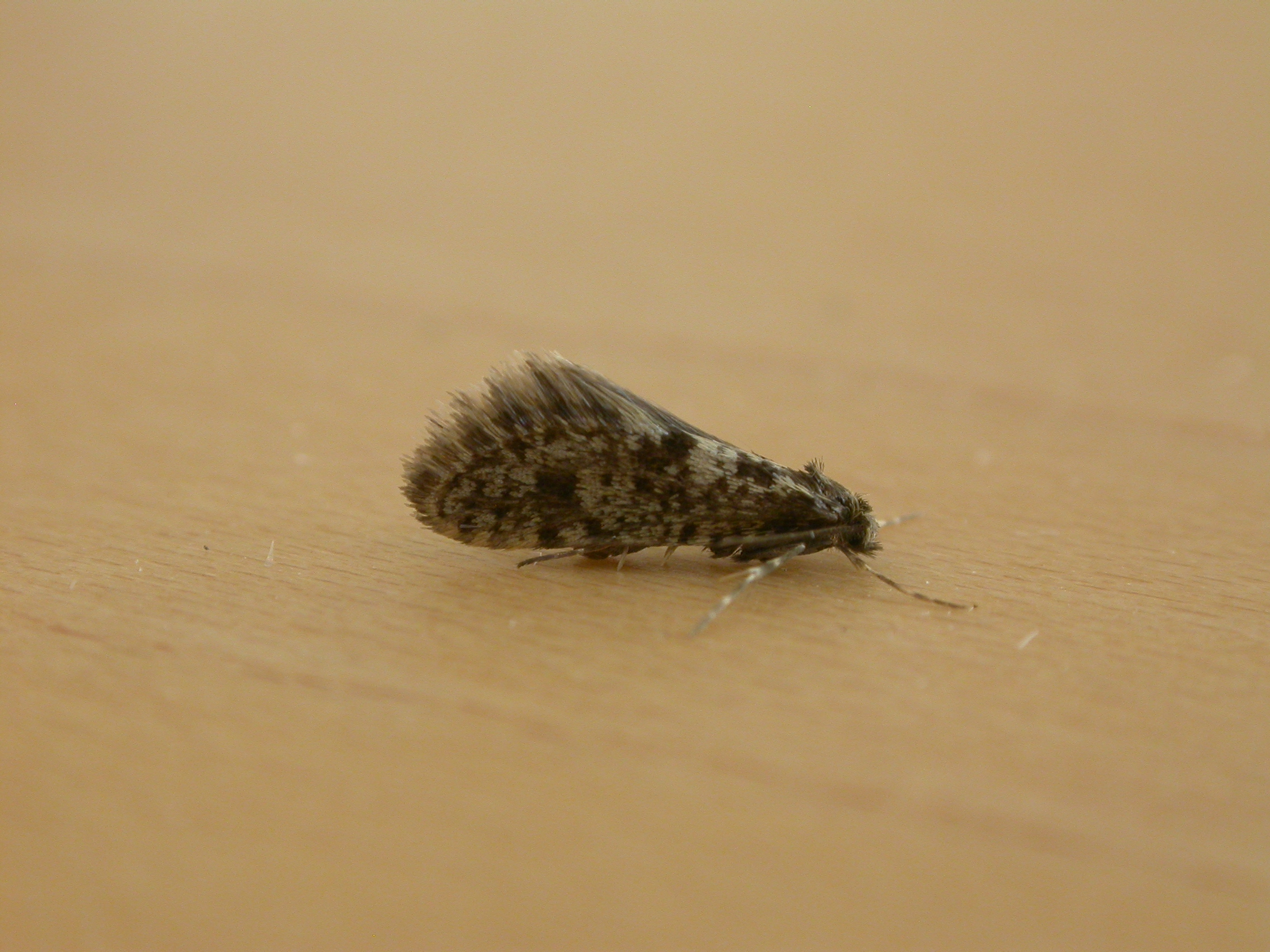

Scientific classification
- Kingdom: Animalia
- Phylum: Arthropoda
- Clade: Pancrustacea
- Class: Insecta
- Order: Lepidoptera
- Family: Psychidae
- Genus: Bankesia
- Species: B. conspurcatella

Binomial name
- Bankesia conspurcatella (Zeller, 1850)

Synonyms
- Talaeporia conspurcatella Zeller, 1850; Bankesia staintoni Walsingham, 1899

= Bankesia conspurcatella =

Species of moth

Bankesia conspurcatella is a species of moth of the family Psychidae. It is found in western Europe.

== Description ==
The wingspan is 11–15 mm. Head light fuscous. Antennal ciliations 3. Forewings whitish -yellowish, with numerous small fuscous spots and strigulae; veins fuscous; indistinct darker dorsal spots towards base and before middle; a darker fuscous discal spot beyond middle. Hindwings light grey. Adults are on wing from January to April in one generation per year.
