= Aquis orbicularis =

Scientific classification
- Kingdom: Animalia
- Phylum: Arthropoda
- Clade: Pancrustacea
- Class: Insecta
- Order: Lepidoptera
- Superfamily: Noctuoidea
- Family: Nolidae
- Genus: Aquis
- Species: A. orbicularis

Binomial name
- Aquis orbicularis (Walker, 1858)

Synonyms
- Diomea orbicularis Walker, 1858; Labanda griseinigra Hampson, 1894

Species of moth

Aquis orbicularis is a moth of the family Nolidae first described by Francis Walker in 1858. It is found in the Indian subregion, Sri Lanka, Peninsular Malaysia, Papua New Guinea and Borneo.

== Description ==
Forewings brownish with falcate apex. There is a curved transverse fascia found in the medial area. Several black dots found on forewings, but absent in hindwings. Male genitalia with triangular uncus and broad valves.
