= Picrogama nigrisparsalis =

Scientific classification
- Kingdom: Animalia
- Phylum: Arthropoda
- Class: Insecta
- Order: Lepidoptera
- Family: Pyralidae
- Genus: Picrogama
- Species: P. nigrisparsalis

Binomial name
- Picrogama nigrisparsalis (Hampson, 1903)

Synonyms
- Thalamorrhyncha nigrisparsalis Hampson, 1903; Lamoria nigrisparsalis Hampson, 1903

Species of moth

Picrogama nigrisparsalis is a moth of the family Pyralidae first described by George Hampson in 1903. It is found in Sri Lanka.
