= Eido autogramma =

Scientific classification
- Kingdom: Animalia
- Phylum: Arthropoda
- Clade: Pancrustacea
- Class: Insecta
- Order: Lepidoptera
- Family: Oecophoridae
- Genus: Eido
- Species: E. autogramma

Binomial name
- Eido autogramma (Meyrick, 1905)

Synonyms
- Elaeonoma autogramma (Meyrick, 1905); Eulechria autogramma Meyrick, 1905

Moth species of genus Eido

Eido autogramma is a moth of the family Oecophoridae first described by Edward Meyrick in 1905. It is found in Sri Lanka.
