= Cryptophycita deflandrella =

Scientific classification
- Kingdom: Animalia
- Phylum: Arthropoda
- Clade: Pancrustacea
- Class: Insecta
- Order: Lepidoptera
- Family: Pyralidae
- Genus: Cryptophycita
- Species: C. deflandrella

Binomial name
- Cryptophycita deflandrella (Ragonot, 1893)

Synonyms
- Cathyalia deflandrella Ragonot, 1893

Species of moth

Cryptophycita deflandrella is a moth of the family Pyralidae first described by Émile Louis Ragonot in 1893. It is found in Sri Lanka.
