= Latiphea berresoides =

Scientific classification
- Kingdom: Animalia
- Phylum: Arthropoda
- Clade: Pancrustacea
- Class: Insecta
- Order: Lepidoptera
- Superfamily: Noctuoidea
- Family: Noctuidae
- Genus: Latiphea
- Species: L. berresoides

Binomial name
- Latiphea berresoides (Hampson, 1893)

Synonyms
- Lobocheilos berresoides Hampson, 1893

Species of moth

Latiphea berresoides is a moth of the family Noctuidae first described by George Hampson in 1893. It is found in India and Sri Lanka.
