= Singhalia sarcoglauca =

Scientific classification
- Kingdom: Animalia
- Phylum: Arthropoda
- Clade: Pancrustacea
- Class: Insecta
- Order: Lepidoptera
- Family: Pyralidae
- Genus: Singhalia
- Species: S. sarcoglauca

Binomial name
- Singhalia sarcoglauca (Hampson, 1896)

Synonyms
- Critonia sarcoglauca Hampson, 1896

Species of moth

Singhalia sarcoglauca is a moth of the family Pyralidae first described by George Hampson in 1896. It is found in Sri Lanka.
