= Guastica semilutea =

Scientific classification
- Kingdom: Animalia
- Phylum: Arthropoda
- Clade: Pancrustacea
- Class: Insecta
- Order: Lepidoptera
- Family: Pyralidae
- Genus: Guastica
- Species: G. semilutea

Binomial name
- Guastica semilutea Walker, 1863

Species of moth

Guastica semilutea is a moth of the family Pyralidae first described by Francis Walker in 1863. It is found in Sri Lanka, Thailand, Malaysia, Sumatra and Borneo.
