= Macrosaces thermopa =

Scientific classification
- Kingdom: Animalia
- Phylum: Arthropoda
- Clade: Pancrustacea
- Class: Insecta
- Order: Lepidoptera
- Family: Oecophoridae
- Genus: Macrosaces
- Species: M. thermopa

Binomial name
- Macrosaces thermopa Meyrick, 1905

Species of moth

Macrosaces thermopa is a moth of the family Oecophoridae first described by Edward Meyrick in 1905. It is found in Sri Lanka.
