= Psaltica monochorda =

Scientific classification
- Kingdom: Animalia
- Phylum: Arthropoda
- Clade: Pancrustacea
- Class: Insecta
- Order: Lepidoptera
- Family: Oecophoridae
- Genus: Psaltica
- Species: P. monochorda

Binomial name
- Psaltica monochorda Meyrick, 1914

Species of moth

Psaltica monochorda is a moth of the family Oecophoridae first described by Edward Meyrick in 1914. It is found in Sri Lanka.
