= Churia maculata =

Scientific classification
- Kingdom: Animalia
- Phylum: Arthropoda
- Clade: Pancrustacea
- Class: Insecta
- Order: Lepidoptera
- Superfamily: Noctuoidea
- Family: Nolidae
- Genus: Churia
- Species: C. maculata

Binomial name
- Churia maculata Moore, 1881

Species of moth

Churia maculata is a moth of the family Nolidae first described by Frederic Moore in 1881. It is found in Sri Lanka.
