= Carea obsolescens =

Scientific classification
- Kingdom: Animalia
- Phylum: Arthropoda
- Class: Insecta
- Order: Lepidoptera
- Superfamily: Noctuoidea
- Family: Nolidae
- Genus: Carea
- Species: C. obsolescens

Binomial name
- Carea obsolescens Moore, 1883

Species of moth

Carea obsolescens is a moth of the family Nolidae first described by Frederic Moore in 1883. It is found in Sri Lanka.
