= Tinerastia fissirella =

Scientific classification
- Kingdom: Animalia
- Phylum: Arthropoda
- Class: Insecta
- Order: Lepidoptera
- Family: Pyralidae
- Genus: Tinerastia
- Species: T. fissirella

Binomial name
- Tinerastia fissirella Hampson, 1896

Species of moth

Tinerastia fissirella is a moth of the family Pyralidae.
