= Lecithocera punctigeneralis =

Scientific classification
- Kingdom: Animalia
- Phylum: Arthropoda
- Class: Insecta
- Order: Lepidoptera
- Family: Lecithoceridae
- Genus: Lecithocera
- Species: L. punctigeneralis

Binomial name
- Lecithocera punctigeneralis (Walker, 1864)

Synonyms
- Tirasia punctigeneralis Walker, 1864

Species of moth in genus Lecithocera

Lecithocera punctigeneralis is a moth in the family Lecithoceridae. It was described by Francis Walker in 1864. It is found on Borneo.

Adults are chalybeous (steel-blue) brown, the wings with a fawn-coloured band and the forewings with two dark cupreous-brown testaceous-bordered bands. The first band is abbreviated in front, dilated hindward, broader than the second, which is marginal. There are also two dark brown testaceous-bordered points on the outer side of the first band. The costa is mostly testaceous, with a dark brown mark in front of the first band.
