= Lecithocera macella =

Scientific classification
- Kingdom: Animalia
- Phylum: Arthropoda
- Class: Insecta
- Order: Lepidoptera
- Family: Lecithoceridae
- Genus: Lecithocera
- Species: L. macella

Binomial name
- Lecithocera macella Meyrick, 1918

Species of moth in the genus Lecithocera

Lecithocera macella is a moth in the family Lecithoceridae. It was described by Edward Meyrick in 1918. It is found in southern India.

The wingspan is about 13 mm. The forewings are pale grey sprinkled with dark fuscous, the costa is more or less suffused with ochreous whitish. The discal stigmata are black, with a suffused dark fuscous dorsal spot beneath the second. There are cloudy blackish marginal dots around the posterior part of the costa and termen. The hindwings are whitish grey.
