= Lecithocera pakiaensis =

Scientific classification
- Kingdom: Animalia
- Phylum: Arthropoda
- Clade: Pancrustacea
- Class: Insecta
- Order: Lepidoptera
- Family: Lecithoceridae
- Genus: Lecithocera
- Species: L. pakiaensis

Binomial name
- Lecithocera pakiaensis Park, 2009

Species of moth in genus Lecithocera

Lecithocera pakiaensis is a moth in the family Lecithoceridae. It was described by Kyu-Tek Park in 2009. It is found in Thailand.

The wingspan is 13.5–15 mm.

== Etymology ==
The species name is derived from the type locality.
