= Lecithocera leucotella =

Scientific classification
- Kingdom: Animalia
- Phylum: Arthropoda
- Clade: Pancrustacea
- Class: Insecta
- Order: Lepidoptera
- Family: Lecithoceridae
- Genus: Lecithocera
- Species: L. leucotella

Binomial name
- Lecithocera leucotella (Walker, 1864)

Synonyms
- Tiriza leucotella Walker, 1864

Species of moth in genus Lecithocera

Lecithocera leucotella is a moth in the family Lecithoceridae. It was described by Francis Walker in 1864. It is found on Borneo.

Adults are dark cupreous, the forewings with three irregular dark metallic-blue bands and with a silvery white point near the tip of the costa. The fringe is silvery white, except towards the interior border. The hindwings have a broad abbreviated irregular semihyaline (almost glasslike) white stripe.
