= Lecithocera loxophthalma =

Scientific classification
- Kingdom: Animalia
- Phylum: Arthropoda
- Class: Insecta
- Order: Lepidoptera
- Family: Lecithoceridae
- Genus: Lecithocera
- Species: L. loxophthalma

Binomial name
- Lecithocera loxophthalma Meyrick, 1934

Species of moth in the genus Lecithocera

Lecithocera loxophthalma is a moth in the family Lecithoceridae. It was described by Edward Meyrick in 1934. It is found in Sudan.
