= Lecithocera umbripennis =

Scientific classification
- Domain: Eukaryota
- Kingdom: Animalia
- Phylum: Arthropoda
- Class: Insecta
- Order: Lepidoptera
- Family: Lecithoceridae
- Genus: Lecithocera
- Species: L. umbripennis

Binomial name
- Lecithocera umbripennis (C. Swinhoe, 1885)

Synonyms
- Gelechia umbripennis C. Swinhoe, 1885

Species of moth in genus Lecithocera

Lecithocera umbripennis is a moth in the family Lecithoceridae. It was described by Charles Swinhoe in 1885. It is found in Mumbai and Pune in India.

The wingspan is about 15 mm for males and 18 mm for females. The forewings are dark umber brown, with two inconspicuous darker spots, the first above and before the middle, the second equidistant from the costal and dorsal margins, at the end of the cell. The hindwings are pale cinereous.
