= Lecithocera cerussata =

Scientific classification
- Kingdom: Animalia
- Phylum: Arthropoda
- Clade: Pancrustacea
- Class: Insecta
- Order: Lepidoptera
- Family: Lecithoceridae
- Genus: Lecithocera
- Species: L. cerussata

Binomial name
- Lecithocera cerussata (Wu, 1994)

Synonyms
- Sarisophora cerussata Wu, 1994

Species of moth in genus Lecithocera

Lecithocera cerussata is a moth in the family Lecithoceridae. It was described by Chun-Sheng Wu in 1994. It is found in China.
