= Lecithocera percnobela =

Scientific classification
- Kingdom: Animalia
- Phylum: Arthropoda
- Class: Insecta
- Order: Lepidoptera
- Family: Lecithoceridae
- Genus: Lecithocera
- Species: L. percnobela

Binomial name
- Lecithocera percnobela (Meyrick, 1911)

Synonyms
- Brachmia percnobela Meyrick, 1911

Species of moth in the genus Lecithocera

Lecithocera percnobela is a moth in the family Lecithoceridae. It was described by Edward Meyrick in 1911. It is found in southern India.

The wingspan is 17–19 mm. The forewings are dark ashy fuscous, the veins obscurely marked with blackish. The stigmata are obscure and blackish, the plical dash like, rather before the first discal, which is also rather elongate. The hindwings are grey.
