= Lecithocera officialis =

Scientific classification
- Kingdom: Animalia
- Phylum: Arthropoda
- Class: Insecta
- Order: Lepidoptera
- Family: Lecithoceridae
- Genus: Lecithocera
- Species: L. officialis

Binomial name
- Lecithocera officialis Meyrick, 1911

Species of moth in the genus Lecithocera

Lecithocera officialis is a moth in the family Lecithoceridae. It was described by Edward Meyrick in 1911. It is found in South Africa.

The wingspan is about 15 mm. The forewings are dark purple fuscous and the hindwings are rather dark grey.
