= Lecithocera paroena =

Scientific classification
- Kingdom: Animalia
- Phylum: Arthropoda
- Class: Insecta
- Order: Lepidoptera
- Family: Lecithoceridae
- Genus: Lecithocera
- Species: L. paroena

Binomial name
- Lecithocera paroena (Meyrick, 1906)

Synonyms
- Macrotoma paroena Meyrick, 1906

Species of moth in the genus Lecithocera

Lecithocera paroena is a moth in the family Lecithoceridae. It was described by Edward Meyrick in 1906. It is found in Sri Lanka.

The wingspan is 23–25 mm. The forewings are light brownish ochreous, somewhat sprinkled with pale brownish and a few black scales. There is a minute black subcostal dot near the base. The discal stigmata are small, cloudy and dark brown, the first resting on a transverse cloudy purple-fuscous mark beneath it, between the first and the second a cloudy fuscous dot in the disc rather above them. There is also a transverse purple-brownish fascia at about three-fourths, somewhat angulated in the middle, faint towards the costa, stronger and much darker on the dorsal half. The hindwings are light fuscous, ochreous tinged.
