= Lecithocera monobyrsa =

Scientific classification
- Domain: Eukaryota
- Kingdom: Animalia
- Phylum: Arthropoda
- Class: Insecta
- Order: Lepidoptera
- Family: Lecithoceridae
- Genus: Lecithocera
- Species: L. monobyrsa

Binomial name
- Lecithocera monobyrsa Meyrick, 1931

Synonyms
- Torodora monobyrsa (Meyrick, 1931)

Species of moth in the genus Lecithocera

Lecithocera monobyrsa is a moth in the family Lecithoceridae. It was described by Edward Meyrick in 1931. It is found in Uganda.

The wingspan is about 18 mm. The forewings are light brownish ochreous and the hindwings are greyish ochreous.
