= Lecithocera anglijuxta =

Scientific classification
- Domain: Eukaryota
- Kingdom: Animalia
- Phylum: Arthropoda
- Class: Insecta
- Order: Lepidoptera
- Family: Lecithoceridae
- Genus: Lecithocera
- Species: L. anglijuxta

Binomial name
- Lecithocera anglijuxta C. Wu, 1997

Species of moth in genus Lecithocera

Lecithocera anglijuxta is a moth in the family Lecithoceridae. It was described by C. Wu in 1997. It is found in Thailand and China (Yunnan).

The wingspan is 17–17.5 mm. The forewings are yellowish-brown.
