= Lecithocera autodyas =

Scientific classification
- Kingdom: Animalia
- Phylum: Arthropoda
- Class: Insecta
- Order: Lepidoptera
- Family: Lecithoceridae
- Genus: Lecithocera
- Species: L. autodyas

Binomial name
- Lecithocera autodyas Meyrick, 1929

Species of moth in the genus Lecithocera

Lecithocera autodyas is a moth in the family Lecithoceridae. It was described by Edward Meyrick in 1929. It is found on New Ireland.

The wingspan is about 14 mm. The forewings are lilac and the hindwings are grey.
