= Lecithocera luteola =

Scientific classification
- Kingdom: Animalia
- Phylum: Arthropoda
- Class: Insecta
- Order: Lepidoptera
- Family: Lecithoceridae
- Genus: Lecithocera
- Species: L. luteola

Binomial name
- Lecithocera luteola Diakonoff, [1968]

Species of moth in genus Lecithocera

Lecithocera luteola is a moth in the family Lecithoceridae. It was described by Alexey Diakonoff in 1968. It is found on Luzon in the Philippines.

The wingspan is about 11 mm. The forewings are light yellowish ochreous, the costa narrowly suffused with brighter ochreous and also narrowly infuscated except before the apex. The base of the wing is indistinctly infuscated and there are traces of fuscous sprinkling over the wing. The veins on the upper half of the wing halfway between the cell and margin are slightly streaked with brownish. The first discal stigma is minute, well beyond one-third and above the middle, the second discal somewhat irregular, transverse, larger and slightly lower than the first, continued by a short outwards-oblique small mark. The apex and termen have a narrow marginal line. The hindwings are glossy, whitish golden, fuscous and paler than the forewings.
