= Lecithocera caustospila =

Scientific classification
- Kingdom: Animalia
- Phylum: Arthropoda
- Class: Insecta
- Order: Lepidoptera
- Family: Lecithoceridae
- Genus: Lecithocera
- Species: L. caustospila

Binomial name
- Lecithocera caustospila Meyrick, 1918

Species of moth in the genus Lecithocera

Lecithocera caustospila is a moth in the family Lecithoceridae. It was described by Edward Meyrick in 1918. It is found in Assam, India.

The wingspan is 14–16 mm. The forewings are ochreous yellowish sprinkled with dark fuscous, with a suffused dark fuscous costal streak from the base to four-fifths, the posterior extremity rather expanded with dark irroration (sprinkles) beneath. The discal stigmata are moderate and blackish and there is an undefined blotch of fuscous suffusion on the dorsum beyond the middle, as well as a suffused fuscous patch extending along the termen. The hindwings are light grey.
