= Lecithocera choleroleuca =

Scientific classification
- Domain: Eukaryota
- Kingdom: Animalia
- Phylum: Arthropoda
- Class: Insecta
- Order: Lepidoptera
- Family: Lecithoceridae
- Genus: Lecithocera
- Species: L. choleroleuca

Binomial name
- Lecithocera choleroleuca Meyrick, 1931

Species of moth in the genus Lecithocera

Lecithocera choleroleuca is a moth in the family Lecithoceridae. It was described by Edward Meyrick in 1931. It is found in Mumbai, India.

The wingspan is about 13 mm. The forewings are ochreous white. The second discal stigma is minute, hardly perceptible and pale greyish ochreous. The hindwings are whitish.
