= Lecithocera integrata =

Scientific classification
- Kingdom: Animalia
- Phylum: Arthropoda
- Class: Insecta
- Order: Lepidoptera
- Family: Lecithoceridae
- Genus: Lecithocera
- Species: L. integrata

Binomial name
- Lecithocera integrata Meyrick, 1918

Species of moth in the genus Lecithocera

Lecithocera integrata is a moth in the family Lecithoceridae. It was described by Edward Meyrick in 1918. It is found in southern India.

The wingspan is about 16 mm. The forewings are rather dark fuscous, with the second discal stigma obscurely darker. The hindwings are pale grey.
