= Lecithocera staurophora =

Scientific classification
- Domain: Eukaryota
- Kingdom: Animalia
- Phylum: Arthropoda
- Class: Insecta
- Order: Lepidoptera
- Family: Lecithoceridae
- Genus: Lecithocera
- Species: L. staurophora

Binomial name
- Lecithocera staurophora Meyrick, 1931

Synonyms
- Lecithocera strepsicrena Meyrick, 1931; Lecithocera spinigera Diakonoff, 1954

Species of moth in the genus Lecithocera

Lecithocera staurophora is a moth in the family Lecithoceridae. It was described by Edward Meyrick in 1931. It is found on New Guinea.
