= Lecithocera lamprodesma =

Scientific classification
- Domain: Eukaryota
- Kingdom: Animalia
- Phylum: Arthropoda
- Class: Insecta
- Order: Lepidoptera
- Family: Lecithoceridae
- Genus: Lecithocera
- Species: L. lamprodesma

Binomial name
- Lecithocera lamprodesma Meyrick, 1922

Species of moth in the genus Lecithocera

Lecithocera lamprodesma is a moth in the family Lecithoceridae. It was described by Edward Meyrick in 1922. It is found on Sulawesi in Indonesia.

The wingspan is about 14 mm. The forewings are lilac grey with a bluish-silvery-metallic streak edged with grey, from the base of the costa beneath the costa to one-third, edged above by a slender ochreous-yellow costal streak from near the base, and beneath by an ochreous-yellow streak marked with a blackish dot near the base, then by another bluish-silvery-metallic streak, and then another ochreous-yellow streak. There is also an irregular blackish fascia at two-fifths, edged with ochreous yellow, reduced on the costa to a small spot separated by ochreous yellow. Beyond this is a median band of pale yellowish scanty strigulation, including a bluish-silvery-metallic longitudinal mark beneath the middle of the costa. There is also a small blackish spot representing the second discal stigma and a trapezoidal dark fuscous blotch occupying the tornal area and reaching halfway across the wing, the costal half above this yellow ochreous including a bluish-silvery-metallic streak beneath the costa. A narrow silvery-metallic terminal fascia is narrowly interrupted above the middle, the upper portion edged anteriorly by a blackish line. The hindwings are rather dark grey.
