= Lecithocera nefasta =

Scientific classification
- Kingdom: Animalia
- Phylum: Arthropoda
- Class: Insecta
- Order: Lepidoptera
- Family: Lecithoceridae
- Genus: Lecithocera
- Species: L. nefasta

Binomial name
- Lecithocera nefasta Meyrick, 1916

Species of moth in the genus Lecithocera

Lecithocera nefasta is a moth in the family Lecithoceridae. It was described by Edward Meyrick in 1916. It is found in southern India.

The wingspan is about 21 mm. The forewings are dark purplish fuscous. The discal stigmata are represented by small obscure darker spots, the first round, the second transverse oval. The hindwings are grey, darker towards the apex.
