= Lecithocera purpurea =

Scientific classification
- Domain: Eukaryota
- Kingdom: Animalia
- Phylum: Arthropoda
- Class: Insecta
- Order: Lepidoptera
- Family: Lecithoceridae
- Genus: Lecithocera
- Species: L. purpurea

Binomial name
- Lecithocera purpurea Diakonoff, 1954

Species of moth in genus Lecithocera

Lecithocera purpurea is a moth in the family Lecithoceridae. It was described by Alexey Diakonoff in 1954. It is found in Papua New Guinea.
