= Lecithocera strangalistis =

Scientific classification
- Kingdom: Animalia
- Phylum: Arthropoda
- Class: Insecta
- Order: Lepidoptera
- Family: Lecithoceridae
- Genus: Lecithocera
- Species: L. strangalistis

Binomial name
- Lecithocera strangalistis (Meyrick, 1911)

Synonyms
- Brachmia strangalistis Meyrick, 1911

Species of moth in the genus Lecithocera

Lecithocera strangalistis is a moth in the family Lecithoceridae. It was described by Edward Meyrick in 1911. It is found in Assam, India.

The wingspan is about 16 mm. The forewings are brownish, sprinkled with dark fuscous. The stigmata are represented by spots of dark fuscous suffusion, the first discal round, the second transverse oval, the plical smaller, beneath the first discal. The posterior half of the costa is suffused with dark fuscous, interrupted by an ochreous-yellowish patch towards the apex, the obscure dark suffusion extending along the upper part of the termen. The hindwings are ochreous whitish grey, becoming grey towards the apex.
