= Lecithocera excaecata =

Scientific classification
- Kingdom: Animalia
- Phylum: Arthropoda
- Clade: Pancrustacea
- Class: Insecta
- Order: Lepidoptera
- Family: Lecithoceridae
- Genus: Lecithocera
- Species: L. excaecata

Binomial name
- Lecithocera excaecata Meyrick, 1922

Species of moth in the genus Lecithocera

Lecithocera excaecata is a moth in the family Lecithoceridae. It was described by Edward Meyrick in 1922. It is found on Java in Indonesia.

The wingspan is about 21 mm. The forewings are brownish, darker towards the base of the costa and with a subtriangular dark fuscous blotch representing the plical and first discal stigmata, connected with the dorsum by rather dark fuscous suffusion. There is a spot of light ochreous-yellowish suffusion on the costa before the middle, beyond this an undefined costal patch of rather dark fuscous suffusion extending to the subterminal line. Two small cloudy dark fuscous spots are transversely placed on the end of the cell and there is a small spot of ochreous-yellowish suffusion on the costa towards the apex, where a curved suffused pale ochreous line runs to the dorsum at four-fifths, preceded on the lower portion by some dark fuscous suffusion. The hindwings are light grey.
