= Lecithocera syntropha =

Scientific classification
- Kingdom: Animalia
- Phylum: Arthropoda
- Class: Insecta
- Order: Lepidoptera
- Family: Lecithoceridae
- Genus: Lecithocera
- Species: L. syntropha

Binomial name
- Lecithocera syntropha Meyrick, 1918

Species of moth in the genus Lecithocera

Lecithocera syntropha is a moth in the family Lecithoceridae. It was described by Edward Meyrick in 1918. It is found in north-western India and Himachal Pradesh.

The wingspan is about 15 mm. The forewings are dark fuscous and the hindwings are light grey.
