= Lecithocera formosana =

Scientific classification
- Domain: Eukaryota
- Kingdom: Animalia
- Phylum: Arthropoda
- Class: Insecta
- Order: Lepidoptera
- Family: Lecithoceridae
- Genus: Lecithocera
- Species: L. formosana

Binomial name
- Lecithocera formosana (Shiraki, 1913)

Synonyms
- Oxygrapha formosana Shiraki, 1913; Acleris formosana

Species of moth in genus Lecithocera

Lecithocera formosana is a moth in the family Lecithoceridae. It was described by Shiraki in 1913. It is found in Taiwan.
