= Lecithocera subservitella =

Scientific classification
- Kingdom: Animalia
- Phylum: Arthropoda
- Class: Insecta
- Order: Lepidoptera
- Family: Lecithoceridae
- Genus: Lecithocera
- Species: L. subservitella

Binomial name
- Lecithocera subservitella (Walker, 1864)

Synonyms
- Gelechia subservitella Walker, 1864

Species of moth in genus Lecithocera

Lecithocera subservitella is a moth in the family Lecithoceridae. It was described by Francis Walker in 1864. It is found on Borneo.

The wingspan is about 17 mm. Adults are pale yellowish, the forewings with two blackish discal dots, one before the middle, the other beyond the middle. The hindwings are cinereous (ash gray).
