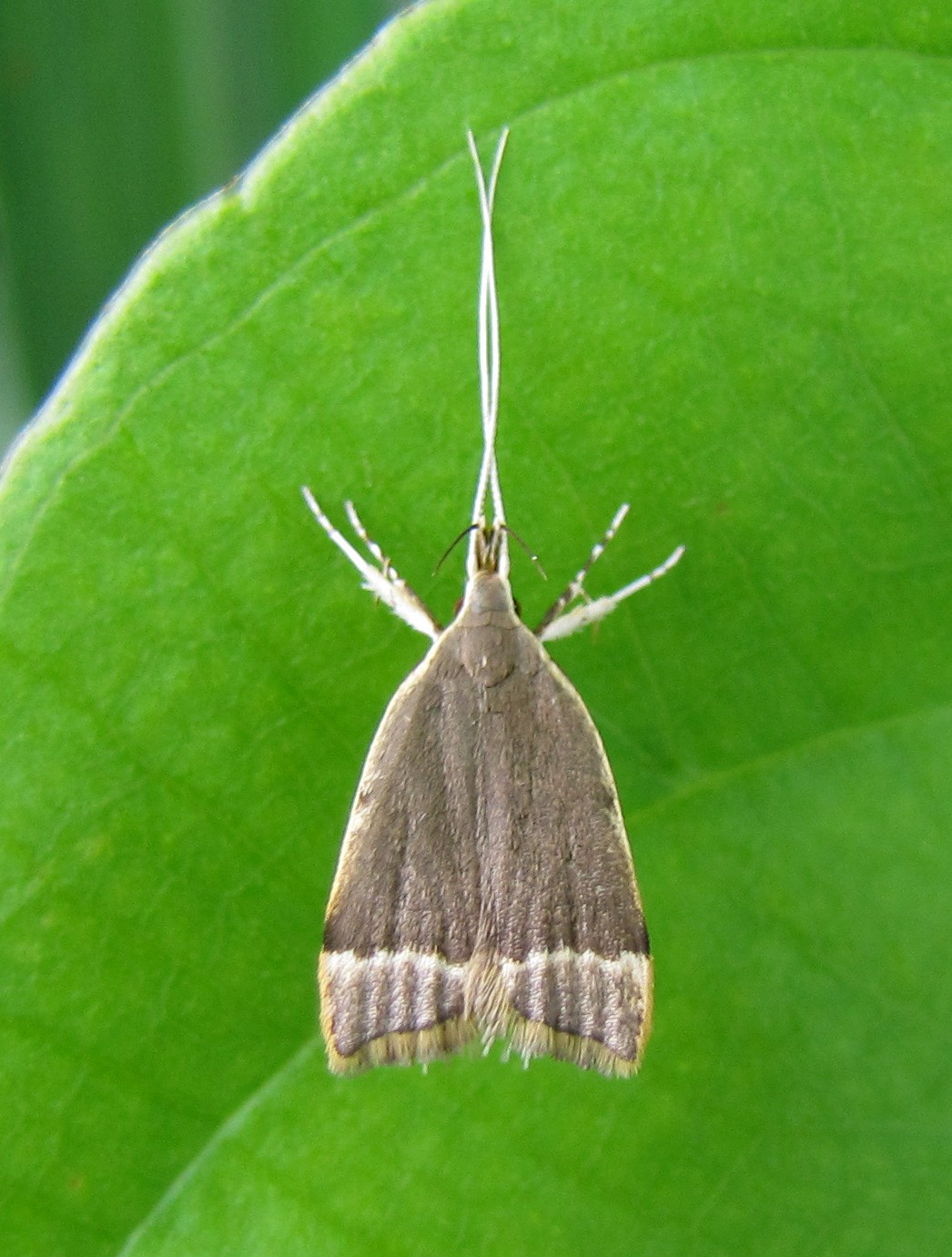
- Lecithocera tenella

Scientific classification
- Kingdom: Animalia
- Phylum: Arthropoda
- Class: Insecta
- Order: Lepidoptera
- Family: Lecithoceridae
- Subfamily: Lecithocerinae
- Genus: Lecithocera; Herrich-Schäffer, 1853

Synonyms
- Andusia Walker, 1866; Brachyerga Meyrick, 1925; Celetodes Meyrick, 1921; Leviptera Janse, 1954; Macrotona Meyrick, 1904; Nyctocyrma Gozmány, 1978; Parrhasastris Gozmány, 1972; Patouissa Walker, 1864; Periphorectis Meyrick, 1925; Psammoris Meyrick, 1906; Quassitagma Gozmány, 1978; Recontracta Gozmány, 1978; Sarisophora Meyrick, 1904 disputed; Siovata Walker, 1866; Syntetarca Gozmány, 1978; Tirasia Walker, 1864; Tiriza Walker, 1864; Titana Walker, 1864; Xanthocera Amsel, 1953; Xanthocerodes Amsel, 1955

= Lecithocera =

Genus of moths in family Lecithoceridae

Lecithocera is a genus of moths in the lecithocerid subfamily Lecithocerinae. The genus was erected by Gottlieb August Wilhelm Herrich-Schäffer in 1853.

== Species ==
- Lecithocera absumptella (Walker, 1864)
- Lecithocera acolasta Meyrick, 1919
- Lecithocera acribostola Diakonoff, [1968]
- Lecithocera acrosphales Meyrick, 1918
- Lecithocera acuta Wadhawan & Walia, 2007
- Lecithocera adelella (Walker, 1864)
- Lecithocera adelella Viette, 1955
- Lecithocera aenicta Janse, 1954
- Lecithocera affusa Meyrick, 1923
- Lecithocera alampes Turner, 1919
- Lecithocera alcestis Meyrick, 1923
- Lecithocera alpestra Park, 2005
- Lecithocera alternella (Walker, 1866)
- Lecithocera altusana Park, 1999
- Lecithocera ambona C. S. Wu & Y. Q. Liu, 1993
- Lecithocera amphigrapta Meyrick, 1926
- Lecithocera amseli Gozmány, 1978
- Lecithocera anatolica Gozmány, 1978
- Lecithocera ancylota (Meyrick, 1894)
- Lecithocera andrianella Viette, 1968
- Lecithocera anglijuxta C. Wu, 1997
- Lecithocera angustiella Park, 1999
- Lecithocera ankasokella Viette, 1968
- Lecithocera anthologella Wallengren, 1875
- Lecithocera antiphractis Meyrick, 1921
- Lecithocera anympha Meyrick, 1916
- Lecithocera asarota Meyrick, 1925
- Lecithocera aspergata Gozmány, 1973
- Lecithocera atricastana Park, 1999
- Lecithocera aulias Meyrick, 1910
- Lecithocera autodyas Meyrick, 1925
- Lecithocera autologa Meyrick, 1910
- Lecithocera baeopis Meyrick, 1929
- Lecithocera barbata Meyrick, 1933
- Lecithocera barbifera Meyrick, 1922
- Lecithocera bariella Viette, 1958
- Lecithocera beijingensis Wu & Liu, 1993
- Lecithocera biaroensis Park, 2012
- Lecithocera bimaculata Park, 1999
- Lecithocera binotata Meyrick, 1918
- Lecithocera bipunctella (Snellen, 1903)
- Lecithocera brachyptila Diakonoff, 1954
- Lecithocera brunneibella Park, 2012
- Lecithocera caecilia Meyrick, 1918
- Lecithocera calochalca Gozmány, 1978
- Lecithocera calomerida Park & Wu, 2010
- Lecithocera cameronella Viette, 1956
- Lecithocera capnaula (Meyrick, 1911)
- Lecithocera carcinopsis Meyrick, 1929
- Lecithocera carpaea (Meyrick, 1906)
- Lecithocera castanoma Wu, 1997
- Lecithocera cataenepha Gozmány, 1973
- Lecithocera caustospila Meyrick, 1918
- Lecithocera caveiformis Meyrick, 1931
- Lecithocera caviella Park, 2005
- Lecithocera ceratoides Park, 2012
- Lecithocera cerussata (Wu, 1994)
- Lecithocera chamela Turner, 1919
- Lecithocera chartaca Wu & Liu, 1993
- Lecithocera chersitis Meyrick, 1918
- Lecithocera chlorogastra Meyrick, 1922
- Lecithocera chloroscia Meyrick, 1938
- Lecithocera choleroleuca Meyrick, 1931
- Lecithocera choritis Meyrick, 1910
- Lecithocera cinnamomea Gozmány, 1978
- Lecithocera coleasta Meyrick, 1918
- Lecithocera combusta Meyrick, 1918
- Lecithocera comparata (Gozmány, 1978)
- Lecithocera compsophila (Meyrick, 1911)
- Lecithocera concinna (Turner, 1919)
- Lecithocera contorta Wu & Liu, 1993
- Lecithocera contracta Meyrick, 1918
- Lecithocera cordata (Meyrick, 1911)
- Lecithocera cornutella (Walker, 1864)
- Lecithocera cornutima Park, 2009
- Lecithocera corythaeola Meyrick, 1931
- Lecithocera cratophanes Meyrick, 1929
- Lecithocera crebrata Meyrick, 1910
- Lecithocera crypsigenes Meyrick, 1929
- Lecithocera cucullata Meyrick, 1914
- Lecithocera cuspidata Wu & Liu, 1993
- Lecithocera cyamitis (Meyrick, 1904)
- Lecithocera daebuensis Park, 1999
- Lecithocera decaryella Viette, 1955
- Lecithocera decorosa Diakonoff, [1968]
- Lecithocera deleastra (Meyrick, 1911)
- Lecithocera deloma Durrant, 1915
- Lecithocera desolata Meyrick, 1918
- Lecithocera dicentropa Meyrick, 1938
- Lecithocera didentata Wu & Liu, 1993
- Lecithocera dierli Gozmány, 1973
- Lecithocera diligens Meyrick, 1922
- Lecithocera diplosticta Meyrick, 1922
- Lecithocera dirupta Meyrick, 1923
- Lecithocera disperma (Diakonoff, 1954)
- Lecithocera dissonella (Walker, 1864)
- Lecithocera distigmatella (Zeller, 1877)
- Lecithocera docilis Diakonoff, [1968]
- Lecithocera dondavisi Park, 2013
- Lecithocera dracopis (Meyrick, 1921)
- Lecithocera dubitans Meyrick, 1926
- Lecithocera duplicata (Gozmány, 1978)
- Lecithocera echinata Gozmány, 1978
- Lecithocera elephantopa (Meyrick, 1910)
- Lecithocera eligmosa C. S. Wu & Y. Q. Liu, 1993
- Lecithocera eludens Meyrick, 1918
- Lecithocera epomia (Meyrick, 1905)
- Lecithocera erebosa Wu & Liu, 1993
- Lecithocera erecta Meyrick, 1935
- Lecithocera eremiodes Park & Wu, 2010
- Lecithocera eretma Wu & Liu, 1993
- Lecithocera eucharis Meyrick, 1933
- Lecithocera eumenopis Meyrick, 1914
- Lecithocera excaecata Meyrick, 1922
- Lecithocera exophthalma (Meyrick, 1911)
- Lecithocera fascicula Park, 1999
- Lecithocera fascinatrix Meyrick, 1935
- Lecithocera fascitiala Park, 2012
- Lecithocera fausta Meyrick, 1910
- Lecithocera flavicosta Gozmány, 1973
- Lecithocera flavifusa Meyrick, 1926
- Lecithocera flavipalpis Walsingham, 1891
- Lecithocera flavofusa Gozmány, 1973
- Lecithocera formosana (Shiraki)
- Lecithocera fornacalis (Meyrick, 1911)
- Lecithocera fraudatrix (Gozmány, 1978)
- Lecithocera frisilina (Gozmány, 1978)
- Lecithocera frustrata Meyrick, 1918
- Lecithocera fuscedinella (Snellen, 1901)
- Lecithocera fuscosa Park, 1999
- Lecithocera gemma Wu & Liu, 1993
- Lecithocera gilviana Park & Wu, 2010
- Lecithocera glabrata (C. S. Wu & Liu, 1992)
- Lecithocera glaphyritis Meyrick, 1918
- Lecithocera goniometra Meyrick, 1929
- Lecithocera gozmanyi Pathania & Rose, 2004
- Lecithocera grammophanes Meyrick, 1926
- Lecithocera graphata Gozmány, 1978
- Lecithocera gyrosiella Park, 2012
- Lecithocera haemylopis (Meyrick, 1911)
- Lecithocera hemiacma Meyrick, 1910
- Lecithocera hiarakella Viette, 1988
- Lecithocera hiata Wu & Liu, 1993
- Lecithocera hildebrandtella Viette, 1956
- Lecithocera hispidiella Park, 2012
- Lecithocera homocentra Meyrick, 1910
- Lecithocera hypsipola Meyrick, 1926
- Lecithocera ianthodes Meyrick, 1931
- Lecithocera ichorodes Meyrick, 1910
- Lecithocera ideologa Meyrick, 1937
- Lecithocera immobilis Meyrick, 1918
- Lecithocera improvisa Diakonoff, [1968]
- Lecithocera imprudens (Meyrick, 1914)
- Lecithocera indigens (Meyrick, 1914)
- Lecithocera inepta Meyrick, 1926
- Lecithocera inkyuleei Park, 2012
- Lecithocera innotatella (Walker, 1864)
- Lecithocera insidians Meyrick, 1918
- Lecithocera integrata Meyrick, 1918
- Lecithocera iodocarpha Gozmány, 1978
- Lecithocera iresia (Meyrick, 1911)
- Lecithocera isomitra Meyrick, 1914
- Lecithocera isophanes (Turner, 1919)
- Lecithocera itrinea Meyrick, 1910
- Lecithocera jugalis Meyrick, 1918
- Lecithocera kambanella Viette, 1986
- Lecithocera lacunara Wu & Liu, 1993
- Lecithocera ladrone Gozmány, 2002
- Lecithocera laminospina (Wu & Park, 1999)
- Lecithocera lamprodesma Meyrick, 1922
- Lecithocera lasioides Park, 2012
- Lecithocera latiola Park, 1999
- Lecithocera lecithocerella Viette, 1956
- Lecithocera leucoceros Meyrick, 1932
- Lecithocera leucomastis Diakonoff, [1968]
- Lecithocera leucotella (Walker, 1864)
- Lecithocera levirota Wu & Liu, 1993
- Lecithocera licnitha Wu & Liu, 1993
- Lecithocera linocoma Meyrick, 1916
- Lecithocera longivalva Gozmány, 1978
- Lecithocera loxophthalma Meyrick, 1934
- Lecithocera lucernata Meyrick, 1913
- Lecithocera luteola Diakonoff, [1968]
- Lecithocera luticostella Turati, 1926
- Lecithocera macella Meyrick, 1918
- Lecithocera macrotoma Meyrick, 1918
- Lecithocera magna Park, 2005
- Lecithocera malacta Meyrick, 1918
- Lecithocera masoalella Viette, 1955
- Lecithocera mazina Meyrick, 1910
- Lecithocera megalopis Meyrick, 1916
- Lecithocera megalosperma Diakonoff, 1954
- Lecithocera melliflua Gozmány, 1978
- Lecithocera meloda Wu & Liu, 1993
- Lecithocera mepsina Park, 2006
- Lecithocera mesosura C. S. Wu & Park, 1999
- Lecithocera metacausta Meyrick, 1910
- Lecithocera metopaena C. S. Wu & Park, 1999
- Lecithocera micromela (Lower, 1897)
- Lecithocera mocquerysella Viette, 1955
- Lecithocera monobyrsa Meyrick, 1931
- Lecithocera montana Park, 2005
- Lecithocera montiatilis Park, 2009
- Lecithocera mylitacha Wu & Liu, 1993
- Lecithocera myopa Meyrick, 1913
- Lecithocera nefasta Meyrick, 1916
- Lecithocera neosticta Meyrick, 1918
- Lecithocera nepalica Gozmány, 1973
- Lecithocera nepheloschema Gozmány, 1973
- Lecithocera nigrana (Duponchel, 1835)
- Lecithocera niptanensis Park, 2012
- Lecithocera nitikoba Wu & Liu, 1993
- Lecithocera nomaditis Meyrick, 1916
- Lecithocera noseropa (Turner, 1919)
- Lecithocera obsignata Meyrick, 1914
- Lecithocera ochrometra Meyrick, 1933
- Lecithocera octonias Meyrick, 1910
- Lecithocera officialis Meyrick, 1911
- Lecithocera ojejyella Viette, 1986
- Lecithocera olinxana Wu & Liu, 1993
- Lecithocera omphacias Meyrick, 1910
- Lecithocera orbiculata Park & Wu, 2010
- Lecithocera oxycona Meyrick, 1910
- Lecithocera pachyntis Meyrick, 1894
- Lecithocera pakiaensis Park, 2009
- Lecithocera palingensis Park, 1999
- Lecithocera palmata Wu & Liu, 1993
- Lecithocera palpella Bradley, 1961
- Lecithocera paralevirota Park, 1999
- Lecithocera parenthesis Gozmány, 1973
- Lecithocera paroena (Meyrick, 1906)
- Lecithocera paulianella Viette, 1955
- Lecithocera pauperella Rebel, 1917
- Lecithocera peloceros Meyrick, 1938
- Lecithocera pelomorpha Meyrick, 1931
- Lecithocera pepantica Meyrick, 1934
- Lecithocera peracantha Gozmány, 1978
- Lecithocera percnobela (Meyrick, 1911)
- Lecithocera perfida Meyrick, 1918
- Lecithocera perigypsa Meyrick, 1922
- Lecithocera perpensa Meyrick, 1918
- Lecithocera perrierella Viette, 1985
- Lecithocera persica Gozmány, 1978
- Lecithocera petalana C. S. Wu & Y. Q. Liu, 1993
- Lecithocera phaeodryas Meyrick, 1931
- Lecithocera phaeoperla Gozmány, 1978
- Lecithocera phratriastis Meyrick, 1929
- Lecithocera plicata C. S. Wu & Park, 1999
- Lecithocera poculata Park & Wu, 2010
- Lecithocera pogonikuma C. S. Wu & Park, 1999
- Lecithocera poliocoma Meyrick, 1916
- Lecithocera polioflava Gozmány, 1978
- Lecithocera porrectiella Park, 2012
- Lecithocera praeses Meyrick, 1919
- Lecithocera proclivis Meyrick, 1910
- Lecithocera protolyca Meyrick, 1938
- Lecithocera protoma Meyrick, 1914
- Lecithocera prudens Meyrick, 1918
- Lecithocera pseudolunata Park, 2012
- Lecithocera ptochas Meyrick, 1918
- Lecithocera pulchella Park, 1999
- Lecithocera pulcherrimella (Walker, 1866)
- Lecithocera punctigeneralis (Walker, 1864)
- Lecithocera purpurea Diakonoff, 1954
- Lecithocera puteolata (Meyrick, 1911)
- Lecithocera pyxinodes Meyrick, 1918
- Lecithocera querula Meyrick, 1910
- Lecithocera rabenoroi Viette, 1988
- Lecithocera radamella Viette, 1968
- Lecithocera ranavaloella Viette, 1967
- Lecithocera randimella Viette, 1956
- Lecithocera raphidica Gozmány, 1978
- Lecithocera responsa Meyrick, 1918
- Lecithocera rotundata Gozmány, 1978
- Lecithocera rubigona Park, 2006
- Lecithocera sabrata Wu & Liu, 1993
- Lecithocera sceptrarcha Meyrick, 1920
- Lecithocera schoutedeniella Ghesquière, 1940
- Lecithocera semirupta Meyrick, 1910
- Lecithocera semnodora Meyrick, 1933
- Lecithocera serena Gozmány, 1978
- Lecithocera sextacta Diakonoff, 1954
- Lecithocera shanpinensis Park, 1999
- Lecithocera sigillata (Gozmány, 1978)
- Lecithocera signifera (Felder & Rogenhofer, 1875)
- Lecithocera sikkimella (Caradja, 1920)
- Lecithocera similis Park, 2006
- Lecithocera simulatrix (Gozmány, 1978)
- Lecithocera sinuosa Meyrick, 1910
- Lecithocera sobria (Meyrick, 1904)
- Lecithocera sophronopa Diakonoff, [1968]
- Lecithocera spinulata Park, 2012
- Lecithocera squalida Gozmány, 1978
- Lecithocera squamifera Meyrick, 1929
- Lecithocera staurophora Meyrick, 1931
- Lecithocera stelophanes Meyrick, 1938
- Lecithocera stichoides Park, 2012
- Lecithocera stomobapta Meyrick, 1929
- Lecithocera storestis (Meyrick, 1911)
- Lecithocera strangalistis (Meyrick, 1911)
- Lecithocera strenua Diakonoff, [1968]
- Lecithocera strigosa Durrant, 1915
- Lecithocera structurata Gozmány, 1978
- Lecithocera sublunata Diakonoff, 1954
- Lecithocera submersa Diakonoff, 1954
- Lecithocera subservitella (Walker, 1864)
- Lecithocera symptomatica Meyrick, 1931
- Lecithocera syntropha Meyrick, 1918
- Lecithocera syriella Gozmány, 1978
- Lecithocera telosperma Diakonoff, [1968]
- Lecithocera tenella (Turner, 1919)
- Lecithocera terrena (Turner, 1919)
- Lecithocera terrigena (Meyrick, 1904)
- Lecithocera thaiheisana Park, 1999
- Lecithocera theconoma Meyrick, 1926
- Lecithocera thioclora Meyrick, 1931
- Lecithocera tienchiensis Park, 1999
- Lecithocera timioceros Meyrick, 1938
- Lecithocera tricholoba Gozmány, 1978
- Lecithocera tridentata Wu & Liu, 1993
- Lecithocera trifera Meyrick, 1938
- Lecithocera trigonopsis (Meyrick, 1907)
- Lecithocera tumidosa Park & Wu, 2010
- Lecithocera turcica Gozmány & Mey, 2005
- Lecithocera tylobathra Meyrick, 1931
- Lecithocera umbripennis (Swinhoe, 1885)
- Lecithocera vartiani Gozmány, 1978
- Lecithocera xanthoantennalis Wadhawan & Walia, 2007
- Lecithocera xanthochalca Meyrick, 1914
- Lecithocera xanthocosma (Meyrick, 1923)
- Lecithocera xanthocostalis Wadhawan & Walia, 2007
- Lecithocera xanthophaea Meyrick, 1926
- Lecithocera yoshiyasui Park, 2006

== Former species ==
- Lecithocera brachymita (Turner, 1919)
- Lecithocera chlaenota (Meyrick, 1904)
- Lecithocera cyclonitis (Meyrick, 1904)
- Lecithocera dispila (Turner, 1919)
- Lecithocera epigompha Meyrick, 1910
- Lecithocera geraea (Meyrick, 1911)
- Lecithocera leptoglypta (Meyrick, 1904)
- Lecithocera leucoscia (Turner, 1919)
- Lecithocera lycopis (Meyrick, 1911)
- Lecithocera marginata Walsingham, 1891
- Lecithocera meyricki (Ghesquière, 1940)
- Lecithocera nubigena (Meyrick, 1911)
- Lecithocera nyctiphylax (Turner, 1919)
- Lecithocera paraulias Gozmány, 1978
- Lecithocera paroristis (Meyrick, 1911)
- Lecithocera pycnospila (Turner, 1919)
- Lecithocera xylogramma Meyrick, 1922
