= Lecithocera erecta =

Scientific classification
- Kingdom: Animalia
- Phylum: Arthropoda
- Clade: Pancrustacea
- Class: Insecta
- Order: Lepidoptera
- Family: Lecithoceridae
- Genus: Lecithocera
- Species: L. erecta

Binomial name
- Lecithocera erecta Meyrick, 1935

Species of moth in genus Lecithocera

Lecithocera erecta is a moth in the family Lecithoceridae. It is found in the provinces of Zhejiang, Anhui, Jiangxi, Hunan, Fujian, Sichuan and Yunnan in China and in Taiwan.

The wingspan is 13–14 mm (0.51–0.55 in).
