= Lecithocera theconoma =

Scientific classification
- Kingdom: Animalia
- Phylum: Arthropoda
- Class: Insecta
- Order: Lepidoptera
- Family: Lecithoceridae
- Genus: Lecithocera
- Species: L. theconoma

Binomial name
- Lecithocera theconoma Meyrick, 1926

Species of moth in genus Lecithocera

Lecithocera theconoma is a moth in the family Lecithoceridae. It is found in Taiwan.
