= Lecithocera ichorodes =

Scientific classification
- Kingdom: Animalia
- Phylum: Arthropoda
- Class: Insecta
- Order: Lepidoptera
- Family: Lecithoceridae
- Genus: Lecithocera
- Species: L. ichorodes

Binomial name
- Lecithocera ichorodes Meyrick, 1910

Species of moth in the genus Lecithocera

Lecithocera ichorodes is a moth in the family Lecithoceridae. It was described by Edward Meyrick in 1910. It is found in southern India.

The wingspan is about 15 mm. The forewings are fuscous mixed with dark fuscous. All veins are indicated by cloudy whitish-fuscous streaks and the costal edge is whitish fuscous except towards the base. The discal stigmata are cloudy and dark fuscous. The hindwings are pale grey, darker towards the apex.
