= Lecithocera ptochas =

Scientific classification
- Kingdom: Animalia
- Phylum: Arthropoda
- Class: Insecta
- Order: Lepidoptera
- Family: Lecithoceridae
- Genus: Lecithocera
- Species: L. ptochas

Binomial name
- Lecithocera ptochas Meyrick, 1918

Species of moth in the genus Lecithocera

Lecithocera ptochas is a moth in the family Lecithoceridae. It was described by Edward Meyrick in 1918. It is found in Bengal.

The wingspan is about 10 mm. The forewings are dark grey with the second discal stigma indistinct and dark fuscous. There is an indistinct whitish dot on the costa at three-fourths. The hindwings are grey.
