= Lecithocera distigmatella =

Scientific classification
- Kingdom: Animalia
- Phylum: Arthropoda
- Clade: Pancrustacea
- Class: Insecta
- Order: Lepidoptera
- Family: Lecithoceridae
- Genus: Lecithocera
- Species: L. distigmatella

Binomial name
- Lecithocera distigmatella (Zeller, 1877)

Synonyms
- Gelechia (Ceratophora) distigmatella Zeller, 1877

Species of moth in genus Lecithocera

Lecithocera distigmatella is a moth in the family Lecithoceridae. It was described by Philipp Christoph Zeller in 1877. It is found in Australia.
