= Lecithocera xanthophaea =

Scientific classification
- Domain: Eukaryota
- Kingdom: Animalia
- Phylum: Arthropoda
- Class: Insecta
- Order: Lepidoptera
- Family: Lecithoceridae
- Genus: Lecithocera
- Species: L. xanthophaea

Binomial name
- Lecithocera xanthophaea Meyrick, 1926

Species of moth in genus Lecithocera

Lecithocera xanthophaea is a moth in the family Lecithoceridae. It was described by Edward Meyrick in 1926. It is found on Borneo.

The wingspan is about 18 mm. The forewings are brownish irregularly sprinkled dark fuscous and with a rather broad streak of yellow-ochreous suffusion from the base beneath the costa to the costa near the apex, the costal edge above it suffused dark fuscous, more strongly towards the base. In males, there is a rather broad yellow-ochreous subdorsal streak from near the base to near the termen. The first discal stigma is moderate and dark fuscous, the second forming a narrow transverse dark fuscous bar extended to the costa and dorsum by undefined dark fuscous suffusion. There is also a dark fuscous terminal line preceded by fuscous suffusion. The hindwings are grey in males and dark grey in females.
