= Lecithocera xanthochalca =

Scientific classification
- Domain: Eukaryota
- Kingdom: Animalia
- Phylum: Arthropoda
- Class: Insecta
- Order: Lepidoptera
- Family: Lecithoceridae
- Genus: Lecithocera
- Species: L. xanthochalca

Binomial name
- Lecithocera xanthochalca Meyrick, 1914

Species of moth in genus Lecithocera

Lecithocera xanthochalca is a moth in the family Lecithoceridae. It was described by Edward Meyrick in 1914. It is found in Malawi and the Democratic Republic of Congo (West Kasai, Katanga).

The wingspan is about 16 mm. The forewings are shining purplish-bronze and the hindwings are dark grey.
