= Lecithocera crebrata =

Scientific classification
- Kingdom: Animalia
- Phylum: Arthropoda
- Class: Insecta
- Order: Lepidoptera
- Family: Lecithoceridae
- Genus: Lecithocera
- Species: L. crebrata

Binomial name
- Lecithocera crebrata Meyrick, 1910

Species of moth in the genus Lecithocera

Lecithocera crebrata is a moth in the family Lecithoceridae. It was described by Edward Meyrick in 1910. It is found in southern India.

The wingspan is about 18 mm. The forewings are pale ochreous yellowish, in males irregularly irrorated (sprinkled) with fuscous and blackish, in females almost concealed with dense purple-blackish irroration. The discal stigmata are represented by cloudy round purple-blackish spots, their lower extremities connected in females by a streak of pale ground colour. The hindwings are pale ochreous yellowish in males, while they are rather dark fuscous in females. Males have a downwards-directed fringe of dense ochreous-yellow hair-scales along the lower margin of the cell, longest in the middle.
