= Lecithocera compsophila =

Scientific classification
- Domain: Eukaryota
- Kingdom: Animalia
- Phylum: Arthropoda
- Class: Insecta
- Order: Lepidoptera
- Family: Lecithoceridae
- Genus: Lecithocera
- Species: L. compsophila

Binomial name
- Lecithocera compsophila (Meyrick, 1911)

Synonyms
- Brachmia compsophila Meyrick, 1911

Species of moth in the genus Lecithocera

Lecithocera compsophila is a moth in the family Lecithoceridae. It was described by Edward Meyrick in 1911. It is found in Sri Lanka.

The wingspan is 13–17 mm. The forewings are light ochreous brown or sometimes fuscous, somewhat infuscated or darker suffused posteriorly. There are traces of a white oblique strigula from the costa before the middle, which is sometimes obsolete. The stigmata are faintly darker, the plical rather obliquely beyond the first discal, the second discal forming a transverse mark, but all sometimes quite obsolete. A fine oblique white strigula is found from the costa at three-fourths, where a faint angulated whitish line proceeds to the tornus. There is also a black apical dot, more or less edged with white above and beneath, as well as an interrupted blackish terminal line. The hindwings are fuscous, sometimes paler towards the base.
