= Lecithocera hypsipola =

Scientific classification
- Kingdom: Animalia
- Phylum: Arthropoda
- Class: Insecta
- Order: Lepidoptera
- Family: Lecithoceridae
- Genus: Lecithocera
- Species: L. hypsipola

Binomial name
- Lecithocera hypsipola Meyrick, 1926

Species of moth in the genus Lecithocera

Lecithocera hypsipola is a moth in the family Lecithoceridae. It was described by Edward Meyrick in 1926. It is found in northern India.

The wingspan is about 18 mm. The forewings are light yellow ochreous with the base of the costa suffused with dark fuscous. The discal stigmata are small, irregular and blackish, beneath the second an erect fuscous cloud from the dorsum with one or two blackish scales above it. The hindwings are pale greyish.
