= Lecithocera antiphractis =

Scientific classification
- Kingdom: Animalia
- Phylum: Arthropoda
- Class: Insecta
- Order: Lepidoptera
- Family: Lecithoceridae
- Genus: Lecithocera
- Species: L. antiphractis

Binomial name
- Lecithocera antiphractis Meyrick, 1921

Species of moth in the genus Lecithocera

Lecithocera antiphractis is a moth in the family Lecithoceridae. It was described by Edward Meyrick in 1921. It is found in Assam, India.

The wingspan is about 16 mm. The forewings are yellow ochreous, irregularly sprinkled with fuscous and with a streak of dark fuscous suffusion along the costa from the base to five-sixths. The dorsal edge is suffused with dark fuscous towards the base and the discal stigmata are dark fuscous. There is a narrow suffused dark fuscous terminal fascia, leaving the terminal edge pale ochreous. The hindwings are grey.
