= Lecithocera alpestra =

Scientific classification
- Kingdom: Animalia
- Phylum: Arthropoda
- Clade: Pancrustacea
- Class: Insecta
- Order: Lepidoptera
- Family: Lecithoceridae
- Genus: Lecithocera
- Species: L. alpestra

Binomial name
- Lecithocera alpestra Park, 2005

Species of moth in genus Lecithocera

Lecithocera alpestra is a moth in the family Lecithoceridae. It was described by Kyu-Tek Park in 2005. It is found in Thailand.
