= Lecithocera decorosa =

Scientific classification
- Kingdom: Animalia
- Phylum: Arthropoda
- Clade: Pancrustacea
- Class: Insecta
- Order: Lepidoptera
- Family: Lecithoceridae
- Genus: Lecithocera
- Species: L. decorosa

Binomial name
- Lecithocera decorosa Diakonoff, [1968]

Species of moth in genus Lecithocera

Lecithocera decorosa is a moth in the family Lecithoceridae. It was described by Alexey Diakonoff in 1968. It is found on Luzon in the Philippines.

== Appearance ==
The wingspan is about 13 mm. The forewings are pale ochreous greyish with a pointed rather narrow white streak from the base of the costa to its middle, containing a dark fuscous narrower streak along the base of the costal edge. The base of the white streak is indistinctly dilated and there is an excurved whitish band from the middle of the costa to the middle of the disc at two-thirds. An outward-oblique dark fuscous mark is found just below two-fifths of the costa, edged posteriorly with white, the first discal stigma blackish, elongate, at one-third, an irregular fuscous transverse mark on the dorsum slightly beyond the stigma. The second discal stigma is found at about three-fifths, it is very faint and roundish. There is also a blackish triangular spot on three-fourths of the costa, extended over the cilia. A strongly and regularly undulate direct white line is found from the costa beyond that patch to the tornus, outwards concave above and beneath, outwards convex in the middle. The apical part of the wing beyond this line is suffused with slate grey, the apex black, with three black marginal dots on the termen. The hindwings are pale bronze fuscous and glossy.
