= Lecithocera chlorogastra =

Scientific classification
- Kingdom: Animalia
- Phylum: Arthropoda
- Class: Insecta
- Order: Lepidoptera
- Family: Lecithoceridae
- Genus: Lecithocera
- Species: L. chlorogastra

Binomial name
- Lecithocera chlorogastra Meyrick, 1922

Species of moth in the genus Lecithocera

Lecithocera chlorogastra is a moth in the family Lecithoceridae. It was described by Edward Meyrick in 1922. It is found on Java in Indonesia.

The wingspan is about 23 mm. The forewings are dark purplish fuscous and the hindwings are rather dark bronzy fuscous.
