= Lecithocera symptomatica =

Scientific classification
- Domain: Eukaryota
- Kingdom: Animalia
- Phylum: Arthropoda
- Class: Insecta
- Order: Lepidoptera
- Family: Lecithoceridae
- Genus: Lecithocera
- Species: L. symptomatica

Binomial name
- Lecithocera symptomatica Meyrick, 1931

Synonyms
- Lecithocera syntomica

Species of moth in the genus Lecithocera

Lecithocera symptomatica is a moth in the family Lecithoceridae. It was described by Edward Meyrick in 1931. It is found in Myanmar.
