= Lecithocera grammophanes =

Scientific classification
- Kingdom: Animalia
- Phylum: Arthropoda
- Clade: Pancrustacea
- Class: Insecta
- Order: Lepidoptera
- Family: Lecithoceridae
- Genus: Lecithocera
- Species: L. grammophanes

Binomial name
- Lecithocera grammophanes Meyrick, 1926

Species of moth in the genus Lecithocera

Lecithocera grammophanes is a moth in the family Lecithoceridae. It was described by Edward Meyrick in 1926. It is found on Borneo.

The wingspan is about 17 mm. The forewings are dark fuscous with costal, median, and subdorsal blue-leaden-metallic streaks from the base to one-fourth, the spaces between these suffused with orange. Beyond these is a narrow straight fascia of ground colour, edged posteriorly by a slender orange line followed by a blue-leaden-metallic median band dilated dorsally. The second discal stigma forms a transverse pear shaped blackish spot margined orange, and there is an orange costal streak from the middle to five-sixths, anteriorly with a small dark fuscous spot followed by three approximated dots, beneath this a blue-leaden-metallic streak from the discal spot to its extremity. There are blue-leaden-metallic spots occupying the apex and tornus, almost meeting on the termen. The ground colour on the posterior two-thirds of the wing consists of suffusedly mixed orange linear scales and the terminal edge is blackish. The hindwings are rather dark grey.
