= Lecithocera barbifera =

Scientific classification
- Kingdom: Animalia
- Phylum: Arthropoda
- Class: Insecta
- Order: Lepidoptera
- Family: Lecithoceridae
- Genus: Lecithocera
- Species: L. barbifera

Binomial name
- Lecithocera barbifera Meyrick, 1922

Species of moth in the genus Lecithocera

Lecithocera barbifera is a moth in the family Lecithoceridae. It was described by Edward Meyrick in 1922. It is found on Java in Indonesia.

The wingspan is about 20 mm. The forewings are fuscous, with a faint violet tinge and with the costal edge ochreous whitish from beyond the middle to five-sixths and with a faint suffused costal dot at four-fifths. The hindwings are light grey.
