= Lecithocera dissonella =

Scientific classification
- Kingdom: Animalia
- Phylum: Arthropoda
- Class: Insecta
- Order: Lepidoptera
- Family: Lecithoceridae
- Genus: Lecithocera
- Species: L. dissonella

Binomial name
- Lecithocera dissonella (Walker, 1864)

Synonyms
- Patouissa dissonella Walker, 1864

Species of moth in genus Lecithocera

Lecithocera dissonella is a moth in the family Lecithoceridae. It was described by Francis Walker in 1864. It is found on Borneo.

Adults are pale cinereous-straw colour, the forewings ferruginous speckled, with two black points in the disc, one before the middle, the other beyond the middle, continued to the interior border by means of a brown streak. There is a row of black points along the apical part of the costa and along the exterior border. The hindwings are dark cinereous.
