= Lecithocera dracopis =

Scientific classification
- Kingdom: Animalia
- Phylum: Arthropoda
- Class: Insecta
- Order: Lepidoptera
- Family: Lecithoceridae
- Genus: Lecithocera
- Species: L. dracopis

Binomial name
- Lecithocera dracopis (Meyrick, 1921)

Synonyms
- Celetodes dracopis Meyrick, 1921

Species of moth in the genus Lecithocera

Lecithocera dracopis is a moth in the family Lecithoceridae. It was described by Edward Meyrick in 1921. It is found on Java in Indonesia.

The wingspan is about 10 mm. The forewings are ochreous whitish, speckled with fuscous and with a blackish mark on the base of the costa. The stigmata are rather large and black, the first discal smaller, the plical slightly before the first discal. There are some undefined groups of blackish irroration (sprinkles) along the apical part of the costa and termen. The hindwings are pale grey.
