= Lecithocera hemiacma =

Scientific classification
- Kingdom: Animalia
- Phylum: Arthropoda
- Class: Insecta
- Order: Lepidoptera
- Family: Lecithoceridae
- Genus: Lecithocera
- Species: L. hemiacma

Binomial name
- Lecithocera hemiacma Meyrick, 1910

Species of moth in the genus Lecithocera

Lecithocera hemiacma is a moth in the family Lecithoceridae. It was described by Edward Meyrick in 1910. It is found on Borneo.

The wingspan is about 12 mm. The forewings are light bronzy fuscous, sprinkled with dark fuscous. The discal stigmata are cloudy and dark fuscous, the first dot like, the second represented by a transverse mark. The hindwings are light grey.
