= Lecithocera isomitra =

Scientific classification
- Kingdom: Animalia
- Phylum: Arthropoda
- Class: Insecta
- Order: Lepidoptera
- Family: Lecithoceridae
- Genus: Lecithocera
- Species: L. isomitra

Binomial name
- Lecithocera isomitra Meyrick, 1914

Species of moth in the genus Lecithocera

Lecithocera isomitra is a moth in the family Lecithoceridae. It was described by Edward Meyrick in 1914. It is found in Malawi.

The wingspan is 13–14 mm. The forewings are dark violet slaty grey and the hindwings are grey.
