= Lecithocera glaphyritis =

Scientific classification
- Kingdom: Animalia
- Phylum: Arthropoda
- Class: Insecta
- Order: Lepidoptera
- Family: Lecithoceridae
- Genus: Lecithocera
- Species: L. glaphyritis

Binomial name
- Lecithocera glaphyritis Meyrick, 1918

Species of moth in the genus Lecithocera

Lecithocera glaphyritis is a moth in the family Lecithoceridae. It was described by Edward Meyrick in 1918. It is found in Sri Lanka.

The wingspan is about 14 mm. The forewings are very glossy ash grey and the hindwings are ochreous whitish, the apex suffused with pale grey.
