= Lecithocera deleastra =

Scientific classification
- Kingdom: Animalia
- Phylum: Arthropoda
- Class: Insecta
- Order: Lepidoptera
- Family: Lecithoceridae
- Genus: Lecithocera
- Species: L. deleastra

Binomial name
- Lecithocera deleastra (Meyrick, 1911)

Synonyms
- Brachmia deleastra Meyrick, 1911

Species of moth in the genus Lecithocera

Lecithocera deleastra is a moth in the family Lecithoceridae. It was described by Edward Meyrick in 1911. It is found in Sri Lanka.

The wingspan is 15–17 mm. The forewings are moderately dark purple fuscous. The stigmata are obscurely darker, the plical hardly beyond the first discal, the second discal forming a transverse mark. There is a somewhat oblique ochreous-whitish mark on the costa at three-fourths, where a faintly indicated very obtusely angulated pale line runs to the dorsum before the tornus. There is a dark terminal line. The hindwings are fuscous.
