= Lecithocera perfida =

Scientific classification
- Kingdom: Animalia
- Phylum: Arthropoda
- Class: Insecta
- Order: Lepidoptera
- Family: Lecithoceridae
- Genus: Lecithocera
- Species: L. perfida

Binomial name
- Lecithocera perfida Meyrick, 1918

Species of moth in the genus Lecithocera

Lecithocera perfida is a moth in the family Lecithoceridae. It was described by Edward Meyrick in 1918. It is found in southern India.

The wingspan is about 14 mm. The forewings are whitish ochreous slightly tinged with brownish posteriorly, with some scattered dark fuscous specks. The base of the costa is blackish and the discal stigmata are moderate and black, the second connected to the dorsum by a strong transverse bar of dark fuscous suffusion. There is a marginal series of cloudy blackish dots around the posterior part of the costa and termen. The hindwings are whitish grey, tinged with whitish ochreous towards the apex.
