= Lecithocera oxycona =

Scientific classification
- Kingdom: Animalia
- Phylum: Arthropoda
- Class: Insecta
- Order: Lepidoptera
- Family: Lecithoceridae
- Genus: Lecithocera
- Species: L. oxycona

Binomial name
- Lecithocera oxycona Meyrick, 1910

Species of moth in the genus Lecithocera

Lecithocera oxycona is a moth in the family Lecithoceridae. It was described by Edward Meyrick in 1910. It is found in southern India.

The wingspan is about 11 mm. The forewings are rather dark fuscous, somewhat pale sprinkled. There is a broad whitish-ochreous costal streak from the base to about 3/4rt, attenuated to a point posteriorly. The discal stigmata are cloudy and dark fuscous. The hindwings are grey.
