= Lecithocera frustrata =

Scientific classification
- Kingdom: Animalia
- Phylum: Arthropoda
- Class: Insecta
- Order: Lepidoptera
- Family: Lecithoceridae
- Genus: Lecithocera
- Species: L. frustrata

Binomial name
- Lecithocera frustrata Meyrick, 1918

Species of moth in the genus Lecithocera

Lecithocera frustrata is a moth in the family Lecithoceridae. It was described by Edward Meyrick in 1918. It is found in the Central African Republic.

The wingspan is about 10 mm. The forewings are dark fuscous and the hindwings are grey.
