= Lecithocera tylobathra =

Scientific classification
- Domain: Eukaryota
- Kingdom: Animalia
- Phylum: Arthropoda
- Class: Insecta
- Order: Lepidoptera
- Family: Lecithoceridae
- Genus: Lecithocera
- Species: L. tylobathra

Binomial name
- Lecithocera tylobathra Meyrick, 1931

Species of moth in the genus Lecithocera

Lecithocera tylobathra is a moth in the family Lecithoceridae. It was described by Edward Meyrick in 1931. It is found in China.
