= Lecithocera fuscedinella =

Scientific classification
- Kingdom: Animalia
- Phylum: Arthropoda
- Class: Insecta
- Order: Lepidoptera
- Family: Lecithoceridae
- Genus: Lecithocera
- Species: L. fuscedinella

Binomial name
- Lecithocera fuscedinella (Snellen, 1901)

Synonyms
- Snellenia fuscedinella Snellen, 1901

Species of moth in genus Lecithocera

Lecithocera fuscedinella is a moth in the family Lecithoceridae. It was described by Snellen in 1901. It is found on Java.

The wingspan is about 18 mm. The forewings are greyish-brown forewings without markings.
