= Lecithocera mesosura =

Scientific classification
- Kingdom: Animalia
- Phylum: Arthropoda
- Clade: Pancrustacea
- Class: Insecta
- Order: Lepidoptera
- Family: Lecithoceridae
- Genus: Lecithocera
- Species: L. mesosura

Binomial name
- Lecithocera mesosura C. S. Wu & Park, 1999

Species of moth in genus Lecithocera

Lecithocera mesosura is a moth in the family Lecithoceridae. It was described by Chun-Sheng Wu and Kyu-Tek Park in 1999. It is found in Sri Lanka.

The wingspan is about 11 mm.
