= Lecithocera cratophanes =

Scientific classification
- Kingdom: Animalia
- Phylum: Arthropoda
- Class: Insecta
- Order: Lepidoptera
- Family: Lecithoceridae
- Genus: Lecithocera
- Species: L. cratophanes

Binomial name
- Lecithocera cratophanes Meyrick, 1929

Species of moth in the genus Lecithocera

Lecithocera cratophanes is a moth in the family Lecithoceridae. It was described by Edward Meyrick in 1929. It is found in southern Vietnam.

The wingspan is about 21 mm.
