= Lecithocera diplosticta =

Scientific classification
- Kingdom: Animalia
- Phylum: Arthropoda
- Class: Insecta
- Order: Lepidoptera
- Family: Lecithoceridae
- Genus: Lecithocera
- Species: L. diplosticta

Binomial name
- Lecithocera diplosticta Meyrick, 1922

Species of moth in the genus Lecithocera

Lecithocera diplosticta is a moth in the family Lecithoceridae. It was described by Edward Meyrick in 1922. It is found on Java in Indonesia.

The wingspan is 22–23 mm. The forewings are greyish ochreous with the discal stigmata rather large and dark fuscous, the plical hardly indicated, close beneath the first discal. The terminal edge is finely infuscated. The hindwings are grey.
