= Lecithocera cordata =

Scientific classification
- Kingdom: Animalia
- Phylum: Arthropoda
- Class: Insecta
- Order: Lepidoptera
- Family: Lecithoceridae
- Genus: Lecithocera
- Species: L. cordata

Binomial name
- Lecithocera cordata (Meyrick, 1911)

Synonyms
- Brachmia cordata Meyrick, 1911

Species of moth in the genus Lecithocera

Lecithocera cordata is a moth in the family Lecithoceridae. It was described by Edward Meyrick in 1911. It is found in southern India.

The wingspan is about 18 mm. The forewings are purplish fuscous, irrorated (sprinkled) with blackish, more strongly and suffusedly towards the base, along the costa, and on the terminal area. There is a streak of ochreous-whitish suffusion along the dorsum from one-third to three-fourths. The stigmata are represented by cloudy blackish spots, the first discal roundish, the plical beneath this, larger and irregular, both of these irregularly edged posteriorly with white, the second discal transverse oval, edged posteriorly and slightly anteriorly with white. There is a strong whitish-ochreous subterminal line, indented on the upper half. The hindwings are fuscous whitish, gradually more infuscated posteriorly.
