= Lecithocera hispidiella =

Scientific classification
- Kingdom: Animalia
- Phylum: Arthropoda
- Clade: Pancrustacea
- Class: Insecta
- Order: Lepidoptera
- Family: Lecithoceridae
- Genus: Lecithocera
- Species: L. hispidiella

Binomial name
- Lecithocera hispidiella Park, 2012

Species of moth in genus Lecithocera

Lecithocera hispidiella is a moth in the family Lecithoceridae. It was described by Kyu-Tek Park in 2012. It is found in Papua New Guinea.
