= Lecithocera turcica =

Scientific classification
- Kingdom: Animalia
- Phylum: Arthropoda
- Clade: Pancrustacea
- Class: Insecta
- Order: Lepidoptera
- Family: Lecithoceridae
- Genus: Lecithocera
- Species: L. turcica

Binomial name
- Lecithocera turcica Gozmány & Mey, 2005

Species of moth in genus Lecithocera

Lecithocera turcica is a moth in the family Lecithoceridae. It was described by László Anthony Gozmány and Wolfram Mey in 2005. It is found in Turkey.
