= Lecithocera macrotoma =

Scientific classification
- Kingdom: Animalia
- Phylum: Arthropoda
- Class: Insecta
- Order: Lepidoptera
- Family: Lecithoceridae
- Genus: Lecithocera
- Species: L. macrotoma

Binomial name
- Lecithocera macrotoma Meyrick, 1918

Species of moth in the genus Lecithocera

Lecithocera macrotoma is a moth in the family Lecithoceridae. It was described by Edward Meyrick in 1918. It is found in China.
