= Lecithocera neosticta =

Scientific classification
- Kingdom: Animalia
- Phylum: Arthropoda
- Class: Insecta
- Order: Lepidoptera
- Family: Lecithoceridae
- Genus: Lecithocera
- Species: L. neosticta

Binomial name
- Lecithocera neosticta Meyrick, 1918

Species of moth in the genus Lecithocera

Lecithocera neosticta is a moth in the family Lecithoceridae. It was described by Edward Meyrick in 1918. It is found in southern India.

Its wingspan is about 14 mm. The forewings are fuscous irrorated (sprinkled) with darker. The discal stigmata are dark fuscous, the second short transverse. The hindwings are light grey.
