= Lecithocera perigypsa =

Scientific classification
- Kingdom: Animalia
- Phylum: Arthropoda
- Class: Insecta
- Order: Lepidoptera
- Family: Lecithoceridae
- Genus: Lecithocera
- Species: L. perigypsa

Binomial name
- Lecithocera perigypsa Meyrick, 1922

Species of moth in the genus Lecithocera

Lecithocera perigypsa is a moth in the family Lecithoceridae. It was described by Edward Meyrick in 1922. It is found on Sulawesi in Indonesia.

The wingspan is about 17 mm. The forewings are lilac fuscous with a suffused whitish costal streak from the base to the apex, shortly produced along the upper part of the termen. There are minute blackish marginal specks around the apex and termen. The hindwings are grey.
