= Lecithocera iresia =

Scientific classification
- Kingdom: Animalia
- Phylum: Arthropoda
- Class: Insecta
- Order: Lepidoptera
- Family: Lecithoceridae
- Genus: Lecithocera
- Species: L. iresia

Binomial name
- Lecithocera iresia (Meyrick, 1911)

Synonyms
- Brachmia iresia Meyrick, 1911

Species of moth in the genus Lecithocera

Lecithocera iresia is a moth in the family Lecithoceridae. It was described by Edward Meyrick in 1911. It is found in southern India.

The wingspan is 9–14 mm. The forewings are dark purplish grey. The stigmata are represented by small obscure darker spots, sometimes nearly obsolete, the plical somewhat beyond the first discal, the second discal transverse oval. There is a small whitish mark on the costa at three-fourths, where sometimes a faint slightly curved line of whitish scales runs to the tornus. The hindwings are grey.
