= Lecithocera choritis =

Scientific classification
- Kingdom: Animalia
- Phylum: Arthropoda
- Clade: Pancrustacea
- Class: Insecta
- Order: Lepidoptera
- Family: Lecithoceridae
- Genus: Lecithocera
- Species: L. choritis

Binomial name
- Lecithocera choritis Meyrick, 1910

Species of moth in the genus Lecithocera

Lecithocera choritis is a moth in the family Lecithoceridae. It was described by Edward Meyrick in 1910. It is found in southern India.

The wingspan is 21–23 mm. The forewings are pale ochreous yellowish, irregularly and variably irrorated (sprinkled) with purplish fuscous and dark fuscous. The discal stigmata are represented by round dark purplish-fuscous spots, connected by a central elongate patch of pale ground colour. The hindwings are grey.
