= Lecithocera nomaditis =

Scientific classification
- Kingdom: Animalia
- Phylum: Arthropoda
- Class: Insecta
- Order: Lepidoptera
- Family: Lecithoceridae
- Genus: Lecithocera
- Species: L. nomaditis

Binomial name
- Lecithocera nomaditis Meyrick, 1916

Species of moth in the genus Lecithocera

Lecithocera nomaditis is a moth in the family Lecithoceridae. It was described by Edward Meyrick in 1916. It is found on the Solomon Islands.

The wingspan is about 15 mm. The forewings are purple bronzy fuscous, darker towards the base of the costa and with the costal edge suffused with fulvous ochreous from one-third to near the apex. There is an indistinct darker transverse mark on the end of the cell and a dark fuscous terminal line. The hindwings are rather dark grey.
