= Lecithocera flavifusa =

Scientific classification
- Kingdom: Animalia
- Phylum: Arthropoda
- Class: Insecta
- Order: Lepidoptera
- Family: Lecithoceridae
- Genus: Lecithocera
- Species: L. flavifusa

Binomial name
- Lecithocera flavifusa Meyrick, 1926

Species of moth in the genus Lecithocera

Lecithocera flavifusa is a moth in the family Lecithoceridae. It was described by Edward Meyrick in 1926. It is found on Borneo.
