= Lecithocera innotatella =

Scientific classification
- Kingdom: Animalia
- Phylum: Arthropoda
- Class: Insecta
- Order: Lepidoptera
- Family: Lecithoceridae
- Genus: Lecithocera
- Species: L. innotatella

Binomial name
- Lecithocera innotatella (Walker, 1864)

Synonyms
- Tirallis innotatella Walker, 1864

Species of moth in genus Lecithocera

Lecithocera innotatella is a moth in the family Lecithoceridae. It was described by Francis Walker in 1864. It is found on Borneo.

Adults are gilded cinereous, slightly tinged with a fawn colour. The forewings are hardly rounded at the tips and the exterior border is almost straight, slightly oblique. The hindwings are rather darker than the forewings, very slightly hyaline (glass like).
