= Lecithocera praeses =

Scientific classification
- Kingdom: Animalia
- Phylum: Arthropoda
- Class: Insecta
- Order: Lepidoptera
- Family: Lecithoceridae
- Genus: Lecithocera
- Species: L. praeses

Binomial name
- Lecithocera praeses Meyrick, 1919

Species of moth in genus Lecithocera

Lecithocera praeses is a moth in the family Lecithoceridae. It is found in northern India.

The wingspan is about 25 mm. The forewings are fuscous, the first discal stigma obscurely indicated, the second forming a cloudy dark fuscous transverse mark. The hindwings are grey.
