= Lecithocera desolata =

Scientific classification
- Kingdom: Animalia
- Phylum: Arthropoda
- Class: Insecta
- Order: Lepidoptera
- Family: Lecithoceridae
- Genus: Lecithocera
- Species: L. desolata

Binomial name
- Lecithocera desolata Meyrick, 1918

Species of moth in the genus Lecithocera

Lecithocera desolata is a moth in the family Lecithoceridae. It was described by Edward Meyrick in 1918. It is found in southern India.

The wingspan is about 16 mm. The forewings are brownish ocherous, somewhat sprinkled with dark fuscous. The basal two-thirds of the costa is suffused with fuscous and the discal stigmata are dark fuscous. The hindwings are light grey.
