= Lecithocera luticostella =

Scientific classification
- Domain: Eukaryota
- Kingdom: Animalia
- Phylum: Arthropoda
- Class: Insecta
- Order: Lepidoptera
- Family: Lecithoceridae
- Genus: Lecithocera
- Species: L. luticostella

Binomial name
- Lecithocera luticostella Turati, 1926

Species of moth in genus Lecithocera

Lecithocera luticostella is a moth in the family Lecithoceridae. It was described by Turati in 1926. It is found in Libya.
