= Lecithocera storestis =

Scientific classification
- Kingdom: Animalia
- Phylum: Arthropoda
- Class: Insecta
- Order: Lepidoptera
- Family: Lecithoceridae
- Genus: Lecithocera
- Species: L. storestis

Binomial name
- Lecithocera storestis (Meyrick, 1911)

Synonyms
- Brachmia storestis Meyrick, 1911

Species of moth in the genus Lecithocera

Lecithocera storestis is a moth in the family Lecithoceridae. It was described by Edward Meyrick in 1911. It is found in Sri Lanka.

The wingspan is about 10 mm. The forewings are dark fuscous, with the stigmata represented by small cloudy blackish spots, the plical elongate, rather before the first discal. There is a small oblique whitish mark on costa at two-thirds and a cloudy blackish terminal line. The hindwings are grey.
