= Lecithocera leucoceros =

Scientific classification
- Kingdom: Animalia
- Phylum: Arthropoda
- Class: Insecta
- Order: Lepidoptera
- Family: Lecithoceridae
- Genus: Lecithocera
- Species: L. leucoceros

Binomial name
- Lecithocera leucoceros Meyrick, 1932

Species of moth in the genus Lecithocera

Lecithocera leucoceros is a moth in the family Lecithoceridae. It was described by Edward Meyrick in 1932. It is found in Japan and China.
