= Lecithocera raphidica =

Scientific classification
- Kingdom: Animalia
- Phylum: Arthropoda
- Clade: Pancrustacea
- Class: Insecta
- Order: Lepidoptera
- Family: Lecithoceridae
- Genus: Lecithocera
- Species: L. raphidica

Binomial name
- Lecithocera raphidica Gozmány, 1978

Species of moth in genus Lecithocera

Lecithocera raphidica is a moth in the family Lecithoceridae described by László Anthony Gozmány in 1978. It is found in Jiangsu, China.
