= Lecithocera puteolata =

Scientific classification
- Kingdom: Animalia
- Phylum: Arthropoda
- Class: Insecta
- Order: Lepidoptera
- Family: Lecithoceridae
- Genus: Lecithocera
- Species: L. puteolata

Binomial name
- Lecithocera puteolata (Meyrick, 1911)

Synonyms
- Brachmia puteolata Meyrick, 1911

Species of moth in the genus Lecithocera

Lecithocera puteolata is a moth in the family Lecithoceridae. It was described by Edward Meyrick in 1911. It is found in southern India.

The wingspan is 21–23 mm. The forewings are dark fuscous, slightly purplish tinged. The stigmata are represented by small blackish spots, the plical rather obliquely before the first discal, both these edged posteriorly with ochreous-whitish suffusion, the second discal similarly edged on both sides. The hindwings are whitish fuscous, becoming fuscous towards the termen and apex.
