= Lecithocera contracta =

Scientific classification
- Kingdom: Animalia
- Phylum: Arthropoda
- Class: Insecta
- Order: Lepidoptera
- Family: Lecithoceridae
- Genus: Lecithocera
- Species: L. contracta

Binomial name
- Lecithocera contracta Meyrick, 1918

Species of moth in the genus Lecithocera

Lecithocera contracta is a moth in the family Lecithoceridae. It was described by Edward Meyrick in 1918. It is found in southern India.

The wingspan is 11–13 mm. The forewings are rather dark fuscous. The discal stigmata are cloudy and blackish, the second transverse. The hindwings are grey.
