= Lecithocera pachyntis =

Scientific classification
- Kingdom: Animalia
- Phylum: Arthropoda
- Class: Insecta
- Order: Lepidoptera
- Family: Lecithoceridae
- Genus: Lecithocera
- Species: L. pachyntis

Binomial name
- Lecithocera pachyntis Meyrick, 1894

Species of moth in the genus Lecithocera

Lecithocera pachyntis is a moth in the family Lecithoceridae. It was described by Edward Meyrick in 1894. It is found in Myanmar.

The wingspan is 13–14 mm. The forewings are fuscous with a black dot in the disc at one-third, and another at two-thirds. The hindwings are rather light fuscous.
