= Lecithocera prudens =

Scientific classification
- Kingdom: Animalia
- Phylum: Arthropoda
- Class: Insecta
- Order: Lepidoptera
- Family: Lecithoceridae
- Genus: Lecithocera
- Species: L. prudens

Binomial name
- Lecithocera prudens Meyrick, 1918

Species of moth in the genus Lecithocera

Lecithocera prudens is a moth in the family Lecithoceridae. It was described by Edward Meyrick in 1918. It is found on New Guinea.

The wingspan is about 20 mm. The forewings are rather dark purplish fuscous. The discal stigmata are well marked and dark fuscous. The hindwings are grey.
