= Lecithocera octonias =

Scientific classification
- Kingdom: Animalia
- Phylum: Arthropoda
- Class: Insecta
- Order: Lepidoptera
- Family: Lecithoceridae
- Genus: Lecithocera
- Species: L. octonias

Binomial name
- Lecithocera octonias Meyrick, 1910

Species of moth in the genus Lecithocera

Lecithocera octonias is a moth in the family Lecithoceridae. It was described by Edward Meyrick in 1910. It is found on Borneo.

The wingspan is about 19 mm. The forewings are rather dark fuscous, the anterior three-fourths suffusedly mixed throughout with whitish ochreous. There is a straight narrow dark fuscous fascia at two-fifths, edged posteriorly with light ochreous yellow. An 8-shaped ochreous-yellow discal blotch is found on the end of the cell, filled with dark fuscous and there is a slightly incurved indistinct pale ochreous-yellowish subterminal line, enlarged and distinct on the costa, where it is preceded by a dark fuscous spot. The termen is suffused with dark fuscous. The hindwings are rather dark fuscous.
