= Lecithocera inepta =

Scientific classification
- Kingdom: Animalia
- Phylum: Arthropoda
- Class: Insecta
- Order: Lepidoptera
- Family: Lecithoceridae
- Genus: Lecithocera
- Species: L. inepta

Binomial name
- Lecithocera inepta Meyrick, 1926

Species of moth in the genus Lecithocera

Lecithocera inepta is a moth in the family Lecithoceridae. It was described by Edward Meyrick in 1926. It is found on Borneo.

The wingspan is about 20 mm. The forewings are brownish fuscous, the terminal edge slightly suffused with dark fuscous. The hindwings are light grey.
