= Lecithocera responsa =

Scientific classification
- Kingdom: Animalia
- Phylum: Arthropoda
- Class: Insecta
- Order: Lepidoptera
- Family: Lecithoceridae
- Genus: Lecithocera
- Species: L. responsa

Binomial name
- Lecithocera responsa Meyrick, 1918

Species of moth in the genus Lecithocera

Lecithocera responsa is a moth in the family Lecithoceridae. It was described by Edward Meyrick in 1918. It is found in Mumbai, India.
