= Lecithocera querula =

Scientific classification
- Kingdom: Animalia
- Phylum: Arthropoda
- Class: Insecta
- Order: Lepidoptera
- Family: Lecithoceridae
- Genus: Lecithocera
- Species: L. querula

Binomial name
- Lecithocera querula Meyrick, 1910

Species of moth in the genus Lecithocera

Lecithocera querula is a moth in the family Lecithoceridae. It was described by Edward Meyrick in 1910. It is found on Java in Indonesia.

The wingspan is about 17 mm. The forewings are pale yellow ochreous tinged with brownish, the basal and terminal areas and dorsal half irrorated (sprinkled) with fuscous and dark fuscous. The discal stigmata are moderate and dark fuscous. There is a slender somewhat oblique streak of darker irroration from the second to the dorsum. The hindwings are grey with a loose dorsal pencil of pale ochreous-yellowish hairs from the base.
