= Lecithocera improvisa =

Scientific classification
- Domain: Eukaryota
- Kingdom: Animalia
- Phylum: Arthropoda
- Class: Insecta
- Order: Lepidoptera
- Family: Lecithoceridae
- Genus: Lecithocera
- Species: L. improvisa

Binomial name
- Lecithocera improvisa Diakonoff, [1968]

Species of moth in genus Lecithocera

Lecithocera improvisa is a moth in the family Lecithoceridae. It was described by Alexey Diakonoff in 1968. It is found in the Philippines (Mindanao).

The wingspan is about 13.5 mm. The forewings are pale fuscous, irregularly clouded and dusted with darker fuscous. The stigmata are small and black, the first discal ill-defined, the second discal at three-fifths is rounded and the plical is slightly larger, suboval and found beyond one-fourth, the terminal edge with a series of rather suffused, not distinctly separate subtriangular small dots. The hindwings are glossy pale fuscous, finely dusted with darker fuscous.
