= Lecithocera eludens =

Scientific classification
- Kingdom: Animalia
- Phylum: Arthropoda
- Class: Insecta
- Order: Lepidoptera
- Family: Lecithoceridae
- Genus: Lecithocera
- Species: L. eludens

Binomial name
- Lecithocera eludens Meyrick, 1918

Species of moth in the genus Lecithocera

Lecithocera eludens is a moth in the family Lecithoceridae. It was described by Edward Meyrick in 1918. It is found in southern India.
