= Lecithocera acolasta =

Scientific classification
- Kingdom: Animalia
- Phylum: Arthropoda
- Class: Insecta
- Order: Lepidoptera
- Family: Lecithoceridae
- Genus: Lecithocera
- Species: L. acolasta

Binomial name
- Lecithocera acolasta Meyrick, 1919

Species of moth in genus Lecithocera

Lecithocera acolasta is a moth in the family Lecithoceridae. It was described by Edward Meyrick in 1919. It is found in southern India.

The wingspan is about 10 mm. The forewings are ochreous-whitish, tinged grey towards the termen. The discal stigmata are black and conspicuous, with a small spot of black irroration rather obliquely before the second towards the dorsum. There are four or five scattered black specks towards the apex. The hindwings are light grey, paler and thinly scaled anteriorly.
