= Lecithocera squalida =

Scientific classification
- Kingdom: Animalia
- Phylum: Arthropoda
- Clade: Pancrustacea
- Class: Insecta
- Order: Lepidoptera
- Family: Lecithoceridae
- Genus: Lecithocera
- Species: L. squalida

Binomial name
- Lecithocera squalida Gozmány, 1987

Species of moth in genus Lecithocera

Lecithocera squalida is a moth in the family Lecithoceridae. It is found in Thailand, China (Hunan, Jiangxi, Sichuan) and Taiwan.
