= Lecithocera xanthocosma =

Scientific classification
- Domain: Eukaryota
- Kingdom: Animalia
- Phylum: Arthropoda
- Class: Insecta
- Order: Lepidoptera
- Family: Lecithoceridae
- Genus: Lecithocera
- Species: L. xanthocosma

Binomial name
- Lecithocera xanthocosma (Meyrick, 1923)

Synonyms
- Brachmia xanthocosma Meyrick, 1923

Species of moth in genus Lecithocera

Lecithocera xanthocosma is a moth in the family Lecithoceridae. It was described by Edward Meyrick in 1923. It is found in Uganda.

The wingspan is 19–21 mm. The forewings are dark purple-fuscous and the hindwings are dark fuscous.
