= Lecithocera ancylota =

Scientific classification
- Kingdom: Animalia
- Phylum: Arthropoda
- Class: Insecta
- Order: Lepidoptera
- Family: Lecithoceridae
- Genus: Lecithocera
- Species: L. ancylota

Binomial name
- Lecithocera ancylota (Meyrick, 1894)

Synonyms
- Torodora ancylota Meyrick, 1894

Species of moth in the genus Lecithocera

Lecithocera ancylota is a moth in the family Lecithoceridae. It was described by Edward Meyrick in 1894. It is found in Myanmar.

The wingspan is about 19 mm. The forewings are ochreous fuscous, irrorated (sprinkled) with dark fuscous and with the extreme costal edge yellowish. There is a small black spot at the base of the costa and an erect black bar from the inner margin at one-third, reaching two-thirds of the way across the wing, dilated on the submedian fold. There is a small black spot on the costa at two-fifths and two dark fuscous dots transversely placed in the disc beyond the middle. A paler bent transverse line, preceded by a darker suffusion, is faintly indicated at four-fifths. The hindwings are light fuscous.
