= Lecithocera diligens =

Scientific classification
- Kingdom: Animalia
- Phylum: Arthropoda
- Class: Insecta
- Order: Lepidoptera
- Family: Lecithoceridae
- Genus: Lecithocera
- Species: L. diligens

Binomial name
- Lecithocera diligens Meyrick, 1922

Species of moth in the genus Lecithocera

Lecithocera diligens is a moth in the family Lecithoceridae. It was described by Edward Meyrick in 1922. It is found on Java in Indonesia.

The wingspan is about 23 mm. The forewings are dark purplish fuscous and the hindwings are dark fuscous.
