= Lecithocera telosperma =

Scientific classification
- Domain: Eukaryota
- Kingdom: Animalia
- Phylum: Arthropoda
- Class: Insecta
- Order: Lepidoptera
- Family: Lecithoceridae
- Genus: Lecithocera
- Species: L. telosperma

Binomial name
- Lecithocera telosperma Diakonoff, [1968]

Species of moth in genus Lecithocera

Lecithocera telosperma is a moth in the family Lecithoceridae. It was described by Alexey Diakonoff in 1968. It is found on Luzon in the Philippines.

The wingspan is about 17 mm. The forewings are pale fuscous grey olive, strongly suffused with dark fuscous purple, and partially, with brighter olive. There is an elongate patch of brighter olive suffusion along the basal third of the costa extending one-third across the wing, the lower half of the wing from the base to the end of the cell rather evenly suffused with dark fuscous purple. The discal stigmata are large and elongate, the first blackish purple, edged with olive, with a few white scales posteriorly, the second olive, anteriorly mixed with white scales, and centered with blackish purple along the veins. The posterior third of the wing is minutely strewn with white and there is a distinct marginal series of black dots on the ends of the veins along the posterior part of the costa, in the apex and along the termen, round dots becoming narrow strigulae downwards. The hindwings are whitish, suffused along the edges with bronze grey, the veins streaked with bronze grey.
