= Lecithocera castanoma =

Scientific classification
- Kingdom: Animalia
- Phylum: Arthropoda
- Clade: Pancrustacea
- Class: Insecta
- Order: Lepidoptera
- Family: Lecithoceridae
- Genus: Lecithocera
- Species: L. castanoma

Binomial name
- Lecithocera castanoma Wu, 1997

Species of moth in genus Lecithocera

Lecithocera castanoma is a moth in the family Lecithoceridae. It was described by Chun-Sheng Wu in 1997. It is found in Thailand and Guangdong, China.
