= Lecithocera protoma =

Scientific classification
- Kingdom: Animalia
- Phylum: Arthropoda
- Class: Insecta
- Order: Lepidoptera
- Family: Lecithoceridae
- Genus: Lecithocera
- Species: L. protoma

Binomial name
- Lecithocera protoma Meyrick, 1914

Species of moth in the genus Lecithocera

Lecithocera protoma is a moth in the family Lecithoceridae. It was described by Edward Meyrick in 1914. It is found in Ghana.

The wingspan is about 14 mm. The forewings are rather dark purplish fuscous with an oblique ochreous-whitish strigula on the costa at four-fifths, where a faint line of scales is indicated to the tornus. The hindwings are rather dark grey.
