= Lecithocera yoshiyasui =

Scientific classification
- Kingdom: Animalia
- Phylum: Arthropoda
- Clade: Pancrustacea
- Class: Insecta
- Order: Lepidoptera
- Family: Lecithoceridae
- Genus: Lecithocera
- Species: L. yoshiyasui

Binomial name
- Lecithocera yoshiyasui Park, 2006

Species of moth in genus Lecithocera

Lecithocera yoshiyasui is a moth in the family Lecithoceridae. It was described by Kyu-Tek Park in 2006. It is found in Thailand.
