= Lecithocera carcinopsis =

Scientific classification
- Kingdom: Animalia
- Phylum: Arthropoda
- Class: Insecta
- Order: Lepidoptera
- Family: Lecithoceridae
- Genus: Lecithocera
- Species: L. carcinopsis

Binomial name
- Lecithocera carcinopsis Meyrick, 1929

Species of moth in the genus Lecithocera

Lecithocera carcinopsis is a moth in the family Lecithoceridae. It was described by Edward Meyrick in 1929. It is found in southern India.

The wingspan is about 11 mm. The forewings are whitish ochreous irrorated (sprinkled) with fuscous and dark fuscous. The hindwings are pale grey.
