= Lecithocera tumidosa =

Scientific classification
- Kingdom: Animalia
- Phylum: Arthropoda
- Clade: Pancrustacea
- Class: Insecta
- Order: Lepidoptera
- Family: Lecithoceridae
- Genus: Lecithocera
- Species: L. tumidosa

Binomial name
- Lecithocera tumidosa Park & C. S. Wu, 2010

Species of moth in genus Lecithocera

Lecithocera tumidosa is a moth in the family Lecithoceridae. It was described by Kyu-Tek Park and Chun-Sheng Wu in 2010. It is found in Thailand.
