= Lecithocera cucullata =

Scientific classification
- Kingdom: Animalia
- Phylum: Arthropoda
- Clade: Pancrustacea
- Class: Insecta
- Order: Lepidoptera
- Family: Lecithoceridae
- Genus: Lecithocera
- Species: L. cucullata

Binomial name
- Lecithocera cucullata Meyrick, 1914

Synonyms
- Asmenistis cucullata (Meyrick, 1914)

Species of moth in the genus Lecithocera

Lecithocera cucullata is a moth in the family Lecithoceridae. It was described by Edward Meyrick in 1914. It is found in Mozambique.

The wingspan is about 14 mm. The forewings are light yellow ochreous with a dark purplish-fuscous wedge-shaped spot on the base of the costa. The discal stigmata are dark fuscous and there is a broad suffused fuscous band occupying the terminal third of the wing. The hindwings are dark grey.
