= Lecithocera mocquerysella =

Scientific classification
- Kingdom: Animalia
- Phylum: Arthropoda
- Class: Insecta
- Order: Lepidoptera
- Family: Lecithoceridae
- Genus: Lecithocera
- Species: L. mocquerysella

Binomial name
- Lecithocera mocquerysella Viette, 1955

Species of moth in genus Lecithocera

Lecithocera mocquerysella is a moth in the family Lecithoceridae, genus Lecithocera. It was described by Pierre Viette in 1955. It is found in Madagascar.
