= Lecithocera dirupta =

Scientific classification
- Kingdom: Animalia
- Phylum: Arthropoda
- Class: Insecta
- Order: Lepidoptera
- Family: Lecithoceridae
- Genus: Lecithocera
- Species: L. dirupta

Binomial name
- Lecithocera dirupta Meyrick, 1923

Species of moth in the genus Lecithocera

Lecithocera dirupta is a moth in the family Lecithoceridae. It was described by Edward Meyrick in 1923. It is found in southern India.

The wingspan is about 15 millimetres (0.59 in). The forewings are ochreous whitish, slightly sprinkled with fuscous, the base of the costa is dark fuscous. There is a minute black strigula beneath the costa near the base. The stigmata are blackish, the discal forming moderate spots, the plical forming a streak extending from beneath the first discal halfway to the base, an elongate spot beneath the second discal, and extending anteriorly before it. There is some irregular fuscous suffusion around these markings, and the veins between the cell and the termen more or less streaked with dark fuscous suffusion, especially 7 and 8. There is also an irregular terminal line of dark fuscous suffusion. The hindwings are whitish grey.
