= Lecithocera affusa =

Scientific classification
- Kingdom: Animalia
- Phylum: Arthropoda
- Class: Insecta
- Order: Lepidoptera
- Family: Lecithoceridae
- Genus: Lecithocera
- Species: L. affusa

Binomial name
- Lecithocera affusa Meyrick, 1923

Species of moth in the genus Lecithocera

Lecithocera affusa is a moth in the family Lecithoceridae. It was described by Edward Meyrick in 1923. It is found in Assam, India.

The wingspan is about 16 mm. The forewings are pale ochreous slightly speckled with grey. The discal stigmata are small and blackish grey. The hindwings are rather dark grey.
