= Lecithocera proclivis =

Scientific classification
- Kingdom: Animalia
- Phylum: Arthropoda
- Class: Insecta
- Order: Lepidoptera
- Family: Lecithoceridae
- Genus: Lecithocera
- Species: L. proclivis

Binomial name
- Lecithocera proclivis Meyrick, 1910

Species of moth in the genus Lecithocera

Lecithocera proclivis is a moth in the family Lecithoceridae. It was described by Edward Meyrick in 1910. It is found in southern India.

The wingspan is 16–17 mm. The forewings are brown sprinkled with dark fuscous. The discal stigmata are dark fuscous, the second connected with the dorsum by a small patch of dark fuscous irroration. The hindwings are grey.
