= Lecithocera gozmanyi =

Scientific classification
- Domain: Eukaryota
- Kingdom: Animalia
- Phylum: Arthropoda
- Class: Insecta
- Order: Lepidoptera
- Family: Lecithoceridae
- Genus: Lecithocera
- Species: L. gozmanyi

Binomial name
- Lecithocera gozmanyi Pathania & Rose, 2004

Species of moth in genus Lecithocera

Lecithocera gozmanyi is a moth in the family Lecithoceridae. It was described by Pathania and Rose in 2004. It is found in India (Dehradun, Punjab).
