= Lecithocera fausta =

Scientific classification
- Kingdom: Animalia
- Phylum: Arthropoda
- Class: Insecta
- Order: Lepidoptera
- Family: Lecithoceridae
- Genus: Lecithocera
- Species: L. fausta

Binomial name
- Lecithocera fausta Meyrick, 1910

Species of moth in the genus Lecithocera

Lecithocera fausta is a moth in the family Lecithoceridae. It was described by Edward Meyrick in 1910. It is found on Luzon in the Philippines.

The wingspan is about 26 mm. The forewings are pale ochreous yellowish, slightly sprinkled with fuscous and dark fuscous specks. The discal stigmata are small and dark fuscous with a slight rather oblique shade of dark fuscous irroration (sprinkles) between the second and the dorsum. The apical margin is fuscous. The hindwings are whitish yellowish.
