= Lecithocera strenua =

Scientific classification
- Domain: Eukaryota
- Kingdom: Animalia
- Phylum: Arthropoda
- Class: Insecta
- Order: Lepidoptera
- Family: Lecithoceridae
- Genus: Lecithocera
- Species: L. strenua

Binomial name
- Lecithocera strenua Diakonoff, [1968]

Species of moth in genus Lecithocera

Lecithocera strenua is a moth in the family Lecithoceridae. It was described by Alexey Diakonoff in 1968. It is found on Mindanao in the Philippines.

The wingspan is about 20 mm. The forewings are dull blackish brown with slender yellow streaks arranged as follows: one short, from beyond the base to one-fifth just below the fold. Another, parallel to this from the base, running below the costa, to one-third, merging into a third, transverse, slightly curved fascia, dilated on the costa, slender below. There is a rounded conspicuous black patch on the dorsum, between the first and third fascia. There are shining metallic-leaden streaks with a bluish or greenish tinge, along the basal one-third of the costa above the second yellow streak, another below this. There is also a broad submedian transverse band, immediately following the transverse yellow streak. A slender streak is found below the posterior half of the costa to well before the apex, encircled by yellowish-tawny color, forming an elongate oval, edged posteriorly with black. There is also a broad metallic marginal band in the apex and along the termen, irregularly dentate anteriorly, sharply and narrowly edged posteriorly by dull black. The hindwings deep fuscous with a faint bronze tinge.
