= Lecithocera pulcherrimella =

Scientific classification
- Kingdom: Animalia
- Phylum: Arthropoda
- Class: Insecta
- Order: Lepidoptera
- Family: Lecithoceridae
- Genus: Lecithocera
- Species: L. pulcherrimella

Binomial name
- Lecithocera pulcherrimella (Walker, 1866)

Synonyms
- Siovata pulcherrimella Walker, 1866

Species of moth in genus Lecithocera

Lecithocera pulcherrimella is a moth in the family Lecithoceridae. It was described by Francis Walker in 1866. It is found in Java, Indonesia.

Adults are cupreous brown, the forewings tinged with chalybeous blue for three-fourths of the length from the base and there are three ochraceous black-bordered patches, the first patch basal and the second antemedial. The third is postmedial and there are a few ochraceous speckles between the third patch and a chalybeous-blue submarginal line.
