= Lecithocera docilis =

Scientific classification
- Domain: Eukaryota
- Kingdom: Animalia
- Phylum: Arthropoda
- Class: Insecta
- Order: Lepidoptera
- Family: Lecithoceridae
- Genus: Lecithocera
- Species: L. docilis

Binomial name
- Lecithocera docilis Diakonoff, [1968]

Species of moth in genus Lecithocera

Lecithocera docilis is a moth in the family Lecithoceridae. It was described by Alexey Diakonoff in 1968. It is found on Luzon in the Philippines.

The wingspan is about 14 mm. The forewings are pale ochreous with a narrow fuscous streak along the base of the costal edge. The second discal stigma is small and light fuscous. The hindwings are pale fuscous grey, the apical half tinged pale ochreous.
