= Lecithocera asarota =

Scientific classification
- Kingdom: Animalia
- Phylum: Arthropoda
- Class: Insecta
- Order: Lepidoptera
- Family: Lecithoceridae
- Genus: Lecithocera
- Species: L. asarota

Binomial name
- Lecithocera asarota Meyrick, 1925

Species of moth in the genus Lecithocera

Lecithocera asarota is a moth in the family Lecithoceridae. It was described by Edward Meyrick in 1925. It is found on Sumatra in Indonesia.
