= Lecithocera acuta =

Scientific classification
- Domain: Eukaryota
- Kingdom: Animalia
- Phylum: Arthropoda
- Class: Insecta
- Order: Lepidoptera
- Family: Lecithoceridae
- Genus: Lecithocera
- Species: L. acuta

Binomial name
- Lecithocera acuta Wadhawan & Walia, 2007

Species of moth in genus Lecithocera

Lecithocera acuta is a moth in the family Lecithoceridae. It was described by Wadhawan and Walia in 2007. It is found in India.
