= Lecithocera coleasta =

Scientific classification
- Kingdom: Animalia
- Phylum: Arthropoda
- Class: Insecta
- Order: Lepidoptera
- Family: Lecithoceridae
- Genus: Lecithocera
- Species: L. coleasta

Binomial name
- Lecithocera coleasta Meyrick, 1918

Species of moth in the genus Lecithocera

Lecithocera coleasta is a moth in the family Lecithoceridae. It was described by Edward Meyrick in 1918. It is found on New Guinea.

The wingspan is about 13 mm. The forewings are dark fuscous with a broad whitish-ochreous costal stripe throughout, the lower edge irregular at the base just reaching the dorsum, obtusely prominent beyond the middle, then irregularly narrowed to the apex, the costal edge suffused with dark fuscous towards the base. The hindwings are grey.
