= Lecithocera dubitans =

Scientific classification
- Kingdom: Animalia
- Phylum: Arthropoda
- Class: Insecta
- Order: Lepidoptera
- Family: Lecithoceridae
- Genus: Lecithocera
- Species: L. dubitans

Binomial name
- Lecithocera dubitans Meyrick, 1926

Species of moth in the genus Lecithocera

Lecithocera dubitans is a moth in the family Lecithoceridae. It was described by Edward Meyrick in 1926. It is found in Mumbai, India.

The wingspan is about 22 mm. The forewings are pale ochreous with some scattered fuscous specks, in females with some fuscous suffused irroration (sprinkles) towards the costa posteriorly. The discal stigmata are small and blackish, the second transversely double. In females, there is a suffused fuscous subtriangular spot on the dorsum towards the tornus touching the second discal. The hindwings are pale ochreous in males and pale grey in females, suffused with ochreous whitish towards the costa and posteriorly.
