= Lecithocera obsignata =

Scientific classification
- Kingdom: Animalia
- Phylum: Arthropoda
- Class: Insecta
- Order: Lepidoptera
- Family: Lecithoceridae
- Genus: Lecithocera
- Species: L. obsignata

Binomial name
- Lecithocera obsignata Meyrick, 1914

Species of moth in the genus Lecithocera

Lecithocera obsignata is a moth in the family Lecithoceridae. It was described by Edward Meyrick in 1914. It is found in Malawi.

The wingspan is about 11 mm. The forewings are pale yellow ochreous, towards the termen tinged with fuscous and sprinkled with dark fuscous. The costal edge is blackish at the base and the discal stigmata are moderately large and black. The hindwings are pale grey suffused with whitish ochreous.
