= Lecithocera elephantopa =

Scientific classification
- Kingdom: Animalia
- Phylum: Arthropoda
- Class: Insecta
- Order: Lepidoptera
- Family: Lecithoceridae
- Genus: Lecithocera
- Species: L. elephantopa

Binomial name
- Lecithocera elephantopa (Meyrick, 1910)

Synonyms
- Brachmia elephantopa Meyrick, 1910

Species of moth in the genus Lecithocera

Lecithocera elephantopa is a moth in the family Lecithoceridae. It was described by Edward Meyrick in 1910. It is found in southern India and Bengal.

The wingspan is 16–21 mm. The forewings are dark slaty fuscous. The stigmata are cloudy and black, the plical beneath the first discal, both often more or less elongate. The hindwings are fuscous.
