= Lecithocera sophronopa =

Scientific classification
- Domain: Eukaryota
- Kingdom: Animalia
- Phylum: Arthropoda
- Class: Insecta
- Order: Lepidoptera
- Family: Lecithoceridae
- Genus: Lecithocera
- Species: L. sophronopa

Binomial name
- Lecithocera sophronopa Diakonoff, [1968]

Species of moth in genus Lecithocera

Lecithocera sophronopa is a moth in the family Lecithoceridae. It was described by Alexey Diakonoff in 1968. It is found on Luzon in the Philippines.

The wingspan is about 15 mm. The forewings are pale fuscous touched with creamy, strewn throughout with rather dense fuscous scales. The markings are dark fuscous. There is an ill-defined triangular small basal patch with a very inwards-oblique edge and obliterate lower third. A well-defined, somewhat irregular interrupted marginal narrow streak is found around more than the posterior fourth of the wing. The stigmata are irregular, about equal, the first discal beyond one-third of the wing, the plical below and somewhat before it, the second discal before two-thirds. The hindwings are fuscous, rather thinly scaled.
