= Lecithocera nepalica =

Scientific classification
- Kingdom: Animalia
- Phylum: Arthropoda
- Clade: Pancrustacea
- Class: Insecta
- Order: Lepidoptera
- Family: Lecithoceridae
- Genus: Lecithocera
- Species: L. nepalica

Binomial name
- Lecithocera nepalica Gozmány, 1973

Species of moth in genus Lecithocera

Lecithocera nepalica is a moth in the family Lecithoceridae. It was described by László Anthony Gozmány in 1973. It is found in Nepal.
