= Lecithocera niptanensis =

Scientific classification
- Kingdom: Animalia
- Phylum: Arthropoda
- Class: Insecta
- Order: Lepidoptera
- Family: Lecithoceridae
- Genus: Lecithocera
- Species: L. niptanensis

Binomial name
- Lecithocera niptanensis Park, 2012

Species of moth in genus Lecithocera

Lecithocera niptanensis is a moth in the family Lecithoceridae first described by Kyu-Tek Park in 2012. It is found in Indonesia (Irian Jaya) and Papua New Guinea.

The wingspan is 12–13 millimetres (0.47–0.51 in).

== Etymology ==
The species name is derived from one of the localities (Niptan District) of the type specimens.
