= Lecithocera cornutima =

Scientific classification
- Kingdom: Animalia
- Phylum: Arthropoda
- Clade: Pancrustacea
- Class: Insecta
- Order: Lepidoptera
- Family: Lecithoceridae
- Genus: Lecithocera
- Species: L. cornutima

Binomial name
- Lecithocera cornutima Park, 2009

Species of moth in genus Lecithocera

Lecithocera cornutima is a moth in the family Lecithoceridae. It was described by Kyu-Tek Park in 2009. It is found in Thailand.

The wingspan is 12.5–14 mm.

== Etymology ==
The species name is derived from Latin cornut (meaning horned) with the Latin superlative ending imus(a).
