= Lecithocera masoalella =

Scientific classification
- Kingdom: Animalia
- Phylum: Arthropoda
- Class: Insecta
- Order: Lepidoptera
- Family: Lecithoceridae
- Genus: Lecithocera
- Species: L. masoalella

Binomial name
- Lecithocera masoalella Viette, 1955

Species of moth in genus Lecithocera

Lecithocera masoalella is a moth in the family Lecithoceridae. It was described by Viette in 1955. It is found in Madagascar.
