= Lecithocera jugalis =

Scientific classification
- Domain: Eukaryota
- Kingdom: Animalia
- Phylum: Arthropoda
- Class: Insecta
- Order: Lepidoptera
- Family: Lecithoceridae
- Genus: Lecithocera
- Species: L. jugalis

Binomial name
- Lecithocera jugalis Meyrick, 1918

Species of moth in the genus Lecithocera

Lecithocera jugalis is a moth in the family Lecithoceridae. It was described by Edward Meyrick in 1918. It is found in southern India.

The wingspan is about 11 mm. The forewings are pale ochreous, suffused with light fuscous except towards the costa anteriorly. The discal stigmata are black. The hindwings are grey.
