= Lecithocera acribostola =

Scientific classification
- Domain: Eukaryota
- Kingdom: Animalia
- Phylum: Arthropoda
- Class: Insecta
- Order: Lepidoptera
- Family: Lecithoceridae
- Genus: Lecithocera
- Species: L. acribostola

Binomial name
- Lecithocera acribostola Diakonoff, [1968]

Species of moth in genus Lecithocera

Lecithocera acribostola is a moth in the family Lecithoceridae. It was described by Alexey Diakonoff in 1968. It is found on Luzon in the Philippines.

The wingspan is about 15 mm. The forewings are greyish bronze fuscous, with a silky gloss. The markings are white. There is a moderate, pointed and suffused streak from the base to two-fifths of the costa, containing a fuscous short streak along the base of the costal margin and a direct transverse submedian fascia, with slightly suffused and serrulate edges, strongly extended posteriorly along the upper third, slender elsewhere. More than the apical fifth of the wing is white, the anterior edge straight, well defined, slightly outwards oblique. The apex and termen have a narrow blackish fascia and there is a series of irregular subtriangular fuscous small spots between the veins, forming a straight series beyond the anterior edge of the white apical patch. The hindwings are rather dark fuscous bronze, darker fuscous towards the apex, paler in the center, the bases of the scales transparent.
