= Lecithocera trigonopsis =

Scientific classification
- Kingdom: Animalia
- Phylum: Arthropoda
- Class: Insecta
- Order: Lepidoptera
- Family: Lecithoceridae
- Genus: Lecithocera
- Species: L. trigonopsis

Binomial name
- Lecithocera trigonopsis (Meyrick, 1907)

Synonyms
- Tiriza trigonopsis Meyrick, 1907

Species of moth in the genus Lecithocera

Lecithocera trigonopsis is a moth in the family Lecithoceridae. It was described by Edward Meyrick in 1907. It is found in the Himalayas.

The wingspan is 21–24 mm. The forewings are light fuscous or brownish, suffusedly mixed with whitish ochreous and with a suffused dark fuscous spot on the base of the costa, as well as an elongate-triangular dark fuscous patch extending in the disc from near the base to one-third. There is an undefined dark fuscous dot beneath the costa just beyond this and a small triangular dark fuscous spot in the disc at three-fifths. A pale line, preceded by darker suffusion, is found from three-fourths of the costa to four-fifths of the dorsum, slightly indented above the middle. The hindwings are whitish grey.
