= Lecithocera amphigrapta =

Scientific classification
- Kingdom: Animalia
- Phylum: Arthropoda
- Class: Insecta
- Order: Lepidoptera
- Family: Lecithoceridae
- Genus: Lecithocera
- Species: L. amphigrapta

Binomial name
- Lecithocera amphigrapta Meyrick, 1926

Species of moth in the genus Lecithocera

Lecithocera amphigrapta is a moth in the family Lecithoceridae. It was described by Edward Meyrick in 1926. It is found on Borneo.

The wingspan is about 14 mm. The forewings are light ashy fuscous. The markings are blackish, edged with ochreous yellow. There is a short longitudinal mark towards the costa near the base and an oblong spot on the costa before the middle. A large irregular-trapezoidal blotch is found in the disc before the middle, its base resting on the fold and there is a transverse-oval blotch in the disc beyond the middle, as well as a blackish fascia near and parallel to the termen, margined only by two yellowish dots on the lower half of the posterior edge and a mark on the dorsal edge. The costal edge is ochreous yellow from the antemedian spot to the fascia and the apical edge is blackish. The hindwings are grey.
