= Lecithocera stomobapta =

Scientific classification
- Kingdom: Animalia
- Phylum: Arthropoda
- Class: Insecta
- Order: Lepidoptera
- Family: Lecithoceridae
- Genus: Lecithocera
- Species: L. stomobapta

Binomial name
- Lecithocera stomobapta Meyrick, 1929

Species of moth in the genus Lecithocera

Lecithocera stomobapta is a moth in the family Lecithoceridae. It was described by Edward Meyrick in 1929. It is found in southern India.

The wingspan is 12–14 mm.
