= Lecithocera barbata =

Scientific classification
- Kingdom: Animalia
- Phylum: Arthropoda
- Clade: Pancrustacea
- Class: Insecta
- Order: Lepidoptera
- Family: Lecithoceridae
- Genus: Lecithocera
- Species: L. barbata

Binomial name
- Lecithocera barbata Meyrick, 1933

Species of moth in the genus Lecithocera

Lecithocera barbata is a moth in the family Lecithoceridae. It was described by Edward Meyrick in 1933. It is found in the former Orientale Province of the Democratic Republic of the Congo.
