= Lecithocera alcestis =

Scientific classification
- Kingdom: Animalia
- Phylum: Arthropoda
- Class: Insecta
- Order: Lepidoptera
- Family: Lecithoceridae
- Genus: Lecithocera
- Species: L. alcestis

Binomial name
- Lecithocera alcestis Meyrick, 1923

Species of moth in the genus Lecithocera

Lecithocera alcestis is a moth in the family Lecithoceridae. It was described by Edward Meyrick in 1923. It is found in southern India.

The wingspan is 13–16 mm. The forewings are light fuscous with a cloudy ochreous-whitish dot on the costa at four-fifths. The hindwings are grey, paler anteriorly.
