= Lecithocera bipunctella =

Scientific classification
- Kingdom: Animalia
- Phylum: Arthropoda
- Class: Insecta
- Order: Lepidoptera
- Family: Lecithoceridae
- Genus: Lecithocera
- Species: L. bipunctella

Binomial name
- Lecithocera bipunctella (Snellen, 1903)

Species of moth in genus Lecithocera

Lecithocera bipunctella is a moth in the family Lecithoceridae. It was described by Snellen in 1903. It is found in Indonesia (Java).

The wingspan is about 22 mm. The forewings are brownish-yellow, with a somewhat lighter margin and a black dot in the middle of the cell, and another under the cross vein. The hindwings are light yellowish-grey.
