= Lecithocera semirupta =

Scientific classification
- Kingdom: Animalia
- Phylum: Arthropoda
- Class: Insecta
- Order: Lepidoptera
- Family: Lecithoceridae
- Genus: Lecithocera
- Species: L. semirupta

Binomial name
- Lecithocera semirupta Meyrick, 1910

Species of moth in the genus Lecithocera

Lecithocera semirupta is a moth in the family Lecithoceridae. It was described by Edward Meyrick in 1910. It is found in Assam, India.

The wingspan is about 16 mm. The forewings are rather dark ashy fuscous. The stigmata are dark fuscous, the plical beneath the first discal, the second discal connected with the dorsum by a dark fuscous bar. The hindwings are grey.
