= Lecithocera palpella =

Scientific classification
- Domain: Eukaryota
- Kingdom: Animalia
- Phylum: Arthropoda
- Class: Insecta
- Order: Lepidoptera
- Family: Lecithoceridae
- Genus: Lecithocera
- Species: L. palpella

Binomial name
- Lecithocera palpella Bradley, 1961

Species of moth in genus Lecithocera

Lecithocera palpella is a moth in the family Lecithoceridae. It was described by John David Bradley in 1961. It is found on Guadalcanal in the Solomon Islands.
