= Lecithocera ladrone =

Scientific classification
- Kingdom: Animalia
- Phylum: Arthropoda
- Clade: Pancrustacea
- Class: Insecta
- Order: Lepidoptera
- Family: Lecithoceridae
- Genus: Lecithocera
- Species: L. ladrone

Binomial name
- Lecithocera ladrone Gozmány, 2002

Species of moth in genus Lecithocera

Lecithocera ladrone is a moth in the family Lecithoceridae. It was described by László Anthony Gozmány in 2002. It is found in Himachal Pradesh, India.
