= Lecithocera immobilis =

Scientific classification
- Kingdom: Animalia
- Phylum: Arthropoda
- Class: Insecta
- Order: Lepidoptera
- Family: Lecithoceridae
- Genus: Lecithocera
- Species: L. immobilis

Binomial name
- Lecithocera immobilis Meyrick, 1918

Species of moth in the genus Lecithocera

Lecithocera immobilis is a moth in the family Lecithoceridae. It was described by Edward Meyrick in 1918. It is found in southern India.

The wingspan is about 13 mm. The forewings are dark fuscous, slightly tinged with purple. The stigmata are darker, cloudy and obscure, the plical beneath the first discal. The hindwings are grey whitish.
