= Lecithocera leucomastis =

Scientific classification
- Kingdom: Animalia
- Phylum: Arthropoda
- Clade: Pancrustacea
- Class: Insecta
- Order: Lepidoptera
- Family: Lecithoceridae
- Genus: Lecithocera
- Species: L. leucomastis

Binomial name
- Lecithocera leucomastis Diakonoff, [1968]

Species of moth in genus Lecithocera

Lecithocera leucomastis is a moth in the family Lecithoceridae. It was described by Alexey Diakonoff in 1968. It is found on Luzon in the Philippines.

The wingspan is about 15.5 mm. The forewings are rather dark purple fuscous with a distinct gloss. The base of the wing is slightly darker. The hindwings are glossy pale bronze fuscous.
