= Lecithocera anympha =

Scientific classification
- Kingdom: Animalia
- Phylum: Arthropoda
- Class: Insecta
- Order: Lepidoptera
- Family: Lecithoceridae
- Genus: Lecithocera
- Species: L. anympha

Binomial name
- Lecithocera anympha Meyrick, 1916

Species of moth in the genus Lecithocera

Lecithocera anympha is a moth in the family Lecithoceridae. It was described by Edward Meyrick in 1916. It is found in northern Australia.

The wingspan is about 10 mm. The forewings are dark purple fuscous, the stigmata represented by obscure cloudy blackish spots, the plical beneath the first discal. The hindwings are rather light grey.
