= Lecithocera bariella =

Scientific classification
- Kingdom: Animalia
- Phylum: Arthropoda
- Class: Insecta
- Order: Lepidoptera
- Family: Lecithoceridae
- Genus: Lecithocera
- Species: L. bariella

Binomial name
- Lecithocera bariella Viette, 1958

Species of moth in genus Lecithocera

Lecithocera bariella is a moth in the family Lecithoceridae. It was described by Viette in 1958. It is found in Madagascar.
