= Lecithocera caveiformis =

Scientific classification
- Domain: Eukaryota
- Kingdom: Animalia
- Phylum: Arthropoda
- Class: Insecta
- Order: Lepidoptera
- Family: Lecithoceridae
- Genus: Lecithocera
- Species: L. caveiformis

Binomial name
- Lecithocera caveiformis Meyrick, 1931

Species of moth in the genus Lecithocera

Lecithocera caveiformis is a moth in the family Lecithoceridae. It was described by Edward Meyrick in 1931. It is found in Mumbai, India.
