= T. flavescens =

T. flavescens may refer to:

- Tabebuia flavescens, a Brazilian evergreen tree
- Terebra flavescens, a sea snail
- Tetanops flavescens, a picture-winged fly
- Tetramoera flavescens, a tortrix moth
- Tetrathemis flavescens, a dragonfly first described in 1889
- Thanatus flavescens, a false crab spider
- Thereva flavescens, a stiletto fly
- Tipula flavescens, a crane fly
- Tithaeus flavescens, a Bornean harvestman
- Tithorea flavescens, a milkweed butterfly
- Titiotus flavescens, a tengellid spider
- Torodora flavescens, a long-horned moth
- Trichophyton flavescens, a sac fungus
- Trisetum flavescens, a true grass
- Tubercularia flavescens, a sac fungus
- Turbonilla flavescens, a sea snail
- Turuptiana flavescens, a South American moth
- Tytthus flavescens, a carnivorous insect
