= Torodora pegasana =

Scientific classification
- Kingdom: Animalia
- Phylum: Arthropoda
- Clade: Pancrustacea
- Class: Insecta
- Order: Lepidoptera
- Family: Lecithoceridae
- Genus: Torodora
- Species: T. pegasana

Binomial name
- Torodora pegasana C.S. Wu & Y.Q. Liu, 1994

Species of moth

Torodora pegasana is a moth in the family Lecithoceridae. It was described by Chun-Sheng Wu and You-Qiao Liu in 1994. It is found in China (Hainan), Vietnam and Thailand.

The wingspan is about 19 mm. Adults are similar to Torodora aenoptera and Torodora capillaris.
