= T. occidentalis =

T. occidentalis may refer to several different species. The specific epithet occidentalis means 'western.'

- Talpa occidentalis, the Spanish mole
- Telfairia occidentalis, a vine known as fluted gourd, fluted pumpkin, ugu, or ikong-ubong
- Thespesius occidentalis, a dinosaur in the genus Thespesius
- Thuja occidentalis, a tree known as northern white-cedar or eastern arborvitae
- Titanites occidentalis, an ammonite in the genus Titanites
- Torodora occidentalis, a moth in the family Lecithoceridae
- Tradescantia occidentalis, a plant called the western spiderwort or prairie spiderwort
- Triantha occidentalis, a carnivorous plant
- Trichromia occidentalis, a moth in the family Erebidae
- Trimeresurus occidentalis, a synonym for Craspedocephalus gramineus, the bamboo pit viper
- Triodopsis occidentalis, the western three-toothed land snail
- Turpinia occidentalis, a tree known as muttonwood

== See also ==
- Taenaris cyclops occidentalis, a subspecies of the butterfly Taenaris cyclops
- Thymelicus sylvatica occidentalis, a subspecies of the moth Thymelicus sylvatica
- Tilia caroliniana subsp. occidentalis, a subspecies of the tree Tilia caroliniana
