= Tetanops psammophila =

Scientific classification
- Kingdom: Animalia
- Phylum: Arthropoda
- Class: Insecta
- Order: Diptera
- Family: Ulidiidae
- Genus: Tetanops
- Species: T. psammophila

Binomial name
- Tetanops psammophila Loew, 1862

Species of fly

Tetanops psammophila is a species of picture-winged fly in the genus Tetanops of the family Ulidiidae. It has sometimes been considered a subspecies of T. flavescens.
