= Carodista liui =

Scientific classification
- Kingdom: Animalia
- Phylum: Arthropoda
- Clade: Pancrustacea
- Class: Insecta
- Order: Lepidoptera
- Family: Lecithoceridae
- Genus: Carodista
- Species: C. liui

Binomial name
- Carodista liui Wu, 2002

Species of moth

Carodista liui is a moth in the family Lecithoceridae. It was described by Chun-Sheng Wu in 2002. It is found in Beijing, China.

The species is related to Carodista gracilis, but can be distinguished by the male genitalia.
