= Torodora parallactis =

Scientific classification
- Kingdom: Animalia
- Phylum: Arthropoda
- Class: Insecta
- Order: Lepidoptera
- Family: Lecithoceridae
- Genus: Torodora
- Species: T. parallactis

Binomial name
- Torodora parallactis Meyrick, 1894

Species of moth

Torodora parallactis is a moth in the family Lecithoceridae. It was described by Edward Meyrick in 1894. It is found in Burma.

The wingspan is about 24 mm (0.94 in). Adults are similar to Torodora characteris, but the anterior blotch is triangular, more distinctly connected with the inner margin, followed by some whitish-ochreous scales, the posterior spot absent, replaced by two transversely placed whitish-ochreous dots. The hindwings are paler.
