= Torodora chiangdoica =

Scientific classification
- Kingdom: Animalia
- Phylum: Arthropoda
- Clade: Pancrustacea
- Class: Insecta
- Order: Lepidoptera
- Family: Lecithoceridae
- Genus: Torodora
- Species: T. chiangdoica

Binomial name
- Torodora chiangdoica Park, 2002

Species of moth

Torodora chiangdoica is a moth in the family Lecithoceridae. It was described by Kyu-Tek Park in 2002. It is found in Thailand.

The wingspan is 13–14 mm. The forewings are similar to those of Torodora moriyasu, but narrower.

== Etymology ==
The species name is derived from Chiang Mai, the type locality.
