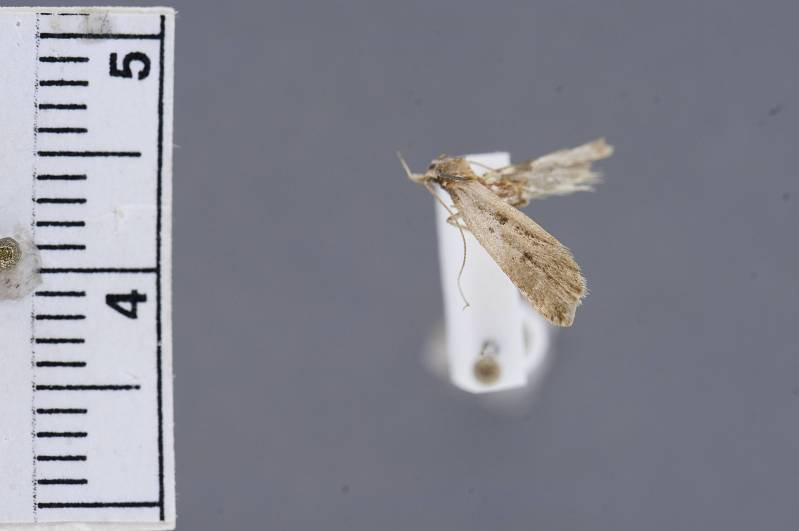

Scientific classification
- Kingdom: Animalia
- Phylum: Arthropoda
- Class: Insecta
- Order: Lepidoptera
- Family: Lecithoceridae
- Genus: Carodista; Meyrick, 1925

Synonyms
- Catacreagra Gozmány, 1978

= Carodista =

Genus of moths

Carodista is a genus of moths in the family Lecithoceridae. The genus was erected by Edward Meyrick in 1925.

== Species ==
- Carodista afghana Gozmány, 1978
- Carodista bathroptila (Meyrick, 1929)
- Carodista citrostrota (Meyrick, 1911)
- Carodista cultrata Park, 1999
- Carodista epigompha (Meyrick, 1910)
- Carodista fabajuxta C. S. Wu & Park, 1999
- Carodista flagitiosa (Meyrick, 1914)
- Carodista flavicana C. S. Wu, 2003
- Carodista fushanensis Park, 2000
- Carodista galeodes (Meyrick, 1910)
- Carodista geraea (Meyrick, 1911)
- Carodista gracilis (Gozmány, 1978)
- Carodista grypotatos Park, 2001
- Carodista isomila (Meyrick, 1911)
- Carodista liui Wu, 2002
- Carodista lycopis (Meyrick, 1911)
- Carodista melicrata (Meyrick, 1910)
- Carodista montana Park, 1999
- Carodista niphomitra (Meyrick, 1931)
- Carodista notolychna (Meyrick, 1936)
- Carodista nubigena (Meyrick, 1911)
- Carodista paroristis (Meyrick, 1911)
- Carodista tribrachia Park, 2001
- Carodista trichopla (Meyrick, 1929)
- Carodista wilpattuae Park, 2001
