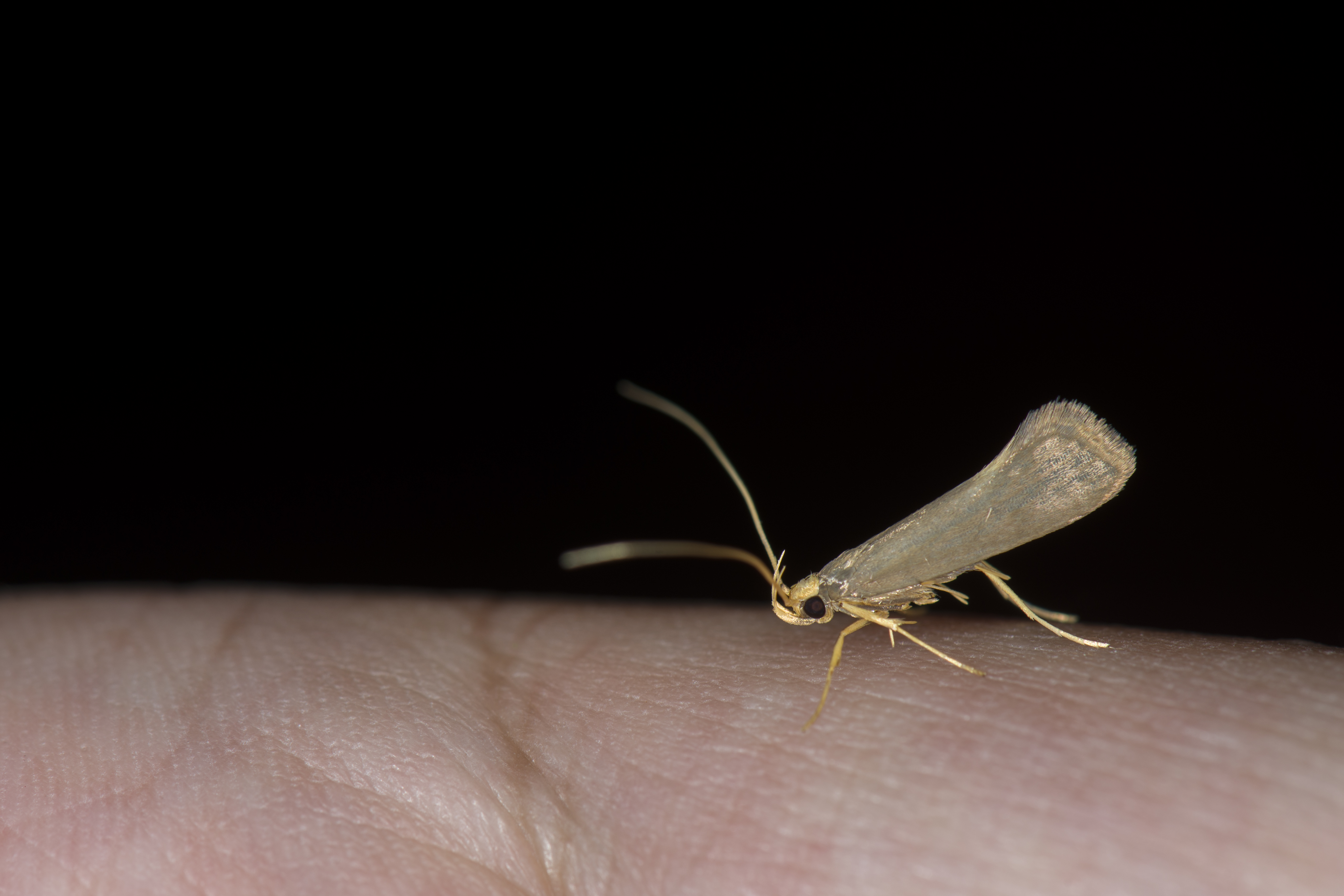

Scientific classification
- Kingdom: Animalia
- Phylum: Arthropoda
- Clade: Pancrustacea
- Class: Insecta
- Order: Lepidoptera
- Family: Lecithoceridae
- Subfamily: Torodorinae
- Genus: Torodora; Meyrick, 1894

Synonyms
- Habrogenes Meyrick, 1918; Panplatyceros Diakonoff, 1952; Toxotarca C. S. Wu, 1994

= Torodora =

Genus of moths

Torodora is a genus of moths in the family Lecithoceridae. The genus was erected by Edward Meyrick in 1894.

== Distribution and diversity ==
Torodora is an oriental genus and comprises more than 100 species.

== Species ==
- Torodora activata (Diakonoff, 1967)
- Torodora aenoptera Gozmány, 1978
- Torodora albicruris Park & Heppner, 2000
- Torodora angustia Park, 2007
- Torodora antisema (Meyrick, 1938)
- Torodora arcifera (Meyrick, 1907)
- Torodora argenteola Park, 2008
- Torodora aritai Park, 2002
- Torodora argocrossa (Meyrick, 1911)
- Torodora artiasta (Meyrick, 1911)
- Torodora babeana Park, 2007
- Torodora bachmaensis Park, 2006
- Torodora bacillaris Wang and Xiong, 2010
- Torodora biovalata Wadhawan & Walia, 2007
- Torodora bracculata (Meyrick, 1911)
- Torodora caligula (Meyrick, 1918)
- Torodora calligata Park, 2008
- Torodora calliginalis Park, 2010
- Torodora calligrapha Gozmány, 1978
- Torodora cambodiana Park, 2013
- Torodora candida Park, 2008
- Torodora capillaris Park & Heppner, 2000
- Torodora carcerata (Meyrick, 1923)
- Torodora castanea Park, 2008
- Torodora cavecostalis Park, 2008
- Torodora characteris Meyrick, 1894
- Torodora chatolensis Park, 2008
- Torodora chiangdoica Park, 2002
- Torodora chinanensis Park, 2003
- Torodora chlorobapta (Meyrick, 1931)
- Torodora chumphonica Park, 2002
- Torodora claustrata (Meyrick, 1910)
- Torodora convexa Gozmány, 1973
- Torodora corsota (Meyrick, 1911)
- Torodora crassidigitata H. H. Li, 2010
- Torodora defracta Gozmány, 1973
- Torodora deltospila (Meyrick, 1911)
- Torodora dentijuxta Gozmány, 1978
- Torodora diakonoffi Gozmány, 1978
- Torodora digna (Meyrick, 1918)
- Torodora dinosigna Gozmány, 1973
- Torodora epicharis Park, 2002
- Torodora epiphorana Park, 2002
- Torodora epitriona Park, 2002
- Torodora eupatris (Meyrick, 1910)
- Torodora facula Wu & Park, 1999
- Torodora flavescens (Gozmány, 1998) (Sichuan, China)
- Torodora forsteri Gozmány, 1973
- Torodora fortis (Meyrick, 1918)
- Torodora frustans (Diakonoff, 1952)
- Torodora fuscobasalis Park, 2002
- Torodora fuscoptera Rose & Pathania, 2003
- Torodora galera Wu & Liu, 1994
- Torodora glyptosema (Meyrick, 1938)
- Torodora granata Wu & Liu, 1994
- Torodora hemiodes Park, 2010
- Torodora hepatisma Gozmány, 1978
- Torodora hoenei Gozmány, 1978
- Torodora hybrista (Meyrick, 1922)
- Torodora invariella (Walker, 1864)
- Torodora kambanella (Viette, 1986) (Madagascar)
- Torodora karismata Park, 2010
- Torodora karsholti Park, 2002
- Torodora lativalata Park, 2008
- Torodora lechridia Park, 2008
- Torodora leucochlora (Meyrick, 1910)
- Torodora lineata Park, 2002
- Torodora loeica Park, 2002
- Torodora longilobella Park, 2002
- Torodora macrosigna Gozmány, 1973
- Torodora manoconta Wu & Liu, 1994
- Torodora masoalella (Viette, 1955) (Madagascar)
- Torodora metasaris (Meyrick, 1911)
- Torodora meifengensis Park, Heppner & Bae, 2014
- Torodora meyi Park, 2008
- Torodora moerens Gozmány, 2002
- Torodora moriyasu Park, 2002
- Torodora nabiella Park, 2006
- Torodora namalis Park, 2008
- Torodora neodeltospila Rose & Pathania, 2003
- Torodora niphadodes Park & Lee, 2012
- Torodora niphotricha (Diakonoff, 1967)
- Torodora notacma C. S. Wu, 1997
- Torodora nyctiphron (Meyrick, 1931)
- Torodora occidentalis Park, 2013
- Torodora ochrocapna (Meyrick, 1923)
- Torodora octavana (Meyrick, 1911)
- Torodora octosperma (Diakonoff, 1952)
- Torodora opportuna Meyrick, 1923 (Assam)
- Torodora orbata (Meyrick, 1910)
- Torodora orocola Gozmány, 1973
- Torodora osamensis Park, 2013
- Torodora oxalea (Meyrick, 1910)
- Torodora oxygonata Park, 2010
- Torodora parafuscoptera Rose & Pathania, 2003
- Torodora parakarismata Park & Lee, 2012
- Torodora parallactis Meyrick, 1894
- Torodora parallella Gozmány, 1978
- Torodora parasciadosa Park, Heppner & Bae, 2014
- Torodora parasema (Meyrick, 1913)
- Torodora parotidosa (C. S. Wu, 1994)
- Torodora parthenopis (Meyrick, 1932)
- Torodora parvifoliae Park, 2008
- Torodora pediformis Park, 2008
- Torodora pegasana C. S. Wu & Y. Q. Liu, 1994
- Torodora pellax (Meyrick, 1911)
- Torodora pentagona Park, 2002
- Torodora phamae Park, 2006
- Torodora phoberobis (Meyrick, 1938)
- Torodora phuruaensis Park, 2007
- Torodora pinigisanica Park, 2008
- Torodora piscarifurca Wu & Park, 1999
- Torodora ponomarenkoae Rose & Pathania, 2003
- Torodora protrocha (Meyrick, 1916)
- Torodora pseudogalera Park, 2004
- Torodora pubesensovalvata Rose & Pathania, 2003
- Torodora quadrangulata Wadhawan & Walia, 2007
- Torodora rectangulata Wadhawan & Walia, 2007
- Torodora rectilinea Park, 2003
- Torodora rectivalvata Park, 2007
- Torodora recurvata (Meyrick, 1923)
- Torodora retardata Gozmány, 1973
- Torodora rhamphasta Gozmány, 1978
- Torodora roesleri Gozmány, 1978
- Torodora sabahana Park & Lee, 2012
- Torodora sagmaria Park, 2002
- Torodora sciadosa Wu & Liu, 1994
- Torodora serpentina (Diakonoff, 1951)
- Torodora silvatica Park, 2007
- Torodora sirtalis Wu, 1997
- Torodora sortilega (Meyrick, 1911)
- Torodora spilotella (Walker, 1864)
- Torodora spinula Park, 2002
- Torodora straminala Gozmány, 2002
- Torodora strophopa (Meyrick, 1923)
- Torodora styloidea H. Wang and M. Wang, 2010
- Torodora sympelax Gozmány, 1978
- Torodora syrphetodes (Meyrick, 1906)
- Torodora tenebrata Gozmány, 1978
- Torodora thraneuta (Meyrick, 1911)
- Torodora torrifacta Gozmány, 1978
- Torodora trigona Gozmány, 1978
- Torodora typhlopis (Meyrick, 1911)
- Torodora uringensis Park, 2008
- Torodora ventralilata Wu & Park, 1999
- Torodora vietnamensis Park, 2007
- Torodora virginopis Gozmány, 1978
- Torodora wauensis Park, 2010
- Torodora youwon Park, 2010

== Former species ==
- Torodora isomila (Meyrick, 1911)
- Torodora ortilege (Meyrick, 1911)
