= Torodora parasciadosa =

Scientific classification
- Kingdom: Animalia
- Phylum: Arthropoda
- Clade: Pancrustacea
- Class: Insecta
- Order: Lepidoptera
- Family: Lecithoceridae
- Genus: Torodora
- Species: T. parasciadosa

Binomial name
- Torodora parasciadosa Park, Heppner & Bae, 2014

Species of moth

Torodora parasciadosa is a moth in the family Lecithoceridae. It was described by Kyu-Tek Park, John B. Heppner and Yang-Seop Bae in 2014. It is found in Taiwan.
