= Carodista notolychna =

Scientific classification
- Kingdom: Animalia
- Phylum: Arthropoda
- Class: Insecta
- Order: Lepidoptera
- Family: Lecithoceridae
- Genus: Carodista
- Species: C. notolychna

Binomial name
- Carodista notolychna (Meyrick, 1936)

Synonyms
- Homaloxestis notolychna Meyrick, 1936; Catacreagra notolychna

Species of moth

Carodista notolychna is a moth in the family Lecithoceridae. It is found in Taiwan and Japan.

The wingspan is 12–18 mm. The species is variable in size.
