= Heteralcis =

Scientific classification
- Kingdom: Animalia
- Phylum: Arthropoda
- Class: Insecta
- Order: Lepidoptera
- Family: Lecithoceridae
- Subfamily: Lecithocerinae
- Genus: Heteralcis; Meyrick, 1925

Synonyms
- Alciphanes Meyrick, 1925

Genus of moths

Heteralcis is a genus of moths in the family Lecithoceridae. The genus was erected by Edward Meyrick in 1925.

== Species ==
- Heteralcis bathroptila (Meyrick, 1929)
- Heteralcis clavata (Park, 2001)
- Heteralcis holocona (Meyrick, 1908)
- Heteralcis isochra (Meyrick, 1908)
- Heteralcis molybdantha (Meyrick, 1908)
- Heteralcis palathodes (Meyrick, 1906)
- Heteralcis platycapna (Meyrick, 1916)
- Heteralcis rhizophora (Meyrick, 1919)
- Heteralcis tetraclina (Meyrick, 1906)
