= Torodora caligula =

Scientific classification
- Kingdom: Animalia
- Phylum: Arthropoda
- Class: Insecta
- Order: Lepidoptera
- Family: Lecithoceridae
- Genus: Torodora
- Species: T. caligula

Binomial name
- Torodora caligula (Meyrick, 1918)

Synonyms
- Lecithocera caligula Meyrick, 1918

Species of moth

Torodora caligula is a moth in the family Lecithoceridae. It was described by Edward Meyrick in 1918. It is found on Tagula Island in New Guinea.

The wingspan is 15–16 mm. The forewings are fuscous, faintly tinged lilac and with a small flattened-triangular whitish spot on the costa at three-fourths, where a slightly curved fine indented whitish line (sometimes almost obsolete) runs to the dorsum before the tornus. The hindwings are grey, in males with a long whitish-yellowish hair-pencil from the base lying along the costa. The costal edge of the wing is dark fuscous towards the middle.
