= Carodista tribrachia =

Scientific classification
- Domain: Eukaryota
- Kingdom: Animalia
- Phylum: Arthropoda
- Class: Insecta
- Order: Lepidoptera
- Family: Lecithoceridae
- Genus: Carodista
- Species: C. tribrachia

Binomial name
- Carodista tribrachia Park, 2001

Species of moth

Carodista tribrachia is a moth in the family Lecithoceridae. It is found in Sri Lanka.

The wingspan is 21–22 mm.
