= Torodora parotidosa =

Scientific classification
- Kingdom: Animalia
- Phylum: Arthropoda
- Clade: Pancrustacea
- Class: Insecta
- Order: Lepidoptera
- Family: Lecithoceridae
- Genus: Torodora
- Species: T. parotidosa

Binomial name
- Torodora parotidosa (C.S. Wu, 1994)

Synonyms
- Toxotarca parotidosa Wu, 1994

Species of moth

Torodora parotidosa is a moth in the family Lecithoceridae. It was described by Chun-Sheng Wu in 1994. It is found in China (Guangdong) and Thailand.

The wingspan is about 19 mm.
