= Torodora crassidigitata =

Scientific classification
- Kingdom: Animalia
- Phylum: Arthropoda
- Clade: Pancrustacea
- Class: Insecta
- Order: Lepidoptera
- Family: Lecithoceridae
- Genus: Torodora
- Species: T. crassidigitata

Binomial name
- Torodora crassidigitata H.H. Li, 2010

Species of moth

Torodora crassidigitata is a moth in the family Lecithoceridae. It was described by Hou-Hun Li in 2010. It is found in Yunnan, China.

The wingspan is 18-20.5 mm.

== Etymology ==
The species name refers to the stout digitate caudal process of the juxta in the male genitalia and is derived from the Latin prefix crass (meaning thick) and Latin digitatus (meaning finger like).
