= Torodora lechridia =

Scientific classification
- Kingdom: Animalia
- Phylum: Arthropoda
- Clade: Pancrustacea
- Class: Insecta
- Order: Lepidoptera
- Family: Lecithoceridae
- Genus: Torodora
- Species: T. lechridia

Binomial name
- Torodora lechridia Park, 2008

Species of moth

Torodora lechridia is a moth in the family Lecithoceridae. It was described by Kyu-Tek Park in 2008. It is found in Palawan in the Philippines.
