= Torodora tenebrata =

Scientific classification
- Kingdom: Animalia
- Phylum: Arthropoda
- Clade: Pancrustacea
- Class: Insecta
- Order: Lepidoptera
- Family: Lecithoceridae
- Genus: Torodora
- Species: T. tenebrata

Binomial name
- Torodora tenebrata Gozmány, 1978

Species of moth

Torodora tenebrata is a moth in the family Lecithoceridae. It was described by László Anthony Gozmány in 1978. It is found in China.
