= Torodora oxalea =

Scientific classification
- Kingdom: Animalia
- Phylum: Arthropoda
- Class: Insecta
- Order: Lepidoptera
- Family: Lecithoceridae
- Genus: Torodora
- Species: T. oxalea

Binomial name
- Torodora oxalea (Meyrick, 1910)

Synonyms
- Lecithocera oxalea Meyrick, 1910

Species of moth

Torodora oxalea is a moth in the family Lecithoceridae. It was described by Edward Meyrick in 1910. It is found in southern India.

The wingspan is about 16 mm. The forewings are brownish ochreous with a small blackish spot on the base of the costa and a triangular dark fuscous blotch extending along the anterior half of the dorsum, its apical half black, the apex formed by the first discal stigma. The second discal stigma is represented by a transverse-oblong black spot and there is a nearly straight pale subterminal line indicated by a strong blackish anterior margin, broadly suffused anteriorly with fuscous, which extends on lower half to the dorsal blotch. There is also some slight fuscous suffusion towards the termen, and a rather dark fuscous cloudy terminal line. The hindwings are pale fuscous.
