= Torodora metasaris =

Scientific classification
- Kingdom: Animalia
- Phylum: Arthropoda
- Class: Insecta
- Order: Lepidoptera
- Family: Lecithoceridae
- Genus: Torodora
- Species: T. metasaris

Binomial name
- Torodora metasaris (Meyrick, 1911)

Synonyms
- Brachmia metasaris Meyrick, 1911

Species of moth

Torodora metasaris is a moth in the family Lecithoceridae. It was described by Edward Meyrick in 1911. It is found in Assam, India.

The wingspan is 17–18 mm. The forewings are rather dark fuscous, faintly purplish tinged with an ochreous-whitish dot on the costa at three-fourths and a dark fuscous terminal line. The hindwings are fuscous.
