= Torodora typhlopis =

Scientific classification
- Kingdom: Animalia
- Phylum: Arthropoda
- Clade: Pancrustacea
- Class: Insecta
- Order: Lepidoptera
- Family: Lecithoceridae
- Genus: Torodora
- Species: T. typhlopis

Binomial name
- Torodora typhlopis (Meyrick, 1911)

Synonyms
- Brachmia typhlopis Meyrick, 1911

Species of moth

Torodora typhlopis is a moth in the family Lecithoceridae. It was described by Edward Meyrick in 1911. It is found in southern India.

The wingspan is 22–30 mm (0.87–1.18 in). The forewings are glossy dark purplish fuscous. The stigmata are represented by black spots, the first discal small, round and confluent with a large trapezoidal plical beneath it, the second discal moderate and transverse. The hindwings are fuscous, in females rather darker.
