= Torodora parafuscoptera =

Scientific classification
- Domain: Eukaryota
- Kingdom: Animalia
- Phylum: Arthropoda
- Class: Insecta
- Order: Lepidoptera
- Family: Lecithoceridae
- Genus: Torodora
- Species: T. parafuscoptera

Binomial name
- Torodora parafuscoptera Rose & Pathania, 2003

Species of moth

Torodora parafuscoptera is a moth in the family Lecithoceridae. It was described by H.S. Rose and Prakesh C. Pathania in 2003. It is found in north-western India.
