= Torodora bachmaensis =

Scientific classification
- Kingdom: Animalia
- Phylum: Arthropoda
- Clade: Pancrustacea
- Class: Insecta
- Order: Lepidoptera
- Family: Lecithoceridae
- Genus: Torodora
- Species: T. bachmaensis

Binomial name
- Torodora bachmaensis Park, 2006

Species of moth

Torodora bachmaensis is a moth in the family Lecithoceridae. It was described by Kyu-Tek Park in 2006. It is found in Vietnam.
