= Tetanops integer =

Scientific classification
- Kingdom: Animalia
- Phylum: Arthropoda
- Class: Insecta
- Order: Diptera
- Family: Ulidiidae
- Genus: Tetanops
- Species: T. integer

Binomial name
- Tetanops integer Loew, 1873

Species of fly

Tetanops integer is a species of ulidiid or picture-winged fly in the genus Tetanops of the family Tephritidae.
