= Heteralcis molybdantha =

Scientific classification
- Domain: Eukaryota
- Kingdom: Animalia
- Phylum: Arthropoda
- Class: Insecta
- Order: Lepidoptera
- Family: Lecithoceridae
- Genus: Heteralcis
- Species: H. molybdantha

Binomial name
- Heteralcis molybdantha (Meyrick, 1908)

Synonyms
- Timyra molybdantha Meyrick, 1908

Species of moth

Heteralcis molybdantha is a moth in the family Lecithoceridae. It was described by Edward Meyrick in 1908. It is found in Sri Lanka.

The wingspan is about 14 mm. The forewings are dark fuscous sprinkled with black, with scattered ochreous hair-scales and thick bluish-leaden-metallic subcostal and narrower submedian streaks from the base to one-third, as well as an almost straight double antemedian fascia, the first half narrow, yellow ochreous, edged posteriorly with dark fuscous, the second half broader, bright bluish leaden metallic. Some irregular leaden-metallic spots are found in the disc about three-fourths and around the posterior third of the costa and termen, around the apex confluent into a streak. The hindwings are dark fuscous with a short subdorsal groove from the base, containing an expansible pencil of whitish ochreous hairs.
