= Torodora albicruris =

Scientific classification
- Kingdom: Animalia
- Phylum: Arthropoda
- Clade: Pancrustacea
- Class: Insecta
- Order: Lepidoptera
- Family: Lecithoceridae
- Genus: Torodora
- Species: T. albicruris

Binomial name
- Torodora albicruris Park & Heppner, 2000

Species of moth

Torodora albicruris is a moth in the family Lecithoceridae. It is found in Taiwan.

The wingspan is 12 mm.
