= Heteralcis isochra =

Scientific classification
- Kingdom: Animalia
- Phylum: Arthropoda
- Class: Insecta
- Order: Lepidoptera
- Family: Lecithoceridae
- Genus: Heteralcis
- Species: H. isochra

Binomial name
- Heteralcis isochra (Meyrick, 1908)

Synonyms
- Timyra isochra Meyrick, 1908

Species of moth

Heteralcis isochra is a moth in the family Lecithoceridae. It was described by Edward Meyrick in 1908. It is found in Assam, India. and Sri Lanka.

The wingspan is 12–14 mm. The forewings exhibit a light ochreous yellow color, adorned with four somewhat oblique, broad, and undefined fasciae that are darker, with a deeper ochreous or brownish suffusion. The first fascia is sometimes notably dark fuscous, while the second is the narrowest. The hindwings are also light ochreous yellow and feature a subdorsal groove that encloses a long pencil of ochreous-yellowish hairs.
