= Heteralcis tetraclina =

Scientific classification
- Domain: Eukaryota
- Kingdom: Animalia
- Phylum: Arthropoda
- Class: Insecta
- Order: Lepidoptera
- Family: Lecithoceridae
- Genus: Heteralcis
- Species: H. tetraclina

Binomial name
- Heteralcis tetraclina (Meyrick, 1906)

Synonyms
- Timyra tetraclina Meyrick, 1906

Species of moth

Heteralcis tetraclina is a moth in the family Lecithoceridae. It was described by Edward Meyrick in 1906. It is found in Sri Lanka.

The wingspan is 16–18 mm. The forewings are yellowish orange with fuscous-purple markings. There is a small spot on the base of the costa and five narrow transverse fasciae, the first at one-sixth, rather inwardly oblique, the second at one-third, rather outwardly oblique, the third median, oblique, irregularly angulated or dilated, the fourth at three-fourths, irregular, the fifth terminal, meeting the fourth at the tornus. There is also a small discal spot beyond the third, sometimes connected with it. The hindwings are whitish ochreous in males, with the posterior third suffused with dark fuscous, with a deep groove along the fold containing a very long expansible whitish-ochreous hair-pencil. The hindwings of the females are grey.
