= Carodista paroristis =

Scientific classification
- Kingdom: Animalia
- Phylum: Arthropoda
- Class: Insecta
- Order: Lepidoptera
- Family: Lecithoceridae
- Genus: Carodista
- Species: C. paroristis

Binomial name
- Carodista paroristis (Meyrick, 1911)

Synonyms
- Brachmia paroristis Meyrick, 1911; Lecithocera paroristis (Meyrick, 1911)

Species of moth

Carodista paroristis is a moth in the family Lecithoceridae. It was described by Edward Meyrick in 1911. It is found in Sri Lanka.

The wingspan is 24–25 mm. The forewings are dark fuscous, faintly purplish tinged, towards the middle third of the costa more or less suffused with pale ochreous fuscous. The stigmata are blackish, the first discal forming a small oblique spot, the plical a larger irregular spot beneath it, both these more or less edged posteriorly with pale ochreous, the second discal represented by two transversely placed dots edged with pale ochreous so as to form an 8-shaped mark. There is also a cloudy pale ochreous-fuscous rather curved subterminal line, thicker and more distinct on the costa, indented beneath the costa. The hindwings are fuscous grey.
