= Torodora eupatris =

Scientific classification
- Kingdom: Animalia
- Phylum: Arthropoda
- Class: Insecta
- Order: Lepidoptera
- Family: Lecithoceridae
- Genus: Torodora
- Species: T. eupatris

Binomial name
- Torodora eupatris (Meyrick, 1910)

Synonyms
- Lecithocera eupatris Meyrick, 1910

Species of moth

Torodora eupatris is a moth in the family Lecithoceridae. It was described by Edward Meyrick in 1910. It is found in Assam, India.

The wingspan is 18–19 mm. The forewings are bright yellow ochreous with an ill-defined transverse white line near the base and a sinuate white transverse line somewhat before the middle. The space between these two lines is occupied, except towards the costa, by a suffused blackish blotch, more or less sprinkled posteriorly with blue whitish. There are three white marks on the posterior half of the costa, sometimes confluent, as well as a crescentic white mark in the disc beyond the middle. A blotch of dark fuscous suffusion extends over the dorsal half of the wing from the antemedian line to near the termen. The hindwings are light grey, becoming pale ochreous yellowish towards the apex.
