= Torodora rectangulata =

Scientific classification
- Domain: Eukaryota
- Kingdom: Animalia
- Phylum: Arthropoda
- Class: Insecta
- Order: Lepidoptera
- Family: Lecithoceridae
- Genus: Torodora
- Species: T. rectangulata

Binomial name
- Torodora rectangulata Wadhawan & Walia, 2007

Species of moth

Torodora rectangulata is a moth in the family Lecithoceridae. It was described by Deepak Wadhawan and Virinder Kumar Walia in 2007. It is found in the Southern regions of India.

The wingspan is 16–17 mm for males and about 17 mm for females. Adults have been recorded on wing in June, August and September.

== Etymology ==
The specific name refers to the characteristically rectangular shape of the signum in the corpus bursae of the female genitalia.
