= Torodora activata =

Scientific classification
- Domain: Eukaryota
- Kingdom: Animalia
- Phylum: Arthropoda
- Class: Insecta
- Order: Lepidoptera
- Family: Lecithoceridae
- Genus: Torodora
- Species: T. activata

Binomial name
- Torodora activata (Diakonoff, 1967)

Synonyms
- Lecithocera activata Diakonoff, [1968]

Species of moth

Torodora activata is a moth in the family Lecithoceridae. It was described by Alexey Diakonoff in 1967. It is found on Luzon in the Philippines.

The wingspan is about 16 mm. The forewings are evenly deep fuscous with a purplish hue. There is a small wedge-shaped oblique transverse mark before four-fifths on the costa, continued across the wing by a minute and faint pale line, inwards-angulate below the costa, broadly outwards-convex in the middle, sinuate above the dorsum, to the dorsum before the tornus. The stigmata are rounded and vague, a little darker than the ground color, the first discal at one-third, the plical slightly larger, beyond this. The second discal is represented by a narrow dark strigula along the closing vein and there is a minute pale spot in the apex. The hindwings are fuscous bronze.
