= Torodora strophopa =

Scientific classification
- Kingdom: Animalia
- Phylum: Arthropoda
- Clade: Pancrustacea
- Class: Insecta
- Order: Lepidoptera
- Family: Lecithoceridae
- Genus: Torodora
- Species: T. strophopa

Binomial name
- Torodora strophopa (Meyrick, 1923)

Synonyms
- Brachmia strophopa Meyrick, 1923

Species of moth

Torodora strophopa is a moth in the family Lecithoceridae. It was described by Edward Meyrick in 1923. It is found in southern India.

The wingspan is about 21 mm. The forewings are rather dark bronzy fuscous. The stigmata are black, the first discal moderate, others large, the plical obliquely beyond the first discal, the second discal transverse. There is a hardly perceptible lighter subterminal shade angulated outwards in the middle and inwards near the costa, on the costa pale ochreous. The hindwings are light grey.
