= Torodora artiasta =

Scientific classification
- Kingdom: Animalia
- Phylum: Arthropoda
- Class: Insecta
- Order: Lepidoptera
- Family: Lecithoceridae
- Genus: Torodora
- Species: T. artiasta

Binomial name
- Torodora artiasta (Meyrick, 1911)

Synonyms
- Brachmia artiasta Meyrick, 1911

Species of moth

Torodora artiasta is a moth in the family Lecithoceridae. It was described by Edward Meyrick in 1911. It is found in southern India.

The wingspan is about 22 mm. The forewings are rather dark purplish fuscous. The stigmata are blackish, the plical beneath the first discal. The hindwings are grey.
