= Torodora ponomarenkoae =

Scientific classification
- Kingdom: Animalia
- Phylum: Arthropoda
- Clade: Pancrustacea
- Class: Insecta
- Order: Lepidoptera
- Family: Lecithoceridae
- Genus: Torodora
- Species: T. ponomarenkoae

Binomial name
- Torodora ponomarenkoae Rose & Pathania, 2003

Species of moth

Torodora ponomarenkoae is a moth in the family Lecithoceridae. It was described by H.S. Rose and Prakesh C. Pathania in 2003. It is found in Himachal Pradesh, India.
