= Torodora spinula =

Scientific classification
- Kingdom: Animalia
- Phylum: Arthropoda
- Class: Insecta
- Order: Lepidoptera
- Family: Lecithoceridae
- Genus: Torodora
- Species: T. spinula

Binomial name
- Torodora spinula Park, 2002

Species of moth

Torodora spinula is a moth in the family Lecithoceridae described by Kyu-Tek Park in 2002. It is endemic to the Thai provinces of Chiang Mai and Nakhon Nayok.

The wingspan is 13–13.5 millimetres (0.51–0.53 in).
