= Torodora arcifera =

Scientific classification
- Kingdom: Animalia
- Phylum: Arthropoda
- Class: Insecta
- Order: Lepidoptera
- Family: Lecithoceridae
- Genus: Torodora
- Species: T. arcifera

Binomial name
- Torodora arcifera (Meyrick, 1907)

Synonyms
- Brachmia arcifera Meyrick, 1907

Species of moth

Torodora arcifera is a moth in the family Lecithoceridae. It was described by Edward Meyrick in 1907. It is found in Bhutan.

The wingspan is 14–15 mm. The forewings are dark purplish-bronzy fuscous. The stigmata are blackish, the plical and first discal confluent, edged posteriorly by a slightly curved ochreous-whitish line from two-fifths of the costa to the middle of the dorsum, the second discal is obscurely edged with whitish and with an additional similar dot beneath it. There is an ochreous-whitish dot on the costa at four-fifths. The hindwings are fuscous.
