= Torodora osamensis =

Scientific classification
- Kingdom: Animalia
- Phylum: Arthropoda
- Clade: Pancrustacea
- Class: Insecta
- Order: Lepidoptera
- Family: Lecithoceridae
- Genus: Torodora
- Species: T. osamensis

Binomial name
- Torodora osamensis Park, 2013

Species of moth

Torodora osamensis is a moth in the family Lecithoceridae. It was described by Kyu-Tek Park in 2013. It is found in Cambodia.
