= Carodista nubigena =

Scientific classification
- Kingdom: Animalia
- Phylum: Arthropoda
- Class: Insecta
- Order: Lepidoptera
- Family: Lecithoceridae
- Genus: Carodista
- Species: C. nubigena

Binomial name
- Carodista nubigena (Meyrick, 1911)

Synonyms
- Brachmia nubigena Meyrick, 1911; Lecithocera nubigena (Meyrick, 1911)

Species of moth

Carodista nubigena is a moth in the family Lecithoceridae. It was described by Edward Meyrick in 1911. It is found in Sri Lanka.

The wingspan is about 17 mm. The forewings are dark purplish fuscous. The stigmata are cloudy and blackish, the plical slightly beyond the first discal. There is a small pale ochreous spot on the costa at four-fifths, and a minute dot on the dorsum before the tornus. The hindwings are light fuscous.
