= Carodista niphomitra =

Scientific classification
- Kingdom: Animalia
- Phylum: Arthropoda
- Class: Insecta
- Order: Lepidoptera
- Family: Lecithoceridae
- Genus: Carodista
- Species: C. niphomitra

Binomial name
- Carodista niphomitra (Meyrick, 1931)

Synonyms
- Catacreagra niphomitra Meyrick, 1931

Species of moth

Carodista niphomitra is a moth in the family Lecithoceridae. It is found in Sikkim, India.
