= Torodora biovalata =

Scientific classification
- Domain: Eukaryota
- Kingdom: Animalia
- Phylum: Arthropoda
- Class: Insecta
- Order: Lepidoptera
- Family: Lecithoceridae
- Genus: Torodora
- Species: T. biovalata

Binomial name
- Torodora biovalata Wadhawan & Walia, 2007

Species of moth

Torodora biovalata is a moth in the family Lecithoceridae. It was described by Deepak Wadhawan and Virinder Kumar Walia in 2007. It is found in Rajasthan, India.
