= Torodora pseudogalera =

Scientific classification
- Kingdom: Animalia
- Phylum: Arthropoda
- Class: Insecta
- Order: Lepidoptera
- Family: Lecithoceridae
- Genus: Torodora
- Species: T. pseudogalera

Binomial name
- Torodora pseudogalera Park, 2004

Species of moth

Torodora pseudogalera is a moth in the family Lecithoceridae. It is found in Taiwan. It is similar to Torodora galera from China but slightly larger and with some differences in male genitalia. Specimens have been obtained at elevations of 2,200–2,250 m (7,220–7,380 ft) above sea level.

== Description ==
The wingspan is 24–29 mm (0.94–1.14 in).
