= Torodora thraneuta =

Scientific classification
- Kingdom: Animalia
- Phylum: Arthropoda
- Class: Insecta
- Order: Lepidoptera
- Family: Lecithoceridae
- Genus: Torodora
- Species: T. thraneuta

Binomial name
- Torodora thraneuta (Meyrick, 1911)

Synonyms
- Brachmia thraneuta Meyrick, 1911

Species of moth

Torodora thraneuta is a moth in the family Lecithoceridae. It was described by Edward Meyrick in 1911. It is found in Sri Lanka.

The wingspan is 15–19 mm. The forewings are rather dark fuscous, faintly bronzy or purplish tinged and with the stigmata obscurely darker, the plical rather beyond the first discal, the second discal forming a transverse mark. There is an ochreous-whitish dot on the costa at three-fourths, where a very faint somewhat curved pale line runs to the dorsum before the tornus. There is also a blackish terminal line. The hindwings are rather dark fuscous.
