= Torodora orbata =

Scientific classification
- Kingdom: Animalia
- Phylum: Arthropoda
- Clade: Pancrustacea
- Class: Insecta
- Order: Lepidoptera
- Family: Lecithoceridae
- Genus: Torodora
- Species: T. orbata

Binomial name
- Torodora orbata (Meyrick, 1910)

Synonyms
- Brachmia orbata Meyrick, 1910

Species of moth

Torodora orbata is a moth in the family Lecithoceridae. It was described by Edward Meyrick in 1910. It is found on Borneo.

The wingspan is about 18 mm. The forewings are rather dark fuscous, slightly purplish tinged and the terminal edge is dark fuscous. The hindwings are rather dark grey.
