= Torodora phuruaensis =

Scientific classification
- Kingdom: Animalia
- Phylum: Arthropoda
- Clade: Pancrustacea
- Class: Insecta
- Order: Lepidoptera
- Family: Lecithoceridae
- Genus: Torodora
- Species: T. phuruaensis

Binomial name
- Torodora phuruaensis Park, 2007

Species of moth

Torodora phuruaensis is a moth in the family Lecithoceridae. It was described by Kyu-Tek Park in 2007. It is found in Thailand.

== Etymology ==
The species name refers to Phu Ruea in Thailand, the collecting locality of the holotype.
