= Torodora deltospila =

Scientific classification
- Kingdom: Animalia
- Phylum: Arthropoda
- Class: Insecta
- Order: Lepidoptera
- Family: Lecithoceridae
- Genus: Torodora
- Species: T. deltospila

Binomial name
- Torodora deltospila (Meyrick, 1911)

Synonyms
- Lecithocera deltospila Meyrick, 1911

Species of moth

Torodora deltospila is a moth in the family Lecithoceridae. It was described by Edward Meyrick in 1911. It is found in India in Assam, Himachal Pradesh, Dehradun and Jammu and Kashmir.

The wingspan is about 21 mm. The forewings are whitish ochreous with a blackish-fuscous streak along the basal sixth of the costa and a flattened-triangular blackish-fuscous blotch representing the plical and first discal stigmata, extending from near the base to the middle. There is an inverted-triangular blackish-fuscous blotch representing the second discal stigma and between these blotches are two fuscous spots. The dorsum is suffused with fuscous from near the base to the tornus. The posterior two-fifths of the wing are dark fuscous suffusedly irrorated with ochreous whitish, tending to form streaks on the veins, and cut by a nearly straight whitish-ochreous subterminal line parallel to the termen, slightly indented above the middle. The hindwings are light grey.
