= Carodista citrostrota =

Scientific classification
- Kingdom: Animalia
- Phylum: Arthropoda
- Class: Insecta
- Order: Lepidoptera
- Family: Lecithoceridae
- Genus: Carodista
- Species: C. citrostrota

Binomial name
- Carodista citrostrota (Meyrick, 1911)

Synonyms
- Brachmia citrostrota Meyrick, 1911

Species of moth

Carodista citrostrota is a moth in the family Lecithoceridae. It was described by Edward Meyrick in 1911. It is found in Assam, India.

The wingspan is 15–17 mm. The forewings are rather dark fuscous mixed with blackish, faintly purplish tinged and with undefined longitudinal streaks of ochreous-yellowish suffusion or irroration (sprinkles) above and below the middle, confluent posteriorly into a moderately broad irregular subterminal transverse fascia. There are five small pale yellowish spots on the posterior half of the costa and the stigmata are represented by round spots of blackish suffusion, the plical rather obliquely beyond the first discal. The hindwings are rather dark grey.
