= Torodora macrosigna =

Scientific classification
- Kingdom: Animalia
- Phylum: Arthropoda
- Clade: Pancrustacea
- Class: Insecta
- Order: Lepidoptera
- Family: Lecithoceridae
- Genus: Torodora
- Species: T. macrosigna

Binomial name
- Torodora macrosigna Gozmány, 1973

Species of moth

Torodora macrosigna is a moth belonging to the Lecithoceridae family. It was described by László Anthony Gozmány in 1973 and is said to be found in Nepal.
