= Torodora antisema =

Scientific classification
- Kingdom: Animalia
- Phylum: Arthropoda
- Class: Insecta
- Order: Lepidoptera
- Family: Lecithoceridae
- Genus: Torodora
- Species: T. antisema

Binomial name
- Torodora antisema (Meyrick, 1938)

Synonyms
- Lecithocera antisema Meyrick, 1938

Species of moth

Torodora antisema is a moth in the family Lecithoceridae. It was described by Edward Meyrick in 1938. It is found in Yunnan, China.
