= Carodista epigompha =

Scientific classification
- Kingdom: Animalia
- Phylum: Arthropoda
- Class: Insecta
- Order: Lepidoptera
- Family: Lecithoceridae
- Genus: Carodista
- Species: C. epigompha

Binomial name
- Carodista epigompha (Meyrick, 1910)

Synonyms
- Lecithocera epigompha Meyrick, 1910

Species of moth

Carodista epigompha is a moth in the family Lecithoceridae. It was described by Edward Meyrick in 1910. It is found in Sri Lanka.

The wingspan is about 20 mm. The forewings are pale brownish ochreous, suffusedly irrorated (sprinkled) with fuscous except towards the costa. The base of the costa is suffused with fuscous and there is a blackish dot beneath the costa near the base. The stigmata are represented by rather large irregular subquadrate blackish spots, the plical slightly before the first discal and almost connected with it, the second discal united with a similar spot beneath it to form a transverse spot. There is a pale somewhat curved subterminal line indicated by marginal bands of fuscous suffusion. The hindwings are grey.
