= Torodora spilotella =

Scientific classification
- Kingdom: Animalia
- Phylum: Arthropoda
- Class: Insecta
- Order: Lepidoptera
- Family: Lecithoceridae
- Genus: Torodora
- Species: T. spilotella

Binomial name
- Torodora spilotella (Walker, 1864)

Synonyms
- Cryptolechia spilotella Walker, 1864

Species of moth

Torodora spilotella is a moth in the family Lecithoceridae. It was described by Francis Walker in 1864. It is found in Sri Lanka.

Adults are brown, the wings broad, with a yellowish marginal line. The forewings are slightly rounded at the tips, with two deep black patches in the disc, the first patch near the base, larger than the second, which is transverse and beyond the middle of the wing. The exterior border is straight and hardly oblique. The hindwings are brownish cinereous.
