= Torodora corsota =

Scientific classification
- Kingdom: Animalia
- Phylum: Arthropoda
- Class: Insecta
- Order: Lepidoptera
- Family: Lecithoceridae
- Genus: Torodora
- Species: T. corsota

Binomial name
- Torodora corsota (Meyrick, 1911)

Synonyms
- Brachmia corsota Meyrick, 1911

Species of moth

Torodora corsota is a moth in the family Lecithoceridae. It was described by Edward Meyrick in 1911. It is found in Assam, India.

The wingspan is 20–22 mm. The forewings are rather dark fuscous, faintly purplish tinged with an ochreous-whitish dot on the costa at three-fourths. The hindwings are fuscous.
