= Torodora ochrocapna =

Scientific classification
- Kingdom: Animalia
- Phylum: Arthropoda
- Class: Insecta
- Order: Lepidoptera
- Family: Lecithoceridae
- Genus: Torodora
- Species: T. ochrocapna

Binomial name
- Torodora ochrocapna (Meyrick, 1923)

Synonyms
- Lecithocera ochrocapna Meyrick, 1923

Species of moth

Torodora ochrocapna is a moth in the family Lecithoceridae. It was described by Edward Meyrick in 1923. It is found on Mindanao in the Philippines.

The wingspan is about 21 mm. The forewings are ochreous fuscous with a small suffused ochreous-whitish oblique wedge-shaped mark on the costa at four-fifths. The hindwings are grey.
