= Torodora parthenopis =

Scientific classification
- Kingdom: Animalia
- Phylum: Arthropoda
- Class: Insecta
- Order: Lepidoptera
- Family: Lecithoceridae
- Genus: Torodora
- Species: T. parthenopis

Binomial name
- Torodora parthenopis (Meyrick, 1932)

Synonyms
- Lecithocera parthenopis Meyrick, 1932

Species of moth

Torodora parthenopis is a moth in the family Lecithoceridae. It is found in Taiwan and northern Vietnam.
