= Torodora epitriona =

Scientific classification
- Kingdom: Animalia
- Phylum: Arthropoda
- Class: Insecta
- Order: Lepidoptera
- Family: Lecithoceridae
- Genus: Torodora
- Species: T. epitriona

Binomial name
- Torodora epitriona Park, 2002

Species of moth

Torodora epitriona is a moth in the family Lecithoceridae first described by Kyu-Tek Park in 2002. It is endemic to Chiang Mai, Thailand.

The wingspan is 16 millimetres (0.63 in). The forewings are pale greyish orange, somewhat shiny or almost transparent, but without markings. The hindwings are pale greyish orange.

== Etymology ==
The species name refers to the needle-shaped lobes of the juxta and is derived from Greek epetrion.
