= Torodora argocrossa =

Scientific classification
- Kingdom: Animalia
- Phylum: Arthropoda
- Class: Insecta
- Order: Lepidoptera
- Family: Lecithoceridae
- Genus: Torodora
- Species: T. argocrossa

Binomial name
- Torodora argocrossa (Meyrick, 1911)

Synonyms
- Brachmia argocrossa Meyrick, 1911

Species of moth

Torodora argocrossa is a moth in the family Lecithoceridae. It was described by Edward Meyrick in 1911. It is found in Sri Lanka.

The wingspan is 16–18 mm. The forewings are purplish fuscous. The stigmata are black, the plical rather obliquely beyond the first discal. There is a whitish dot on the costa at two-thirds, where sometimes a very faint pale curved or bent line runs to the dorsum and there is a blackish terminal line. The hindwings are grey with an oblique dark grey discal mark.
