= Torodora wauensis =

Scientific classification
- Kingdom: Animalia
- Phylum: Arthropoda
- Clade: Pancrustacea
- Class: Insecta
- Order: Lepidoptera
- Family: Lecithoceridae
- Genus: Torodora
- Species: T. wauensis

Binomial name
- Torodora wauensis Park, 2010

Species of moth

Torodora wauensis is a moth in the family Lecithoceridae. It was described by Kyu-Tek Park in 2010. It is found in Papua New Guinea.
