= Torodora sortilega =

Scientific classification
- Domain: Eukaryota
- Kingdom: Animalia
- Phylum: Arthropoda
- Class: Insecta
- Order: Lepidoptera
- Family: Lecithoceridae
- Genus: Torodora
- Species: T. sortilega

Binomial name
- Torodora sortilega (Meyrick, 1911)

Synonyms
- Brachmia sortilega Meyrick, 1911; Torodora ortilege

Species of moth

Torodora sortilega is a moth in the family Lecithoceridae. It is found in the Khasi Hills of Meghalaya, India, and in Taiwan. The Taiwanese specimens were obtained at elevations of 650–760 m (2,130–2,490 ft) above sea level.

== Description ==
The wingspan is 21–23 mm. The forewings are light brownish–ochreous, somewhat sprinkled with fuscous and with the costal edge ochreous–yellowish except towards the base, where it is dark fuscous. The stigmata are blackish, the first discal well-marked, the plical obsolete, absorbed in a transverse mark of dark fuscous suffusion from the dorsum, the second discal represented by two transversely placed sometimes connected dots. There is a small spot of dark fuscous suffusion on the costa somewhat beyond the first discal and a wedge-shaped mark of blackish suffusion on the costa, where a rather pale obscure anteriorly fuscous-edged somewhat curved line runs to four-fifths of the dorsum. There is also an interrupted blackish terminal line. The hindwings are pale ochreous tinged with fuscous.
