= Torodora digna =

Scientific classification
- Kingdom: Animalia
- Phylum: Arthropoda
- Class: Insecta
- Order: Lepidoptera
- Family: Lecithoceridae
- Genus: Torodora
- Species: T. digna

Binomial name
- Torodora digna (Meyrick, 1918)

Synonyms
- Lecithocera digna Meyrick, 1918

Species of moth

Torodora digna is a moth in the family Lecithoceridae. It was described by Edward Meyrick in 1918. It is found in Assam, India.

The wingspan is about 18 mm (0.71 in). The forewings are rather dark fuscous, faintly tinged purplish and with a minute whitish dot on the costa at three-fourths, where very faint traces of a fine pale angulated transverse line proceed. The hindwings are grey.
