= Torodora manoconta =

Scientific classification
- Domain: Eukaryota
- Kingdom: Animalia
- Phylum: Arthropoda
- Class: Insecta
- Order: Lepidoptera
- Family: Lecithoceridae
- Genus: Torodora
- Species: T. manoconta

Binomial name
- Torodora manoconta Wu & Liu, 1994

Species of moth

Torodora manoconta is a species of moth in the family Lecithoceridae. It is found in Taiwan and the provinces of Jiangxi and Yunnan in China.

The wingspan is 19–22 mm.
