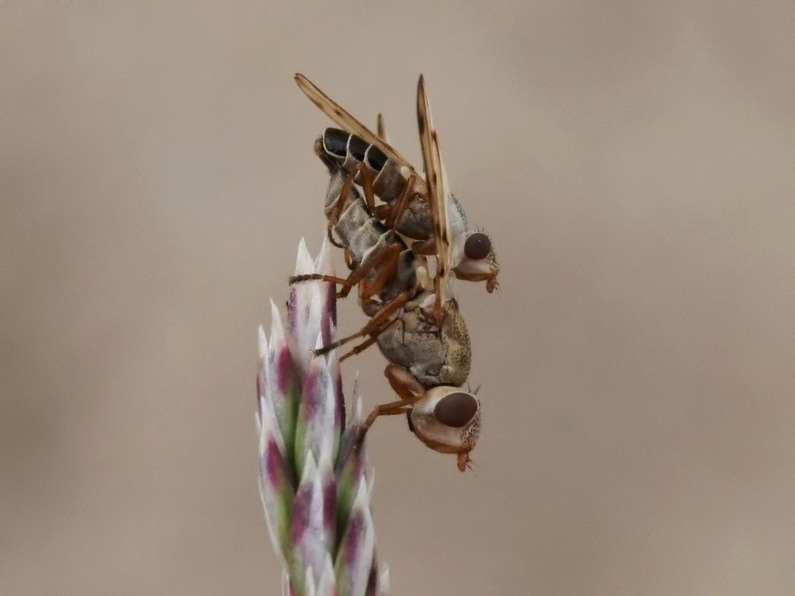
- Tetanops myopina couple

Scientific classification
- Kingdom: Animalia
- Phylum: Arthropoda
- Clade: Pancrustacea
- Class: Insecta
- Order: Diptera
- Family: Ulidiidae
- Subfamily: Otitinae
- Tribe: Otitini
- Genus: Tetanops; Fallén, 1820

Type species
- T. myopinus Fallén, 1820

Synonyms
- Eurycephala Roder, 1881; Eurycephalomyia Hendel, 1907; Terelliosoma Rondani, 1856

= Tetanops =

Genus of flies

Tetanops is a genus of picture-winged flies in the family Ulidiidae.

== Species ==
- Subgenus Eurycephalomyia Hendel, 1907

- Tetanops sintenisi Becker, 1909

- Subgenus Tetanops Fallén, 1820

- Tetanops contarinii Rondani, 1869
- Tetanops corsicana Becker, 1909
- Tetanops flavescens Macquart, 1835
- Tetanops laticeps Loew, 1868
- Tetanops myopina Fallén, 1820
- Tetanops psammophila Loew, 1862

Others:

- Tetanops apicalis
- Tetanops cazieri
- Tetanops eryngii
- Tetanops heryngii
- Tetanops impunctata
- Tetanops integer
- Tetanops luridipennis
- Tetanops magdalenae
- Tetanops myopaeformis
- Tetanops parallelus
- Tetanops rufifrons
- Tetanops vittifrons
