= Torodora claustrata =

Scientific classification
- Kingdom: Animalia
- Phylum: Arthropoda
- Class: Insecta
- Order: Lepidoptera
- Family: Lecithoceridae
- Genus: Torodora
- Species: T. claustrata

Binomial name
- Torodora claustrata (Meyrick, 1910)

Synonyms
- Lecithocera claustrata Meyrick, 1910

Species of moth

Torodora claustrata is a moth in the family Lecithoceridae. It was described by Edward Meyrick in 1910. It is found on Borneo.

The wingspan is about 19 mm. The forewings are dark glossy slaty fuscous with narrow blackish-fuscous fasciae at two-fifths and four-fifths, slightly whitish edged posteriorly. There is a transverse-oval blackish-fuscous spot in the disc at two-thirds, slightly whitish edged, containing some ochreous-yellowish scales towards the centre. The hindwings are dark fuscous.
