= Torodora sagmaria =

Scientific classification
- Kingdom: Animalia
- Phylum: Arthropoda
- Clade: Pancrustacea
- Class: Insecta
- Order: Lepidoptera
- Family: Lecithoceridae
- Genus: Torodora
- Species: T. sagmaria

Binomial name
- Torodora sagmaria Park, 2002

Species of moth

Torodora sagmaria is a moth in the family Lecithoceridae. It was described by Kyu-Tek Park in 2002. It is found in Cambodia and Thailand.

The wingspan is about 14 mm. The forewings are brownish and the hindwings are grey.

== Etymology ==
The species name refers to the shape of the 8th segment and is derived from Greek sagma (meaning pack, saddle).
