= Torodora granata =

Scientific classification
- Kingdom: Animalia
- Phylum: Arthropoda
- Clade: Pancrustacea
- Class: Insecta
- Order: Lepidoptera
- Family: Lecithoceridae
- Genus: Torodora
- Species: T. granata

Binomial name
- Torodora granata Wu & Liu, 1994

Species of moth

Torodora granata is a moth in the family Lecithoceridae. It was described by Chun-Sheng Wu and You-Qiao Liu in 1994. It is found in China (Hainan) and Vietnam.
