= Torodora protrocha =

Scientific classification
- Kingdom: Animalia
- Phylum: Arthropoda
- Class: Insecta
- Order: Lepidoptera
- Family: Lecithoceridae
- Genus: Torodora
- Species: T. protrocha

Binomial name
- Torodora protrocha (Meyrick, 1916)

Synonyms
- Brachmia protrocha Meyrick, 1916

Species of moth

Torodora protrocha is a moth in the family Lecithoceridae. It was described by Edward Meyrick in 1916. It is found in southern India.

The wingspan is about 22 mm. The forewings are light brownish ochreous, suffusedly sprinkled with fuscous and dark fuscous, the discal area beyond the cell broadly clouded with fuscous. The stigmata are large, cloudy and blackish, the plical obliquely before the first discal. The hindwings are pale grey.
