= Torodora bracculata =

Scientific classification
- Kingdom: Animalia
- Phylum: Arthropoda
- Clade: Pancrustacea
- Class: Insecta
- Order: Lepidoptera
- Family: Lecithoceridae
- Genus: Torodora
- Species: T. bracculata

Binomial name
- Torodora bracculata (Meyrick, 1911)

Synonyms
- Brachmia bracculata Meyrick, 1911

Species of moth

Torodora bracculata is a moth in the family Lecithoceridae. It was described by Edward Meyrick in 1911. It is found in Assam, India.

The wingspan is 15–17 mm. The forewings are rather dark purplish fuscous. The second discal stigma is obscurely darker and there are ochreous-white wedge-shaped strigulae on the costa at three-fourths and the dorsum before the tornus, connected by a faint sinuate whitish line. The hindwings are rather dark grey.
