= Carodista melicrata =

Scientific classification
- Kingdom: Animalia
- Phylum: Arthropoda
- Class: Insecta
- Order: Lepidoptera
- Family: Lecithoceridae
- Genus: Carodista
- Species: C. melicrata

Binomial name
- Carodista melicrata (Meyrick, 1910)

Synonyms
- Homaloxestis melicrata Meyrick, 1910

Species of moth

Carodista melicrata is a moth in the family Lecithoceridae. It was described by Edward Meyrick in 1910. It is found in Assam, India.

The wingspan is 14–15 mm. The forewings are deep ochreous yellow with light brownish markings irrorated (sprinkled) with dark fuscous. There is a spot on the base of the costa, and the costal edge is more or less suffused with dark fuscous irroration from this to three-fourths. There is an undefined cloudy fascia from one-third of the costa to the middle of the dorsum and a cloudy spot representing the second discal stigma. A triangular patch is found on the costa at two-thirds, where an irregular fascia runs to the tornus and there is an undefined patch on the upper two-thirds of the termen, edged by a dark fuscous terminal line. The hindwings are whitish ochreous tinged with grey.
