= Carodista wilpattuae =

Scientific classification
- Domain: Eukaryota
- Kingdom: Animalia
- Phylum: Arthropoda
- Class: Insecta
- Order: Lepidoptera
- Family: Lecithoceridae
- Genus: Carodista
- Species: C. wilpattuae

Binomial name
- Carodista wilpattuae Park, 2001

Species of moth

Carodista wilpattuae is a moth in the family Lecithoceridae. It is found in Sri Lanka.

The wingspan is about 13.5 mm.

== Etymology ==
The species name refers to the type location.
