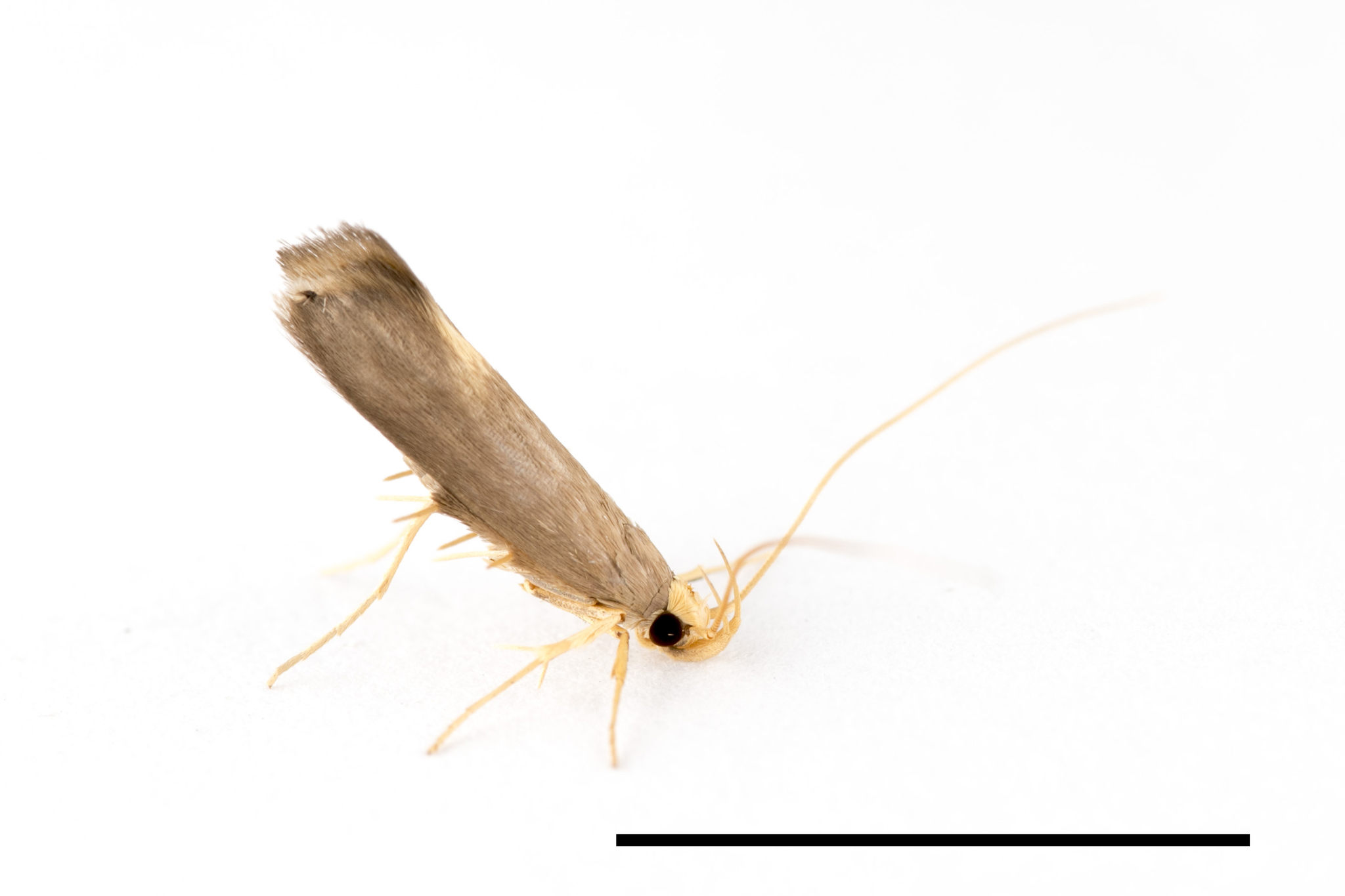

Scientific classification
- Kingdom: Animalia
- Phylum: Arthropoda
- Class: Insecta
- Order: Lepidoptera
- Family: Lecithoceridae
- Genus: Torodora
- Species: T. chinanensis

Binomial name
- Torodora chinanensis Park, 2003

= Torodora chinanensis =

Species of moth

Torodora chinanensis is a moth in the family Lecithoceridae. It is found in Taiwan. The specific name chinanensis refers to the type locality, Chinanshan ("Mt. Chinan") in Kaohsiung.

The wingspan is 25 mm.
