= Torodora octosperma =

Scientific classification
- Kingdom: Animalia
- Phylum: Arthropoda
- Clade: Pancrustacea
- Class: Insecta
- Order: Lepidoptera
- Family: Lecithoceridae
- Genus: Torodora
- Species: T. octosperma

Binomial name
- Torodora octosperma (Diakonoff, 1952)

Synonyms
- Lecithocera octosperma Diakonoff, 1952

Species of moth

Torodora octosperma is a moth in the family Lecithoceridae. It was described by Alexey Diakonoff in 1952. It is found in Burma.
