= Heteralcis clavata =

Scientific classification
- Kingdom: Animalia
- Phylum: Arthropoda
- Clade: Pancrustacea
- Class: Insecta
- Order: Lepidoptera
- Family: Lecithoceridae
- Genus: Heteralcis
- Species: H. clavata

Binomial name
- Heteralcis clavata (Park, 2001)

Synonyms
- Alciphanes clavata Park, 2001

Species of moth

Heteralcis clavata is a moth in the family Lecithoceridae. It was described by Kyu-Tek Park in 2001. It is found in Sri Lanka.

The wingspan is 12.5–13.5 mm.

== Etymology ==
The species name refers to the shape of the distal part of the valva in the male genitalia.
