= Torodora aritai =

Scientific classification
- Kingdom: Animalia
- Phylum: Arthropoda
- Clade: Pancrustacea
- Class: Insecta
- Order: Lepidoptera
- Family: Lecithoceridae
- Genus: Torodora
- Species: T. aritai

Binomial name
- Torodora aritai Park, 2002

Species of moth

Torodora aritai is a moth in the family Lecithoceridae. It was described by Kyu-Tek Park in 2002. It is found in Cambodia and Thailand.

The wingspan is about 18 mm.
