= Carodista fushanensis =

Scientific classification
- Kingdom: Animalia
- Phylum: Arthropoda
- Clade: Pancrustacea
- Class: Insecta
- Order: Lepidoptera
- Family: Lecithoceridae
- Genus: Carodista
- Species: C. fushanensis

Binomial name
- Carodista fushanensis Park, 2000

Species of moth

Carodista fushanensis is a moth in the family Lecithoceridae. It was described by Kyu-Tek Park in 2000. It is found in Taiwan.
