= Heteralcis palathodes =

Scientific classification
- Domain: Eukaryota
- Kingdom: Animalia
- Phylum: Arthropoda
- Class: Insecta
- Order: Lepidoptera
- Family: Lecithoceridae
- Genus: Heteralcis
- Species: H. palathodes

Binomial name
- Heteralcis palathodes (Meyrick, 1906)

Synonyms
- Timyra palathodes Meyrick, 1906

Species of moth

Heteralcis palathodes is a moth in the family Lecithoceridae. It was described by Edward Meyrick in 1906. It is found in Sri Lanka.

The wingspan is 14–16 mm. The forewings are ochreous yellow with small dark fuscous spots on the costa at and near the base, and near the base of the dorsum. There are three irregular obscure brownish-ochreous fasciae at one-fourth, the middle, and three-fourths, dilated in the disc, and a similar transverse line before the second, sometimes mostly confluent with it, the third sometimes suffused with fuscous. The hindwings are dark grey in males, with the apex whitish ochreous, with a subdorsal groove enclosing a long ochreous-yellowish hair-pencil. The hindwings of the females are grey, with the apex and upper part of the termen suffused with whitish ochreous.
