= Torodora octavana =

Scientific classification
- Kingdom: Animalia
- Phylum: Arthropoda
- Class: Insecta
- Order: Lepidoptera
- Family: Lecithoceridae
- Genus: Torodora
- Species: T. octavana

Binomial name
- Torodora octavana (Meyrick, 1911)

Synonyms
- Brachmia octavana Meyrick, 1911; Lecithocera octavana

Species of moth

Torodora octavana is a moth in the family Lecithoceridae. It is found in Taiwan, India, and Sichuan, Kwanhsien and Zhejiang in China.

The wingspan is 22–23 mm. The forewings are brown, sprinkled with dark fuscous, with a strong purplish gloss. The costal edge is ochreous-orange and the plical and first discal stigmata are indicated by two very obscure somewhat lighter ochreous-brown spots, the second discal by a similar 8-shaped spot centered with two dark fuscous dots. There is an obscure ochreous-brown subterminal line, the central third somewhat curved outwards. There is also an interrupted blackish terminal line. The hindwings are grey.
