= Torodora notacma =

Scientific classification
- Kingdom: Animalia
- Phylum: Arthropoda
- Clade: Pancrustacea
- Class: Insecta
- Order: Lepidoptera
- Family: Lecithoceridae
- Genus: Torodora
- Species: T. notacma

Binomial name
- Torodora notacma C.S. Wu, 1997

Species of moth

Torodora notacma is a moth in the family Lecithoceridae. It was described by Chun-Sheng Wu in 1997. It is found in Xizang, China.
