= Torodora rectivalvata =

Scientific classification
- Kingdom: Animalia
- Phylum: Arthropoda
- Class: Insecta
- Order: Lepidoptera
- Family: Lecithoceridae
- Genus: Torodora
- Species: T. rectivalvata

Binomial name
- Torodora rectivalvata Park, 2007

Species of moth

Torodora rectivalvata is a moth in the family Lecithoceridae described by Kyu-Tek Park in 2007. It is found in Chiang Mai Province, Thailand.

The wingspan is 17.5–18 mm.
