= Heteralcis platycapna =

Scientific classification
- Domain: Eukaryota
- Kingdom: Animalia
- Phylum: Arthropoda
- Class: Insecta
- Order: Lepidoptera
- Family: Lecithoceridae
- Genus: Heteralcis
- Species: H. platycapna

Binomial name
- Heteralcis platycapna (Meyrick, 1916)

Synonyms
- Timyra platycapna Meyrick, 1916

Species of moth

Heteralcis platycapna is a moth in the family Lecithoceridae. It was described by Edward Meyrick in 1916. It is found in Sri Lanka.

The wingspan is 13–14 mm. The forewings are rather dark fuscous with a transverse ochreous-whitish line almost at the base and a transverse whitish-ochreous line before the middle, somewhat curved outwards on each half and indented in the middle. There is also a suffused ochreous-yellow patch occupying the apical fifth. The hindwings are grey.
