= Torodora fuscobasalis =

Scientific classification
- Kingdom: Animalia
- Phylum: Arthropoda
- Clade: Pancrustacea
- Class: Insecta
- Order: Lepidoptera
- Family: Lecithoceridae
- Genus: Torodora
- Species: T. fuscobasalis

Binomial name
- Torodora fuscobasalis Park, 2002

Species of moth

Torodora fuscobasalis is a moth in the family Lecithoceridae. It was described by Kyu-Tek Park in 2002. It is found in Thailand.

The wingspan is about 17 mm.
