= Torodora silvatica =

Scientific classification
- Kingdom: Animalia
- Phylum: Arthropoda
- Clade: Pancrustacea
- Class: Insecta
- Order: Lepidoptera
- Family: Lecithoceridae
- Genus: Torodora
- Species: T. silvatica

Binomial name
- Torodora silvatica Park, 2007

Species of moth

Torodora silvatica is a moth in the family Lecithoceridae. It was described by Kyu-Tek Park in 2007. It is found in Thailand.
