= Torodora sirtalis =

Scientific classification
- Kingdom: Animalia
- Phylum: Arthropoda
- Clade: Pancrustacea
- Class: Insecta
- Order: Lepidoptera
- Family: Lecithoceridae
- Genus: Torodora
- Species: T. sirtalis

Binomial name
- Torodora sirtalis Wu, 1997

Species of moth

Torodora sirtalis is a moth in the family Lecithoceridae. It was described by Chun-Sheng Wu in 1997. It is found in China (Yunnan) and Vietnam.
