= Torodora invariella =

Scientific classification
- Kingdom: Animalia
- Phylum: Arthropoda
- Class: Insecta
- Order: Lepidoptera
- Family: Lecithoceridae
- Genus: Torodora
- Species: T. invariella

Binomial name
- Torodora invariella (Walker, 1864)

Synonyms
- Gelechia invariella Walker, 1864

Species of moth

Torodora invariella is a moth in the family Lecithoceridae. It was described by Francis Walker in 1864. It is found on Borneo.

Adults are cinereous aeneous (ash-bronze coloured), with the wings rather broad. The forewings have a minute oblique whitish mark on the costa at three-fourths of the length and a pale cinereous line on the base of the fringe. The costa is nearly straight and the exterior border is not oblique, but slightly excavated in front.
