= Torodora leucochlora =

Scientific classification
- Kingdom: Animalia
- Phylum: Arthropoda
- Class: Insecta
- Order: Lepidoptera
- Family: Lecithoceridae
- Genus: Torodora
- Species: T. leucochlora

Binomial name
- Torodora leucochlora (Meyrick, 1910)

Synonyms
- Lecithocera leucochlora Meyrick, 1910

Species of moth

Torodora leucochlora is a moth in the family Lecithoceridae. It was described by Edward Meyrick in 1910. It is found on Borneo.

The wingspan is 16–18 mm. The forewings are light ochreous yellow with the extreme base white and with a straight white fascia near the base, as well as a straight white fascia before the middle, preceded by a fascia of light brownish suffusion. The hindwings are pale whitish yellowish, more whitish towards the base.
