= Torodora serpentina =

Scientific classification
- Domain: Eukaryota
- Kingdom: Animalia
- Phylum: Arthropoda
- Class: Insecta
- Order: Lepidoptera
- Family: Lecithoceridae
- Genus: Torodora
- Species: T. serpentina

Binomial name
- Torodora serpentina (Diakonoff, 1951)

Synonyms
- Panplatyceros serpentina Diakonoff, 1951

Species of moth

Torodora serpentina is a moth in the family Lecithoceridae. It was described by Alexey Diakonoff in 1951. It is found in Burma.
