= Tetanops heryngii =

Scientific classification
- Kingdom: Animalia
- Phylum: Arthropoda
- Clade: Pancrustacea
- Class: Insecta
- Order: Diptera
- Family: Ulidiidae
- Genus: Tetanops
- Species: T. heryngii

Binomial name
- Tetanops heryngii (Rondani, 1856)

Synonyms
- Terelliosoma heryngii Rondani, 1856

Species of fly

Terelliosoma heryngii is a species of ulidiid or picture-winged fly in the genus Tetanops of the family Ulidiidae.
