= Torodora parasema =

Scientific classification
- Kingdom: Animalia
- Phylum: Arthropoda
- Clade: Pancrustacea
- Class: Insecta
- Order: Lepidoptera
- Family: Lecithoceridae
- Genus: Torodora
- Species: T. parasema

Binomial name
- Torodora parasema (Meyrick, 1913)

Synonyms
- Brachmia parasema Meyrick, 1913

Species of moth

Torodora parasema is a moth in the family Lecithoceridae. It was described by Edward Meyrick in 1913. It is found in India (Bengal, Kanara, Himachal Pradesh).

The wingspan is 13–15 mm. The forewings are rather dark purplish fuscous with two blackish fasciae, slightly less oblique than the termen, at two-fifths and four-fifths respectively, the first rather dilated anteriorly in the disc, the second posteriorly edged with ochreous whitish on the costal third and rather convex on the middle third. There is a transverse blackish spot in the disc before the second fascia, its lower extremity tending to be separated. The hindwings are pale grey.
