= Torodora styloidea =

Scientific classification
- Domain: Eukaryota
- Kingdom: Animalia
- Phylum: Arthropoda
- Class: Insecta
- Order: Lepidoptera
- Family: Lecithoceridae
- Genus: Torodora
- Species: T. styloidea

Binomial name
- Torodora styloidea H. Wang and M. Wang, 2010

Species of moth

Torodora styloidea is a moth in the family Lecithoceridae. It is found in Guangxi, China.

The wingspan is 25–30 mm.
