= Torodora chatolensis =

Scientific classification
- Kingdom: Animalia
- Phylum: Arthropoda
- Clade: Pancrustacea
- Class: Insecta
- Order: Lepidoptera
- Family: Lecithoceridae
- Genus: Torodora
- Species: T. chatolensis

Binomial name
- Torodora chatolensis Park, 2008

Species of moth

Torodora chatolensis is a moth in the family Lecithoceridae. It was described by Kyu-Tek Park in 2008. It is found on Luzon in the Philippines.
