= Torodora straminala =

Scientific classification
- Kingdom: Animalia
- Phylum: Arthropoda
- Clade: Pancrustacea
- Class: Insecta
- Order: Lepidoptera
- Family: Lecithoceridae
- Genus: Torodora
- Species: T. straminala

Binomial name
- Torodora straminala Gozmány, 2002

Species of moth

Torodora straminala is a moth in the family Lecithoceridae. It was described by László Anthony Gozmány in 2002. It is found in Pakistan.
