= Torodora sciadosa =

Scientific classification
- Domain: Eukaryota
- Kingdom: Animalia
- Phylum: Arthropoda
- Class: Insecta
- Order: Lepidoptera
- Family: Lecithoceridae
- Genus: Torodora
- Species: T. sciadosa

Binomial name
- Torodora sciadosa Wu & Liu, 1994

Species of moth

Torodora sciadosa is a moth in the family Lecithoceridae. It is found in Taiwan and Sichuan, China.

The wingspan is 18 mm.
