= Torodora niphotricha =

Scientific classification
- Domain: Eukaryota
- Kingdom: Animalia
- Phylum: Arthropoda
- Class: Insecta
- Order: Lepidoptera
- Family: Lecithoceridae
- Genus: Torodora
- Species: T. niphotricha

Binomial name
- Torodora niphotricha (Diakonoff, 1967)

Synonyms
- Lecithocera niphotricha Diakonoff, [1968]

Species of moth

Torodora niphotricha is a moth in the family Lecithoceridae. It was described by Alexey Diakonoff in 1967. It is found on Luzon in the Philippines.

The wingspan is about 14 mm. The forewings are glossy fuscous, with the edge of the posterior half of the wing narrowly and suffusedly margined with dark fuscous. The hindwings are paler fuscous with a coppery gloss.
