= Torodora syrphetodes =

Scientific classification
- Kingdom: Animalia
- Phylum: Arthropoda
- Clade: Pancrustacea
- Class: Insecta
- Order: Lepidoptera
- Family: Lecithoceridae
- Genus: Torodora
- Species: T. syrphetodes

Binomial name
- Torodora syrphetodes (Meyrick, 1906)

Synonyms
- Brachmia syrphetodes Meyrick, 1906

Species of moth

Torodora syrphetodes is a moth in the family Lecithoceridae. It was described by Edward Meyrick in 1906. It is found in Sri Lanka.

The wingspan is 25–27 mm. The forewings are fuscous, partially suffused with dark fuscous, irregularly strewn with pale ochreous. There is a small dark fuscous subbasal spot towards the costa. The discal stigmata are rather large, suffused and dark fuscous, connected by an irregular elongate pale ochreous patch, an additional dark fuscous dot before and above the second. There is a cloudy whitish-ochreous subterminal line, somewhat curved and indented beneath the costa. The hindwings are light fuscous.
