= Carodista grypotatos =

Scientific classification
- Domain: Eukaryota
- Kingdom: Animalia
- Phylum: Arthropoda
- Class: Insecta
- Order: Lepidoptera
- Family: Lecithoceridae
- Genus: Carodista
- Species: C. grypotatos

Binomial name
- Carodista grypotatos Park, 2001

Species of moth

Carodista grypotatos is a moth in the family Lecithoceridae. It is found in Sri Lanka.

The wingspan is 21–22 mm.

== Etymology ==
The species name refers to the horn on the ventral margin of the valva and is derived from gryp (meaning hooked).
