= Torodora vietnamensis =

Scientific classification
- Kingdom: Animalia
- Phylum: Arthropoda
- Class: Insecta
- Order: Lepidoptera
- Family: Lecithoceridae
- Genus: Torodora
- Species: T. vietnamensis

Binomial name
- Torodora vietnamensis Park, 2007

Species of moth

Torodora vietnamensis is a moth in the family Lecithoceridae described by Kyu-Tek Park in 2007. It is found in northern Vietnam.

The wingspan is 19–20 mm.

== Etymology ==
The specific name is derived from the country of the type locality.
