= Torodora bacillaris =

Scientific classification
- Kingdom: Animalia
- Phylum: Arthropoda
- Class: Insecta
- Order: Lepidoptera
- Family: Lecithoceridae
- Genus: Torodora
- Species: T. bacillaris

Binomial name
- Torodora bacillaris Wang and Xiong, 2010

Species of moth

Torodora bacillaris is a moth in the family Lecithoceridae. It is found in Guangdong, China.

The wingspan is 26–30 mm.
