= Carodista flagitiosa =

Scientific classification
- Kingdom: Animalia
- Phylum: Arthropoda
- Class: Insecta
- Order: Lepidoptera
- Family: Lecithoceridae
- Genus: Carodista
- Species: C. flagitiosa

Binomial name
- Carodista flagitiosa (Meyrick, 1914)

Synonyms
- Homaloxestis flagitiosa Meyrick, 1914

Species of moth

Carodista flagitiosa is a moth in the family Lecithoceridae. It was described by Edward Meyrick in 1914. It is found in Malawi.

The wingspan is about 14 mm. The forewings are dark fuscous, faintly purplish tinged. The discal stigmata are faintly indicated as darker spots. The hindwings are dark grey.
