= Torodora recurvata =

Scientific classification
- Kingdom: Animalia
- Phylum: Arthropoda
- Class: Insecta
- Order: Lepidoptera
- Family: Lecithoceridae
- Genus: Torodora
- Species: T. recurvata

Binomial name
- Torodora recurvata (Meyrick, 1923)

Synonyms
- Lecithocera recurvata Meyrick, 1923; Lecithocera phanerostoma Diakonoff, [1968]

Species of moth

Torodora recurvata is a moth in the family Lecithoceridae. It was described by Edward Meyrick in 1923. It is found in the Philippines on the islands of Luzon and Mindanao.

The wingspan is 16–18 mm. The forewings are light fuscous with the terminal edge dark fuscous. The hindwings are dark grey.
