= Torodora ventralilata =

Scientific classification
- Kingdom: Animalia
- Phylum: Arthropoda
- Clade: Pancrustacea
- Class: Insecta
- Order: Lepidoptera
- Family: Lecithoceridae
- Genus: Torodora
- Species: T. ventralilata

Binomial name
- Torodora ventralilata Wu & Park, 1999

Species of moth

Torodora ventralilata is a moth in the family Lecithoceridae. It was described by Chun-Sheng Wu and Kyu-Tek Park in 1999. It is found in Sri Lanka.
