= Torodora babeana =

Scientific classification
- Kingdom: Animalia
- Phylum: Arthropoda
- Class: Insecta
- Order: Lepidoptera
- Family: Lecithoceridae
- Genus: Torodora
- Species: T. babeana

Binomial name
- Torodora babeana Park, 2007

Species of moth

Torodora babeana is a moth in the family Lecithoceridae described by Kyu-Tek Park in 2007. It is found in northern Vietnam.

The wingspan is 19–20 mm.

== Etymology ==
The specific name is derived from the geographic locality of four of the paratypes, Ba Bể, Vietnam.
