= Carodista galeodes =

Scientific classification
- Kingdom: Animalia
- Phylum: Arthropoda
- Class: Insecta
- Order: Lepidoptera
- Family: Lecithoceridae
- Genus: Carodista
- Species: C. galeodes

Binomial name
- Carodista galeodes (Meyrick, 1910)

Synonyms
- Homaloxestis galeodes Meyrick, 1910

Species of moth

Carodista galeodes is a moth in the family Lecithoceridae. It was described by Edward Meyrick in 1910. It is found in Assam, India.

The wingspan is 10–12 mm. The forewings are glossy whitish ochreous, tinged with fuscous. The hindwings are grey.
