= Carodista flavicana =

Scientific classification
- Kingdom: Animalia
- Phylum: Arthropoda
- Clade: Pancrustacea
- Class: Insecta
- Order: Lepidoptera
- Family: Lecithoceridae
- Genus: Carodista
- Species: C. flavicana

Binomial name
- Carodista flavicana C. S. Wu, 2003

Species of moth

Carodista flavicana is a moth in the family Lecithoceridae. It was described by Chun-Sheng Wu in 2003. It is found in Guizhou, China.
