= Torodora galera =

Scientific classification
- Domain: Eukaryota
- Kingdom: Animalia
- Phylum: Arthropoda
- Class: Insecta
- Order: Lepidoptera
- Family: Lecithoceridae
- Genus: Torodora
- Species: T. galera

Binomial name
- Torodora galera Wu & Liu, 1994

Species of moth

Torodora galera is a moth in the family Lecithoceridae. It is found in southeastern China (Fujian). Earlier records from Taiwan were in 2003 described as a distinct species, Torodora pseudogalera, with Torodora galera still appearing in some checklists of Taiwanese fauna but not others.
