= Torodora nyctiphron =

Scientific classification
- Kingdom: Animalia
- Phylum: Arthropoda
- Class: Insecta
- Order: Lepidoptera
- Family: Lecithoceridae
- Genus: Torodora
- Species: T. nyctiphron

Binomial name
- Torodora nyctiphron (Meyrick, 1931)

Synonyms
- Lecithocera nyctiphron Meyrick, 1931

Species of moth

Torodora nyctiphron is a moth in the family Lecithoceridae. It was described by Edward Meyrick in 1931. It is found in Sikkim, India.
