= Tetanops vittifrons =

Scientific classification
- Kingdom: Animalia
- Phylum: Arthropoda
- Class: Insecta
- Order: Diptera
- Family: Ulidiidae
- Genus: Tetanops
- Species: T. vittifrons

Binomial name
- Tetanops vittifrons Wulp, 1899

Species of fly

Tetanops vittifrons is a species of ulidiid or picture-winged fly in the genus Tetanops of the family Ulidiidae.
