= Torodora fortis =

Scientific classification
- Kingdom: Animalia
- Phylum: Arthropoda
- Class: Insecta
- Order: Lepidoptera
- Family: Lecithoceridae
- Genus: Torodora
- Species: T. fortis

Binomial name
- Torodora fortis (Meyrick, 1918)

Synonyms
- Lecithocera fortis Meyrick, 1918

Species of moth

Torodora fortis is a moth in the family Lecithoceridae. It was described by Edward Meyrick in 1918. It is found in southern India.

The wingspan is about 19 mm. The forewings are light fuscous, the costa anteriorly darker, with a slight blackish subcostal mark at the base and a triangular sharply defined blackish blotch in the disc about one-third, its apex resting on the fold anteriorly, the base direct-transverse posteriorly. There is a blackish mark on the costa before the middle and a sharply marked transverse blackish spot in the disc at three-fifths, rather widened upwards. An indistinct pale greyish-ochreous transverse line is found at four-fifths parallel to the termen, edged anteriorly with dark fuscous suffusion, indented above the middle. The hindwings are pale ochreous grey.
