= Tetanops eryngii =

Scientific classification
- Kingdom: Animalia
- Phylum: Arthropoda
- Class: Insecta
- Order: Diptera
- Family: Ulidiidae
- Genus: Tetanops
- Species: T. eryngii

Binomial name
- Tetanops eryngii Schembri, Gatt and Schembri, 1991

Species of fly

Tetanops eryngii is a species of ulidiid or picture-winged fly in the genus Tetanops of the family Ulidiidae.
