= Carodista montana =

Scientific classification
- Domain: Eukaryota
- Kingdom: Animalia
- Phylum: Arthropoda
- Class: Insecta
- Order: Lepidoptera
- Family: Lecithoceridae
- Genus: Carodista
- Species: C. montana

Binomial name
- Carodista montana Park, 1999

Species of moth

Carodista montana is a moth in the family Lecithoceridae. It is found in Taiwan.
