= Torodora chumphonica =

Scientific classification
- Kingdom: Animalia
- Phylum: Arthropoda
- Clade: Pancrustacea
- Class: Insecta
- Order: Lepidoptera
- Family: Lecithoceridae
- Genus: Torodora
- Species: T. chumphonica

Binomial name
- Torodora chumphonica Park, 2002

Species of moth

Torodora chumphonica is a moth in the family Lecithoceridae. It was described by Kyu-Tek Park in 2002. It is found in Thailand.

The wingspan is about 15 mm. The forewings are brown with inconspicuous discal spots.

== Etymology ==
The species name is derived from Chun phon in Thailand, the type locality.
