= Carodista trichopla =

Scientific classification
- Kingdom: Animalia
- Phylum: Arthropoda
- Class: Insecta
- Order: Lepidoptera
- Family: Lecithoceridae
- Genus: Carodista
- Species: C. trichopla

Binomial name
- Carodista trichopla (Meyrick, 1929)

Synonyms
- Homaloxestis trichopla Meyrick, 1929

Species of moth

Carodista trichopla is a moth in the family Lecithoceridae. It was described by Edward Meyrick in 1929. It is found in Assam, India.
