= Torodora youwon =

Scientific classification
- Kingdom: Animalia
- Phylum: Arthropoda
- Class: Insecta
- Order: Lepidoptera
- Family: Lecithoceridae
- Genus: Torodora
- Species: T. youwon

Binomial name
- Torodora youwon Park, 2010

Species of moth

Torodora youwon is a moth in the family Lecithoceridae. It was described by Kyu-Tek Park in 2010. It is found in Thailand.
