= Carodista lycopis =

Scientific classification
- Kingdom: Animalia
- Phylum: Arthropoda
- Class: Insecta
- Order: Lepidoptera
- Family: Lecithoceridae
- Genus: Carodista
- Species: C. lycopis

Binomial name
- Carodista lycopis (Meyrick, 1911)

Synonyms
- Brachmia lycopis Meyrick, 1911; Lecithocera lycopis (Meyrick, 1911)

Species of moth

Carodista lycopis is a moth in the family Lecithoceridae. It was described by Edward Meyrick in 1911. It is found in Sri Lanka.

The wingspan is about 19 mm. The forewings are dark fuscous, slightly purplish tinged. The stigmata are brownish or pale brownish-ochreous edged with some blackish scales, the plical slightly beyond the first discal, both these small, the second discal rather large. The hindwings are grey.
