= Torodora quadrangulata =

Scientific classification
- Kingdom: Animalia
- Phylum: Arthropoda
- Class: Insecta
- Order: Lepidoptera
- Family: Lecithoceridae
- Genus: Torodora
- Species: T. quadrangulata

Binomial name
- Torodora quadrangulata Wadhawan & Walia, 2007

Species of moth

Torodora quadrangulata is a moth in the family Lecithoceridae. It was described by Deepak Wadhawan and Virinder Kumar Walia in 2007. It is found in India.

The wingspan is about 20 mm. The hindwings are greyish brown. Adults have been recorded on wing in June and August.

== Etymology ==
The species name refers to the squarish shape of gnathos.
