= Torodora opportuna =

Scientific classification
- Kingdom: Animalia
- Phylum: Arthropoda
- Class: Insecta
- Order: Lepidoptera
- Family: Lecithoceridae
- Genus: Torodora
- Species: T. opportuna

Binomial name
- Torodora opportuna (Meyrick, 1923)

Synonyms
- Lecithocera opportuna Meyrick, 1923

Species of moth

Torodora opportuna is a moth in the family Lecithoceridae. It was described by Edward Meyrick in 1923. It is found in Assam, India.

The wingspan is 16–17 mm. The forewings are light fuscous, sometimes darker posteriorly. The discal stigmata are dark fuscous, with an additional dot beneath the second. There is an oblique ochreous-whitish mark from the costa at three-fourths, where a faint pale line curved or bent above the middle runs to the dorsum at five-sixths. The hindwings are pale greyish, more or less tinged whitish ochreous.
