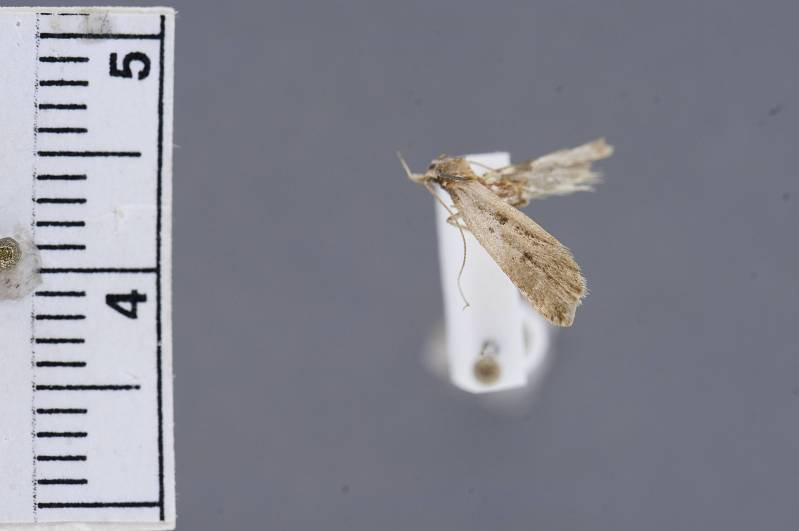

Scientific classification
- Kingdom: Animalia
- Phylum: Arthropoda
- Clade: Pancrustacea
- Class: Insecta
- Order: Lepidoptera
- Family: Lecithoceridae
- Genus: Carodista
- Species: C. fabajuxta

Binomial name
- Carodista fabajuxta C. S. Wu & Park, 1999

= Carodista fabajuxta =

Species of moth

Carodista fabajuxta is a moth in the family Lecithoceridae. It was described by Chun-Sheng Wu and Kyu-Tek Park in 1999. It is found in Sri Lanka.

The wingspan is about 18 mm. The forewings are ochreous brown with a brownish pattern, with distinct dots at the fold and the cell, as well as a distinct discocellular dot. The hindwings are ochreous.

== Etymology ==
The species name is derived from Latin faba (meaning bean) and juxta.
