= Tetanops parallelus =

Scientific classification
- Kingdom: Animalia
- Phylum: Arthropoda
- Clade: Pancrustacea
- Class: Insecta
- Order: Diptera
- Family: Ulidiidae
- Genus: Tetanops
- Species: T. parallelus

Binomial name
- Tetanops parallelus Steyskal, 1970

Species of fly

Tetanops parallelus is a species of ulidiid or picture-winged fly in the genus Tetanops of the family Tephritidae.
