= Torodora rectilinea =

Scientific classification
- Domain: Eukaryota
- Kingdom: Animalia
- Phylum: Arthropoda
- Class: Insecta
- Order: Lepidoptera
- Family: Lecithoceridae
- Genus: Torodora
- Species: T. rectilinea

Binomial name
- Torodora rectilinea Park, 2003

Species of moth

Torodora rectilinea is a moth in the family Lecithoceridae. It is found in Taiwan.
