= Torodora niphadodes =

Scientific classification
- Kingdom: Animalia
- Phylum: Arthropoda
- Class: Insecta
- Order: Lepidoptera
- Family: Lecithoceridae
- Genus: Torodora
- Species: T. niphadodes

Binomial name
- Torodora niphadodes Park & Lee, 2012

Species of moth

Torodora niphadodes is a moth in the family Lecithoceridae. It was described by Kyu-Tek Park and Sang-Mi Lee in 2012. It is found in Palawan in the Philippines.
