= Torodora pellax =

Scientific classification
- Kingdom: Animalia
- Phylum: Arthropoda
- Class: Insecta
- Order: Lepidoptera
- Family: Lecithoceridae
- Genus: Torodora
- Species: T. pellax

Binomial name
- Torodora pellax (Meyrick, 1911)

Synonyms
- Brachmia pellax Meyrick, 1911

Species of moth

Torodora pellax is a moth in the family Lecithoceridae. It was described by Edward Meyrick in 1911. It is found in Assam, India.

The wingspan is 16–20 mm. The forewings are dark purplish fuscous, with the stigmata cloudy and blackish fuscous, the plical beneath the first discal, sometimes suffused with it into an undefined cloudy blotch, the second discal forming a transverse somewhat 8-shaped mark. There is a small cloudy ochreous-whitish spot on the costa at four-fifths, where a slightly curved obscure ochreous-whitish line runs to the dorsum before the tornus. The hindwings are grey.
