= Torodora hybrista =

Scientific classification
- Kingdom: Animalia
- Phylum: Arthropoda
- Class: Insecta
- Order: Lepidoptera
- Family: Lecithoceridae
- Genus: Torodora
- Species: T. hybrista

Binomial name
- Torodora hybrista (Meyrick, 1922)

Synonyms
- Lecithocera hybrista Meyrick, 1922

Species of moth

Torodora hybrista is a moth in the family Lecithoceridae. It was described by Edward Meyrick in 1922. It is found in Senegal.

The wingspan is about 18 mm. The forewings are dark violet fuscous and the hindwings are rather dark grey.
