= Torodora dinosigna =

Scientific classification
- Kingdom: Animalia
- Phylum: Arthropoda
- Clade: Pancrustacea
- Class: Insecta
- Order: Lepidoptera
- Family: Lecithoceridae
- Genus: Torodora
- Species: T. dinosigna

Binomial name
- Torodora dinosigna Gozmány, 1973

Species of moth

Torodora dinosigna is a moth in the family Lecithoceridae. It was described by László Anthony Gozmány in 1973. It is found in Nepal.
