= Tetanops myopaeformis =

Scientific classification
- Kingdom: Animalia
- Phylum: Arthropoda
- Clade: Pancrustacea
- Class: Insecta
- Order: Diptera
- Family: Ulidiidae
- Genus: Tetanops
- Species: T. myopaeformis

Binomial name
- Tetanops myopaeformis (von Röder, 1881)

Species of fly

Tetanops myopaeformis, the sugar beet root maggot, is a species of picture-winged fly in the genus Tetanops of the family Ulidiidae. It is a serious pest of sugarbeets in North America.

The fly was described first by the name Eurycephala myopaeformis by Viktor von Röder in 1881. In 1907 the name was emended by Friedrich Hendel to Eurycephalomyia in order to avoid confusion with the preoccupied name Eurycephala for a genus of leaf bugs, now called Halticus.
