= Torodora carcerata =

Scientific classification
- Kingdom: Animalia
- Phylum: Arthropoda
- Class: Insecta
- Order: Lepidoptera
- Family: Lecithoceridae
- Genus: Torodora
- Species: T. carcerata

Binomial name
- Torodora carcerata (Meyrick, 1923)

Synonyms
- Lecithocera carcerata Meyrick, 1923

Species of moth

Torodora carcerata is a moth in the family Lecithoceridae. It was described by Edward Meyrick in 1923. It is found in Assam, India.

The wingspan is about 15 mm. The forewings are light lilac fuscous with a dark fuscous transverse fasciate blotch from the dorsum at two-fifths reaching three-fourths across the wing, both sides prominent in the middle. There is an elongate blackish mark on the costa beyond this and two dark fuscous dots transversely placed in the disc at three-fifths, as well as a nearly straight ochreous-whitish subterminal line at four-fifths, preceded by a fascia of rather dark fuscous suffusion. There are also some minute blackish terminal dots. The hindwings are light grey.
