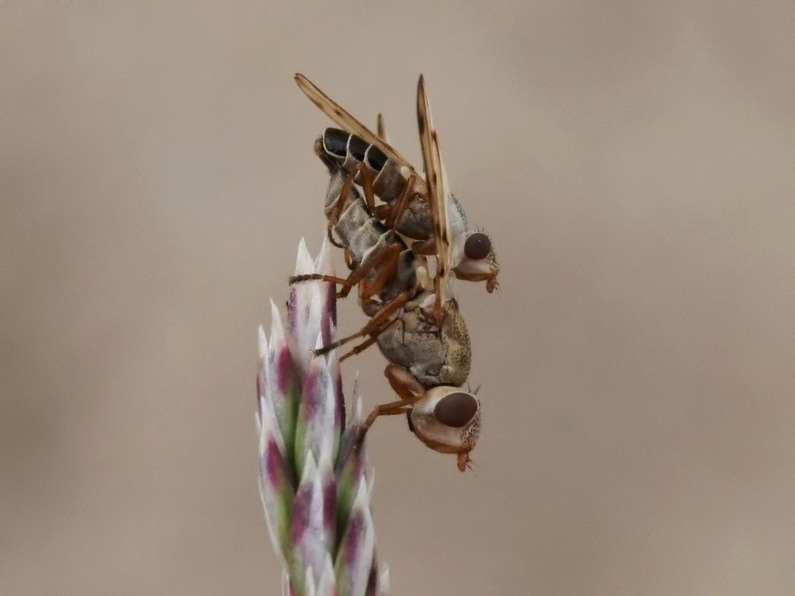

Scientific classification
- Kingdom: Animalia
- Phylum: Arthropoda
- Class: Insecta
- Order: Diptera
- Family: Ulidiidae
- Genus: Tetanops
- Species: T. myopina

Binomial name
- Tetanops myopina Fallen, 1820

= Tetanops myopina =

Species of fly

Tetanops myopina is a species of fly in the family Ulidiidae. It is found in the Palearctic. On the bulky wedge-shaped head the orbits have a large posterior macrochaete.The antennae are reddish. The body is transparent red covered in a dense grey white.The abdomen is gloss black, partially covered white in bands and a stripe, more so in the female. There are two pairs of prescutellar acrosticals and one pair of posterior dorsocentrals. The legs are entirely reddish. Long. : 5–7 mm.

T. myopina is xerophilous and found in sand dunes. Adults preferably hide close to roots of the Marram grass (on which the larvae feed) and seldom fly. Their greyish dull appearance makes them well camouflaged on sandy ground.
