= Tetanops rufifrons =

Scientific classification
- Kingdom: Animalia
- Phylum: Arthropoda
- Class: Insecta
- Order: Diptera
- Family: Ulidiidae
- Genus: Tetanops
- Species: T. rufifrons

Binomial name
- Tetanops rufifrons Wulp, 1899

Species of fly

Tetanops rufifrons is a species of ulidiid or picture-winged fly in the genus Tetanops of the family Ulidiidae.
