= Torodora frustans =

Scientific classification
- Domain: Eukaryota
- Kingdom: Animalia
- Phylum: Arthropoda
- Class: Insecta
- Order: Lepidoptera
- Family: Lecithoceridae
- Genus: Torodora
- Species: T. frustans

Binomial name
- Torodora frustans (Diakonoff, 1952)

Synonyms
- Lecithocera frustans Diakonoff, 1952

Species of moth

Torodora frustans is a moth in the family Lecithoceridae. It was described by Alexey Diakonoff in 1952. It is found in Burma.
