= Torodora loeica =

Scientific classification
- Kingdom: Animalia
- Phylum: Arthropoda
- Clade: Pancrustacea
- Class: Insecta
- Order: Lepidoptera
- Family: Lecithoceridae
- Genus: Torodora
- Species: T. loeica

Binomial name
- Torodora loeica Park, 2002

Species of moth

Torodora loeica is a moth in the family Lecithoceridae. It was described by Kyu-Tek Park in 2002. It is found in Vietnam and Thailand.

The wingspan is 16–17 mm.

== Etymology ==
The species name refers to Loei in Thailand, the type location.
