= Heteralcis rhizophora =

Scientific classification
- Domain: Eukaryota
- Kingdom: Animalia
- Phylum: Arthropoda
- Class: Insecta
- Order: Lepidoptera
- Family: Lecithoceridae
- Genus: Heteralcis
- Species: H. rhizophora

Binomial name
- Heteralcis rhizophora (Meyrick, 1919)

Synonyms
- Timyra rhizophora Meyrick, 1919

Species of moth

Heteralcis rhizophora is a moth in the family Lecithoceridae. It was described by Edward Meyrick in 1919. It is found in Chennai, India.

The wingspan is about 15 mm. The forewings are ochreous brown, the basal area irrorated (sprinkled) with dark brown and with two cloudy whitish dots at the base and three connected with the extensions of the following fascia. There is a moderate slightly oblique yellow fascia at one-fourth, the anterior edge very irregular, posterior margined with whitish. A triangular whitish blotch posteriorly suffused with light yellow is found on the costa at about two-thirds, reaching halfway across the wing and there is a small irregular whitish spot above the tornus. The apical and terminal edge are slenderly suffused with yellow. The hindwings are whitish ochreous, with some longitudinal grey irroration in the disc and a submedian groove forming a deep furrow, lined with pale yellowish hairs.
