= Torodora chlorobapta =

Scientific classification
- Kingdom: Animalia
- Phylum: Arthropoda
- Class: Insecta
- Order: Lepidoptera
- Family: Lecithoceridae
- Genus: Torodora
- Species: T. chlorobapta

Binomial name
- Torodora chlorobapta (Meyrick, 1931)

Synonyms
- Lecithocera chlorobapta Meyrick, 1931

Species of moth

Torodora chlorobapta is a moth in the family Lecithoceridae. It was described by Edward Meyrick in 1931. It is found in Sikkim, India.
