= Heteralcis holocona =

Scientific classification
- Domain: Eukaryota
- Kingdom: Animalia
- Phylum: Arthropoda
- Class: Insecta
- Order: Lepidoptera
- Family: Lecithoceridae
- Genus: Heteralcis
- Species: H. holocona

Binomial name
- Heteralcis holocona (Meyrick, 1908)

Synonyms
- Timyra holocona Meyrick, 1908

Species of moth

Heteralcis holocona is a moth in the family Lecithoceridae. It was described by Edward Meyrick in 1908. It is found in Sri Lanka.

The wingspan is 16–18 mm. The forewings are dark fuscous, faintly purplish tinged and with a yellowish basal dot. There are two irregular inwardly oblique pale yellowish transverse lines before and beyond one-fourth and a triangular ochreous-yellow blotch on the costa beyond the middle, reaching more than halfway across the wing, as well as a yellow dot in the disc beyond the apex of this. The hindwings are dark fuscous, with a submedian groove containing an expansible pencil of very long whitish-ochreous hairs.
