= Carodista geraea =

Scientific classification
- Kingdom: Animalia
- Phylum: Arthropoda
- Class: Insecta
- Order: Lepidoptera
- Family: Lecithoceridae
- Genus: Carodista
- Species: C. geraea

Binomial name
- Carodista geraea (Meyrick, 1911)

Synonyms
- Brachmia geraea Meyrick, 1911; Lecithocera geraea (Meyrick, 1911)

Species of moth

Carodista geraea is a moth in the family Lecithoceridae. It was described by Edward Meyrick in 1911. It is found in Sri Lanka.

The wingspan is 16–19 mm. The forewings are dark fuscous, faintly purplish tinged. The stigmata are cloudy and blackish, the plical somewhat beyond the first discal, both more or less edged posteriorly with pale fuscous or ochreous, the second discal and an additional dot beneath it more or less edged with pale fuscous or ochreous so as to form an 8-shaped mark. There is an obscure pale ochreous mark on the costa at four-fifths, where sometimes a faint sinuate pale line indented above the middle crosses the wing. The hindwings are grey.
