= Carodista gracilis =

Scientific classification
- Kingdom: Animalia
- Phylum: Arthropoda
- Clade: Pancrustacea
- Class: Insecta
- Order: Lepidoptera
- Family: Lecithoceridae
- Genus: Carodista
- Species: C. gracilis

Binomial name
- Carodista gracilis (Gozmány, 1978)

Synonyms
- Catacreaga gracilis Meyrick, 1910

Species of moth

Carodista gracilis is a moth in the family Lecithoceridae. It was described by László Anthony Gozmány in 1978. It is found in Afghanistan.
