= Torodora moriyasu =

Scientific classification
- Kingdom: Animalia
- Phylum: Arthropoda
- Clade: Pancrustacea
- Class: Insecta
- Order: Lepidoptera
- Family: Lecithoceridae
- Genus: Torodora
- Species: T. moriyasu

Binomial name
- Torodora moriyasu Park, 2002

Species of moth

Torodora moriyasu is a moth in the family Lecithoceridae. It was described by Kyu-Tek Park in 2002. It is found in Thailand.

The wingspan is 14–15 mm.

== Etymology ==
The species is named in honour of Dr. S. Moriuti and Dr. Y. Yoshiyasu.
