= Heteralcis bathroptila =

Scientific classification
- Domain: Eukaryota
- Kingdom: Animalia
- Phylum: Arthropoda
- Class: Insecta
- Order: Lepidoptera
- Family: Lecithoceridae
- Genus: Heteralcis
- Species: H. bathroptila

Binomial name
- Heteralcis bathroptila (Meyrick, 1929)

Synonyms
- Carodista bathroptila Meyrick, 1929; Homaloxestis bathroptila Meyrick, 1929; Catacreagra bathroptila Meyrick, 1929

Species of moth

Heteralcis bathroptila is a moth in the family Lecithoceridae. It was described by Edward Meyrick in 1929. It is found in Assam, India.

The wingspan is about 12 mm.
