= Torodora flavescens =

Scientific classification
- Kingdom: Animalia
- Phylum: Arthropoda
- Clade: Pancrustacea
- Class: Insecta
- Order: Lepidoptera
- Family: Lecithoceridae
- Genus: Torodora
- Species: T. flavescens

Binomial name
- Torodora flavescens (Gozmány, 1978)

Synonyms
- Toxotarca flavescens Gozmány, 1978

Species of moth

Torodora flavescens is a moth in the family Lecithoceridae. It was described by László Anthony Gozmány in 1978. It is found in southern China and Thailand.

The wingspan is 14–15 mm.
