= Torodora characteris =

Scientific classification
- Kingdom: Animalia
- Phylum: Arthropoda
- Class: Insecta
- Order: Lepidoptera
- Family: Lecithoceridae
- Genus: Torodora
- Species: T. characteris

Binomial name
- Torodora characteris Meyrick, 1894

Species of moth

Torodora characteris is a moth in the family Lecithoceridae. It was described by Edward Meyrick in 1894. It is found in Burma.

The wingspan is 18–22 mm. The forewings are rather dark fuscous with a rather irregular black spot or small blotch on the submedian fold before one-third of the wing, connected with the inner margin by an indistinct darker suffusion. There is a small transverse black spot in the disc beyond the middle and a faintly indicated slightly bent pale transverse line about four-fifths. The hindwings are rather light fuscous.
