= Carodista isomila =

Scientific classification
- Kingdom: Animalia
- Phylum: Arthropoda
- Class: Insecta
- Order: Lepidoptera
- Family: Lecithoceridae
- Genus: Carodista
- Species: C. isomila

Binomial name
- Carodista isomila (Meyrick, 1911)

Synonyms
- Brachmia isomila Meyrick, 1911; Torodora isomila (Meyrick, 1911)

Species of moth

Carodista isomila is a moth in the family Lecithoceridae. It was described by Edward Meyrick in 1911. It is found in Sri Lanka.

The wingspan is 20–22 mm. The forewings are dark bronzy fuscous. The stigmata are obscurely darker, the plical slightly beyond the first discal, the second discal forming a transverse-linear mark. The hindwings are fuscous.
