= Torodora capillaris =

Scientific classification
- Kingdom: Animalia
- Phylum: Arthropoda
- Clade: Pancrustacea
- Class: Insecta
- Order: Lepidoptera
- Family: Lecithoceridae
- Genus: Torodora
- Species: T. capillaris

Binomial name
- Torodora capillaris Park & Heppner, 2000

Species of moth

Torodora capillaris is a moth in the family Lecithoceridae first described by Kyu-Tek Park and John B. Heppner in 2000. It is found in Taiwan.

The wingspan is 15.5–16 mm.
