= Trichromia occidentalis =

Scientific classification
- Domain: Eukaryota
- Kingdom: Animalia
- Phylum: Arthropoda
- Class: Insecta
- Order: Lepidoptera
- Superfamily: Noctuoidea
- Family: Erebidae
- Subfamily: Arctiinae
- Genus: Trichromia
- Species: T. occidentalis

Binomial name
- Trichromia occidentalis (Rothschild, 1909)

Synonyms
- Paranerita occidentalis Rothschild, 1909; Paranerita occidentalis roseola Watson & Goodger, 1986; Paranerita occidentalis rosacea Rothschild, 1909 (preocc. Rothschild, 1909)

Species of moth

Trichromia occidentalis is a moth in the subfamily Arctiinae. It was described by Walter Rothschild in 1909. It is found in French Guiana, Ecuador and the Brazilian state of Amazonas.

== Subspecies ==
- Trichromia occidentalis occidentalis
- Trichromia occidentalis roseola (Watson & Goodger, 1986)
