= Tetanops flavescens =

Scientific classification
- Kingdom: Animalia
- Phylum: Arthropoda
- Class: Insecta
- Order: Diptera
- Family: Ulidiidae
- Genus: Tetanops
- Species: T. flavescens

Binomial name
- Tetanops flavescens Macquart, 1835

Species of fly

Tetanops flavescens is a species of picture-winged fly in the genus Tetanops of the family Ulidiidae.
