= List of moths of Australia (Lecithoceridae) =

Partial list of Australian moths

This is a list of the Australian moth species of the family Lecithoceridae. It also acts as an index to the species articles and forms part of the full List of moths of Australia.

- Achoria inopina Meyrick, 1904
- Cophomantella lychnocentra (Meyrick, 1904)
- Crocanthes acroxantha Lower, 1896
- Crocanthes characotis Meyrick, 1916
- Crocanthes chordotona Meyrick, 1916
- Crocanthes diula Meyrick, 1904
- Crocanthes doliopa Meyrick, 1921
- Crocanthes epitherma Lower, 1896
- Crocanthes glycina Meyrick, 1904
- Crocanthes halurga Meyrick, 1904
- Crocanthes micradelpha (Lower, 1897)
- Crocanthes pancala (Turner, 1919)
- Crocanthes perigrapta Meyrick, 1904
- Crocanthes prasinopis Meyrick, 1886
- Crocanthes sidonia Meyrick, 1910
- Crocanthes thermobapta Lower, 1920
- Crocanthes thiomorpha Turner, 1933
- Crocanthes trizona Lower, 1916
- Crocanthes venustula Turner, 1933
- Crocanthes zonias Meyrick, 1904
- Crocanthes zonodesma Lower, 1900
- Lecithocera absumptella (Walker, 1864)
- Lecithocera alampes Turner, 1919
- Lecithocera anympha Meyrick, 1916
- Lecithocera chamela Turner, 1919
- Lecithocera concinna (Turner, 1919)
- Lecithocera cyamitis (Meyrick, 1904)
- Lecithocera eumenopis Meyrick, 1914
- Lecithocera imprudens Meyrick, 1914
- Lecithocera isophanes (Turner, 1919)
- Lecithocera linocoma Meyrick, 1916
- Lecithocera micromela (Lower, 1897)
- Lecithocera noseropa (Turner, 1919)
- Lecithocera poliocoma Meyrick, 1916
- Lecithocera sobria (Meyrick, 1904)
- Lecithocera terrena (Turner, 1919)
- Lecithocera terrigena (Meyrick, 1904)
- Oecia oecophila (Staudinger, 1876)
- Protolychnis trigonias (Meyrick, 1904)
- Sarisophora brachymita (Turner, 1919)
- Sarisophora chlaenota Meyrick, 1904
- Sarisophora cyclonitis (Meyrick, 1904)
- Sarisophora dispila (Turner, 1919)
- Sarisophora leptoglypta Meyrick, 1904
- Sarisophora leucoscia Turner, 1919
- Sarisophora nyctiphylax Turner, 1919
- Sarisophora pycnospila Turner, 1919
- Sarisophora tenella Turner, 1919
- Sisyrodonta ochrosidera Meyrick, 1922
