= Crocanthes celema =

Scientific classification
- Kingdom: Animalia
- Phylum: Arthropoda
- Clade: Pancrustacea
- Class: Insecta
- Order: Lepidoptera
- Family: Lecithoceridae
- Genus: Crocanthes
- Species: C. celema

Binomial name
- Crocanthes celema Durrant, 1915

Species of moth

Crocanthes celema is a moth in the family Lecithoceridae. It was described by John Hartley Durrant in 1915. It is found on New Guinea.

The wingspan is about 14 mm (0.55 in). The forewings are purplish ferruginous, with a conspicuous canary-yellow triangular patch on the middle of the costa, reaching to beyond the cubitus. The yellow colouring is continued narrowly along the costa and termen to the tornus, expanding into a second costal triangle before the apex. The hindwings are shining, ochraceous.
