= Crocanthes crypsichola =

Scientific classification
- Kingdom: Animalia
- Phylum: Arthropoda
- Clade: Pancrustacea
- Class: Insecta
- Order: Lepidoptera
- Family: Lecithoceridae
- Genus: Crocanthes
- Species: C. crypsichola

Binomial name
- Crocanthes crypsichola Durrant, 1915

Species of moth

Crocanthes crypsichola is a moth in the family Lecithoceridae. It was described by John Hartley Durrant in 1915. It is found on New Guinea.

The wingspan is about 20 mm (0.79 in). The forewings are shining, purplish fuscous, with a narrow, outwardly oblique, pale primrose-yellow fascia crossing the wing from the middle of the costa almost to the dorsum, and with a small triangular costal spot of the same color before the apex. The hindwings are fuscous.
