= Pacificulla miltina =

Scientific classification
- Domain: Eukaryota
- Kingdom: Animalia
- Phylum: Arthropoda
- Class: Insecta
- Order: Lepidoptera
- Family: Lecithoceridae
- Genus: Pacificulla
- Species: P. miltina

Binomial name
- Pacificulla miltina (Durrant, 1915)

Synonyms
- Crocanthes miltina Durrant, 1915

Species of moth

Pacificulla miltina is a moth in the family Lecithoceridae. It was described by John Hartley Durrant in 1915. It is endemic to New Guinea.

Its wingspan is 24–26 millimetres (0.94–1.02 in). Its forewings are black, with a large triangular orange spot on the dorsum beyond the middle, its apex toward the costa, from which it is narrowly separated by the ground colour, its inner side leaving the dorsum at an angle of about 45°, and its outer margin somewhat curved to the dorsum before the tornus. The hindwings are black, with a broad orange fascia on the median third of the wing, its inner edge continuous with that of the patch on the forewing, a small projection upward in the cell encroaching on the black basal area. The outer margin of the orange fascia is somewhat sinuate, the fascia being narrowed below the cell and toward the costa, where it is scarcely more than half the width of the patch on the forewing.
