= Lecithocera deloma =

Scientific classification
- Domain: Eukaryota
- Kingdom: Animalia
- Phylum: Arthropoda
- Class: Insecta
- Order: Lepidoptera
- Family: Lecithoceridae
- Genus: Lecithocera
- Species: L. deloma

Binomial name
- Lecithocera deloma Durrant, 1915

Species of moth in the genus Lecithocera

Lecithocera deloma is a moth in the family Lecithoceridae. It was described by John Hartley Durrant in 1915. It is found on New Guinea.

The wingspan is about 15 mm. The forewings are leaden grey with a narrow whitish ochreous costal stripe from the base to the apex. The hindwings are cinereous (ash grey).
