= Antaeotricha zelleri =

Scientific classification
- Domain: Eukaryota
- Kingdom: Animalia
- Phylum: Arthropoda
- Class: Insecta
- Order: Lepidoptera
- Family: Depressariidae
- Genus: Antaeotricha
- Species: A. zelleri

Binomial name
- Antaeotricha zelleri (Walsingham & Durrant, 1896)

Synonyms
- zelleri Walsingham & Durrant, 1896; Stenoma fumipennis Busck, 1914

Species of moth

Antaeotricha zelleri is a moth in the family Depressariidae. It was described by Lord Walsingham and John Hartley Durrant in 1896. It is found in Panama, Costa Rica, French Guiana and Brazil.

The wingspan is 22–25 mm. The forewings are dark grey with a small, triangular, whitish ochreous spot just before the middle of costa which is bordered by two ill-defined, dark green, metallic spots. The dorsal part of the wing below the fold is strongly suffused with dark green metallic scales. At the end of the cell is a whitish ochreous, ill-defined cloud with a small green center, from which a metallic green spur runs down to the end of the fold. At the apical third and just before the terminal edge are two faint, whitish lines across the wing. The dark space between these lines is strongly suffused with green metallic scales. The entire wing when looked at toward the light is brilliant iridescent green, while away from the light the gray appears dull and the green appears blackish. The hindwings are blackish fuscous.
