= Lecithocera strigosa =

Scientific classification
- Domain: Eukaryota
- Kingdom: Animalia
- Phylum: Arthropoda
- Class: Insecta
- Order: Lepidoptera
- Family: Lecithoceridae
- Genus: Lecithocera
- Species: L. strigosa

Binomial name
- Lecithocera strigosa Durrant, 1915

Species of moth in the genus Lecithocera

Lecithocera strigosa is a moth in the family Lecithoceridae. It was described by John Hartley Durrant in 1915. It is found on New Guinea.

The wingspan is about 11.5 mm. The forewings are whitish ochreous, with an oblique fuscous-black streak, commencing on the radius near its base and then extending along the fold to the dorsum, but becoming linear from the end of the cell. There is a rather large and conspicuous fuscous-black discal spot, followed by sparse fuscous suffusion extending to the termen which is narrowly dark fuscous black, with three slight inward projections. The hindwings are pale fuscous, a slender ochreous line at the base of the cilia.
