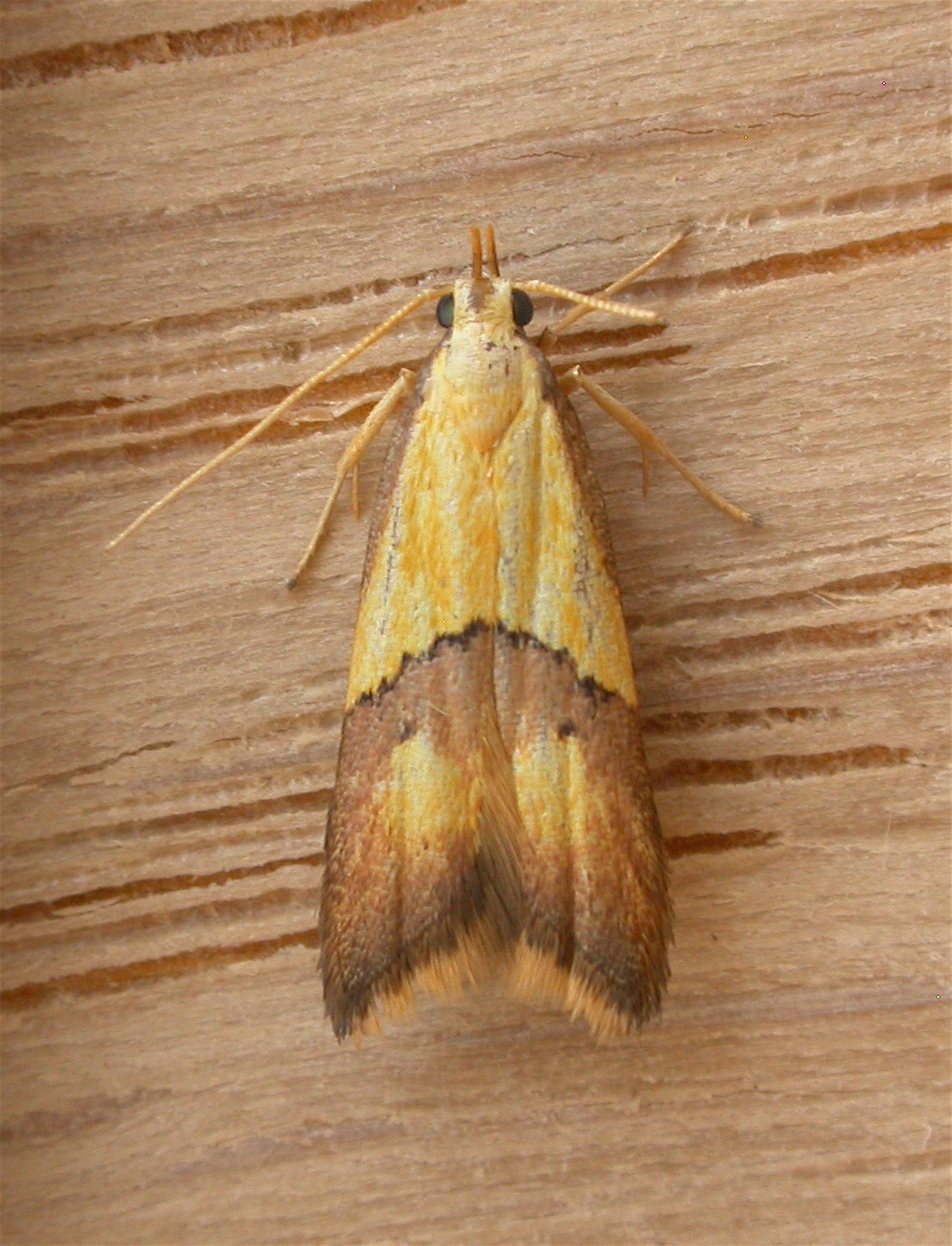
- Crocanthes glycina

Scientific classification
- Kingdom: Animalia
- Phylum: Arthropoda
- Class: Insecta
- Order: Lepidoptera
- Family: Lecithoceridae
- Genus: Crocanthes; Meyrick, 1886

Synonyms
- Aprosoesta Turner, 1919; Aposoesta Turner, 1924

= Crocanthes =

Genus of moths

Crocanthes is a genus of moths in the family Lecithoceridae.

== Species ==
- Crocanthes acroxantha Lower, 1896
- Crocanthes carcharias Meyrick, 1910
- Crocanthes celema Durrant, 1915
- Crocanthes characotis Meyrick, 1916
- Crocanthes chordotona Meyrick, 1916
- Crocanthes cleomorpha Meyrick, 1931
- Crocanthes crypsichola Durrant, 1915
- Crocanthes cyclopsana Park, 2011
- Crocanthes diula Meyrick, 1904
- Crocanthes doliopa Meyrick, 1921
- Crocanthes epitherma Lower, 1896
- Crocanthes eurypyra Meyrick, 1918
- Crocanthes fallax Durrant, 1915
- Crocanthes gatoralis Park, 2011
- Crocanthes gelastis Meyrick, 1918
- Crocanthes glycina Meyrick, 1904
- Crocanthes halurga Meyrick, 1904
- Crocanthes hecuba Meyrick, 1931
- Crocanthes heliocharis Diakonoff, 1954
- Crocanthes heliograpta Meyrick, 1929
- Crocanthes hemipyra Meyrick, 1938
- Crocanthes ignea Meyrick, 1925
- Crocanthes leucodonta Diakonoff, 1954
- Crocanthes megalophthalma Diakonoff, 1954
- Crocanthes micradelpha (Lower, 1897)
- Crocanthes monodesma Meyrick, 1931
- Crocanthes pancala (Turner, 1919)
- Crocanthes perigrapta Meyrick, 1904
- Crocanthes phaeograpta Meyrick, 1931
- Crocanthes phoenoteles Meyrick, 1929
- Crocanthes platycitra Meyrick, 1931
- Crocanthes poliozona Park, 2011
- Crocanthes prasinopis Meyrick, 1886
- Crocanthes protoma Diakonoff, 1954
- Crocanthes pyrochorda (Meyrick, 1910)
- Crocanthes pyrostola Diakonoff, 1954
- Crocanthes rhodantha Meyrick, 1918
- Crocanthes sceletopa Meyrick, 1910
- Crocanthes sceptrophora Diakonoff, 1954
- Crocanthes scioxantha Meyrick, 1910
- Crocanthes sidonia Meyrick, 1910
- Crocanthes sphecotypa Meyrick, 1933
- Crocanthes symmochlopa Meyrick, 1929
- Crocanthes temeraria Meyrick, 1910
- Crocanthes thalamectis Meyrick, 1929
- Crocanthes thermobapta Lower, 1920
- Crocanthes thermocharis Meyrick, 1931
- Crocanthes thiomorpha Turner, 1933
- Crocanthes triglenopa Meyrick, 1929
- Crocanthes trizona Lower, 1916
- Crocanthes venustula Turner, 1933
- Crocanthes warmarensis Park, 2011
- Crocanthes xanthistia Meyrick, 1931
- Crocanthes zonodesma Lower, 1900

== Former species ==
- Crocanthes zonias Meyrick, 1904
