= L. concinna =

L. concinna may refer to:

- Lasia concinna, a flowering plant
- Lasiodothiorella concinna, a sac fungus
- Lecithocera concinna, a long-horned moth
- Leiopleura concinna, a jewel beetle
- Leiostyla concinna, a land snail
- Livistona concinna, a fan palm
