= Crocanthes monodesma =

Scientific classification
- Kingdom: Animalia
- Phylum: Arthropoda
- Clade: Pancrustacea
- Class: Insecta
- Order: Lepidoptera
- Family: Lecithoceridae
- Genus: Crocanthes
- Species: C. monodesma

Binomial name
- Crocanthes monodesma Meyrick, 1931

Species of moth

Crocanthes monodesma is a moth in the family Lecithoceridae. It was described by Edward Meyrick in 1931. It is found on New Guinea. Lepidoptera and Some Other Life Forms gives this name as a synonym of Crocanthes fallax Durrant, 1915.
