= Sarisophora lygrophthalma =

Scientific classification
- Kingdom: Animalia
- Phylum: Arthropoda
- Class: Insecta
- Order: Lepidoptera
- Family: Lecithoceridae
- Genus: Sarisophora
- Species: S. lygrophthalma

Binomial name
- Sarisophora lygrophthalma Meyrick, 1934

Species of moth

Sarisophora lygrophthalma is a moth in the family Lecithoceridae. It was described by Edward Meyrick in 1934. It is found in China.
