= Pacificulla thrasydora =

Scientific classification
- Domain: Eukaryota
- Kingdom: Animalia
- Phylum: Arthropoda
- Class: Insecta
- Order: Lepidoptera
- Family: Lecithoceridae
- Genus: Pacificulla
- Species: P. thrasydora

Binomial name
- Pacificulla thrasydora (Meyrick, 1910)

Synonyms
- Crocanthes thrasydora Meyrick, 1910

Species of moth

Pacificulla thrasydora is a moth in the family Lecithoceridae. It was described by Edward Meyrick in 1910. It is endemic to New Guinea.

The wingspan is about 23 millimetres (0.91 in). The forewings are purplish black with a broad orange fascia rising from the dorsum beyond the middle and running towards three-fourths of the costa but not reaching it. The hindwings are purplish black with a broad orange fascia from the middle of the costa to the outer half of the dorsum, occupying the median third of the wing.
