= Crocanthes gelastis =

Scientific classification
- Kingdom: Animalia
- Phylum: Arthropoda
- Clade: Pancrustacea
- Class: Insecta
- Order: Lepidoptera
- Family: Lecithoceridae
- Genus: Crocanthes
- Species: C. gelastis

Binomial name
- Crocanthes gelastis Meyrick, 1918

Species of moth

Crocanthes gelastis is a moth in the family Lecithoceridae. It was described by Edward Meyrick in 1918. It is found on New Guinea.

The wingspan is about 17 mm (0.67 in). The forewings are dark purple fuscous with an irregular transverse deep yellow spot crossing the end of the cell, not reaching the costa or dorsum. The hindwings are dark fuscous with a rather broad rather irregular deep yellow fascia from somewhat beyond the middle of the costa to the termen above the tornus.
