= Crocanthes sceletopa =

Scientific classification
- Kingdom: Animalia
- Phylum: Arthropoda
- Clade: Pancrustacea
- Class: Insecta
- Order: Lepidoptera
- Family: Lecithoceridae
- Genus: Crocanthes
- Species: C. sceletopa

Binomial name
- Crocanthes sceletopa Meyrick, 1910

Species of moth

Crocanthes sceletopa is a moth in the family Lecithoceridae. It was described by Edward Meyrick in 1910. It is found on the Maluku Islands in Indonesia.

The wingspan is 9–10 mm (0.35–0.39 in). The forewings are dark fuscous with two rather oblique wedge-shaped whitish-ochreous spots from the costa posteriorly, reaching half way across the wing. The hindwings are blackish fuscous with cloudy light fuscous suffused transverse streaks before and beyond the middle, the second indented in the middle. There is a sharply defined sub-metallic prismatic-fuscous streak from four-fifths of the costa to below the apex and continued along the termen to the middle.
