= Sarisophora ptochomorpha =

Scientific classification
- Kingdom: Animalia
- Phylum: Arthropoda
- Class: Insecta
- Order: Lepidoptera
- Family: Lecithoceridae
- Genus: Sarisophora
- Species: S. ptochomorpha

Binomial name
- Sarisophora ptochomorpha Meyrick, 1923

Species of moth

Sarisophora ptochomorpha is a moth in the family Lecithoceridae. It was described by Edward Meyrick in 1923. It is found on Cyprus.

The wingspan is about 14 mm. The forewings are grey suffusedly mixed with dark violet fuscous and with the discal stigmata obscurely darker. The hindwings are rather dark grey.
