= Pacificulla flaviagra =

Scientific classification
- Kingdom: Animalia
- Phylum: Arthropoda
- Clade: Pancrustacea
- Class: Insecta
- Order: Lepidoptera
- Family: Lecithoceridae
- Genus: Pacificulla
- Species: P. flaviagra

Binomial name
- Pacificulla flaviagra Park, 2013

Species of moth

Pacificulla flaviagra is a moth in the family Lecithoceridae. It was described by Kyu-Tek Park in 2013. It is found in Papua New Guinea.
