= Sarisophora pyrrhotata =

Scientific classification
- Kingdom: Animalia
- Phylum: Arthropoda
- Clade: Pancrustacea
- Class: Insecta
- Order: Lepidoptera
- Family: Lecithoceridae
- Genus: Sarisophora
- Species: S. pyrrhotata

Binomial name
- Sarisophora pyrrhotata Park, 2012

Species of moth

Sarisophora pyrrhotata is a moth in the family Lecithoceridae. It was described by Kyu-Tek Park in 2012. It is found in Papua New Guinea.
