= Crocanthes carcharias =

Scientific classification
- Kingdom: Animalia
- Phylum: Arthropoda
- Clade: Pancrustacea
- Class: Insecta
- Order: Lepidoptera
- Family: Lecithoceridae
- Genus: Crocanthes
- Species: C. carcharias

Binomial name
- Crocanthes carcharias Meyrick, 1910

Synonyms
- Pacificulla carcharias (Meyrick, 1910)

Species of moth

Crocanthes carcharias is a moth in the family Lecithoceridae. It was described by Edward Meyrick in 1910. It is found on New Guinea.

The wingspan is about 25 mm (0.98 in). The forewings are purple black with a large irregular-edged orange patch crossing the wing beyond the middle, suffusedly connected with the costa but separated from the dorsum by a slender streak of ground colour, containing a small transverse-oval purple-black spot (the second discal stigma) near its anterior edge in the middle. The hindwings are orange, with the base narrowly black. There is an irregular purple-black streak along the termen, forming a triangular spot at the apex, with a long triangular projection above the middle reaching the middle of the disc, and a shorter sub-triangular projection below the middle.
