= Crocanthes fallax =

Scientific classification
- Kingdom: Animalia
- Phylum: Arthropoda
- Clade: Pancrustacea
- Class: Insecta
- Order: Lepidoptera
- Family: Lecithoceridae
- Genus: Crocanthes
- Species: C. fallax

Binomial name
- Crocanthes fallax Durrant, 1915

Species of moth

Crocanthes fallax is a moth in the family Lecithoceridae. It was described by John Hartley Durrant in 1915. It is found on New Guinea.

The wingspan is about 22 mm (0.87 in). The forewings are shining, purplish fuscous, with a narrow, outwardly oblique, pale primrose-yellow fascia crossing the wing from the middle of the costa almost to the dorsum, and with a minute dull ochreous, triangular, costal spot before the apex. The hindwings are purplish fuscous.
