= Sarisophora praecentrix =

Scientific classification
- Kingdom: Animalia
- Phylum: Arthropoda
- Class: Insecta
- Order: Lepidoptera
- Family: Lecithoceridae
- Genus: Sarisophora
- Species: S. praecentrix

Binomial name
- Sarisophora praecentrix Meyrick, 1931

Species of moth

Sarisophora praecentrix is a moth in the family Lecithoceridae. It was described by Edward Meyrick in 1931. It is found on New Guinea.
