= Sarisophora tamiodes =

Scientific classification
- Kingdom: Animalia
- Phylum: Arthropoda
- Class: Insecta
- Order: Lepidoptera
- Family: Lecithoceridae
- Genus: Sarisophora
- Species: S. tamiodes

Binomial name
- Sarisophora tamiodes Meyrick, 1910

Species of moth

Sarisophora tamiodes is a moth in the family Lecithoceridae. It was described by Edward Meyrick in 1910. It is found on New Guinea.

The wingspan is 13–14 mm. The forewings are deep ochreous yellow, with some scattered dark fuscous scales, especially posteriorly. The discal stigmata are dark fuscous, from the second a more or less marked dark fuscous line runs directly towards the dorsum but not reaching it. The hindwings in males are pale ochreous yellowish, deeper towards the apex, slightly fuscous tinged on the tornal area. The hindwings of the females are grey, the apex yellow tinged.
