= Protolychnis =

Scientific classification
- Kingdom: Animalia
- Phylum: Arthropoda
- Class: Insecta
- Order: Lepidoptera
- Family: Lecithoceridae
- Subfamily: Lecithocerinae
- Genus: Protolychnis; Meyrick, 1925

Type species
- Protolychnis maculata (Walsingham, 1881)

Genus of moths

Protolychnis is a genus of moth in the family Lecithoceridae.

== Species ==
- Protolychnis bastini Park, 2020
- Protolychnis chlorotoma (Meyrick, 1914)
- Protolychnis ipnosa Wu, 1994
- Protolychnis maculata (Walsingham, 1881)
- Protolychnis marginata (Walsingham, 1891)
- Protolychnis morogorensi Park & Koo, 2021
- Protolychnis natalensis Park & De Prins, 2019
- Protolychnis oculiella Park & Koo, 2021
- Protolychnis petiliella Park, 2020
- Protolychnis trigonias (Meyrick, 1904)
