= Crocanthes ignea =

Scientific classification
- Kingdom: Animalia
- Phylum: Arthropoda
- Clade: Pancrustacea
- Class: Insecta
- Order: Lepidoptera
- Family: Lecithoceridae
- Genus: Crocanthes
- Species: C. ignea

Binomial name
- Crocanthes ignea Meyrick, 1925

Synonyms
- Pacificulla ignea (Meyrick, 1925)

Species of moth

Crocanthes ignea is a moth in the family Lecithoceridae. It was described by Edward Meyrick in 1925. It is found on New Guinea.
