= Pacificulla philotima =

Scientific classification
- Domain: Eukaryota
- Kingdom: Animalia
- Phylum: Arthropoda
- Class: Insecta
- Order: Lepidoptera
- Family: Lecithoceridae
- Genus: Pacificulla
- Species: P. philotima

Binomial name
- Pacificulla philotima (Diakonoff, 1954)

Synonyms
- Crocanthes philotima Diakonoff, 1954; Pacificulla philotima Park, 2013

Species of moth

Pacificulla philotima is a moth in the family Lecithoceridae. It was described by Alexey Diakonoff in 1954. It is endemic to New Guinea.
