= Crocanthes heliograpta =

Scientific classification
- Kingdom: Animalia
- Phylum: Arthropoda
- Clade: Pancrustacea
- Class: Insecta
- Order: Lepidoptera
- Family: Lecithoceridae
- Genus: Crocanthes
- Species: C. heliograpta

Binomial name
- Crocanthes heliograpta Meyrick, 1929

Synonyms
- Aprosoesta heliograpta (Meyrick, 1929)

Species of moth

Crocanthes heliograpta is a moth in the family Lecithoceridae. It was described by Edward Meyrick in 1929. It is found on New Guinea.
