= Pacificulla =

Scientific classification
- Domain: Eukaryota
- Kingdom: Animalia
- Phylum: Arthropoda
- Class: Insecta
- Order: Lepidoptera
- Family: Lecithoceridae
- Genus: Pacificulla; Park in Park & Lee, 2013

Genus of moths

Pacificulla is a genus of moths in the family Lecithoceridae. The genus was described by Park in 2013.

== Species ==
- Pacificulla callisomata Park, 2013
- Pacificulla cervicalis Park, 2013
- Pacificulla esdiparki Park, 2013
- Pacificulla flaviagra Park, 2013
- Pacificulla geniola (Meyrick, 1931)
- Pacificulla ignigera (Meyrick, 1938)
- Pacificulla kekamatana Park, 2013
- Pacificulla miltina (Durrant, 1915)
- Pacificulla searsi Park, 2013
- Pacificulla thrasydora (Meyrick, 1910)
- Pacificulla philotima (Diakonoff, 1954)
- Pacificulla zonias (Meyrick, 1904)
