= Crocanthes poliozona =

Scientific classification
- Kingdom: Animalia
- Phylum: Arthropoda
- Clade: Pancrustacea
- Class: Insecta
- Order: Lepidoptera
- Family: Lecithoceridae
- Genus: Crocanthes
- Species: C. poliozona

Binomial name
- Crocanthes poliozona Park, 2011

Synonyms
- Aprosoesta poliozona (Park, 2011)

Species of moth

Crocanthes poliozona is a moth in the family Lecithoceridae. It was described by Kyu-Tek Park in 2011. It is found in Papua New Guinea.

The wingspan is 13–15 mm (0.51–0.59 in).
