= Crocanthes thermocharis =

Scientific classification
- Kingdom: Animalia
- Phylum: Arthropoda
- Clade: Pancrustacea
- Class: Insecta
- Order: Lepidoptera
- Family: Lecithoceridae
- Genus: Crocanthes
- Species: C. thermocharis

Binomial name
- Crocanthes thermocharis Meyrick, 1931

Species of moth

Crocanthes thermocharis is a moth in the family Lecithoceridae. It was described by Edward Meyrick in 1931. It is found on New Guinea.
