= Pacificulla geniola =

Scientific classification
- Kingdom: Animalia
- Phylum: Arthropoda
- Class: Insecta
- Order: Lepidoptera
- Family: Lecithoceridae
- Genus: Pacificulla
- Species: P. geniola

Binomial name
- Pacificulla geniola (Meyrick, 1931)

Synonyms
- Crocanthes geniola Meyrick, 1931

Species of moth

Pacificulla geniola is a moth in the family Lecithoceridae. It was described by Edward Meyrick in 1931. It is found on New Guinea.
