= Sarisophora neptigota =

Scientific classification
- Kingdom: Animalia
- Phylum: Arthropoda
- Clade: Pancrustacea
- Class: Insecta
- Order: Lepidoptera
- Family: Lecithoceridae
- Genus: Sarisophora
- Species: S. neptigota

Binomial name
- Sarisophora neptigota Wu, 1994

Species of moth

Sarisophora neptigota is a moth in the family Lecithoceridae. It was described by Chun-Sheng Wu in 1994. It is found in China.
