= Sarisophora beckerina =

Scientific classification
- Kingdom: Animalia
- Phylum: Arthropoda
- Clade: Pancrustacea
- Class: Insecta
- Order: Lepidoptera
- Family: Lecithoceridae
- Genus: Sarisophora
- Species: S. beckerina

Binomial name
- Sarisophora beckerina Park, 2012

Species of moth

Sarisophora beckerina is a moth in the family Lecithoceridae. It was described by Kyu-Tek Park in 2012, and can be found in Papua New Guinea.
