= Crocanthes temeraria =

Scientific classification
- Kingdom: Animalia
- Phylum: Arthropoda
- Clade: Pancrustacea
- Class: Insecta
- Order: Lepidoptera
- Family: Lecithoceridae
- Genus: Crocanthes
- Species: C. temeraria

Binomial name
- Crocanthes temeraria Meyrick, 1910

Species of moth

Crocanthes temeraria is a moth in the family Lecithoceridae. It was described by Edward Meyrick in 1910. It is found on New Guinea.

The wingspan is about 18 mm (0.71 in). The forewings are crimson, the dorsal two-thirds from one-fourth to the termen suffused with purplish grey, extended indefinitely to the costa at two-fifths and four-fifths, an irregular yellow-whitish spot towards the dorsum before one-fourth and a moderate subquadrate yellow-whitish spot in the middle of the disc. The costal edge is yellow from two-fifths to three-fourths, and more widely suffused with deep yellow from four-fifths to the apex. The hindwings are pale yellowish tinged throughout with crimson.
