= Crocanthes symmochlopa =

Scientific classification
- Kingdom: Animalia
- Phylum: Arthropoda
- Clade: Pancrustacea
- Class: Insecta
- Order: Lepidoptera
- Family: Lecithoceridae
- Genus: Crocanthes
- Species: C. symmochlopa

Binomial name
- Crocanthes symmochlopa Meyrick, 1929

Synonyms
- Crocanthes triglenopa Meyrick, 1929

Species of moth

Crocanthes symmochlopa is a moth in the family Lecithoceridae. It was described by Edward Meyrick in 1929. It is found in the Bismarck Archipelago (Papua New Guinea) on New Ireland and New Hanover Islands. The former is the type locality of Crocanthes symmochlopa whereas the latter is the type locality of Crocanthes triglenopa, which is considered synonym of Crocanthes symmochlopa in some but not all sources.

The wingspan is 12–13 mm (0.47–0.51 in).
