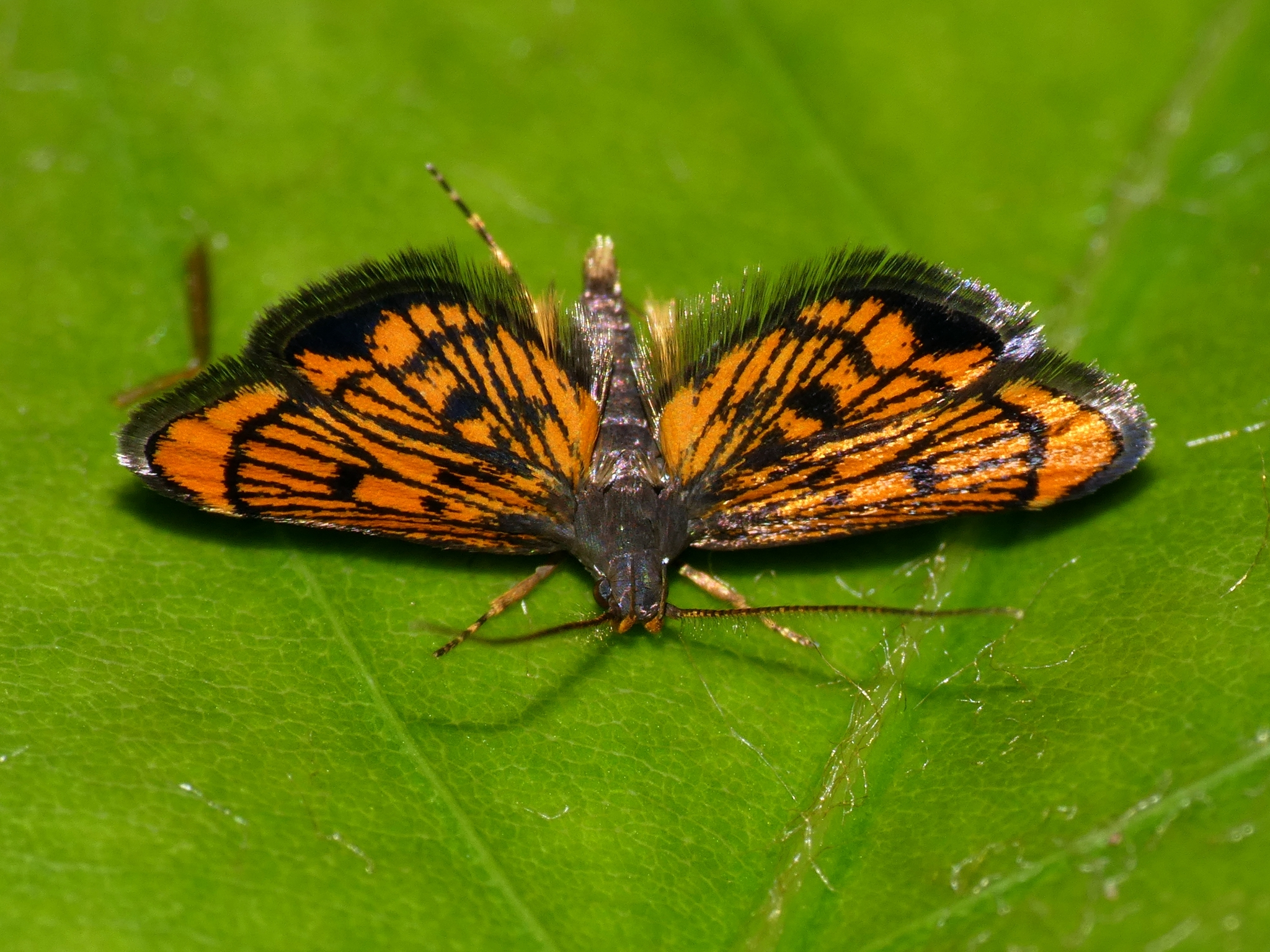

Scientific classification
- Kingdom: Animalia
- Phylum: Arthropoda
- Clade: Pancrustacea
- Class: Insecta
- Order: Lepidoptera
- Family: Lecithoceridae
- Genus: Crocanthes
- Species: C. pyrochorda

Binomial name
- Crocanthes pyrochorda (Meyrick, 1910)

Synonyms
- Gonaepa pyrochorda Meyrick, 1910

= Crocanthes pyrochorda =

Species of moth

Crocanthes pyrochorda is a moth in the family Lecithoceridae. It was described by Edward Meyrick in 1910. It is found on New Guinea.

The wingspan is 12–14 mm (0.47–0.55 in). The forewings are deep reddish orange with the costal and dorsal edge and all veins marked by fine black lines, all terminated by a rather curved black transverse line from the costa before three-fourths to the dorsum before the tornus. The discal stigmata are represented by small black spots and there is a black marginal line around the posterior fourth of the costa and termen to near the tornus. The hindwings are deep reddish orange, with all veins marked throughout with fine black lines. There is a black discal spot on the end of the cell and a rather irregular black line from four-fifths of the costa to below the middle of the termen, indented in the middle. A slender irregular black streak is found along the upper half of the termen.
