= Pacificulla ignigera =

Scientific classification
- Domain: Eukaryota
- Kingdom: Animalia
- Phylum: Arthropoda
- Class: Insecta
- Order: Lepidoptera
- Family: Lecithoceridae
- Genus: Pacificulla
- Species: P. ignigera

Binomial name
- Pacificulla ignigera (Meyrick, 1938)

Synonyms
- Crocanthes ignigera Meyrick, 1938

Species of moth

Pacificulla ignigera is a moth in the family Lecithoceridae. It was described by Edward Meyrick in 1938. It is endemic to New Guinea.
