= Protolychnis maculata =

Scientific classification
- Domain: Eukaryota
- Kingdom: Animalia
- Phylum: Arthropoda
- Class: Insecta
- Order: Lepidoptera
- Family: Lecithoceridae
- Genus: Protolychnis
- Species: P. maculata

Binomial name
- Protolychnis maculata (Walsingham, 1881)

Synonyms
- Lecithocera maculata Walsingham, 1881

Species of moth

Protolychnis maculata is a moth in the family Lecithoceridae. It was described by Thomas de Grey, 6th Baron Walsingham, in 1881. It is found in the Democratic Republic of Congo (Orientale), Namibia, South Africa, Tanzania and Zimbabwe.

The wingspan is about 13 mm. The forewings are fuscous, slightly shining, and with a purplish tinge. There is a small faint ochreous discal spot on the outer edge of the basal third and a larger roundish faint ochreous spot at the end of the cell, and another less conspicuous spot of the same colour (sometimes scarcely visible) on the costal margin above and beyond it, from which an outwardly angulated line of very faint ochreous scales crosses the wing to the dorsal margin. The hindwings are fuscous, slightly paler than the forewings.
