= Crocanthes eurypyra =

Scientific classification
- Kingdom: Animalia
- Phylum: Arthropoda
- Clade: Pancrustacea
- Class: Insecta
- Order: Lepidoptera
- Family: Lecithoceridae
- Genus: Crocanthes
- Species: C. eurypyra

Binomial name
- Crocanthes eurypyra Meyrick, 1918

Synonyms
- Pacificulla eurypyra (Meyrick, 1918)

Species of moth

Crocanthes eurypyra is a moth in the family Lecithoceridae. It was described by Edward Meyrick in 1918. It is found on New Guinea.

The wingspan is about 16 mm (0.63 in). The forewings are orange with dark purple-fuscous markings. There is a basal patch, the outer edge rather convex, running from one-third of the costa to before one-fourth of the dorsum, connected by a slender costal streak with the terminal band. A somewhat pentagonal spot is found in the middle of the disc and a terminal band, with the edge slightly concave, runs from three-fourths of the costa to just before the tornus. The hindwings are orange with dark fuscous markings. There is a small basal patch, hardly extending to one-fifth of the wing and a trapezoidal spot in the disc at two-fifths, broadest above. There is also an apical fascia, broad on the costa, attenuated to below the middle of the termen.
