= Crocanthes hemipyra =

Scientific classification
- Kingdom: Animalia
- Phylum: Arthropoda
- Clade: Pancrustacea
- Class: Insecta
- Order: Lepidoptera
- Family: Lecithoceridae
- Genus: Crocanthes
- Species: C. hemipyra

Binomial name
- Crocanthes hemipyra Meyrick, 1938

Synonyms
- Lamprista hemipyra (Meyrick, 1938)

Species of moth

Crocanthes hemipyra is a moth in the family Lecithoceridae. It was described by Edward Meyrick in 1938. It is found in Papua New Guinea.
