= Crocanthes sceptrophora =

Scientific classification
- Kingdom: Animalia
- Phylum: Arthropoda
- Clade: Pancrustacea
- Class: Insecta
- Order: Lepidoptera
- Family: Lecithoceridae
- Genus: Crocanthes
- Species: C. sceptrophora

Binomial name
- Crocanthes sceptrophora Diakonoff, 1954

Species of moth

Crocanthes sceptrophora is a moth in the family Lecithoceridae. It was described by Alexey Diakonoff in 1954. It is found in New Guinea.
