= Pacificulla searsi =

Scientific classification
- Kingdom: Animalia
- Phylum: Arthropoda
- Clade: Pancrustacea
- Class: Insecta
- Order: Lepidoptera
- Family: Lecithoceridae
- Genus: Pacificulla
- Species: P. searsi

Binomial name
- Pacificulla searsi Park, 2013

Species of moth

Pacificulla searsi is a moth in the family Lecithoceridae. It was described by Kyu-Tek Park in 2013. It is endemic to New Guinea.
