= Crocanthes cyclopsana =

Scientific classification
- Kingdom: Animalia
- Phylum: Arthropoda
- Clade: Pancrustacea
- Class: Insecta
- Order: Lepidoptera
- Family: Lecithoceridae
- Genus: Crocanthes
- Species: C. cyclopsana

Binomial name
- Crocanthes cyclopsana Park, 2011

Synonyms
- Aprosoesta cyclopsana (Park, 2011)

Species of moth

Crocanthes cyclopsana is a moth in the family Lecithoceridae. It was described by Kyu-Tek Park in 2011. It is found in Papua New Guinea.

The wingspan is about 11 mm (0.43 in).
