= Crocanthes rhodantha =

Scientific classification
- Kingdom: Animalia
- Phylum: Arthropoda
- Clade: Pancrustacea
- Class: Insecta
- Order: Lepidoptera
- Family: Lecithoceridae
- Genus: Crocanthes
- Species: C. rhodantha

Binomial name
- Crocanthes rhodantha Meyrick, 1918

Species of moth

Crocanthes rhodantha is a moth in the family Lecithoceridae. It was described by Edward Meyrick in 1918. It is found on New Guinea.

The wingspan is about 16 mm (0.63 in). The forewings are light rosy crimson with an irregular transverse light yellow blotch in the disc before the middle, connected with the costa before the middle by some yellowish suffusion. There is a series of indistinct yellow marks along the apical part of the costa and termen. The hindwings are pale greyish, the apex slightly rosy tinged.
