= Protolychnis chlorotoma =

Scientific classification
- Kingdom: Animalia
- Phylum: Arthropoda
- Class: Insecta
- Order: Lepidoptera
- Family: Lecithoceridae
- Genus: Protolychnis
- Species: P. chlorotoma

Binomial name
- Protolychnis chlorotoma (Meyrick, 1914)

Synonyms
- Onebala chlorotoma Meyrick, 1914

Species of moth

Protolychnis chlorotoma is a moth in the family Lecithoceridae. It was described by Edward Meyrick in 1914. It is found in Malawi.

The wingspan is about 12 mm. The forewings are dark purple-fuscous with a direct transverse whitish-ochreous streak just before the middle, slightly angulated inwards towards the costa. There is a fine series of scattered whitish-ochreous scales from a dot on the costa at four-fifths to the dorsum before the tornus, angulated outwards in the middle. The hindwings are dark grey, lighter in the disc anteriorly.
