= Sarisophora melanotata =

Scientific classification
- Kingdom: Animalia
- Phylum: Arthropoda
- Clade: Pancrustacea
- Class: Insecta
- Order: Lepidoptera
- Family: Lecithoceridae
- Genus: Sarisophora
- Species: S. melanotata

Binomial name
- Sarisophora melanotata Park, 2012

Species of moth

Sarisophora melanotata is a moth in the family Lecithoceridae. It was described by Kyu-Tek Park in 2012. It is found in Papua New Guinea.

== Etymology ==
The species name derived from the Greek word melan, meaning black.
