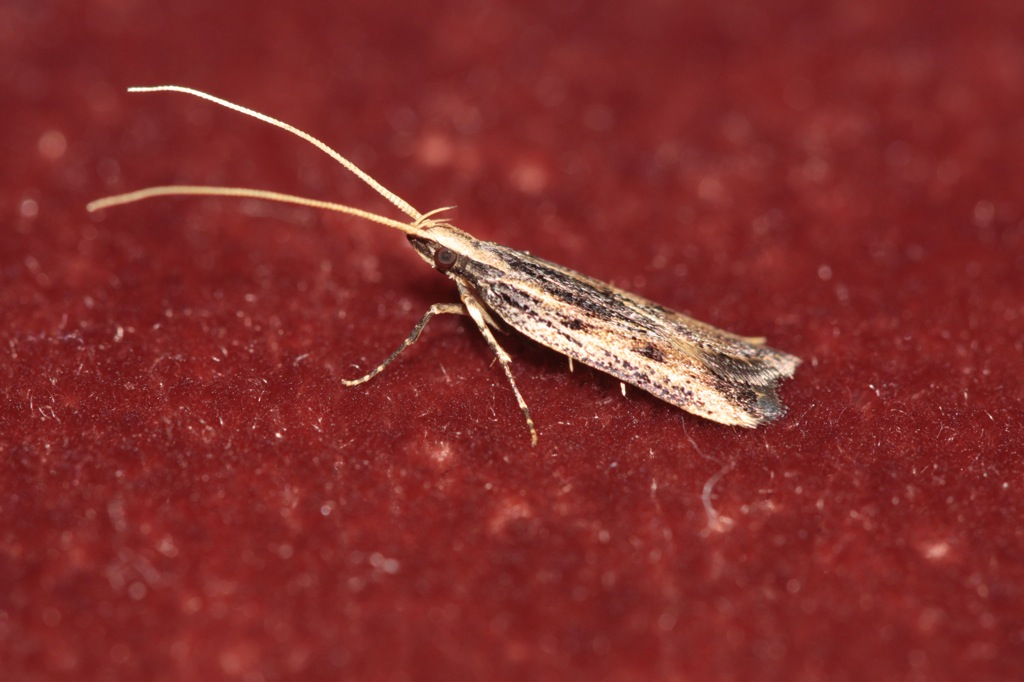
- Sarisophora leucoscia

Scientific classification
- Kingdom: Animalia
- Phylum: Arthropoda
- Class: Insecta
- Order: Lepidoptera
- Family: Lecithoceridae
- Subfamily: Lecithocerinae
- Genus: Sarisophora; Meyrick, 1904

Synonyms
- Styloceros Meyrick, 1904

= Sarisophora =

Genus of moths

Sarisophora is a genus of moths in the family Lecithoceridae.

== Species ==
- Sarisophora beckerina Park, 2012
- Sarisophora brachymita (Turner, 1919)
- Sarisophora chlaenota Meyrick, 1904
- Sarisophora cyanostigmatis Park, 2012
- Sarisophora cyclonitis (Meyrick, 1904)
- Sarisophora dactylisana Wu, 1994
- Sarisophora designata Park, 2012
- Sarisophora dispila (Turner, 1919)
- Sarisophora hadroides Park, 2012
- Sarisophora idonea Wu, 1994
- Sarisophora leptoglypta Meyrick, 1904
- Sarisophora leucoscia Turner, 1919
- Sarisophora lygrophthalma Meyrick, 1934
- Sarisophora melanotata Park, 2012
- Sarisophora neptigota Wu, 1994
- Sarisophora notornis Park, 2012
- Sarisophora nyctiphylax Turner, 1919
- Sarisophora praecentrix Meyrick, 1931
- Sarisophora ptochomorpha Meyrick, 1923
- Sarisophora pycnospila Turner, 1919
- Sarisophora pyrrhotata Park, 2012
- Sarisophora tamiodes Meyrick, 1910
