= Crocanthes sphecotypa =

Scientific classification
- Kingdom: Animalia
- Phylum: Arthropoda
- Clade: Pancrustacea
- Class: Insecta
- Order: Lepidoptera
- Family: Lecithoceridae
- Genus: Crocanthes
- Species: C. sphecotypa

Binomial name
- Crocanthes sphecotypa Meyrick, 1933

Species of moth

Crocanthes sphecotypa is a moth in the family Lecithoceridae. It was described by Edward Meyrick in 1933. It is found on Sulawesi.
