= Crocanthes scioxantha =

Scientific classification
- Kingdom: Animalia
- Phylum: Arthropoda
- Clade: Pancrustacea
- Class: Insecta
- Order: Lepidoptera
- Family: Lecithoceridae
- Genus: Crocanthes
- Species: C. scioxantha

Binomial name
- Crocanthes scioxantha Meyrick, 1910

Species of moth

Crocanthes scioxantha is a moth in the family Lecithoceridae. It was described by Edward Meyrick in 1910. It is found on New Guinea.

The wingspan is about 17 mm (0.67 in). The forewings are light yellow, becoming whitish towards the costa and termen. There are four irregular deep ochreous-yellow fasciae parallel to the termen, occupying most of the wing, the first basal, narrowest, the fourth subterminal, broadest, connected with the termen by four suffused bars. The hindwings are whitish with three broad deep ochreous-yellow fasciae similar to the last three of the forewings, and appearing as continuations of them.
