= Protolychnis marginata =

Scientific classification
- Domain: Eukaryota
- Kingdom: Animalia
- Phylum: Arthropoda
- Class: Insecta
- Order: Lepidoptera
- Family: Lecithoceridae
- Genus: Protolychnis
- Species: P. marginata

Binomial name
- Protolychnis marginata (Walsingham, 1891)

Synonyms
- Lecithocera marginata Walsingham, 1891

Species of moth

Protolychnis marginata is a moth in the family Lecithoceridae. It was described by Thomas de Grey in 1891. It is found in Gambia, Sudan and South Africa.

The wingspan is about 14 mm. The forewings are tawny fuscous, narrowly pale ochreous along the costa to a little beyond the middle. This pale ochreous costal streak is wider at the base, tapering outwards, and there is a fuscous shade on the extreme costal margin at the base. On the dark portion of the wing are two small obscure dark tawny brown spots, one at the upper edge of the cell before the middle, another just beyond the middle at the end of the cell, and equidistant from the costal and dorsal margins. The hindwings are grey.
