= Lecithocera cyamitis =

Scientific classification
- Kingdom: Animalia
- Phylum: Arthropoda
- Class: Insecta
- Order: Lepidoptera
- Family: Lecithoceridae
- Genus: Lecithocera
- Species: L. cyamitis

Binomial name
- Lecithocera cyamitis (Meyrick, 1904)

Synonyms
- Macrotona cyamitis Meyrick, 1904

Species of moth in the genus Lecithocera

Lecithocera cyamitis is a moth in the family Lecithoceridae. It was described by Edward Meyrick in 1904. It is found in Australia, where it has been recorded from Queensland.

The wingspan is about 13 mm (0.51 in). The forewings are pale whitish ochreous, somewhat suffused with fuscous irroration (sprinkles) except towards the costa. The base of the costa is dark fuscous. The stigmata are small and dark fuscous, the plical are obliquely beyond the first discal, an indistinct additional dot beneath and rather before the second discal. There are some undefined dark fuscous marks around the apex and along the termen. The hindwings are whitish fuscous.
