= Lecithocera imprudens =

Scientific classification
- Kingdom: Animalia
- Phylum: Arthropoda
- Class: Insecta
- Order: Lepidoptera
- Family: Lecithoceridae
- Genus: Lecithocera
- Species: L. imprudens

Binomial name
- Lecithocera imprudens (Meyrick, 1914)

Synonyms
- Brachmia imprudens Meyrick, 1914

Species of moth in the genus Lecithocera

Lecithocera imprudens is a moth in the family Lecithoceridae. It was described by Edward Meyrick in 1914. It is found in Australia, where it has been recorded from New South Wales and Queensland.

The wingspan is about 17 mm. The forewings are fuscous mixed with dark fuscous. The stigmata are dark fuscous, the plical rather beyond the first discal, the second discal double. There are very indistinct cloudy darker dots around the posterior part of the costa and termen. The hindwings are rather dark grey.
