= Lecithocera sobria =

Scientific classification
- Kingdom: Animalia
- Phylum: Arthropoda
- Class: Insecta
- Order: Lepidoptera
- Family: Lecithoceridae
- Genus: Lecithocera
- Species: L. sobria

Binomial name
- Lecithocera sobria (Meyrick, 1904)

Synonyms
- Macrotona sobria Meyrick, 1904

Species of moth in the genus Lecithocera

Lecithocera sobria is a moth in the family Lecithoceridae. It was described by Edward Meyrick in 1904. It is found in Australia, where it has been recorded from New South Wales.

The wingspan is 16–19 mm (0.63–0.75 in). The forewings are brown, densely irrorated (sprinkled) with whitish points, with some scattered black scales. The stigmata are represented by round spots of dark fuscous or blackish suffusion, often very indefinite, the plical sometimes obsolete, slightly beyond the first discal, the second discal larger and usually better marked, often with an adjacent whitish-ochreous spot beneath it. There is usually a dark fuscous costal suffusion above this. The hindwings are grey or dark grey.
