= Sarisophora leptoglypta =

Scientific classification
- Kingdom: Animalia
- Phylum: Arthropoda
- Class: Insecta
- Order: Lepidoptera
- Family: Lecithoceridae
- Genus: Sarisophora
- Species: S. leptoglypta

Binomial name
- Sarisophora leptoglypta Meyrick, 1904

Synonyms
- Lecithocera leptoglypta

Species of moth

Sarisophora leptoglypta is a moth in the family Lecithoceridae. It was described by Edward Meyrick in 1904. It is found in Australia, where it has been recorded from Queensland.

The wingspan is about 14 mm (0.55 in). The forewings are fuscous whitish sprinkled with dark fuscous, all veins marked with fine yellow-whitish streaks. The costal edge is suffused with dark fuscous. The stigmata are indicated by very indistinct spots of darker suffusion, the plical very obliquely beyond the first discal. The hindwings are light ochreous yellow, with the apical third rather dark fuscous.
