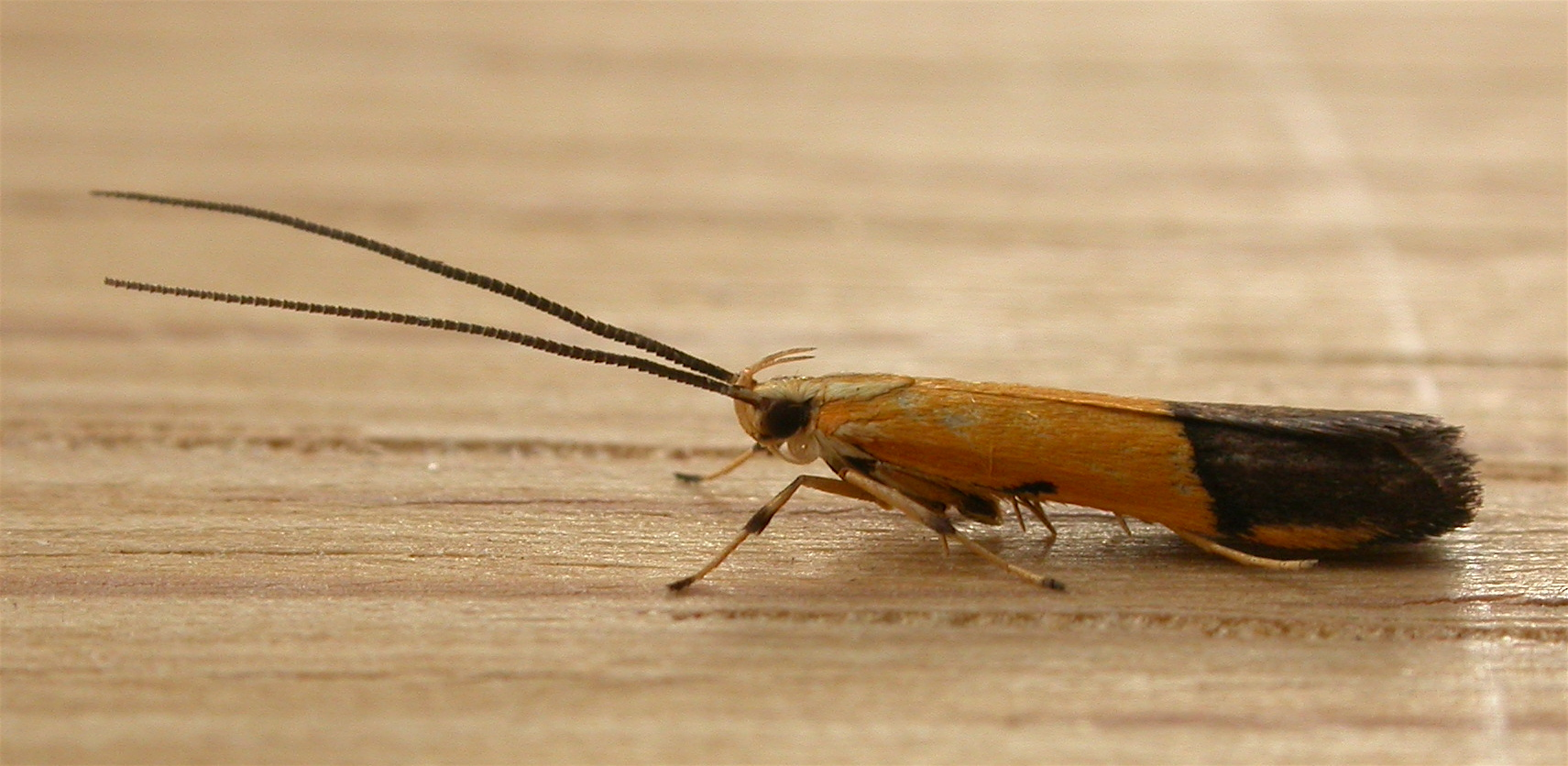

Scientific classification
- Kingdom: Animalia
- Phylum: Arthropoda
- Clade: Pancrustacea
- Class: Insecta
- Order: Lepidoptera
- Family: Lecithoceridae
- Genus: Crocanthes
- Species: C. micradelpha

Binomial name
- Crocanthes micradelpha (Lower, 1897)

Synonyms
- Gelechia micradelpha Lower, 1897

= Crocanthes micradelpha =

Species of moth

Crocanthes micradelpha is a species of moth of the family Lecithoceridae. It is found in the northern parts of Queensland in Australia.

The wingspan is about 10 mm (0.39 in). The forewings are orange-yellow with a small blackish spot on the costa at one-third from the base and a broad, purplish-fuscous, hindmarginal band, occupying one-third of the wing, the anterior edge darker, and slightly curved outwards. There is a yellowish, elongate spot on the costal portion of the band. The hindwings are dark-fuscous.

C. micradelpha lays flat eggs. The larvae that hatch from them are white, and hairy, feeding on eucalypt leaf litter.
