= Lecithocera linocoma =

Scientific classification
- Kingdom: Animalia
- Phylum: Arthropoda
- Class: Insecta
- Order: Lepidoptera
- Family: Lecithoceridae
- Genus: Lecithocera
- Species: L. linocoma

Binomial name
- Lecithocera linocoma Meyrick, 1916

Species of moth in the genus Lecithocera

Lecithocera linocoma is a moth in the family Lecithoceridae. It was described by Edward Meyrick in 1916. It is found in northern Australia.

The wingspan is about 9 mm. The forewings are rather dark grey irrorated (sprinkled) with whitish. The discal stigmata are blackish and the margin is irregularly blackish around the apex and upper part of the termen. The hindwings are light grey.
