= Lecithocera terrena =

Scientific classification
- Domain: Eukaryota
- Kingdom: Animalia
- Phylum: Arthropoda
- Class: Insecta
- Order: Lepidoptera
- Family: Lecithoceridae
- Genus: Lecithocera
- Species: L. terrena

Binomial name
- Lecithocera terrena (Turner, 1919)

Synonyms
- Sarisophora terrena Turner, 1919

Species of moth in genus Lecithocera

Lecithocera terrena is a moth in the family Lecithoceridae. It was described by Alfred Jefferis Turner in 1919. It is found in Australia, where it has been recorded from Queensland.

The wingspan is 15–17 mm. The forewings are ochreous-grey-whitish, with the first discal dot at one-third, dark fuscous and distinct. The plical is obsolete and the second, nearly obsolete, discal is found before two-third. There is some fuscous irroration between it and the tornus and some fuscous irroration on the termen. The hindwings are grey-whitish.
