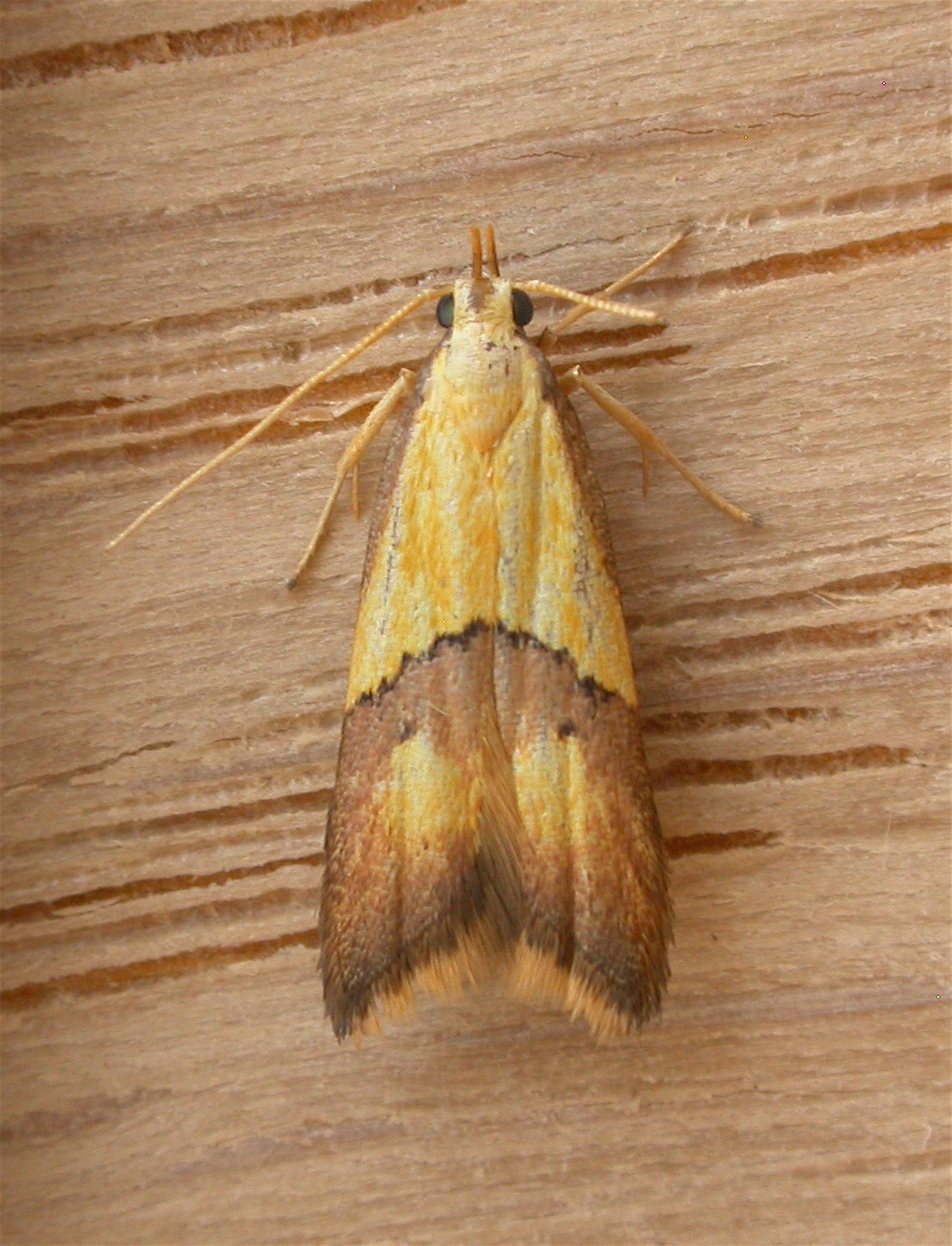

Scientific classification
- Kingdom: Animalia
- Phylum: Arthropoda
- Clade: Pancrustacea
- Class: Insecta
- Order: Lepidoptera
- Family: Lecithoceridae
- Genus: Crocanthes
- Species: C. glycina

Binomial name
- Crocanthes glycina Meyrick, 1904

Synonyms
- Crocanthes glycinae Lower, 1897

= Crocanthes glycina =

Species of moth

Crocanthes glycina is a species of moth of the family Lecithoceridae. It is found in Australia, where it has been recorded from Victoria, the Australian Capital Territory and Tasmania.

The wingspan is 15–17 mm (0.59–0.67 in). The forewings are pale clear yellow with bronzy-fuscous markings, with purplish reflections. There is a costal streak from the base to the middle, attenuated posteriorly and a moderate postmedian fascia parallel to the termen, the anterior edge irregular and finely blackish-margined, strongly or only suffusedly connected on the costa with a moderate terminal fascia, sometimes almost connected on the tornus also. The hindwings are grey, darker posteriorly and with a darker transverse discal mark.
