= Crocanthes thiomorpha =

Scientific classification
- Kingdom: Animalia
- Phylum: Arthropoda
- Clade: Pancrustacea
- Class: Insecta
- Order: Lepidoptera
- Family: Lecithoceridae
- Genus: Crocanthes
- Species: C. thiomorpha

Binomial name
- Crocanthes thiomorpha Turner, 1933

Species of moth

Crocanthes thiomorpha is a moth in the family Lecithoceridae. It was described by Alfred Jefferis Turner in 1933. It is found in Australia, where it has been recorded from Queensland.
