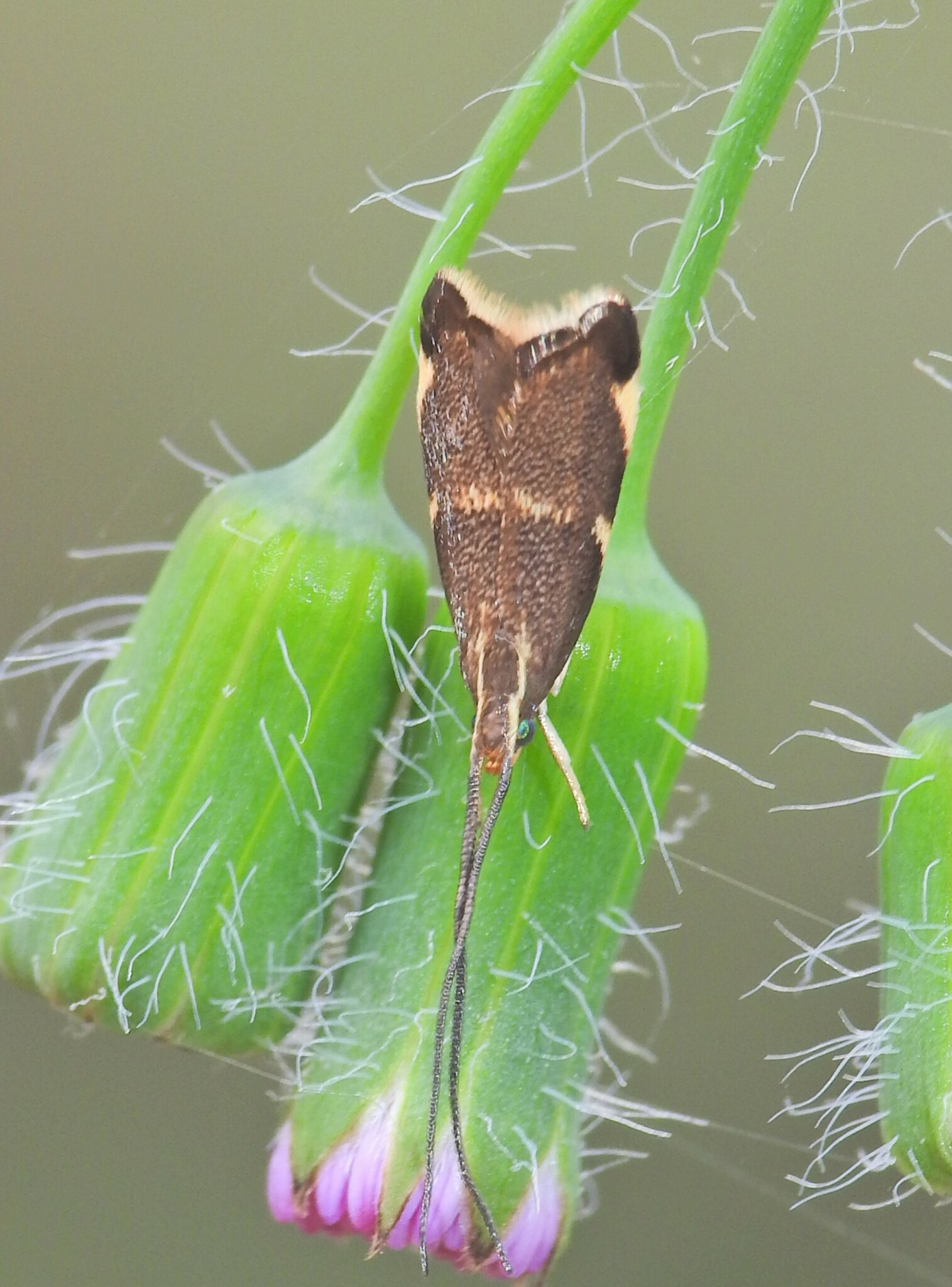

Scientific classification
- Kingdom: Animalia
- Phylum: Arthropoda
- Clade: Pancrustacea
- Class: Insecta
- Order: Lepidoptera
- Family: Lecithoceridae
- Genus: Crocanthes
- Species: C. diula

Binomial name
- Crocanthes diula Meyrick, 1904

= Crocanthes diula =

Species of moth

Crocanthes diula is a moth in the family Lecithoceridae. It was described by Edward Meyrick in 1904. It is found in Australia, where it has been recorded from Queensland.

The wingspan is 11–13 mm (0.43–0.51 in). The forewings are bronzy fuscous, irrorated (sprinkled) with dark fuscous and with an oblique whitish-ochreous mark on the costa before the middle. There is a narrow wedge-shaped whitish-ochreous mark along the costa beyond three-fourths. The hindwings are dark bronzy-fuscous.
