= Crocanthes perigrapta =

Scientific classification
- Kingdom: Animalia
- Phylum: Arthropoda
- Clade: Pancrustacea
- Class: Insecta
- Order: Lepidoptera
- Family: Lecithoceridae
- Genus: Crocanthes
- Species: C. perigrapta

Binomial name
- Crocanthes perigrapta Meyrick, 1904

Species of moth

Crocanthes perigrapta is a moth in the family Lecithoceridae. It was described by Edward Meyrick in 1904. It is found in Australia, where it has been recorded from Queensland, New South Wales and South Australia.

The wingspan is 12–14 mm (0.47–0.55 in). The forewings are ochreous yellow with a blackish costal streak from the base to the middle and sometimes a dark fuscous subdorsal dot at one-fourth. There is a blackish inwards-curved line from three-fourths of the costa to four-fifths of the dorsum, somewhat produced posteriorly on the costa. There is also a black line along the termen. The hindwings are grey, more or less suffused with pale yellowish, the apical fourth forming a more or less defined pale yellowish band, the terminal edge dark grey or blackish, sometimes with a dark grey discal spot.
