= Sarisophora pycnospila =

Scientific classification
- Domain: Eukaryota
- Kingdom: Animalia
- Phylum: Arthropoda
- Class: Insecta
- Order: Lepidoptera
- Family: Lecithoceridae
- Genus: Sarisophora
- Species: S. pycnospila

Binomial name
- Sarisophora pycnospila Turner, 1919

Synonyms
- Lecithocera pycnospila

Species of moth

Sarisophora pycnospila is a moth in the family Lecithoceridae. It was described by Alfred Jefferis Turner in 1919. It is found in Australia, where it has been recorded in Queensland.

The wingspan is 13–17 mm. The forewings are grey-whitish suffused with fuscous and with the markings and some scattered irroration dark-fuscous. The discal spots are large, the first discal at one-third, the plical slightly before it, the two nearly confluent, the second discal at two-thirds. There are three or four obscure spots on the costa beyond the middle. The hindwings are pale grey.
