= Crocanthes acroxantha =

Scientific classification
- Kingdom: Animalia
- Phylum: Arthropoda
- Clade: Pancrustacea
- Class: Insecta
- Order: Lepidoptera
- Family: Lecithoceridae
- Genus: Crocanthes
- Species: C. acroxantha

Binomial name
- Crocanthes acroxantha Lower, 1896

Species of moth

Crocanthes acroxantha is a moth in the family Lecithoceridae. It was described by Oswald Bertram Lower in 1896. It is found in Australia, where it has been recorded from Queensland.

The wingspan is about 12 mm (0.47 in). The forewings are yellow, finely irrorated (sprinkled) throughout with fuscous. There is a narrow fuscous streak along the costa from the base to the middle and a narrow fuscous elongate mark on the costa at three-fourths, from the anterior extremity of which proceeds a fuscous streak to two-thirds of the inner margin with a slight curve at the extremity. There is an irregular fuscous hindmarginal line, not reaching the extremities. The hindwings are fuscous.
