= Crocanthes pancala =

Scientific classification
- Kingdom: Animalia
- Phylum: Arthropoda
- Clade: Pancrustacea
- Class: Insecta
- Order: Lepidoptera
- Family: Lecithoceridae
- Genus: Crocanthes
- Species: C. pancala

Binomial name
- Crocanthes pancala (Turner, 1919)

Synonyms
- Aprosoesta pancala Turner, 1919

Species of moth

Crocanthes pancala is a moth in the family Lecithoceridae. It was described by Alfred Jefferis Turner in 1919. It is found in Australia, where it has been recorded from Queensland.

The wingspan is about 13 mm (0.51 in). The forewings are pale-yellow partly suffused with deeper yellow and with fuscous markings. There is an inwardly oblique narrow fascia from the costa near the base to the base of the dorsum and a second similar parallel fascia shortly beyond this. There is also a short line or transverse discal mark before the middle and a third fascia at two-thirds, as well as a fourth subterminal, the latter ill-defined anteriorly. There is also a broad terminal line. The hindwings are whitish partly suffused with yellow and with a basal fuscous patch and a yellow dot edged with fuscous in the disc at one-third, as well as a median transverse fuscous fascia enclosing two yellow dots. An irregular subterminal fascia and a terminal line are both fuscous.
