= Crocanthes zonodesma =

Scientific classification
- Kingdom: Animalia
- Phylum: Arthropoda
- Clade: Pancrustacea
- Class: Insecta
- Order: Lepidoptera
- Family: Lecithoceridae
- Genus: Crocanthes
- Species: C. zonodesma

Binomial name
- Crocanthes zonodesma Lower, 1900

Species of moth

Crocanthes zonodesma is a moth in the family Lecithoceridae. It was described by Oswald Bertram Lower in 1900. It is found in Australia, where it has been recorded from Queensland.

The wingspan is 14–17 mm (0.55–0.67 in). The forewings are orange yellow with purple-brown markings. There is a broad costal streak from the base to two-thirds, as well as some scattered scales and dorsal suffusion beneath it. There is a patch occupying the terminal half of the wing, the anterior edge slightly curved, irregular, from the middle of the costa to beyond the middle of the dorsum, enclosing an orange-yellow oval blotch in the middle. A dot is found on the dorsum before the tornus, and an elongate suffused mark along the costa towards the apex. The hindwings are dark bronzy.
