= Lecithocera noseropa =

Scientific classification
- Domain: Eukaryota
- Kingdom: Animalia
- Phylum: Arthropoda
- Class: Insecta
- Order: Lepidoptera
- Family: Lecithoceridae
- Genus: Lecithocera
- Species: L. noseropa

Binomial name
- Lecithocera noseropa (Turner, 1919)

Synonyms
- Styloceros noseropa Turner, 1919

Species of moth in genus Lecithocera

Lecithocera noseropa is a moth in the family Lecithoceridae. It was described by Alfred Jefferis Turner in 1919. It is found in Australia, where it has been recorded from Queensland.

The wingspan is about 10 mm. The forewings are brown-whitish with slight fuscous irroration. The stigmata are obsolete. The hindwings are pale-grey.
