= Crocanthes doliopa =

Scientific classification
- Kingdom: Animalia
- Phylum: Arthropoda
- Clade: Pancrustacea
- Class: Insecta
- Order: Lepidoptera
- Family: Lecithoceridae
- Genus: Crocanthes
- Species: C. doliopa

Binomial name
- Crocanthes doliopa Meyrick, 1921

Species of moth

Crocanthes doliopa is a moth in the family Lecithoceridae. It was described by Edward Meyrick in 1921. It is found in Australia, where it has been recorded from Queensland.

The wingspan is about 13 mm (0.51 in). The forewings are dark purplish fuscous with a broad yellow transverse band extending from near the base to the middle of the costa and dorsum, the posterior edge rather concave. The hindwings are dark fuscous.
