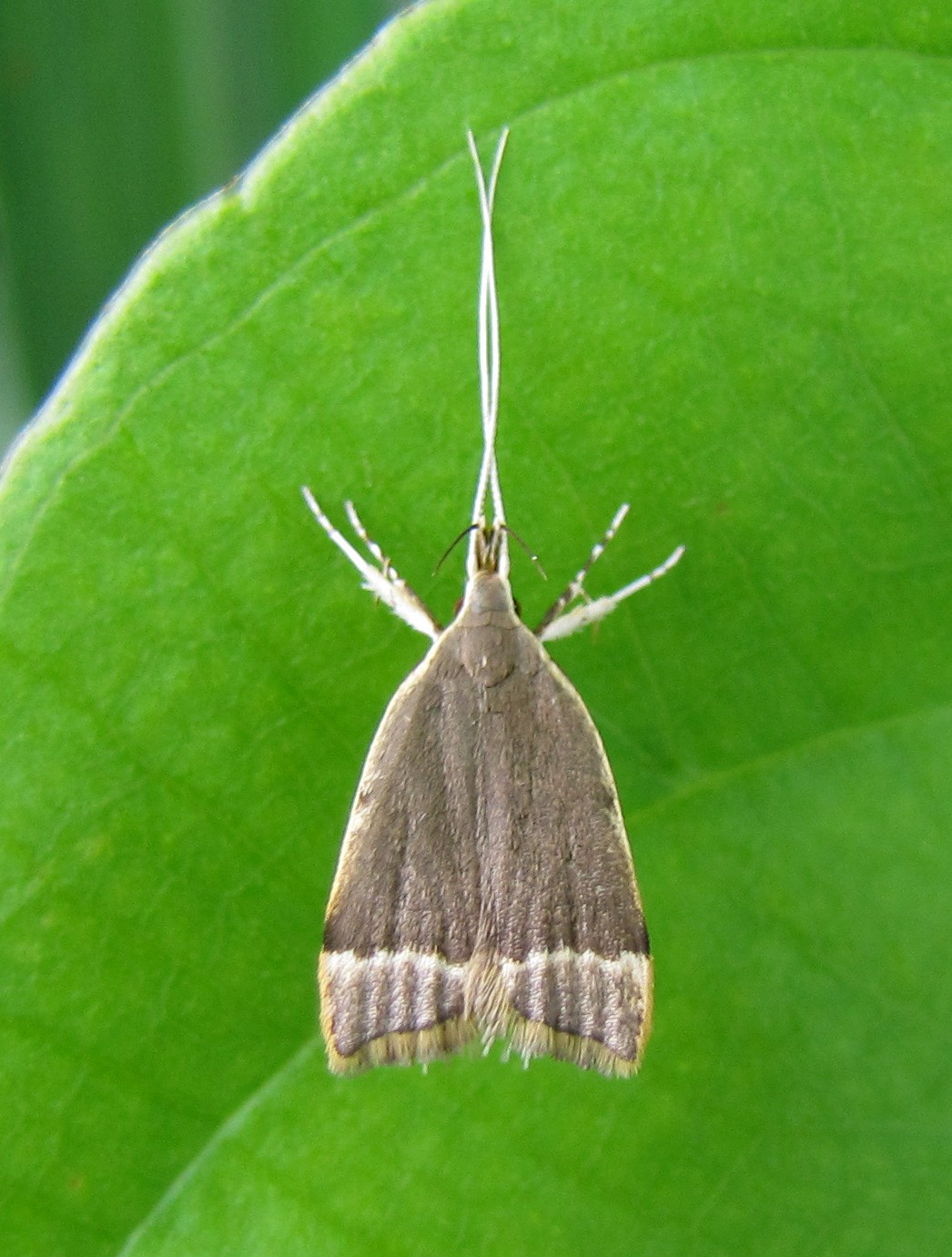

Scientific classification
- Domain: Eukaryota
- Kingdom: Animalia
- Phylum: Arthropoda
- Class: Insecta
- Order: Lepidoptera
- Family: Lecithoceridae
- Genus: Lecithocera
- Species: L. tenella

Binomial name
- Lecithocera tenella Turner, 1919

Synonyms
- Sarisophora tenella Turner, 1919

= Lecithocera tenella =

Species of moth

Lecithocera tenella is a moth in the family Lecithoceridae. It is found in India and Australia.

The wingspan is 9–10 mm. The forewings are dark brown.
