= Sarisophora chlaenota =

Scientific classification
- Kingdom: Animalia
- Phylum: Arthropoda
- Class: Insecta
- Order: Lepidoptera
- Family: Lecithoceridae
- Genus: Sarisophora
- Species: S. chlaenota

Binomial name
- Sarisophora chlaenota Meyrick, 1904

Synonyms
- Lecithocera chlaenota

Species of moth

Sarisophora chlaenota is a moth in the family Lecithoceridae. It was described by Edward Meyrick in 1904. It is found in Australia, where it has been recorded from New South Wales.

The wingspan is about 15 mm (0.59 in). The forewings are bronzy fuscous, much suffused with dark ashy fuscous, with a few scattered black scales. The stigmata are black and very undefined, the plical indefinitely elongate. The hindwings are pale ochreous yellow, the terminal half dark fuscous.
