= Lecithocera eumenopis =

Scientific classification
- Kingdom: Animalia
- Phylum: Arthropoda
- Class: Insecta
- Order: Lepidoptera
- Family: Lecithoceridae
- Genus: Lecithocera
- Species: L. eumenopis

Binomial name
- Lecithocera eumenopis Meyrick, 1914

Species of moth in the genus Lecithocera

Lecithocera eumenopis is a moth in the family Lecithoceridae. It was described by Edward Meyrick in 1914. It is found in northern Australia.

The wingspan is about 19 mm. The forewings are dark ashy fuscous. The discal stigmata are obscure and blackish, with an additional dot beneath the second. The hindwings are dark grey, the cell occupied by a suffused light ochreous-yellowish patch.
