= Sarisophora brachymita =

Scientific classification
- Domain: Eukaryota
- Kingdom: Animalia
- Phylum: Arthropoda
- Class: Insecta
- Order: Lepidoptera
- Family: Lecithoceridae
- Genus: Sarisophora
- Species: S. brachymita

Binomial name
- Sarisophora brachymita (Turner, 1919)

Synonyms
- Styloceros brachymita Turner, 1919; Lecithocera brachymita

Species of moth

Sarisophora brachymita is a moth in the family Lecithoceridae. It was described by Alfred Jefferis Turner in 1919. It is found in Australia, where it has been recorded from Queensland.

The wingspan is about 16 mm. The forewings are whitish-ochreous suffused with fuscous and with some dark-fuscous irroration. The markings are dark fuscous. There is a fine subcostal line from the base to one-third and the first discal is found before the middle, the plical beneath it, elongate, the second discal is ill-defined, and has the form of a spot at the tornus. There is a fine whitish-ochreous streak along the fold, interrupted by the plical and a similar short streak between the first and second discal. The hindwings are pale grey.
