= Lecithocera isophanes =

Scientific classification
- Kingdom: Animalia
- Phylum: Arthropoda
- Clade: Pancrustacea
- Class: Insecta
- Order: Lepidoptera
- Family: Lecithoceridae
- Genus: Lecithocera
- Species: L. isophanes

Binomial name
- Lecithocera isophanes (Turner, 1919)

Synonyms
- Styloceros isophanes Turner, 1919

Species of moth in genus Lecithocera

Lecithocera isophanes is a moth in the family Lecithoceridae. It was described by Alfred Jefferis Turner in 1919. It is found in Australia, where it has been recorded from Queensland and New South Wales.

The wingspan is about 10 mm. The forewings are pale fuscous with two blackish discal spots, the first at one-third, the second before two-thirds, the plical obsolete. There are some dark fuscous scales on the termen. The hindwings are pale-grey.
