= Crocanthes characotis =

Scientific classification
- Kingdom: Animalia
- Phylum: Arthropoda
- Clade: Pancrustacea
- Class: Insecta
- Order: Lepidoptera
- Family: Lecithoceridae
- Genus: Crocanthes
- Species: C. characotis

Binomial name
- Crocanthes characotis Meyrick, 1916

Species of moth

Crocanthes characotis is a moth in the family Lecithoceridae. It was described by Edward Meyrick in 1916. It is found in Australia, where it has been recorded from the Northern Territory and Queensland.

The wingspan is about 11 mm (0.43 in). The forewings are deep ochreous yellow with dark fuscous markings. There is a dot beneath the base of the costa, and a mark on the base of the dorsum. Two transverse slightly incurved lines are found at about one-third and two-thirds. The first discal stigma is small, following the first line, the second is larger, preceding the second line. The hindwings are grey with the costal area (interrupted by a bar at two-thirds), an irregular apical patch, and an irregular terminal line pale yellowish. There is also a cloudy darker grey spot on the end of the cell.
