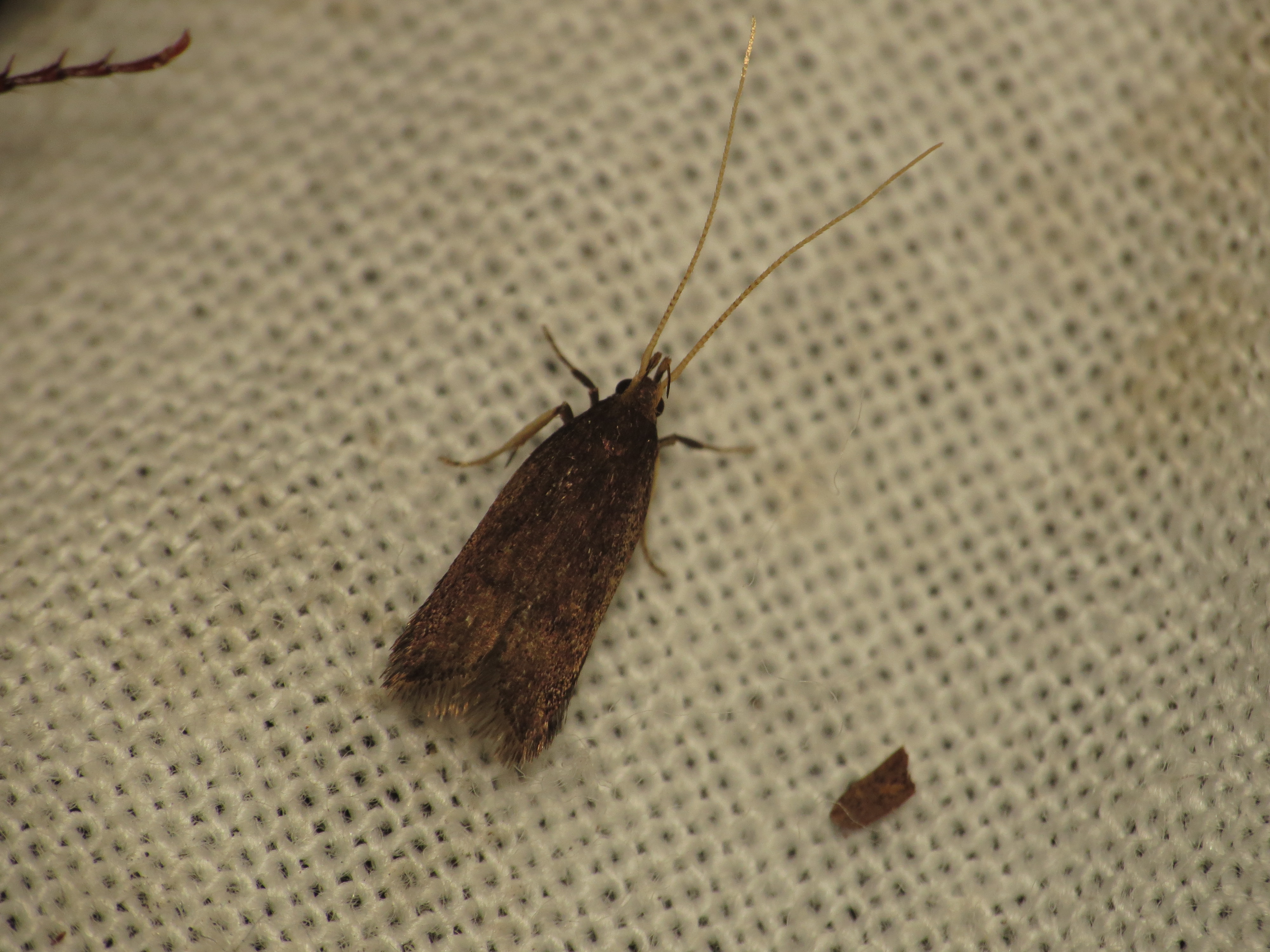

Scientific classification
- Kingdom: Animalia
- Phylum: Arthropoda
- Class: Insecta
- Order: Lepidoptera
- Family: Lecithoceridae
- Genus: Lecithocera
- Species: L. terrigena

Binomial name
- Lecithocera terrigena (Meyrick, 1904)

Synonyms
- Macrotona terrigena Meyrick, 1904

= Lecithocera terrigena =

Species of moth in the genus Lecithocera

Lecithocera terrigena is a moth in the family Lecithoceridae. It was described by Edward Meyrick in 1904. It is found in Australia, where it has been recorded from New South Wales and Tasmania.

The wingspan is about 12 mm (0.47 in). The forewings are dark bronzy fuscous and the hindwings are rather dark fuscous.
