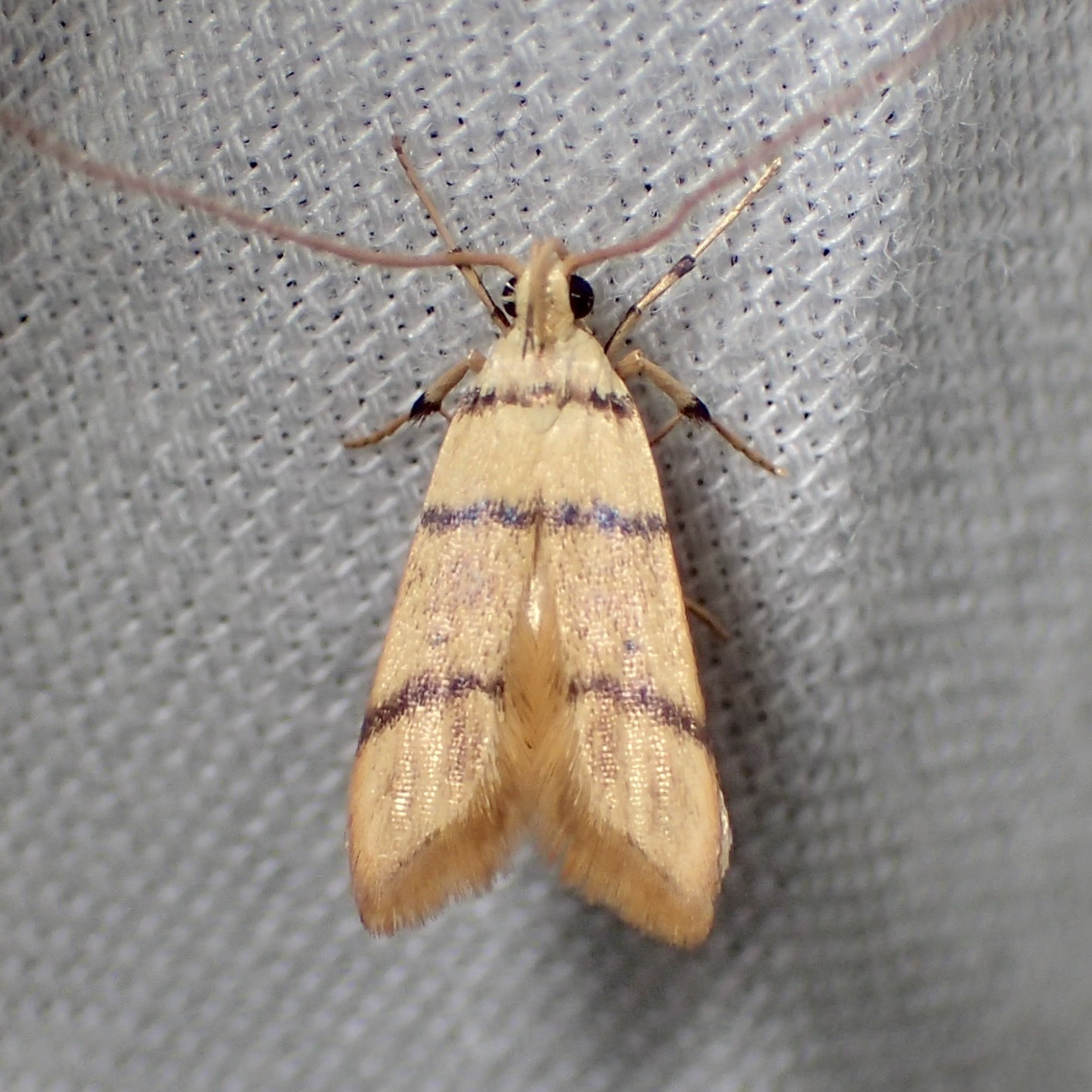

Scientific classification
- Kingdom: Animalia
- Phylum: Arthropoda
- Clade: Pancrustacea
- Class: Insecta
- Order: Lepidoptera
- Family: Lecithoceridae
- Genus: Crocanthes
- Species: C. chordotona

Binomial name
- Crocanthes chordotona Meyrick, 1916

= Crocanthes chordotona =

Species of moth

Crocanthes chordotona is a moth in the family Lecithoceridae. It was described by Edward Meyrick in 1916. It is found in Australia, where it has been recorded from Queensland.

The wingspan is about 13 mm (0.51 in). The forewings are deep ochreous yellow, with a few scattered purplish scales. The markings are dark purple fuscous with three nearly straight transverse lines, the first almost basal, the second at one-third, the third slightly beyond two-thirds, somewhat inwards oblique from the costa. The second discal stigma is moderate, preceding the third line. The hindwings are whitish yellowish with a grey dot on the end of the cell and a sinuate transverse grey line at two-thirds.
