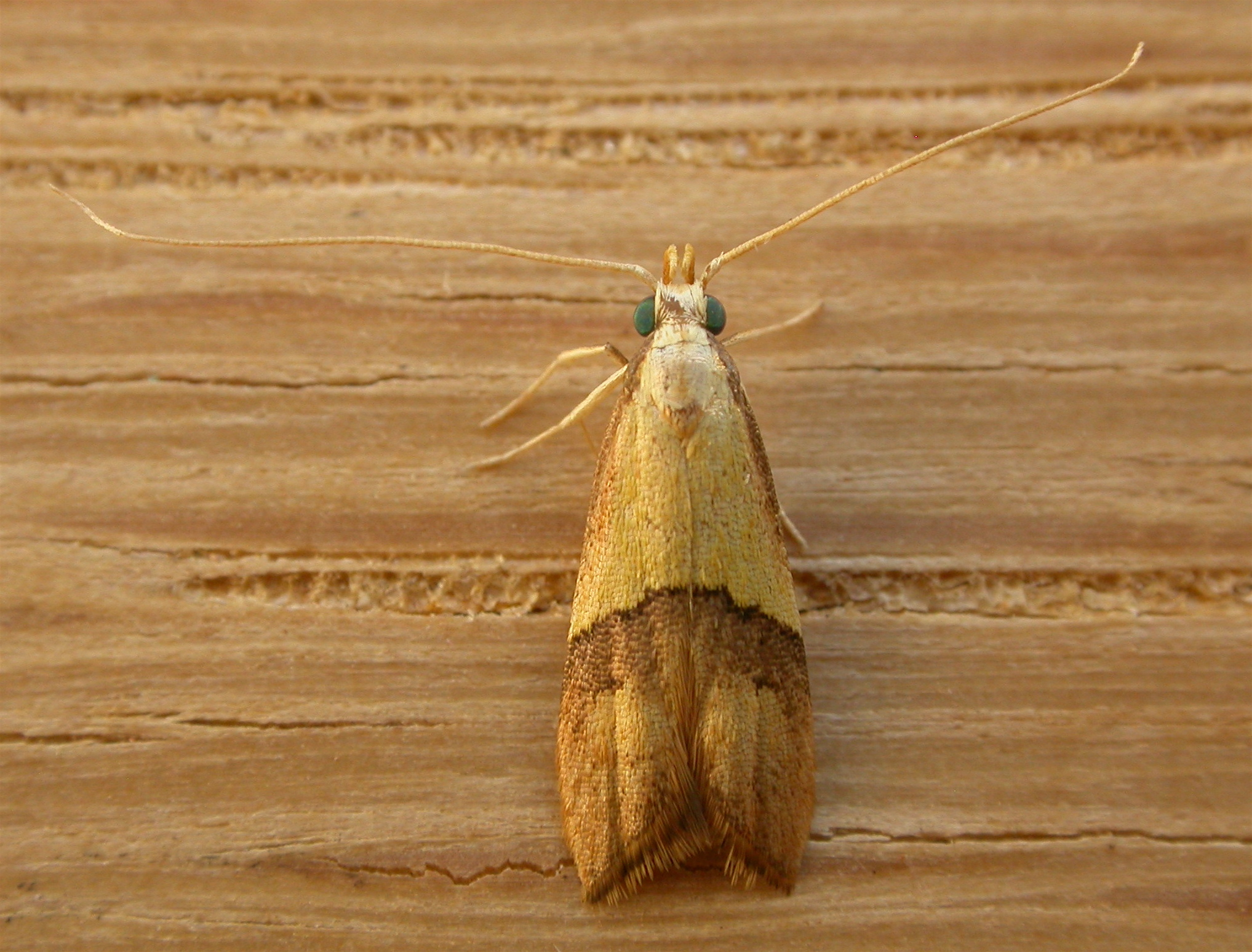

Scientific classification
- Kingdom: Animalia
- Phylum: Arthropoda
- Clade: Pancrustacea
- Class: Insecta
- Order: Lepidoptera
- Family: Lecithoceridae
- Genus: Crocanthes
- Species: C. prasinopis

Binomial name
- Crocanthes prasinopis Meyrick, 1886

= Crocanthes prasinopis =

Species of moth

Crocanthes prasinopis is a species of moth of the family Lecithoceridae. It is found in most Australia and New Guinea.

The wingspan is 13–15 mm (0.51–0.59 in). The forewings are rather deep yellow with ochreous-fuscous markings, with purple reflections. There is a costal streak from the base to two-fifths and a patch occupying the terminal half of the wing, the anterior edge straight or seldom bent, irregular, dark fuscous, running from the middle of the costa to beyond the middle of the dorsum, enclosing a roundish suffused central deep yellow blotch. The hindwings are whitish-yellowish, posteriorly suffused with fuscous, darker towards the apex. There is a dark grey transverse discal mark.

The larvae feed on moist dead gum leaves in leaf litter. Young larvae are pink, while later instars are brown. Pupation takes place in the leaf litter between two leaves in a silken shelter covered with hairs and detritus.
