= Lecithocera poliocoma =

Scientific classification
- Domain: Eukaryota
- Kingdom: Animalia
- Phylum: Arthropoda
- Class: Insecta
- Order: Lepidoptera
- Family: Lecithoceridae
- Genus: Lecithocera
- Species: L. poliocoma

Binomial name
- Lecithocera poliocoma Meyrick, 1916

Species of moth in the genus Lecithocera

Lecithocera poliocoma is a moth in the family Lecithoceridae. It was described by Edward Meyrick in 1916. It is found in northern Australia.

The wingspan is about 12 mm. The forewings are a dark, grey-brown color and the hindwings are grey.
