= Crocanthes trizona =

Scientific classification
- Kingdom: Animalia
- Phylum: Arthropoda
- Clade: Pancrustacea
- Class: Insecta
- Order: Lepidoptera
- Family: Lecithoceridae
- Genus: Crocanthes
- Species: C. trizona

Binomial name
- Crocanthes trizona Lower, 1916

Synonyms
- Crocanthes trizona Turner, 1919

Species of moth

Crocanthes trizona is a moth in the family Lecithoceridae. It was described by Oswald Bertram Lower in 1916. It is found in Australia, where it has been recorded from Queensland.

The wingspan is about 10 mm (0.39 in). The forewings are pale yellowish white, with fuscous markings. There are three narrow transverse fasciae, the first two somewhat dot like, the first from the costa at one-sixth, the second from the costa at about one-third, both continued obscurely to the dorsum. The third is slightly inwards curved, from the costa at four-fifths to the dorsum at four-fifths. There is a lunate mark, transversely placed, above the middle, just before the third fascia. The hindwings are thinly scaled and greyish white.
