= Lecithocera alampes =

Scientific classification
- Domain: Eukaryota
- Kingdom: Animalia
- Phylum: Arthropoda
- Class: Insecta
- Order: Lepidoptera
- Family: Lecithoceridae
- Genus: Lecithocera
- Species: L. alampes

Binomial name
- Lecithocera alampes Turner, 1919

Species of moth in genus Lecithocera

Lecithocera alampes is a moth in the family Lecithoceridae. It was described by Alfred Jefferis Turner in 1919. It is found in Australia, where it has been recorded from Queensland and New South Wales.

The wingspan is 13–17 mm. The forewings are brownish-fuscous or fuscous. The stigmata are very obscure, the plical beneath the first discal, the second discal double. The hindwings are grey.
