= Lecithocera absumptella =

Scientific classification
- Kingdom: Animalia
- Phylum: Arthropoda
- Class: Insecta
- Order: Lepidoptera
- Family: Lecithoceridae
- Genus: Lecithocera
- Species: L. absumptella

Binomial name
- Lecithocera absumptella (Walker, 1864)

Synonyms
- Gelechia absumptella Walker, 1864

Species of moth in genus Lecithocera

Lecithocera absumptella is a moth in the family Lecithoceridae. It was described by Francis Walker in 1864. It is found in Australia.
