= Crocanthes halurga =

Scientific classification
- Kingdom: Animalia
- Phylum: Arthropoda
- Clade: Pancrustacea
- Class: Insecta
- Order: Lepidoptera
- Family: Lecithoceridae
- Genus: Crocanthes
- Species: C. halurga

Binomial name
- Crocanthes halurga Meyrick, 1904

Species of moth

Crocanthes halurga is a moth in the family Lecithoceridae. It was described by Edward Meyrick in 1904. It is found in Australia, where it has been recorded from Queensland.

The wingspan is about 11 mm (0.43 in). The forewings are orange with dark purple-fuscous markings. There is a broad costal streak from the base to two-fifths, confluent with an undefined antemedian fascia, which is also connected with the base by a subdorsal line. There is a patch occupying the terminal half of the wing, the anterior edge almost straight, blackish, running from the middle of the costa to beyond the middle of the dorsum, enclosing an erect orange blotch from the tornus, reaching three-fourths of the way across the wing, and a narrow orange suffusion along the costa at about four-fifths. The hindwings are dark fuscous.
