= Crocanthes epitherma =

Scientific classification
- Kingdom: Animalia
- Phylum: Arthropoda
- Clade: Pancrustacea
- Class: Insecta
- Order: Lepidoptera
- Family: Lecithoceridae
- Genus: Crocanthes
- Species: C. epitherma

Binomial name
- Crocanthes epitherma Lower, 1896

Species of moth

Crocanthes epitherma is a moth in the family Lecithoceridae. It was described by Oswald Bertram Lower in 1896. It is found in Australia, where it has been recorded from Queensland.

The wingspan is about 10 mm (0.39 in) for males and 12 mm (0.47 in) for females. The forewings are bright orange yellow with a thick fuscous streak along the basal half of the costa. There is a faint elongate fuscous spot on the costa just beyond this, from which proceeds a faint curved line to about the middle of the hindmargin, but hardly reaching it. A few faint fuscous scales are found along the inner margin towards the base and there is a strongly marked fine black hindmarginal line, hardly reaching the margins. The hindwings are pale yellow with a very faintly indicated angulated line from the middle of the costa approaching the inner margin, but not reaching it.
