= Sarisophora cyclonitis =

Scientific classification
- Kingdom: Animalia
- Phylum: Arthropoda
- Class: Insecta
- Order: Lepidoptera
- Family: Lecithoceridae
- Genus: Sarisophora
- Species: S. cyclonitis

Binomial name
- Sarisophora cyclonitis (Meyrick, 1904)

Synonyms
- Styloceros cyclonitis Meyrick, 1904; Lecithocera cyclonitis

Species of moth

Sarisophora cyclonitis is a moth in the family Lecithoceridae. It was described by Edward Meyrick in 1904. It is found in Australia, where it has been recorded from Queensland.

The wingspan is 11–13 mm (0.43–0.51 in). The forewings are rather dark fuscous, irrorated (sprinkled) with whitish-ochreous points, with scattered blackish-fuscous scales and a short black subcostal dash from the base. There is a whitish-ochreous plical mark at one-fourth, edged with some black scales. The stigmata are indicated by obscure spots of blackish-fuscous suffusion, the plical obliquely beyond the first discal, all followed by some obscure whitish-ochreous suffusion. The hindwings are fuscous.
