= Sarisophora nyctiphylax =

Scientific classification
- Domain: Eukaryota
- Kingdom: Animalia
- Phylum: Arthropoda
- Class: Insecta
- Order: Lepidoptera
- Family: Lecithoceridae
- Genus: Sarisophora
- Species: S. nyctiphylax

Binomial name
- Sarisophora nyctiphylax Turner, 1919

Synonyms
- Lecithocera nyctiphylax

Species of moth

Sarisophora nyctiphylax is a moth in the family Lecithoceridae. It was described by Alfred Jefferis Turner in 1919. It is found in Australia, where it has been recorded from Queensland.

The wingspan is about 15 mm. The forewings are brownish-fuscous with a few scattered blackish scales. The discal dots are nearly obsolete, the plical below the first discal. The hindwings are grey, the basal third whitish-ochreous and its edges suffused.
