= Lecithocera chamela =

Scientific classification
- Domain: Eukaryota
- Kingdom: Animalia
- Phylum: Arthropoda
- Class: Insecta
- Order: Lepidoptera
- Family: Lecithoceridae
- Genus: Lecithocera
- Species: L. chamela

Binomial name
- Lecithocera chamela Turner, 1919

Species of moth in genus Lecithocera

Lecithocera chamela is a moth in the family Lecithoceridae. It was described by Alfred Jefferis Turner in 1919. It is found in Australia, where it has been recorded from Queensland.

The wingspan is 12–17 mm. The forewings are pale reddish-brown with a few scattered fuscous scales and with a fuscous dot on the base of the costa. The first discal is fuscous and found at one-fourth, the plical obsolete, the second discal beyond the middle with a spot beneath it. The hindwings are grey-whitish.
