= Sarisophora dispila =

Scientific classification
- Domain: Eukaryota
- Kingdom: Animalia
- Phylum: Arthropoda
- Class: Insecta
- Order: Lepidoptera
- Family: Lecithoceridae
- Genus: Sarisophora
- Species: S. dispila

Binomial name
- Sarisophora dispila (Turner, 1919)

Synonyms
- Styloceros dispila Turner, 1919; Lecithocera dispila

Species of moth

Sarisophora dispila is a moth in the family Lecithoceridae. It was described by Alfred Jefferis Turner in 1919. It is found in Australia, where it has been recorded from the Northern Territory.

The wingspan is about 11 mm. The forewings are fuscous. The stigmata are dark fuscous, the first discal large and round and found at one-third, the second discal similar, found before two-thirds, the plical minute and found beneath the first discal. The hindwings are pale grey.
