= Protolychnis trigonias =

Scientific classification
- Kingdom: Animalia
- Phylum: Arthropoda
- Class: Insecta
- Order: Lepidoptera
- Family: Lecithoceridae
- Genus: Protolychnis
- Species: P. trigonias

Binomial name
- Protolychnis trigonias (Meyrick, 1904)

Synonyms
- Styloceros trigonias Meyrick, 1904

Species of moth

Protolychnis trigonias is a moth in the family Lecithoceridae. It was described by Edward Meyrick in 1904. It is found in Australia, where it has been recorded from Queensland.

The wingspan is about 16 mm (0.63 in). The forewings are dark purplish bronzy fuscous, the dorsum marked with obscure whitish-ochreous strigulae. There is a narrow obscure straight antemedian fascia of whitish-ochreous suffusion and there is a small whitish-ochreous discal spot at two-thirds, as well as a small triangular whitish-ochreous costal spot before three-fourths. The hindwings are pale whitish ochreous, irrorated (sprinkled) with light fuscous except towards the base.
