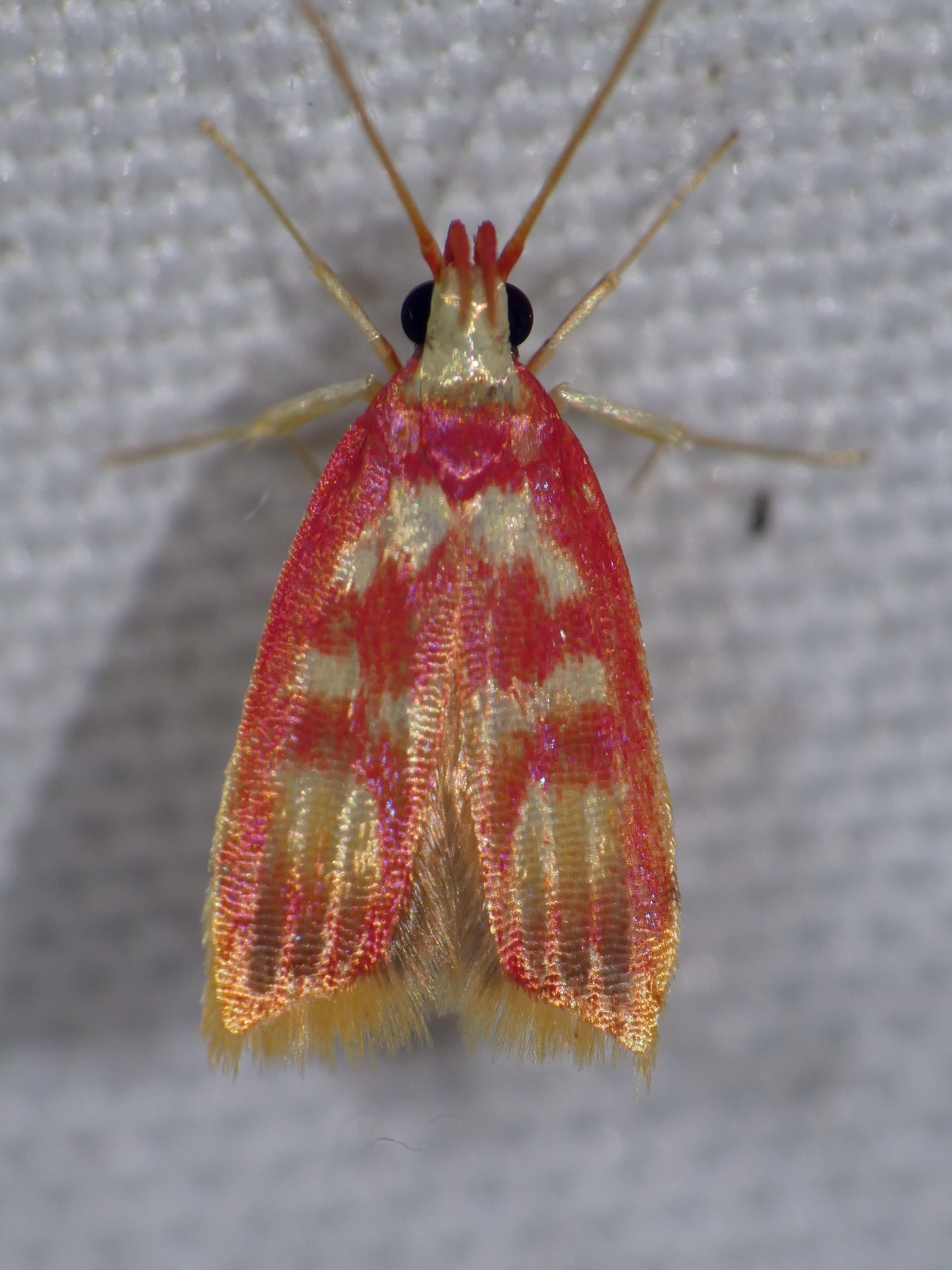

Scientific classification
- Kingdom: Animalia
- Phylum: Arthropoda
- Clade: Pancrustacea
- Class: Insecta
- Order: Lepidoptera
- Family: Lecithoceridae
- Genus: Crocanthes
- Species: C. sidonia

Binomial name
- Crocanthes sidonia Meyrick, 1910

= Crocanthes sidonia =

Species of moth

Crocanthes sidonia is a moth in the family Lecithoceridae. It was described by Edward Meyrick in 1910. It is found on New Guinea and Australia, where it has been recorded from Queensland.

The wingspan is 13–14 mm (0.51–0.55 in) for males and 14–15 mm (0.55–0.59 in) for females. The forewings are pale whitish ochreous with bright crimson-rose markings. There is a rather broad costal streak throughout, the costal edge posteriorly and apex yellow. There are four irregular transverse fasciae, the first basal, the second before the middle, connected with the first on the dorsum by a narrow streaks, the third beyond the middle and the fourth terminal, broader, dilated towards the costa, connected with the third by a streak on the dorsum. There is also a streak of dark grey suffusion from four-fifths of the costa in the middle of the termen, sometimes reduced to a small costal spot or wholly obsolete. The hindwings are pale yellowish, sometimes more or less tinged with grey, especially towards the apex, the termen tinged with rosy below the middle.
