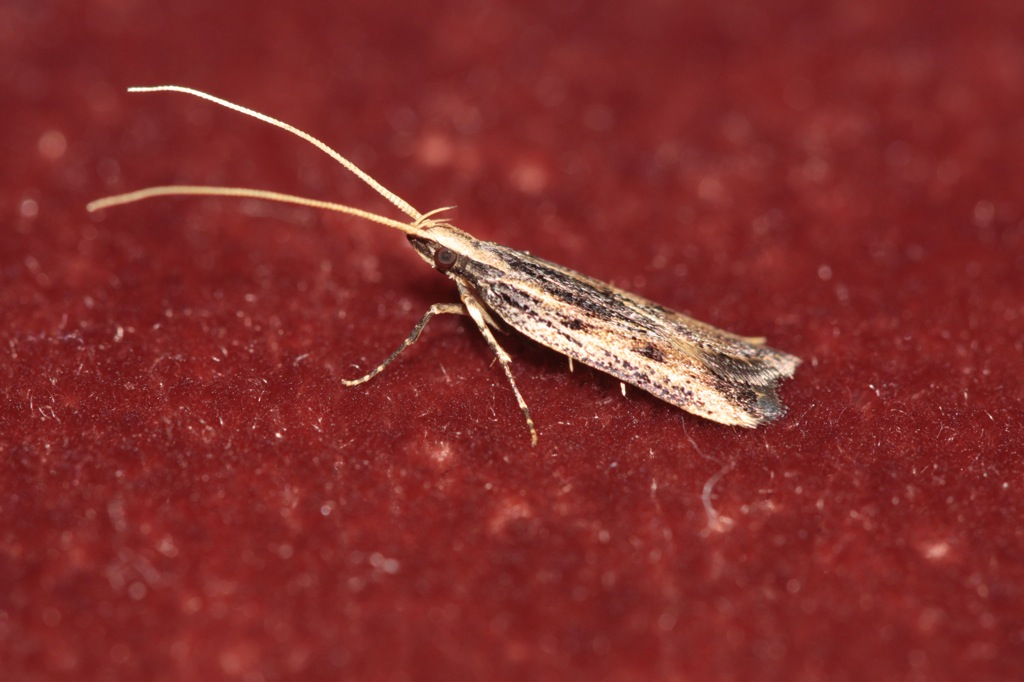

Scientific classification
- Domain: Eukaryota
- Kingdom: Animalia
- Phylum: Arthropoda
- Class: Insecta
- Order: Lepidoptera
- Family: Lecithoceridae
- Genus: Sarisophora
- Species: S. leucoscia

Binomial name
- Sarisophora leucoscia Turner, 1919

Synonyms
- Lecithocera leucoscia

= Sarisophora leucoscia =

Species of moth

Sarisophora leucoscia is a moth in the family Lecithoceridae. It is found in Australia (including Queensland) and New Zealand.

The wingspan is approximately 15 mm. The forewings are whitish suffused with fuscous, leaving the basal costal area, a median streak, and much of the central area is whitish. There is a broad rounded dark-fuscous dorsal patch from the base to beyond the middle area. The discal spots are dark-fuscous, the first discal at one-third, the second discal just beyond the middle and the plical included in the dorsal patch. A dark-fuscous subcostal line is found from the base to one-fourth of the wings and some dark fuscous scales are present on the postmedian veins. The hindwings are pale grey.
