= Crocanthes thermobapta =

Scientific classification
- Kingdom: Animalia
- Phylum: Arthropoda
- Clade: Pancrustacea
- Class: Insecta
- Order: Lepidoptera
- Family: Lecithoceridae
- Genus: Crocanthes
- Species: C. thermobapta

Binomial name
- Crocanthes thermobapta Lower, 1920

Species of moth

Crocanthes thermobapta is a moth in the family Lecithoceridae. It was described by Oswald Bertram Lower in 1920. It is found in Australia, where it has been recorded from Queensland.

The wingspan is 12–14 mm (0.47–0.55 in). The forewings are pale yellow, strongly suffused and streaked with orange and with a very broad dull purplish-fuscous oblique fascia, from the middle of the costa to the middle of the dorsum, the anterior edge limited by a fine fuscous, nearly straight line, the posterior edge dentate, the lowest dentation continued for a short distance along the fold. There is a fine fuscous line along the termen. The hindwings are pale yellowish orange.
