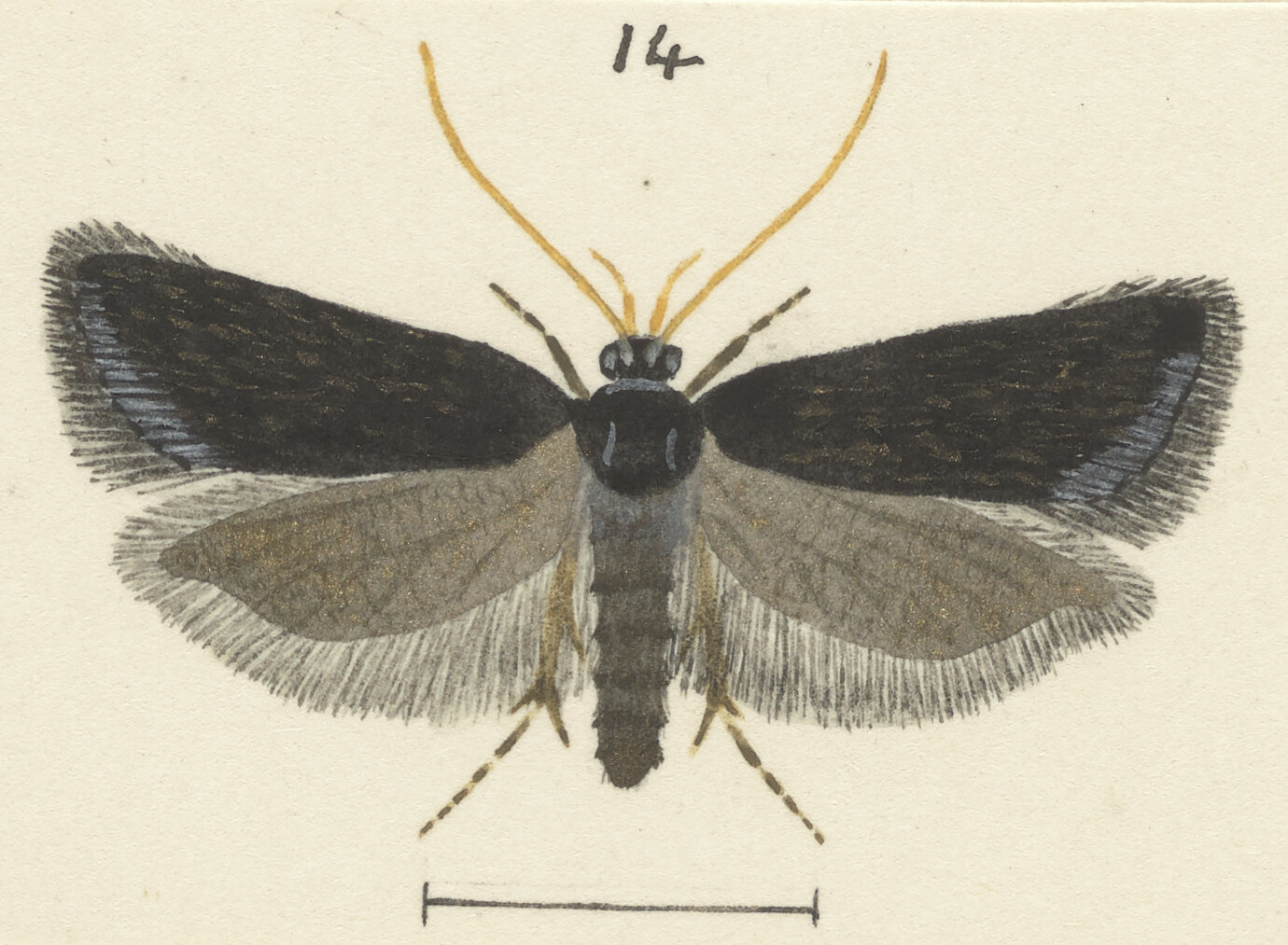

Scientific classification
- Domain: Eukaryota
- Kingdom: Animalia
- Phylum: Arthropoda
- Class: Insecta
- Order: Lepidoptera
- Family: Lecithoceridae
- Genus: Lecithocera
- Species: L. micromela

Binomial name
- Lecithocera micromela (Lower, 1897)

Synonyms
- Gelechia micromela Lower, 1897; Macrotona micromela

= Lecithocera micromela =

Species of moth in genus Lecithocera

Lecithocera micromela is a moth in the family Lecithoceridae. It was described by Oswald Bertram Lower in 1897. It is found in Australia and New Zealand.

The wingspan is about 10 mm. The forewings are shining deep purple blackish, without markings. The hindwings are blackish and thinly scaled.
