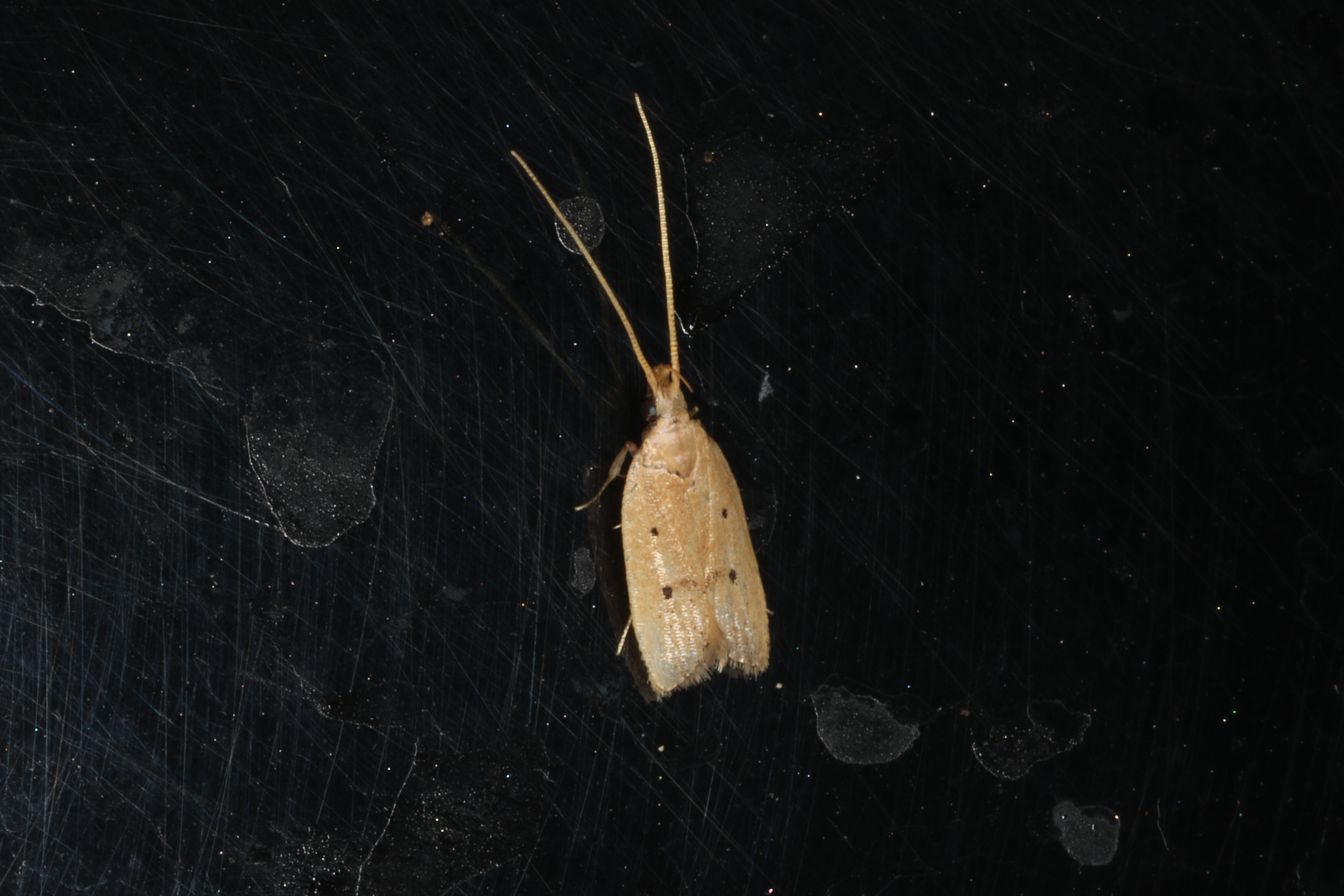
- Smithfield Regional Park, Queensland, 18 January 2016

Scientific classification
- Domain: Eukaryota
- Kingdom: Animalia
- Phylum: Arthropoda
- Class: Insecta
- Order: Lepidoptera
- Family: Lecithoceridae
- Genus: Lecithocera
- Species: L. concinna

Binomial name
- Lecithocera concinna (Turner, 1919)

Synonyms
- Styloceros concinna Turner, 1919

= Lecithocera concinna =

Species of moth in genus Lecithocera

Lecithocera concinna is a moth in the family Lecithoceridae. It was described by Alfred Jefferis Turner in 1919. It is found in Australia, where it has been recorded from Queensland.

The wingspan is about 12 mm. The forewings are pale ochreous-grey with the discal dots blackish, the first at one-fourth, the second before two-thirds and the plical obsolete. There is a terminal series of blackish dots. The hindwings are pale ochreous-grey.
