= Pacificulla zonias =

Scientific classification
- Kingdom: Animalia
- Phylum: Arthropoda
- Class: Insecta
- Order: Lepidoptera
- Family: Lecithoceridae
- Genus: Pacificulla
- Species: P. zonias

Binomial name
- Pacificulla zonias (Meyrick, 1904)

Synonyms
- Crocanthes zonias Meyrick, 1904

Species of moth

Pacificulla zonias is a moth in the family Lecithoceridae. It was described by Edward Meyrick in 1904. It is found in Australia, where it has been recorded from Queensland.

The wingspan is about 14 mm. The forewings are dark purple-fuscous with a moderately broad straight ochreous-yellow fascia about the middle, slightly narrowed downwards. The hindwings are dark grey with a rather broad irregular pale ochreous-yellow transverse fascia rather before the middle, enclosing a dark grey discal dot.
