= John Hartley Durrant =

English entomologist

John Hartley Durrant (10 January 1863 in Hitchin – 18 January 1928 in Putney) was an English entomologist who specialised in Lepidoptera.

Durrant was an authority on nomenclature. He was Lord Walsingham's secretary and had charge of his collections. When these were left to the Natural History Museum, Walsingham provided funds for Durrant to continue to curate them. He was author, with Lionel Walter Rothschild, of Lepidoptera of the British Ornithologists' Union and Wollaston Expeditions in the Snow Mountains, Southern Dutch New Guinea; Macrolepidoptera. Tring, Zoological Museum (1915) and many scientific papers on Lepidoptera.

In 1914 Durrant began a collaboration with Francis David Morice in a significant nomenclatural work entitled "The authorship and first publication of the "Jurinean" Genera of Hymenoptera: being a reprint of a long-lost work by Panzer, with a translation into English, an introduction, and bibliographical and critical notes". Transactions of the Entomological Society of London 1914:339-436 (corrections, additions Transactions of the Entomological Society of London 1916:432-442).

He was a fellow of the Royal Entomological Society.

His collections are divided between the Natural History Museum, London and the Hope Department at the Oxford University Museum of Natural History.
