= Onebala =

Scientific classification
- Kingdom: Animalia
- Phylum: Arthropoda
- Class: Insecta
- Order: Lepidoptera
- Family: Gelechiidae
- Subfamily: Dichomeridinae
- Genus: Onebala; Walker, 1864

Type species
- * Onebala blandiella Walker, 1864

Synonyms
- Dectobathra Meyrick, 1904

Genus of moths

Onebala is a genus of moths in the family Gelechiidae.

== Species ==
- Onebala amethystina (Meyrick, 1904) (from Australia)
- Onebala blandiella Walker, 1864 (from Sri Lanka)
- Onebala brunneotincta Janse, 1954 (from South Africa)
- Onebala choristis (Meyrick, 1904) (from Australia)
- Onebala euargyra (Turner, 1919) (from Australia)
- Onebala iridosoma (Meyrick, 1918) (from Australia)
- Onebala obsoleta Janse, 1954 (from South Africa, Namibia)
- Onebala probolaspis Meyrick, 1929 (from South Africa)
- Onebala semiluna Janse, 1954 (from South Africa)
- Onebala zapyrodes (Turner, 1919) (from Australia)
- Onebala zulu (Walsingham, 1881) (from South Africa, Namibia)

== Former species ==
- Onebala bifrenata Meyrick, 1921
- Onebala crypsizyga Meyrick, 1914
- Onebala cubiculata Meyrick, 1911
- Onebala elaphopis Meyrick, 1910
- Onebala eremota Meyrick, 1911
- Onebala hibisci (Stainton, 1859)
- Onebala homogramma Meyrick, 1918
- Onebala myadelpha Meyrick, 1910
