= Lecithocera levirota =

Scientific classification
- Kingdom: Animalia
- Phylum: Arthropoda
- Clade: Pancrustacea
- Class: Insecta
- Order: Lepidoptera
- Family: Lecithoceridae
- Genus: Lecithocera
- Species: L. levirota

Binomial name
- Lecithocera levirota Wu and Liu, 1993

Species of moth in genus Lecithocera

Lecithocera levirota is a moth in the family Lecithoceridae. It was described by Chun-Sheng Wu and You-Qiao Liu in 1993. It is found in Anhui, China.

The wingspan is about 17 mm. The species resembles Lecithocera ianthodes.
