= Opacoptera flavicana =

Scientific classification
- Kingdom: Animalia
- Phylum: Arthropoda
- Clade: Pancrustacea
- Class: Insecta
- Order: Lepidoptera
- Family: Lecithoceridae
- Genus: Opacoptera
- Species: O. flavicana

Binomial name
- Opacoptera flavicana Wu & Liu, 1992

Synonyms
- Opacoptera (Fulvitalia) flavicana Wu, 1996

Species of moth

Opacoptera flavicana is a moth in the family Lecithoceridae. It was described by Chun-Sheng Wu and You-Qiao Liu in 1992. It is found in China.
