= Olbothrepta =

Scientific classification
- Kingdom: Animalia
- Phylum: Arthropoda
- Class: Insecta
- Order: Lepidoptera
- Family: Lecithoceridae
- Genus: Olbothrepta; Meyrick, 1925

Genus of moths

Olbothrepta is a genus of moth in the family Lecithoceridae.

== Species ==
- Olbothrepta hydrosema (Meyrick, 1916)

== Former species ==
- Olbothrepta corythista (Meyrick, 1918)
- Olbothrepta sphaeristis (Meyrick, 1908)
