= Issikiopteryx corona =

Scientific classification
- Kingdom: Animalia
- Phylum: Arthropoda
- Clade: Pancrustacea
- Class: Insecta
- Order: Lepidoptera
- Family: Lecithoceridae
- Genus: Issikiopteryx
- Species: I. corona

Binomial name
- Issikiopteryx corona (C.S. Wu & Y.Q. Liu, 1993)

Synonyms
- Glaucolychna (Ephelochna) corona C.S. Wu & Y.Q. Liu, 1993

Species of moth

Issikiopteryx corona is a moth in the family Lecithoceridae. It is found in China (Fujian).
