= Cophomantella lychnocentra =

Scientific classification
- Domain: Eukaryota
- Kingdom: Animalia
- Phylum: Arthropoda
- Class: Insecta
- Order: Lepidoptera
- Family: Lecithoceridae
- Genus: Cophomantella
- Species: C. lychnocentra

Binomial name
- Cophomantella lychnocentra (Meyrick, 1904)

Synonyms
- Styloceros lychnocentra Meyrick, 1904

Species of moth

Cophomantella lychnocentra is a moth in the family Lecithoceridae. It was described by Edward Meyrick in 1904. It is found in Australia, where it has been recorded from the Northern Territory and Queensland.

The wingspan is about 15 mm (0.59 in). The forewings are dark purplish-bronzy fuscous with a transverse-oval spot of dark brown suffusion at two-fifths and a smaller transverse yellow-ochreous discal spot at two-thirds, edged with dark suffusion. The hindwings are rather dark bronzy fuscous.
