= Longipenis dentivalvus =

Scientific classification
- Kingdom: Animalia
- Phylum: Arthropoda
- Clade: Pancrustacea
- Class: Insecta
- Order: Lepidoptera
- Family: Lecithoceridae
- Genus: Longipenis
- Species: L. dentivalvus

Binomial name
- Longipenis dentivalvus H. Wang and M. Wang, 2010

Species of moth

Longipenis dentivalvus is a moth in the family Lecithoceridae. It is found in Guangdong, China.

The wingspan is 29–30 mm.
