= Lamprista emmeli =

Scientific classification
- Kingdom: Animalia
- Phylum: Arthropoda
- Class: Insecta
- Order: Lepidoptera
- Family: Lecithoceridae
- Genus: Lamprista
- Species: L. emmeli

Binomial name
- Lamprista emmeli Park & S. M. Lee, 2013

Species of moth

Lamprista emmeli is a moth in the family Lecithoceridae. It was described by Kyu-Tek Park and Sang-Mi Lee in 2013. It is found in Papua New Guinea.
