= Cophomantella bythota =

Scientific classification
- Domain: Eukaryota
- Kingdom: Animalia
- Phylum: Arthropoda
- Class: Insecta
- Order: Lepidoptera
- Family: Lecithoceridae
- Genus: Cophomantella
- Species: C. bythota

Binomial name
- Cophomantella bythota (Meyrick, 1916)

Synonyms
- Onebala bythota Meyrick, 1916

Species of moth

Cophomantella bythota is a moth in the family Lecithoceridae. It was described by Edward Meyrick in 1916. It is known from Ghana.

The wingspan is about 18 mm. The forewings are deep bronzy purple and the hindwings are dark fuscous.
