= Hyptiastis clematias =

Scientific classification
- Kingdom: Animalia
- Phylum: Arthropoda
- Class: Insecta
- Order: Lepidoptera
- Family: Lecithoceridae
- Genus: Hyptiastis
- Species: H. clematias

Binomial name
- Hyptiastis clematias Meyrick, 1911

Species of moth

Hyptiastis clematias is a moth in the family Lecithoceridae. It was described by Edward Meyrick in 1911. It is found in southern India.

The wingspan is 17–19 mm. The forewings are dark purplish fuscous with a whitish-ochreous dorsal stripe from the base to the tornus, in the middle with a broad triangular prominence reaching halfway across the wing, before the tornus with another triangular projection which is more or less suffused posteriorly. The hindwings are whitish ochreous, deeper tinged and with somewhat modified scales towards the base, veins 6 and 7 and a streak along the posterior two-thirds of the costa and apical portion of the termen are suffusedly dark fuscous, in females light grey, the dorsum is suffused with whitish ochreous and dark markings indicated as in males, but indistinct.
