= Cophomantella osphrantica =

Scientific classification
- Domain: Eukaryota
- Kingdom: Animalia
- Phylum: Arthropoda
- Class: Insecta
- Order: Lepidoptera
- Family: Lecithoceridae
- Genus: Cophomantella
- Species: C. osphrantica

Binomial name
- Cophomantella osphrantica (Meyrick, 1929)

Synonyms
- Cophomantis osphrantica Meyrick, 1929

Species of moth

Cophomantella osphrantica is a moth in the family Lecithoceridae. It was described by Edward Meyrick in 1929. It is known from Chennai, India.

The wingspan is about 16 mm.
