= Ethmia hunanensis =

Scientific classification
- Kingdom: Animalia
- Phylum: Arthropoda
- Clade: Pancrustacea
- Class: Insecta
- Order: Lepidoptera
- Family: Depressariidae
- Genus: Ethmia
- Species: E. hunanensis

Binomial name
- Ethmia hunanensis Y.-Q. Liu, 1980

Species of moth

Ethmia hunanensis is a moth in the family Depressariidae. It was described by You-Qiao Liu in 1980. It is found in Hunan, China.
