= Longipenis paradeltidius =

Scientific classification
- Domain: Eukaryota
- Kingdom: Animalia
- Phylum: Arthropoda
- Class: Insecta
- Order: Lepidoptera
- Family: Lecithoceridae
- Genus: Longipenis
- Species: L. paradeltidius

Binomial name
- Longipenis paradeltidius M. Wang and Xiong, 2010

Species of moth

Longipenis paradeltidius is a moth in the family Lecithoceridae. It is found in Guangxi, China.

The wingspan is 23 mm.
