= Phatnotis legata =

Scientific classification
- Kingdom: Animalia
- Phylum: Arthropoda
- Class: Insecta
- Order: Lepidoptera
- Family: Lecithoceridae
- Genus: Phatnotis
- Species: P. legata

Binomial name
- Phatnotis legata Meyrick, 1913

Species of moth

Phatnotis legata is a moth in the family Lecithoceridae. It was described by Edward Meyrick in 1913. It is found in southern India.

The wingspan is 21–23 mm. The forewings are fuscous, with a faint purplish tinge and with the costa slenderly ochreous yellowish, the edge dark fuscous towards the base. There are small fuscous spots on the costa at two-fifths and four-fifths and a whitish-ochreous irregular nearly straight line crossing the wing from immediately beyond the second costal spot to close before the tornus, terminal area beyond this paler and more or less suffused with whitish ochreous, except the terminal line. The hindwings are pale fuscous suffused with whitish ochreous anteriorly.
