= Phatnotis factiosa =

Scientific classification
- Kingdom: Animalia
- Phylum: Arthropoda
- Class: Insecta
- Order: Lepidoptera
- Family: Lecithoceridae
- Genus: Phatnotis
- Species: P. factiosa

Binomial name
- Phatnotis factiosa Meyrick, 1913

Species of moth

Phatnotis factiosa is a moth in the family Lecithoceridae. It was described by Edward Meyrick in 1913. It is found in southern India.

The wingspan is 21–22 mm. The forewings are light greyish ochreous more or less tinged with fuscous, the costal edge pale yellow ochreous, suffused beneath with whitish ochreous and with an indistinct slender irregular fascia of dark fuscous suffusion at two-fifths, interrupted above the middle. The second discal stigma is dark fuscous and there is a slender rather incurved fascia of dark fuscous suffusion from two-thirds of the costa to the dorsum before the tornus, dilated on the costa, edged posteriorly with ochreous whitish. The hindwings are pale ochreous, the termen tinged with fuscous.
