= Asmenistis semifracta =

Scientific classification
- Domain: Eukaryota
- Kingdom: Animalia
- Phylum: Arthropoda
- Class: Insecta
- Order: Lepidoptera
- Family: Lecithoceridae
- Genus: Asmenistis
- Species: A. semifracta

Binomial name
- Asmenistis semifracta Diakonoff, 1954

Species of moth

Asmenistis semifracta is a moth in the family Lecithoceridae, described by Alexey Diakonoff in 1954. It is found in New Guinea.
