= Olbothrepta hydrosema =

Scientific classification
- Kingdom: Animalia
- Phylum: Arthropoda
- Class: Insecta
- Order: Lepidoptera
- Family: Lecithoceridae
- Genus: Olbothrepta
- Species: O. hydrosema

Binomial name
- Olbothrepta hydrosema (Meyrick, 1916)

Synonyms
- Timyra hydrosema Meyrick, 1916

Species of moth

Olbothrepta hydrosema is a moth in the family Lecithoceridae. It is found in southern India.

The wingspan is 10–12 mm. The forewings are ochreous-yellow or ochreous, sometimes tinged with fuscous and with narrow irregular sometimes interrupted yellow-whitish or pale yellowish fasciae at one-third and beyond the middle, and an oblique discal mark between these. There is a rather inwardly oblique white transverse line from the costa at four-fifths, sometimes edged with dark fuscous irroration and a white apical elongate dot, one on the costa before it, and two on the termen. The hindwings are yellow-whitish, in males with the basal third of the costa clothed with long rough projecting ochreous-brown hairs.
