= Cosmopterix bifidiguttata =

Scientific classification
- Kingdom: Animalia
- Phylum: Arthropoda
- Clade: Pancrustacea
- Class: Insecta
- Order: Lepidoptera
- Family: Cosmopterigidae
- Genus: Cosmopterix
- Species: C. bifidiguttata

Binomial name
- Cosmopterix bifidiguttata Kuroko & Y.Q. Liu, 2005

Species of moth

Cosmopterix bifidiguttata is a moth of the family Cosmopterigidae. It is known from Jiangxi and Zhejiang, China.

The length of the forewings is about 4.6 mm. The larvae feed on a bamboo species.
