= Cophomantella cyclopodes =

Scientific classification
- Kingdom: Animalia
- Phylum: Arthropoda
- Class: Insecta
- Order: Lepidoptera
- Family: Lecithoceridae
- Genus: Cophomantella
- Species: C. cyclopodes

Binomial name
- Cophomantella cyclopodes (Meyrick, 1922)

Synonyms
- Onebala cyclopodes Meyrick, 1922

Species of moth

Cophomantella cyclopodes is a moth in the family Lecithoceridae. It was described by Edward Meyrick in 1922. It is known to exist in Tanzania.

The wingspan is about 14 mm (0.55 in). The forewings are dark purplish fuscous with a large rounded-transverse pale ochreous spot on the costa at three-fourths. The hindwings are dark grey.
