= Opacoptera ecbasta =

Scientific classification
- Kingdom: Animalia
- Phylum: Arthropoda
- Clade: Pancrustacea
- Class: Insecta
- Order: Lepidoptera
- Family: Lecithoceridae
- Genus: Opacoptera
- Species: O. ecbasta

Binomial name
- Opacoptera ecbasta Wu, 1996

Species of moth

Opacoptera ecbasta is a moth in the family Lecithoceridae. It was described by Chun-Sheng Wu in 1996. It is found in China.
