= Cophomantella pumicata =

Scientific classification
- Domain: Eukaryota
- Kingdom: Animalia
- Phylum: Arthropoda
- Class: Insecta
- Order: Lepidoptera
- Family: Lecithoceridae
- Genus: Cophomantella
- Species: C. pumicata

Binomial name
- Cophomantella pumicata (Meyrick, 1929)

Synonyms
- Cophomantis pumicata Meyrick, 1929

Species of moth

Cophomantella pumicata is a moth in the family Lecithoceridae. It was described by Edward Meyrick in 1929. It is known from Mumbai, India.

The wingspan is about 11 mm. The forewings are glossy light grey with the discal stigmata forming small cloudy dark grey spots, the second larger. The hindwings are pale grey.
