= Issikiopteryx =

Scientific classification
- Kingdom: Animalia
- Phylum: Arthropoda
- Class: Insecta
- Order: Lepidoptera
- Family: Lecithoceridae
- Subfamily: Lecithocerinae
- Genus: Issikiopteryx; Moriuti, 1973

Synonyms
- Glaucolychna Wu & Liu, 1993; Ephelochna Wu & Liu, 1993

Genus of moths

Issikiopteryx is a genus of moths in the family Lecithoceridae.

== Species ==
- Issikiopteryx aurolaxa (Wu & Liu, 1993)
- Issikiopteryx corona (C.S. Wu & Y.Q. Liu, 1993)
- Issikiopteryx corythista (Meyrick, 1918)
- Issikiopteryx fornicata (C.S. Wu & Y.Q. Liu, 1993)
- Issikiopteryx japonica Moriuti, 1973
- Issikiopteryx nigeriflava Liu & Wang, 2013
- Issikiopteryx obtusanglua Fan & Li, 2008
- Issikiopteryx ophrysa (Wu & Liu, 1993)
- Issikiopteryx parelongata Liu & Wang, 2013
- Issikiopteryx rotundiconcava Fan & Li, 2008
- Issikiopteryx sphaeristis (Meyrick, 1908)
- Issikiopteryx suiyangensis Liu & Wang, 2013
- Issikiopteryx taipingensis Park, 2003
- Issikiopteryx trichacera (Wu & Liu, 1993)
- Issikiopteryx valvispinata Fan & Li, 2008
- Issikiopteryx zonophaera (Meyrick, 1935)
