= Hyptiastis microcritha =

Scientific classification
- Domain: Eukaryota
- Kingdom: Animalia
- Phylum: Arthropoda
- Class: Insecta
- Order: Lepidoptera
- Family: Lecithoceridae
- Genus: Hyptiastis
- Species: H. microcritha

Binomial name
- Hyptiastis microcritha Diakonoff, 1954

Species of moth

Hyptiastis microcritha is a moth in the family Lecithoceridae. It was described by Alexey Diakonoff in 1954. It is found in New Guinea.
