= Opacoptera callirrhabda =

Scientific classification
- Kingdom: Animalia
- Phylum: Arthropoda
- Class: Insecta
- Order: Lepidoptera
- Family: Lecithoceridae
- Genus: Opacoptera
- Species: O. callirrhabda

Binomial name
- Opacoptera callirrhabda (Meyrick, 1936)

Synonyms
- Lecithocera callirrhabda Meyrick, 1936

Species of moth

Opacoptera callirrhabda is a moth in the family Lecithoceridae. It was described by Edward Meyrick in 1936. It is found in China.
