= Cophomantella artonoma =

Scientific classification
- Domain: Eukaryota
- Kingdom: Animalia
- Phylum: Arthropoda
- Class: Insecta
- Order: Lepidoptera
- Family: Lecithoceridae
- Genus: Cophomantella
- Species: C. artonoma

Binomial name
- Cophomantella artonoma (Meyrick, 1936)

Synonyms
- Cophomantis artonoma Meyrick, 1926

Species of moth

Cophomantella artonoma is a moth in the family Lecithoceridae. It was described by Edward Meyrick in 1936. It is known from the Democratic Republic of the Congo.
