= Hannara gentis =

Scientific classification
- Kingdom: Animalia
- Phylum: Arthropoda
- Clade: Pancrustacea
- Class: Insecta
- Order: Lepidoptera
- Family: Lecithoceridae
- Genus: Hannara
- Species: H. gentis

Binomial name
- Hannara gentis Park, 2013

Species of moth

Hannara gentis is a moth in the family Lecithoceridae. It was described by Kyu-Tek Park in 2013. It is found in Papua New Guinea.
