= Issikiopteryx nigeriflava =

Scientific classification
- Domain: Eukaryota
- Kingdom: Animalia
- Phylum: Arthropoda
- Class: Insecta
- Order: Lepidoptera
- Family: Lecithoceridae
- Genus: Issikiopteryx
- Species: I. nigeriflava

Binomial name
- Issikiopteryx nigeriflava Liu & Wang, 2013

Species of moth

Issikiopteryx nigeriflava is a moth in the family Lecithoceridae. It is found in China (Tibet).
