= Cophomantella syngonarcha =

Scientific classification
- Domain: Eukaryota
- Kingdom: Animalia
- Phylum: Arthropoda
- Class: Insecta
- Order: Lepidoptera
- Family: Lecithoceridae
- Genus: Cophomantella
- Species: C. syngonarcha

Binomial name
- Cophomantella syngonarcha (Meyrick, 1926)

Synonyms
- Cophomantis syngonarcha Meyrick, 1926

Species of moth

Cophomantella syngonarcha is a moth in the family Lecithoceridae. It was described by Edward Meyrick in 1926. It is known from Uganda.

The wingspan is about 28 mm. The forewings are dark violet fuscous with a faint ochreous-whitish dot on the costa at three-fourths. The hindwings are dark grey.
