= Cosmopterix nanshanella =

Scientific classification
- Kingdom: Animalia
- Phylum: Arthropoda
- Clade: Pancrustacea
- Class: Insecta
- Order: Lepidoptera
- Family: Cosmopterigidae
- Genus: Cosmopterix
- Species: C. nanshanella

Binomial name
- Cosmopterix nanshanella Kuroko & Y.Q. Liu, 2005

Species of moth

Cosmopterix nanshanella is a moth of the family Cosmopterigidae. It is known from Zhejiang, China.

The length of the forewings is about 6 mm (male holotype).
