= Issikiopteryx suiyangensis =

Scientific classification
- Domain: Eukaryota
- Kingdom: Animalia
- Phylum: Arthropoda
- Class: Insecta
- Order: Lepidoptera
- Family: Lecithoceridae
- Genus: Issikiopteryx
- Species: I. suiyangensis

Binomial name
- Issikiopteryx suiyangensis Liu & Wang, 2013

Species of moth

Issikiopteryx suiyangensis is a moth in the family Lecithoceridae. It is found in China (Guizhou).
