= Issikiopteryx rotundiconcava =

Scientific classification
- Kingdom: Animalia
- Phylum: Arthropoda
- Class: Insecta
- Order: Lepidoptera
- Family: Lecithoceridae
- Genus: Issikiopteryx
- Species: I. rotundiconcava

Binomial name
- Issikiopteryx rotundiconcava Fan & Li, 2008

Species of moth

Issikiopteryx rotundiconcava is a moth in the family Lecithoceridae. It is found in China (Sichuan).
