= Cophomantella alphanozoma =

Scientific classification
- Domain: Eukaryota
- Kingdom: Animalia
- Phylum: Arthropoda
- Class: Insecta
- Order: Lepidoptera
- Family: Lecithoceridae
- Genus: Cophomantella
- Species: C. alphanozoma

Binomial name
- Cophomantella alphanozoma (Meyrick, 1926)

Synonyms
- Cophomantis alphanozoma Meyrick, 1926

Species of moth

Cophomantella alphanozoma is a moth in the family Lecithoceridae. It was described by Edward Meyrick in 1926. It is known from Sierra Leone and Uganda.

The wingspan is 15–16 mm. The forewings are dark purplish-slaty fuscous with undefined slightly oblique fasciae of blackish suffusion about one-third and two-thirds, disappearing in oblique lights, the second followed by an ochreous-whitish spot on the costa at three-fourths. The hindwings are rather dark grey.
