= Issikiopteryx taipingensis =

Scientific classification
- Kingdom: Animalia
- Phylum: Arthropoda
- Class: Insecta
- Order: Lepidoptera
- Family: Lecithoceridae
- Genus: Issikiopteryx
- Species: I. taipingensis

Binomial name
- Issikiopteryx taipingensis Park, 2003

Species of moth

Issikiopteryx taipingensis is a moth in the family Lecithoceridae that is endemic to Taiwan.
