= Cophomantella furnaria =

Scientific classification
- Domain: Eukaryota
- Kingdom: Animalia
- Phylum: Arthropoda
- Class: Insecta
- Order: Lepidoptera
- Family: Lecithoceridae
- Genus: Cophomantella
- Species: C. furnaria

Binomial name
- Cophomantella furnaria (Meyrick, 1913)

Synonyms
- Lecithocera furnaria Meyrick, 1913; Lecithocera jurnaria

Species of moth

Cophomantella furnaria is a moth in the family Lecithoceridae. It was described by Edward Meyrick in 1913. It is known from South Africa.

The wingspan is 12–13 mm. The forewings are dark fuscous with a whitish-ochreous antemedian fascia, straight and sharply defined anteriorly, broadly suffused posteriorly, followed by a blackish-fuscous discal dot. The posterior area is lighter and somewhat sprinkled with whitish ochreous, with a whitish-ochreous line running from the costa about three-fourths to the dorsum before the tornus, angulated inwards above the middle and outwards in the middle, well-defined anteriorly but more or less suffused posteriorly, forming a spot or patch on the costa. The hindwings are whitish ochreous, more or less infuscated (darkened) towards the apex.
