= Issikiopteryx japonica =

Scientific classification
- Kingdom: Animalia
- Phylum: Arthropoda
- Class: Insecta
- Order: Lepidoptera
- Family: Lecithoceridae
- Genus: Issikiopteryx
- Species: I. japonica

Binomial name
- Issikiopteryx japonica Moriuti, 1973

Species of moth

Issikiopteryx japonica is a moth in the family Lecithoceridae. It is found in Japan.
