= Issikiopteryx zonophaera =

Scientific classification
- Kingdom: Animalia
- Phylum: Arthropoda
- Class: Insecta
- Order: Lepidoptera
- Family: Lecithoceridae
- Genus: Issikiopteryx
- Species: I. zonophaera

Binomial name
- Issikiopteryx zonophaera (Meyrick, 1935)

Synonyms
- Olbothrepta zonophaera Meyrick, 1935

Species of moth

Issikiopteryx zonophaera is a moth in the family Lecithoceridae. It is found in Taiwan and eastern Zhejiang, China.
