= Longipenis deltidius =

Scientific classification
- Kingdom: Animalia
- Phylum: Arthropoda
- Clade: Pancrustacea
- Class: Insecta
- Order: Lepidoptera
- Family: Lecithoceridae
- Genus: Longipenis
- Species: L. deltidius

Binomial name
- Longipenis deltidius Wu, 1994

Species of moth

Longipenis deltidius is a moth in the family Lecithoceridae. It is found in Fujian, China.
