= Cosmopterix baihashanella =

Scientific classification
- Kingdom: Animalia
- Phylum: Arthropoda
- Clade: Pancrustacea
- Class: Insecta
- Order: Lepidoptera
- Family: Cosmopterigidae
- Genus: Cosmopterix
- Species: C. baihashanella

Binomial name
- Cosmopterix baihashanella Kuroko & Y.Q. Liu, 2005

Species of moth

Cosmopterix baihashanella is a moth of the family Cosmopterigidae. It is known from Beijing, China.

The length of the forewings is about 5.3 mm (male holotype).
