= Asmenistis stephanocoma =

Scientific classification
- Domain: Eukaryota
- Kingdom: Animalia
- Phylum: Arthropoda
- Class: Insecta
- Order: Lepidoptera
- Family: Lecithoceridae
- Genus: Asmenistis
- Species: A. stephanocoma

Binomial name
- Asmenistis stephanocoma Meyrick, 1938

Species of moth

Asmenistis stephanocoma is a moth in the family Lecithoceridae. It was described by Edward Meyrick in 1938. It is found in the former Orientale Province of the Democratic Republic of the Congo.
