= Merocrates =

Scientific classification
- Kingdom: Animalia
- Phylum: Arthropoda
- Class: Insecta
- Order: Lepidoptera
- Family: Lecithoceridae
- Genus: Merocrates; Meyrick, 1931
- Species: M. themelias

Binomial name
- Merocrates themelias Meyrick, 1931

Genus of moths

Merocrates is a monotypic moth genus in the family Lecithoceridae. Its single species, Merocrates themelias, is found on New Guinea. Both the genus and species were first described by Edward Meyrick in 1931.
