= Scythostola =

Scientific classification
- Kingdom: Animalia
- Phylum: Arthropoda
- Class: Insecta
- Order: Lepidoptera
- Family: Lecithoceridae
- Genus: Scythostola; Meyrick, 1925
- Species: S. heptagramma

Binomial name
- Scythostola heptagramma Meyrick, 1925

Genus of moths

Scythostola is a genus of moth in the family Lecithoceridae. It contains the species Scythostola heptagramma, which is found in Indonesia (Java).
