= Cophomantella =

Scientific classification
- Kingdom: Animalia
- Phylum: Arthropoda
- Clade: Pancrustacea
- Class: Insecta
- Order: Lepidoptera
- Family: Lecithoceridae
- Genus: Cophomantella; T. B. Fletcher, 1940 (repl. name)

Synonyms
- Cophomantis Meyrick, 1925

Genus of moths

Cophomantella is a genus of moths in the family Lecithoceridae described by Thomas Bainbrigge Fletcher in 1940. The name of this genus is a replacement name for Cophomantis Meyrick.

== Species ==
- Cophomantella alphanozoma (Meyrick, 1926) (Sierra Leone and Uganda)
- Cophomantella artonoma (Meyrick, 1936) (from Congo)
- Cophomantella bifrenata (Meyrick, 1921) (South Africa and Tanzania)
- Cophomantella bythota (Meyrick, 1916) (Ghana)
- Cophomantella crypsizyga (Meyrick, 1914) (from Malawi)
- Cophomantella cubiculata (Meyrick, 1911) (Seychelles)
- Cophomantella cyclopodes (Meyrick, 1922) (from Tanzania)
- Cophomantella elaphopis (Meyrick, 1910) (India)
- Cophomantella eremota (Meyrick, 1911) (Sri Lanka)
- Cophomantella furnaria (Meyrick, 1913) (from South Africa)
- Cophomantella homogramma (Meyrick, 1918) (from South Africa)
- Cophomantella lychnocentra (Meyrick, 1904) (Tasmania)
- Cophomantella myadelpha (Meyrick, 1910) (India)
- Cophomantella osphrantica (Meyrick, 1929) (India)
- Cophomantella pumicata (Meyrick, 1929) (India)
- Cophomantella syngonarcha (Meyrick, 1926) (from Uganda)
