= Monerista =

Scientific classification
- Kingdom: Animalia
- Phylum: Arthropoda
- Class: Insecta
- Order: Lepidoptera
- Family: Lecithoceridae
- Genus: Monerista; Meyrick, 1925
- Species: M. hippastis

Binomial name
- Monerista hippastis (Meyrick, 1908)

Synonyms
- Timyra hippastis Meyrick, 1908

Genus of moths

Monerista is a genus of moth in the family Lecithoceridae. It contains the species Monerista hippastis, which is found in India (Assam).

The wingspan is 10–12 mm. The forewings are ochreous-yellow in males and white more or less suffused with ochreous-yellow, especially on margins in females. There is a small deep yellow basal patch, in males containing a large tuft of raised scales. There is a broad deep ochreous-yellow or yellow-brown fasciae before middle and about three-fourths, confluent on the dorsum. The apex are deep yellow or yellow-brown. The hindwings are dark grey in males, with a submedian streak thinly scaled and yellowish-tinged. The hindwings of the females are whitish.
