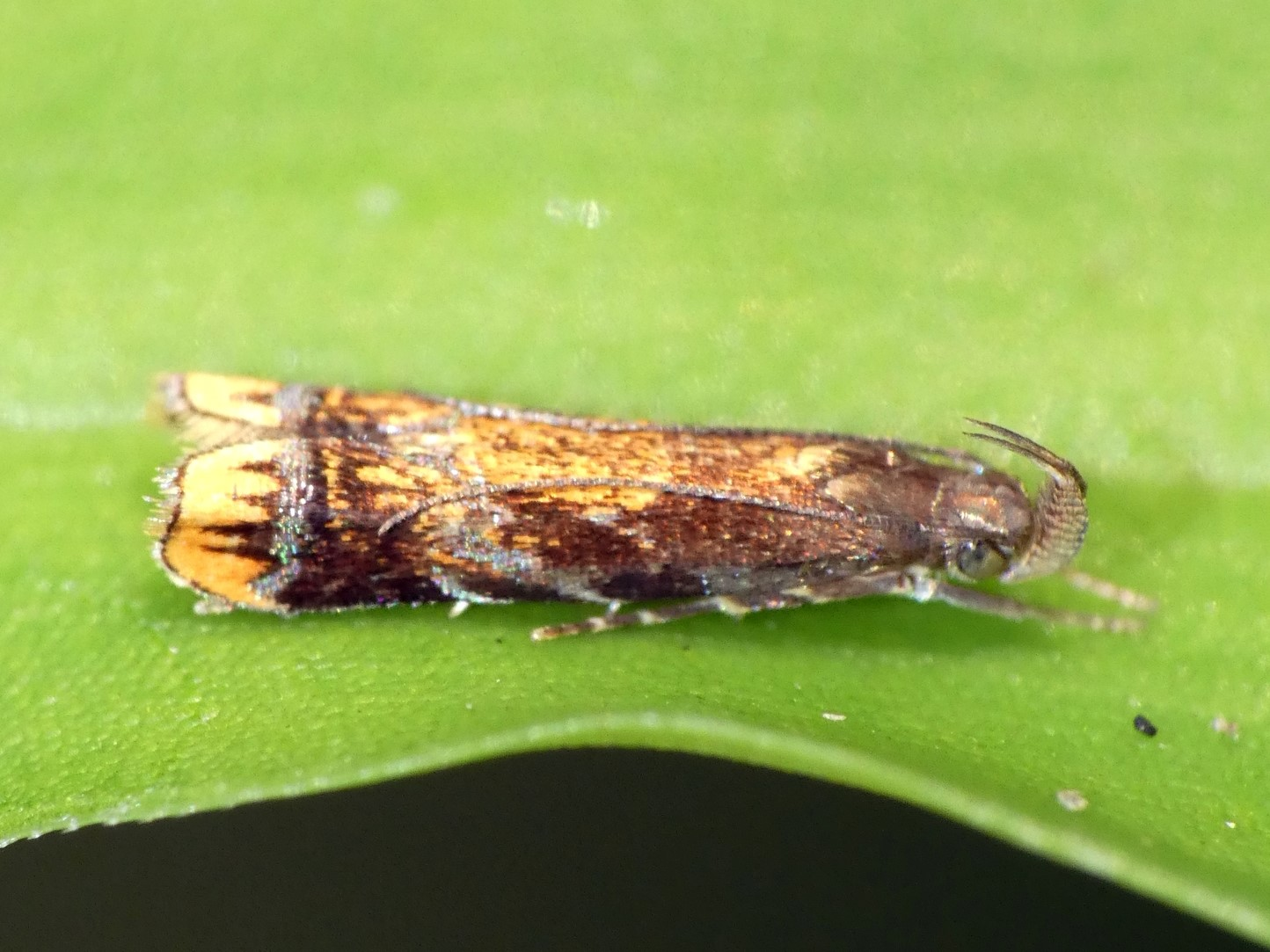

Scientific classification
- Kingdom: Animalia
- Phylum: Arthropoda
- Clade: Pancrustacea
- Class: Insecta
- Order: Lepidoptera
- Family: Gelechiidae
- Genus: Onebala
- Species: O. zapyrodes

Binomial name
- Onebala zapyrodes (Turner, 1919)

Synonyms
- Helcystogramma zapyrodes Turner, 1919

= Onebala zapyrodes =

Species of moth

Onebala zapyrodes is a species of moth in the family Gelechiidae. It was first described by Alfred Jefferis Turner in 1919. The species is found in Australia, where it has been recorded from Queensland.

== Description ==
The wingspan is 10 mm. The forewings are fuscous with an orange dorsal patch containing some fuscous scales and three oblique leaden-metallic lines from the costa: the first near the base, the second at one-third, the third from the middle. The second line is longer, acutely angled in the disc, and extending to the dorsal patch, while the third line gives off a fine orange line to the tornus, obtusely bent in the disc, and preceded by two or three longitudinal orange streaks. There is a leaden-metallic transverse line from the tornus to the angle of the costa. Beyond this is an orange apical patch partly traversed by some black lines from the anterior edge. There is also a black terminal line. The hindwings are dark-fuscous and suffusedly orange towards the base.
