= Cophomantella cubiculata =

Scientific classification
- Domain: Eukaryota
- Kingdom: Animalia
- Phylum: Arthropoda
- Class: Insecta
- Order: Lepidoptera
- Family: Lecithoceridae
- Genus: Cophomantella
- Species: C. cubiculata

Binomial name
- Cophomantella cubiculata (Meyrick, 1911)

Synonyms
- Onebala cubiculata Meyrick, 1911

Species of moth

Cophomantella cubiculata is a moth in the family Lecithoceridae. It was described by Edward Meyrick in 1911. It is known from the Seychelles (Silhouette).

The wingspan is 12–13 mm. The forewings are fuscous with a dark fuscous basal patch occupying two-fifths of the wing, edged by an irregularly sinuate cloudy line of whitish-ochreous suffusion. The second discal stigma is well marked, transverse and dark fuscous and there is a small whitish spot on the costa at four-fifths, where an irregularly sinuate cloudy whitish-ochreous line runs to the dorsum before the tornus. The hindwings are grey.
