= Stryphnocopa =

Scientific classification
- Kingdom: Animalia
- Phylum: Arthropoda
- Class: Insecta
- Order: Lepidoptera
- Family: Lecithoceridae
- Genus: Stryphnocopa; Meyrick, 1920
- Species: S. trinotata

Binomial name
- Stryphnocopa trinotata Meyrick, 1920

Genus of moths

Stryphnocopa is a genus of moth in the family Lecithoceridae. It contains the species Stryphnocopa trinotata, which is found in India (Assam).

The wingspan is about 12 mm. The forewings are whitish-ochreous. The stigmata are black, the plical hardly beyond the first discal, the second discal round and rather larger. There are three small oblique black spots on the posterior half of the costa and a terminal patch of brownish-ochreous suffusion, broadest downwards and just reaching the second discal stigma. There are also several indistinct dark fuscous terminal dots. The hindwings are pale greyish.
