= Cynicostola =

Scientific classification
- Kingdom: Animalia
- Phylum: Arthropoda
- Class: Insecta
- Order: Lepidoptera
- Family: Lecithoceridae
- Genus: Cynicostola; Meyrick, 1925
- Species: C. pogonias

Binomial name
- Cynicostola pogonias (Meyrick, 1923)

Synonyms
- Onebala pogonias Meyrick, 1923

Genus of moths

Cynicostola is a monotypic genus of moth in the family Lecithoceridae. It contains the species Cynicostola pogonias, which is found in southern India.

The wingspan is about 18 mm. The forewings are purplish-fuscous irregularly irrorated darker and the scale tips are minutely whitish. The stigmata form small irregular dark fuscous spots, the plical rather beyond the first discal, connected with it and with the costa at one-fifth by oblique dark fuscous suffusion, edged posteriorly by an ochreous-whitish streak obtusely angulated on the fold and reaching the dorsum, the second discal whitish-ringed. There is a small ochreous-whitish spot on the costa at four-fifths, where an obscurely indicated line, angulated first inwards and then outwards, runs to the tornus. The hindwings are grey.
