= Aproparia =

Scientific classification
- Kingdom: Animalia
- Phylum: Arthropoda
- Clade: Pancrustacea
- Class: Insecta
- Order: Lepidoptera
- Family: Lecithoceridae
- Genus: Aproparia; Gozmány, 1972
- Species: A. pselaphistis

Binomial name
- Aproparia pselaphistis (Meyrick, 1910)

Synonyms
- Onebala pselaphistis Meyrick, 1910

Genus of moths

Aproparia is a monotypic genus of moth in the family Lecithoceridae. It contains the species Aproparia pselaphistis, which is found in India (Assam).

The wingspan is 14–18 mm. The forewings are light brownish-ochreous, more or less infuscated posteriorly. The stigmata are small, cloudy and fuscous, the plical rather beyond the first discal, an additional dot beneath the second discal. There is a faint curved fine ochreous-whitish line from three-fourths of the costa to the dorsum before the tornus, more strongly marked towards the costa. The hindwings are grey, more or less tinged with whitish-ochreous.
