= Onebala iridosoma =

Scientific classification
- Kingdom: Animalia
- Phylum: Arthropoda
- Class: Insecta
- Order: Lepidoptera
- Family: Gelechiidae
- Genus: Onebala
- Species: O. iridosoma

Binomial name
- Onebala iridosoma (Meyrick, 1918)

Synonyms
- Helcystogramma iridosoma Meyrick, 1918

Species of moth

Onebala iridosoma is a moth in the family Gelechiidae. It was described by Edward Meyrick in 1918. It is found in Australia, where it has been recorded from Queensland.

The wingspan is 11–12 mm. The forewings are dark fuscous with three irregular pale blue-metallic transverse streaks, obtusely angulated and interrupted above the middle, the first from near the base of the costa to one-third of the dorsum, the second from one-third of the costa to beyond the middle of the dorsum, the third from three-fifths of the costa to two-thirds of the dorsum, the two latter with white on the costal edge. There is some brownish-ochreous suffusion between these on the subdorsal area, as well as a curved brownish-ochreous line from above the middle of the third streak to four-fifths of the dorsum. There is also a violet-silvery metallic subterminal streak, angulated above the middle and indented between this and the costa. The apical and terminal area beyond this is brownish ochreous, with four blackish longitudinal marks, and a black marginal line. The hindwings are blackish grey, lighter anteriorly.
