= Cophomantella elaphopis =

Scientific classification
- Domain: Eukaryota
- Kingdom: Animalia
- Phylum: Arthropoda
- Class: Insecta
- Order: Lepidoptera
- Family: Lecithoceridae
- Genus: Cophomantella
- Species: C. elaphopis

Binomial name
- Cophomantella elaphopis (Meyrick, 1910)

Synonyms
- Onebala elaphopis Meyrick, 1910

Species of moth

Cophomantella elaphopis is a moth in the family Lecithoceridae. It was described by Edward Meyrick in 1910. It is known from Assam, India.

The wingspan is 18–20 mm. The forewings are dark shining bronzy brown with the discal stigmata large, cloudy and dark purple fuscous. The hindwings are rather dark grey.
