= Onebala brunneotincta =

Scientific classification
- Domain: Eukaryota
- Kingdom: Animalia
- Phylum: Arthropoda
- Class: Insecta
- Order: Lepidoptera
- Family: Gelechiidae
- Genus: Onebala
- Species: O. brunneotincta

Binomial name
- Onebala brunneotincta Janse, 1954

Species of moth

Onebala brunneotincta is a moth in the family Gelechiidae. It was described by Anthonie Johannes Theodorus Janse in 1954. It is found in Namibia and South Africa.
