= Sphaerolbia =

Scientific classification
- Kingdom: Animalia
- Phylum: Arthropoda
- Class: Insecta
- Order: Lepidoptera
- Family: Lecithoceridae
- Genus: Sphaerolbia; Meyrick, 1934
- Species: S. chrematistis

Binomial name
- Sphaerolbia chrematistis Meyrick, 1934

Genus of moths

Sphaerolbia is a genus of moth in the family Lecithoceridae. It contains the species Sphaerolbia chrematistis, which is found in India (Assam).
