= Malachoherca =

Scientific classification
- Kingdom: Animalia
- Phylum: Arthropoda
- Class: Insecta
- Order: Lepidoptera
- Family: Lecithoceridae
- Genus: Malachoherca; Wu, 1994
- Species: M. ardensa

Binomial name
- Malachoherca ardensa Wu, 1994

Genus of moths

Malachoherca is a genus of moth in the family Lecithoceridae. It contains the species Malachoherca ardensa, which is found in China (Sichuan).
