= Phatnotis =

Scientific classification
- Kingdom: Animalia
- Phylum: Arthropoda
- Class: Insecta
- Order: Lepidoptera
- Family: Lecithoceridae
- Genus: Phatnotis; Meyrick, 1913

Genus of moths

Phatnotis is a genus of moth in the family Lecithoceridae.

== Species ==
- Phatnotis factiosa Meyrick, 1913
- Phatnotis legata Meyrick, 1913
