= Onebala blandiella =

Scientific classification
- Kingdom: Animalia
- Phylum: Arthropoda
- Class: Insecta
- Order: Lepidoptera
- Family: Gelechiidae
- Genus: Onebala
- Species: O. blandiella

Binomial name
- Onebala blandiella Walker, 1864

Species of moth

Onebala blandiella is a moth in the family Gelechiidae. It was described by Francis Walker in 1864. It is found in Sri Lanka, India and Myanmar.

Adults are fawn coloured with a slight cinereous (ash-grey) tinge, the forewings with slight metallic-green reflections and a large oblong dark brown cinereous-bordered spot in the disc before the middle, as well as a very large exterior triangular dark brown cinereous-bordered spot, which has its base on the costa and extends to the interior border. The hindwings are slightly gilded.

The larvae roll the leaves of Lamium species.
