= Philarachnis =

Scientific classification
- Kingdom: Animalia
- Phylum: Arthropoda
- Class: Insecta
- Order: Lepidoptera
- Family: Lecithoceridae
- Genus: Philarachnis; Meyrick, 1925
- Species: P. xerophaga

Binomial name
- Philarachnis xerophaga (Meyrick, 1914)

Synonyms
- Brachmia xerophaga Meyrick, 1914

Genus of moths

Philarachnis is a genus of moth in the family Lecithoceridae. It contains the species Philarachnis xerophaga, which is found in India and Sri Lanka.

The wingspan is 11–12 mm. The forewings are ochreous-whitish or pale whitish ochreous, sometimes finely sprinkled with fuscous. There is a slender fulvous-ochreous streak along the costa throughout, sometimes suffused with dark fuscous towards the base. An oblique dark fuscous streak is found from the dorsum near the base, reaching nearly to the costa. The first discal stigma is moderate and blackish, the plical very small and dark fuscous, slightly beyond it. There is a somewhat inwards-curved dark fuscous streak from beneath three-fourths of the costa to four-fifths of the dorsum. There is a submarginal series of partially confluent blackish dots around the posterior fourth of the costa and termen, followed by a suffused white line, and preceded in the apical angle by a spot of dark fuscous suffusion. The hindwings are light grey.

Larvae have been found in the nests of Stegodyphus spiders and probably feed on the fragments of the insects caught in the webs. The larvae are dark red. Pupation also takes place in the spiders nest.
