= Lamprista =

Scientific classification
- Kingdom: Animalia
- Phylum: Arthropoda
- Class: Insecta
- Order: Lepidoptera
- Family: Lecithoceridae
- Subfamily: Crocanthinae
- Genus: Lamprista; Park & Lee, 2013

Genus of moths

Lamprista is a genus of moths in the family Lecithoceridae.

== Species ==
- Lamprista emmeli Park & Lee, 2013
- Lamprista ortholepida Park & Lee, 2013
