= Proesochtha =

Scientific classification
- Kingdom: Animalia
- Phylum: Arthropoda
- Class: Insecta
- Order: Lepidoptera
- Family: Lecithoceridae
- Genus: Proesochtha; Wu, 1994
- Species: P. loxosa

Binomial name
- Proesochtha loxosa Wu, 1994

Genus of moths

Proesochtha is a genus of moth in the family Lecithoceridae. It contains the species Proesochtha loxosa, which is found in China (Fujian).
