= Cophomantella bifrenata =

Scientific classification
- Domain: Eukaryota
- Kingdom: Animalia
- Phylum: Arthropoda
- Class: Insecta
- Order: Lepidoptera
- Family: Lecithoceridae
- Genus: Cophomantella
- Species: C. bifrenata

Binomial name
- Cophomantella bifrenata (Meyrick, 1921)

Synonyms
- Onebala bifrenata Meyrick, 1921

Species of moth

Cophomantella bifrenata is a moth in the family Lecithoceridae. It was described by Edward Meyrick in 1921 and is found in South Africa and Tanzania.

The wingspan is about 13 mm. The forewings are dark purple fuscous with a direct transverse whitish-ochreous streak at two-fifths, the posterior edge suffused especially on the upper half, and extended as a slender streak along the costa to beyond the middle. There is a cloudy whitish-ochreous line from a spot on the costa at three-fourths to the dorsum before the tornus, sinuate inwards above and outwards below the middle. The hindwings are pale greyish.
