= Cophomantella myadelpha =

Scientific classification
- Domain: Eukaryota
- Kingdom: Animalia
- Phylum: Arthropoda
- Class: Insecta
- Order: Lepidoptera
- Family: Lecithoceridae
- Genus: Cophomantella
- Species: C. myadelpha

Binomial name
- Cophomantella myadelpha (Meyrick, 1910)

Synonyms
- Onebala myadelpha Meyrick, 1910

Species of moth

Cophomantella myadelpha is a moth in the family Lecithoceridae. It was described by Edward Meyrick in 1910. It is known from Assam, India and southern India.

Their wingspan are 15–19 mm. Their forewings are a light bronze. Their stigmata are large, cloudy and rather dark purple fuscous, their plical somewhat before the first discal. Their hindwings are grey.
