= Sisyrodonta =

Scientific classification
- Kingdom: Animalia
- Phylum: Arthropoda
- Class: Insecta
- Order: Lepidoptera
- Family: Lecithoceridae
- Genus: Sisyrodonta; Meyrick, 1922
- Species: S. ochrosidera

Binomial name
- Sisyrodonta ochrosidera Meyrick, 1922

Genus of moths

Sisyrodonta is a genus of moth in the family Lecithoceridae. It contains the species Sisyrodonta ochrosidera, it is found in Australia, where it has been recorded from Western Australia.

The wingspan is about 17 mm. The forewings are dark indigo-blue-fuscous with a rather broad irregular yellow-ochreous median fascia not quite reaching the costa or dorsum. There is a rather large yellow-ochreous spot on the costa at four-fifths, and smaller irregular one on the dorsum opposite. The hindwings are pale yellow-ochreous.
