= Cophomantella eremota =

Scientific classification
- Domain: Eukaryota
- Kingdom: Animalia
- Phylum: Arthropoda
- Class: Insecta
- Order: Lepidoptera
- Family: Lecithoceridae
- Genus: Cophomantella
- Species: C. eremota

Binomial name
- Cophomantella eremota (Meyrick, 1911)

Synonyms
- Onebala eremota Meyrick, 1911

Species of moth

Cophomantella eremota is a moth in the family Lecithoceridae. It was described by Turner in Meyrick in 1911. It is known from Sri Lanka.

The wingspan is 15–17 mm. The forewings are light glossy bronzy-fuscous, with the veins slightly darker. The hindwings are pale grey.
