= Onebala choristis =

Scientific classification
- Kingdom: Animalia
- Phylum: Arthropoda
- Class: Insecta
- Order: Lepidoptera
- Family: Gelechiidae
- Genus: Onebala
- Species: O. choristis

Binomial name
- Onebala choristis (Meyrick, 1904)

Synonyms
- Dectobathra choristis Meyrick, 1904

Species of moth

Onebala choristis is a moth in the family Gelechiidae. It was described by Edward Meyrick in 1904. It is found in Australia, where it has been recorded from Western Australia, New South Wales and Queensland.

The wingspan is 11–13 mm (0.43–0.51 in). The forewings are dark bronzy fuscous with a rather broad suffused bronzy-ochreous dorsal streak from the base to beyond the middle. There are three violet-silvery-metallic transverse lines, white towards the costa, the first from two-fifths of the costa to beyond the middle of the dorsum, obtusely angulated in the middle, indented beneath this, the second from middle of the costa to two-thirds of the dorsum, dilated towards the costa, somewhat bent in the middle. The third from four-fifths of the costa to the dorsum before the tornus, rather irregular. There is also a whitish-ochreous tornal patch, containing two black dashes. The hindwings are grey, becoming dark grey posteriorly. There are two cloudy white opposite spots beyond the middle sometimes distinct, more usually faint or obsolete.
