= Issikiopteryx corythista =

Scientific classification
- Kingdom: Animalia
- Phylum: Arthropoda
- Class: Insecta
- Order: Lepidoptera
- Family: Lecithoceridae
- Genus: Issikiopteryx
- Species: I. corythista

Binomial name
- Issikiopteryx corythista (Meyrick, 1918)

Synonyms
- Timyra corythista Meyrick, 1918; Olbothrepta corythista

Species of moth

Issikiopteryx corythista is a moth in the family Lecithoceridae. It is found in India.

The wingspan is 13 mm. The forewings are orange-yellow with light bronzy-fuscous markings and a streak along the basal sixth of the costa, a small blackish spot beneath it at the base and a slightly oblique transverse fascia at one-third, not quite reaching the costa. There is also a patch occupying the apical half of the wing, the anterior edge somewhat convex, including a yellow spot above the tornus. The hindwings are pale ochreous, with a long expansible pale ochreous hairpencil from the base, lying in a submedian furrow.
