= Galoxestis =

Scientific classification
- Kingdom: Animalia
- Phylum: Arthropoda
- Class: Insecta
- Order: Lepidoptera
- Family: Lecithoceridae
- Genus: Galoxestis; Wu, 1994
- Species: G. sarmenta

Binomial name
- Galoxestis sarmenta Wu, 1994

Genus of moths

Galoxestis is a genus of moth in the family Lecithoceridae. It contains the species Galoxestis sarmenta, which is found in China.
