= Lecithocera megalopis =

Scientific classification
- Domain: Eukaryota
- Kingdom: Animalia
- Phylum: Arthropoda
- Class: Insecta
- Order: Lepidoptera
- Family: Lecithoceridae
- Genus: Lecithocera
- Species: L. megalopis

Binomial name
- Lecithocera megalopis Meyrick, 1916

Species of moth in genus Lecithocera

Lecithocera megalopis is a moth in the family Lecithoceridae. It is found in Taiwan, China (Jiangxi) and the Philippines.

The wingspan is 16–17 mm. The forewings are pale ochreous-yellowish or whitish-ochreous, more or less sprinkled with fuscous. The discal stigmata are large and black, the second connected with the tornus by a rather dark fuscous shade. There is a marginal series of small dark fuscous dots around the apex and termen. The hindwings are light grey.
