= Rhyparomatrix =

Scientific classification
- Kingdom: Animalia
- Phylum: Arthropoda
- Clade: Pancrustacea
- Class: Insecta
- Order: Lepidoptera
- Family: Lecithoceridae
- Genus: Rhyparomatrix; Gozmány, 1972
- Species: R. rusticana

Binomial name
- Rhyparomatrix rusticana (Meyrick, 1918)

Synonyms
- Brachmia rusticana Meyrick, 1918

Genus of moths

Rhyparomatrix is a genus of moth in the family Lecithoceridae. It contains the species Rhyparomatrix rusticana, which is found in southern India.

The wingspan is about 19 mm. The forewings are bronzy-fuscous. The stigmata are cloudy and dark fuscous, the plical somewhat beyond the first discal. The hindwings are grey.
