= Phanoschista =

Scientific classification
- Kingdom: Animalia
- Phylum: Arthropoda
- Clade: Pancrustacea
- Class: Insecta
- Order: Lepidoptera
- Family: Lecithoceridae
- Genus: Phanoschista; Meyrick, 1925
- Species: P. meryntis

Binomial name
- Phanoschista meryntis (Meyrick, 1908)

Synonyms
- Tingentera meryntis Meyrick, 1908

Genus of moth

Phanoschista is a genus of moths in the family Lecithoceridae. It contains the species Phanoschista meryntis, which is found in southern India.

The wingspan is 17–19 mm. The forewings are bronzy-fuscous with bluish-leaden reflections and with the basal third irregularly streaked longitudinally with yellowish, with dark shining purplish-fuscous costal and purple-blackish subcostal streaks, and lines of blackish scales between the yellowish streaks. There is a slender oblique pale yellowish median fascia, yellower posteriorly and the posterior half of the wing is streaked with ochreous-yellowish on the veins, the interspaces shining leaden-metallic. The hindwings are grey, in males broadly suffused with whitish-ochreous-yellowish in the disc, with a submedian groove containing an expansible pencil of long pale yellowish hairs.
