= Onebala zulu =

Scientific classification
- Domain: Eukaryota
- Kingdom: Animalia
- Phylum: Arthropoda
- Class: Insecta
- Order: Lepidoptera
- Family: Gelechiidae
- Genus: Onebala
- Species: O. zulu

Binomial name
- Onebala zulu (Walsingham, 1881)

Synonyms
- Gelechia zulu Walsingham, 1881

Species of moth

Onebala zulu is a moth in the family Gelechiidae. It was described by Thomas de Grey, 6th Baron Walsingham, in 1881. It is found in Namibia, South Africa (KwaZulu-Natal, Gauteng), Gambia and Zimbabwe. The Global Lepidoptera Names Index has this name as a synonym of Onebala lamprostoma.

The wingspan is about 12 mm. The forewings are brownish fuscous, with a white fascia scarcely beyond the middle pointing obliquely outwards from the costa, and sometimes with an excrescence on its inner edge about the middle of the wing. A white triangular costal spot is found before the apex and the apical margin is marked by a slender whitish line, followed by some blackish scales at the base of the cilia. A pale streak runs along the dorsal margin, its upper half whitish, its lower half ferruginous. The hindwings are pale fuscous.
