= Cophomantella crypsizyga =

Scientific classification
- Domain: Eukaryota
- Kingdom: Animalia
- Phylum: Arthropoda
- Class: Insecta
- Order: Lepidoptera
- Family: Lecithoceridae
- Genus: Cophomantella
- Species: C. crypsizyga

Binomial name
- Cophomantella crypsizyga (Meyrick, 1914)

Synonyms
- Onebala crypsizyga Meyrick, 1914

Species of moth

Cophomantella crypsizyga is a moth in the family Lecithoceridae. It was described by Edward Meyrick in 1914. It is known from Malawi.

The wingspan is about 16 mm. The forewings are dark bluish-purple fuscous with obscure transverse blackish fasciae at two-fifths and from two-thirds of the costa to the dorsum before the tornus, only visible in certain lights, the latter followed on the costa by a triangular whitish-ochreous spot. The hindwings are grey, darker towards the termen.
