= Thamnopalpa =

Scientific classification
- Kingdom: Animalia
- Phylum: Arthropoda
- Clade: Pancrustacea
- Class: Insecta
- Order: Lepidoptera
- Family: Lecithoceridae
- Genus: Thamnopalpa; Gozmány in Amsel et al., 1978
- Species: T. argomitra

Binomial name
- Thamnopalpa argomitra (Meyrick, 1925)

Synonyms
- Lecithocera argomitra Meyrick, 1925

Genus of moths

Thamnopalpa is a monotypic genus of moth in the family Lecithoceridae. It contains the species Thamnopalpa argomitra, which is found in Indonesia (Sumatra).
