= Onebala probolaspis =

Scientific classification
- Kingdom: Animalia
- Phylum: Arthropoda
- Class: Insecta
- Order: Lepidoptera
- Family: Gelechiidae
- Genus: Onebala
- Species: O. probolaspis

Binomial name
- Onebala probolaspis Meyrick, 1929

Species of moth

Onebala probolaspis is a moth in the family Gelechiidae. It was described by Edward Meyrick in 1929. It is found in South Africa.

The wingspan is about 11 mm.
