= Mexytocerus =

Scientific classification
- Kingdom: Animalia
- Phylum: Arthropoda
- Class: Insecta
- Order: Lepidoptera
- Family: Lecithoceridae
- Genus: Mexytocerus; Viette, 1989
- Species: M. enigmaticus

Binomial name
- Mexytocerus enigmaticus Viette, 1989

Genus of moths

Mexytocerus is a genus of moth in the family Lecithoceridae. It contains the species Mexytocerus enigmaticus, which is found in Madagascar.
