= Onebala euargyra =

Scientific classification
- Domain: Eukaryota
- Kingdom: Animalia
- Phylum: Arthropoda
- Class: Insecta
- Order: Lepidoptera
- Family: Gelechiidae
- Genus: Onebala
- Species: O. euargyra

Binomial name
- Onebala euargyra (Turner, 1919)

Synonyms
- Helcystogramma euargyra Turner, 1919

Species of moth

Onebala euargyra is a moth in the family Gelechiidae. It was described by Alfred Jefferis Turner in 1919. It is found in Australia, where it has been recorded from Queensland.

The wingspan is 12 mm. The forewings are whitish, on the dorsal half suffused with fuscous and with a short fuscous strigula on the costa at one-third and another on the middle. There is an elongate-triangular fuscous spot on the costa at two-third, as well as a broad silvery transverse line from the termen beyond the tornus to near the costa before the apex and there are four longitudinal black streaks beyond this, as well as a black terminal line. The hindwings are grey, ochreous-whitish towards the base.
