= Lecithocera pelomorpha =

Scientific classification
- Domain: Eukaryota
- Kingdom: Animalia
- Phylum: Arthropoda
- Class: Insecta
- Order: Lepidoptera
- Family: Lecithoceridae
- Genus: Lecithocera
- Species: L. pelomorpha

Binomial name
- Lecithocera pelomorpha Meyrick, 1931

Species of moth in genus Lecithocera

Lecithocera pelomorpha is a moth in the family Lecithoceridae. It is found in Taiwan and the provinces of Sichuan, Yunnan, Hunan and Zhejiang in China.

The wingspan is 18–21 mm. The forewings are yellowish brown.
