= Urolaguna =

Scientific classification
- Kingdom: Animalia
- Phylum: Arthropoda
- Class: Insecta
- Order: Lepidoptera
- Family: Lecithoceridae
- Genus: Urolaguna; Wu, 1994
- Species: U. heosa

Binomial name
- Urolaguna heosa Wu, 1994

Genus of moths

Urolaguna is a genus of moth in the family Lecithoceridae. It contains the species Urolaguna heosa, which is found in China (Jiangxi).
