= Pompographa =

Scientific classification
- Kingdom: Animalia
- Phylum: Arthropoda
- Clade: Pancrustacea
- Class: Insecta
- Order: Lepidoptera
- Family: Lecithoceridae
- Genus: Pompographa; Gozmány, 1971
- Species: P. philosopha

Binomial name
- Pompographa philosopha (Meyrick, 1911)

Synonyms
- Brachmia philosopha Meyrick, 1911

Genus of moths

Pompographa is a genus of moth in the family Lecithoceridae. It contains the species Pompographa philosopha, which is native in India (Assam).

The wingspan reaches a length of about 13–15 mm. The forewings are rather dark fuscous with an irregularly triangular blotch of dark fuscous suffusion on the dorsum before the middle, reaching more than half across the wing. The costa is suffused with dark fuscous from one-third to the apex. A small whitish spot on the middle of the costa was found beneath, a patch of whitish irroration. There are two small blackish spots edged with a few whitish scales in the transverse side of the disc at three-fifths. An indistinct bi-sinuate whitish line is at four-fifths, sharply marked towards the costa. There is also a black terminal line. The hindwings are grey.
