= Longipenis =

Scientific classification
- Domain: Eukaryota
- Kingdom: Animalia
- Phylum: Arthropoda
- Class: Insecta
- Order: Lepidoptera
- Family: Lecithoceridae
- Genus: Longipenis; Wu, 1994

Type species
- Longipenis deltidius Wu, 1994

Genus of moths

Longipenis is a genus of moths in the family Lecithoceridae.

== Species ==
- Longipenis deltidius Wu, 1994
- Longipenis dentivalvus H. Wang and M. Wang, 2010
- Longipenis paradeltidius M. Wang and Xiong, 2010
