= Cynicocrates =

Scientific classification
- Kingdom: Animalia
- Phylum: Arthropoda
- Class: Insecta
- Order: Lepidoptera
- Family: Lecithoceridae
- Genus: Cynicocrates; Meyrick, 1935
- Species: C. tachytoma

Binomial name
- Cynicocrates tachytoma Meyrick, 1935

Genus of moths

Cynicocrates is a genus of moth in the family Lecithoceridae. It contains the species Cynicocrates tachytoma, which is found in Taiwan.
