= Scaeostrepta =

Scientific classification
- Kingdom: Animalia
- Phylum: Arthropoda
- Class: Insecta
- Order: Lepidoptera
- Family: Lecithoceridae
- Genus: Scaeostrepta; Meyrick, 1931
- Species: S. geranoptera

Binomial name
- Scaeostrepta geranoptera Meyrick, 1931

Genus of moths

Scaeostrepta is a genus of moth in the family Lecithoceridae. It contains the species Scaeostrepta geranoptera, which is found in New Guinea.
