= Placanthes =

Scientific classification
- Kingdom: Animalia
- Phylum: Arthropoda
- Class: Insecta
- Order: Lepidoptera
- Family: Lecithoceridae
- Genus: Placanthes; Meyrick, 1923
- Species: P. xanthomorpha

Binomial name
- Placanthes xanthomorpha Meyrick, 1923

Genus of moths

Placanthes is a genus of moth in the family Lecithoceridae. It contains the species Placanthes xanthomorpha, which is found in the Philippines (Mindoro).

The wingspan is about 24 mm. The forewings are blackish-fuscous with orange-yellow markings. There is an elongate-oblong spot above the dorsum from near the base to one-fourth and a small elongate spot beneath the costa at one-fifth, as well as a transverse blotch in the disc before the middle not reaching the margins. A large oval blotch extends in the disc from beyond the middle to five-sixths, with a small pointed posterior projection. The hindwings are dark bronzy-fuscous with orange-yellow markings. There is a rather thick subcostal streak from one-fourth to beyond the middle and an irregular trapezoidal blotch occupying the posterior half of the dorsum and extending to near the middle of the disc. An oval blotch extends in the disc from the middle to five-sixths, with a patch occupying the apical projection except the tip, including a row of scattered blackish scales, and extended as a pointed streak along the upper part of the termen.
