= Asmenistis =

Scientific classification
- Kingdom: Animalia
- Phylum: Arthropoda
- Class: Insecta
- Order: Lepidoptera
- Family: Lecithoceridae
- Genus: Asmenistis; Meyrick, 1925

Genus of moths

Asmenistis is a genus of moths in the family Lecithoceridae.

== Species ==
- Asmenistis semifracta Diakonoff, 1954
- Asmenistis stephanocoma Meyrick, 1938
