= Lecithocera aulias =

Scientific classification
- Kingdom: Animalia
- Phylum: Arthropoda
- Class: Insecta
- Order: Lepidoptera
- Family: Lecithoceridae
- Genus: Lecithocera
- Species: L. aulias

Binomial name
- Lecithocera aulias Meyrick, 1910

Species of moth in genus Lecithocera

Lecithocera aulias is a moth in the family Lecithoceridae. It is found in Assam, India.

The wingspan is 13–14 mm. The forewings are whitish-ochreous in males, thinly sprinkled with dark fuscous, the costal edge ochreous-yellow, in females, the forewings are ochreous-yellowish, more strongly sprinkled with fuscous and dark fuscous. The costa is suffused with dark fuscous towards the base. The discal stigmata are black, the second connected with the dorsum by a transverse variable patch of dark fuscous suffusion. The hindwings are light grey.
