= Hyptiastis =

Scientific classification
- Kingdom: Animalia
- Phylum: Arthropoda
- Class: Insecta
- Order: Lepidoptera
- Family: Lecithoceridae
- Genus: Hyptiastis; Meyrick, 1911

Genus of moths

Hyptiastis is a genus of moths in the family Lecithoceridae.

== Species ==
- Hyptiastis clematias Meyrick, 1911
- Hyptiastis microcritha Diakonoff, 1954
