= Plagiocrossa =

Scientific classification
- Kingdom: Animalia
- Phylum: Arthropoda
- Class: Insecta
- Order: Lepidoptera
- Family: Lecithoceridae
- Genus: Plagiocrossa; Janse, 1954
- Species: P. picrodora

Binomial name
- Plagiocrossa picrodora (Meyrick, 1913)

Synonyms
- Lecithocera picrodora Meyrick, 1913

Genus of moths

Plagiocrossa is a monotypic moth genus in the family Lecithoceridae, erected by Anthonie Johannes Theodorus Janse in 1954. Its only species, Plagiocrossa picrodora, was first described by Edward Meyrick in 1913. It is found in South Africa.

The wingspan of Plagiocrossa is about 11 mm with the forewings being dark purplish fuscous, with the costal edge whitish ochreous from before the middle and almost to the apex. There is a transverse whitish-ochreous bar in the disc at three-fifths. The hindwings are pale whitish ochreous, towards the termen and dorsum tinged with grey.
