= Onebala amethystina =

Scientific classification
- Kingdom: Animalia
- Phylum: Arthropoda
- Class: Insecta
- Order: Lepidoptera
- Family: Gelechiidae
- Genus: Onebala
- Species: O. amethystina

Binomial name
- Onebala amethystina (Meyrick, 1904)

Synonyms
- Dectobathra amethystina Meyrick, 1904

Species of moth

Onebala amethystina is a moth in the family Gelechiidae. It was described by Edward Meyrick in 1904. It is found in Australia, where it has been recorded from New South Wales and Queensland.

The wingspan is 8–10 mm (0.31–0.39 in). The forewings are dark bronzy fuscous with an oblique white mark from the dorsum at one-third, as well as a violet-silvery-metallic rather irregularly curved line from two-fifths of the costa to beyond the middle of the dorsum, white on the costa. There is an irregular-oval spot outlined with violet silvery metallic in the disc beyond the middle, connected with the costa by a white mark. A violet-silvery-metallic irregular line from five-sixths of the costa to the tornus. The terminal area beyond this is more or less suffused with whitish ochreous, especially towards the tornus, and marked with four dark fuscous dashes. The hindwings are dark fuscous, darker posteriorly and with a rather broad white fascia beyond the middle, sometimes interrupted, seldom obsolete.
