= Hypochasmia =

Scientific classification
- Kingdom: Animalia
- Phylum: Arthropoda
- Class: Insecta
- Order: Lepidoptera
- Family: Lecithoceridae
- Genus: Hypochasmia; Meyrick, 1929
- Species: H. cirrhocrena

Binomial name
- Hypochasmia cirrhocrena Meyrick, 1929

Synonyms
- Hypocecis Walsingham, 1904

Genus of moths

Hypochasmia is a monotypic genus of moth in the family Lecithoceridae. It contains the species Hypochasmia cirrhocrena, which is found in southern India.

The wingspan is 12–14 mm.
