= Lecithocera ianthodes =

Scientific classification
- Domain: Eukaryota
- Kingdom: Animalia
- Phylum: Arthropoda
- Class: Insecta
- Order: Lepidoptera
- Family: Lecithoceridae
- Genus: Lecithocera
- Species: L. ianthodes

Binomial name
- Lecithocera ianthodes Meyrick, 1931

Species of moth in the genus Lecithocera

Lecithocera ianthodes is a moth in the family Lecithoceridae. It was described by Edward Meyrick in 1931. It is found in the Indian states of Uttarakhand and Himachal Pradesh.
