= Issikiopteryx sphaeristis =

Scientific classification
- Kingdom: Animalia
- Phylum: Arthropoda
- Class: Insecta
- Order: Lepidoptera
- Family: Lecithoceridae
- Genus: Issikiopteryx
- Species: I. sphaeristis

Binomial name
- Issikiopteryx sphaeristis (Meyrick, 1908)

Synonyms
- Timyra sphaeristis Meyrick, 1908; Olbothrepta sphaeristis

Species of moth

Issikiopteryx sphaeristis is a moth in the family Lecithoceridae. It is found in southern India.

The wingspan is 16–17 mm. The forewings are ochreous-yellow with a dark fuscous basal median dot and a moderate oblique fuscous fascia from near the costa at one-fourth to the middle of the dorsum, as well as a round fuscous blotch resting on the dorsum before the tornus and reaching four-fifths across the wing. There is also a triangular patch of fuscous suffusion resting on the termen. The hindwings are pale whitish-yellowish, in males with the basal half mostly occupied by a patch of modified brownish scales, including a long expansible pencil of brown hairs from the base in a submedian groove.
