= Cophomantella homogramma =

Scientific classification
- Domain: Eukaryota
- Kingdom: Animalia
- Phylum: Arthropoda
- Class: Insecta
- Order: Lepidoptera
- Family: Lecithoceridae
- Genus: Cophomantella
- Species: C. homogramma

Binomial name
- Cophomantella homogramma (Meyrick, 1918)

Synonyms
- Onebala homogramma Meyrick, 1918

Species of moth

Cophomantella homogramma is a moth in the family Lecithoceridae. It was described by Edward Meyrick in 1918. It is known from South Africa.

The wingspan is about 13 mm. The forewings are dark purplish fuscous with a somewhat irregular straight transverse whitish-ochreous line at two-fifths, somewhat expanded on the costa. There is a small whitish-ochreous spot on the costa at four-fifths, where a fine somewhat curved line of scattered whitish-ochreous scales runs to the dorsum before the tornus. The hindwings are grey.
