= Opacoptera =

Scientific classification
- Kingdom: Animalia
- Phylum: Arthropoda
- Clade: Pancrustacea
- Class: Insecta
- Order: Lepidoptera
- Family: Lecithoceridae
- Subfamily: Lecithocerinae
- Genus: Opacoptera; Gozmány in Amsel et al., 1978

Synonyms
- Fulvitalia Wu, 1996

Genus of moths

Opacoptera is a genus of moth in the family Lecithoceridae.

== Species ==
- Opacoptera callirrhabda (Meyrick, 1936)
- Opacoptera condensata Yu & Wang, 2023
- Opacoptera ecbasta Wu, 1996
- Opacoptera flavicana Wu & Liu, 1992
- Opacoptera hybocentra Yu & Wang, 2023
- Opacoptera introflexa Yu & Wang, 2023
- Opacoptera kerastiodes Park in Park & Kim, 2021
- Opacoptera longissima Yu & Wang, 2023
