= Hannara (moth) =

Scientific classification
- Kingdom: Animalia
- Phylum: Arthropoda
- Class: Insecta
- Order: Lepidoptera
- Family: Lecithoceridae
- Genus: Hannara; Park in Park & Lee, 2013

Genus of moths

Hannara is a genus of moths in the family Lecithoceridae. The genus was erected by Kyu-Tek Park in 2013.

== Species ==
- Hannara buloloensis Park, 2013
- Hannara gentis Park, 2013
