= Lecithocera perpensa =

Scientific classification
- Kingdom: Animalia
- Phylum: Arthropoda
- Class: Insecta
- Order: Lepidoptera
- Family: Lecithoceridae
- Genus: Lecithocera
- Species: L. perpensa

Binomial name
- Lecithocera perpensa Meyrick, 1918

Species of moth in the genus Lecithocera

Lecithocera perpensa is a moth in the family Lecithoceridae. It was described by Edward Meyrick in 1918. It is found in Assam, India.

The wingspan is about 13 mm. The forewings are light greyish ochreous, irrorated (sprinkled) with fuscous. The first discal stigma is moderate and dark fuscous, while the second is represented by a dark fuscous transverse mark, connected by an indistinct fuscous streak with the dorsum beneath it. The hindwings are pale grey.
