= Isotypa =

Scientific classification
- Kingdom: Animalia
- Phylum: Arthropoda
- Class: Insecta
- Order: Lepidoptera
- Family: Lecithoceridae
- Genus: Isotypa; Janse, 1954
- Species: I. discopuncta

Binomial name
- Isotypa discopuncta Janse, 1954

Genus of moths

Isotypa is a monotypic moth genus in the family Lecithoceridae. It contains the species Isotypa discopuncta, which is found in South Africa. Both the genus and species were first described by Anthonie Johannes Theodorus Janse in 1954.
