= Lecithocera goniometra =

Scientific classification
- Kingdom: Animalia
- Phylum: Arthropoda
- Class: Insecta
- Order: Lepidoptera
- Family: Lecithoceridae
- Genus: Lecithocera
- Species: L. goniometra

Binomial name
- Lecithocera goniometra Meyrick, 1929

Species of moth in the genus Lecithocera

Lecithocera goniometra is a moth in the family Lecithoceridae. It was described by Edward Meyrick in 1929. It is found on Luzon in the Philippines.

The wingspan is about 15 mm.
