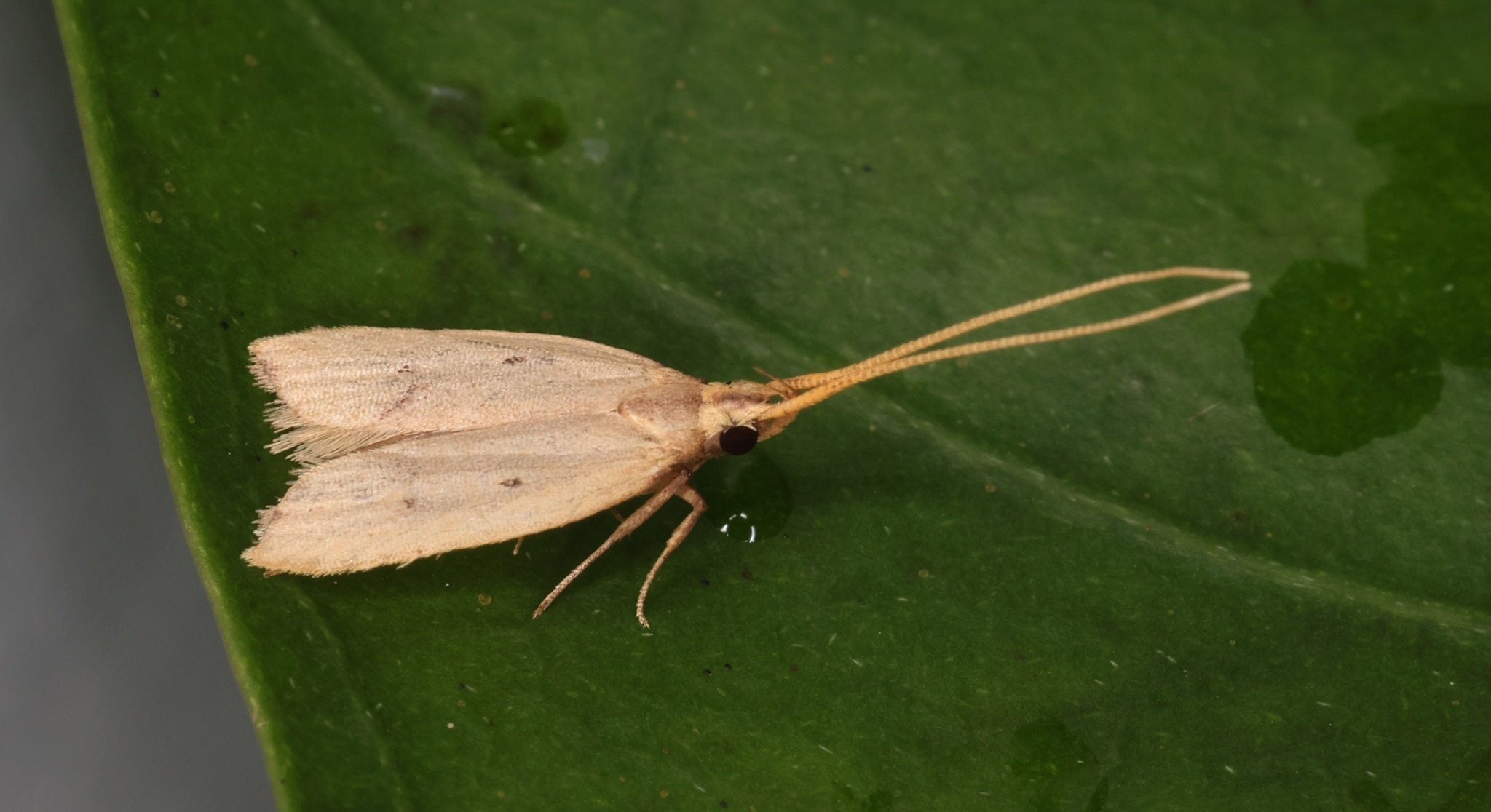

Scientific classification
- Kingdom: Animalia
- Phylum: Arthropoda
- Clade: Pancrustacea
- Class: Insecta
- Order: Lepidoptera
- Family: Lecithoceridae
- Genus: Lecithocera
- Species: L. metacausta

Binomial name
- Lecithocera metacausta Meyrick, 1910

Synonyms
- Lecithocera meyricki Gozmány, 1978 (preocc. Ghesquière, 1940); Lecithocera paraulias Gozmány, 1978

= Lecithocera metacausta =

Species of moth in genus Lecithocera

Lecithocera metacausta is a species of moth in the family Lecithoceridae. It is found in India (Assam, Himachal Pradesh), Taiwan and Korea.

== Description ==
The wingspan is 13–16 mm. The forewings are yellow-ochreous, suffusedly sprinkled with brown or dark fuscous and with the base of the costa more or less suffused with dark fuscous. The discal stigmata are dark fuscous, sometimes with a transverse mark of dark fuscous suffusion between the second discal and the dorsum. There is a dark fuscous patch along the termen from the apex, more or less narrowed downwards and not reaching the tornus. The hindwings are pale grey or in females sometimes grey.
