= Liu You-Qiao =

Liu Youqiao
- 劉友樵
- Education: Fu Jen Catholic University
- Known for: Research on Chinese moths and their taxonomy
- Scientific career
- Fields: Entomology, Lepidoptera
- Workplaces: Institute of Zoology, Chinese Academy of Sciences

Liu Youqiao (Chinese: 劉友樵; pinyin: Liú Yǒuqiáo) is a Chinese entomologist specializing in Lepidoptera, particularly moths. He was affiliated with the Institute of Zoology, Chinese Academy of Sciences in Beijing and served as an executive council member of the Entomological Society of China.

Liu has conducted extensive taxonomic research on Chinese moths. His publications include studies of Microlepidoptera and major contributions to the Fauna Sinica series. In 1992, he published a study describing two species of Microlepidoptera associated with Bombax and Cinnamomum.

In 2002, Liu co-authored volume 27 of Fauna Sinica, covering the moth family Tortricidae, together with Li Guangwu. In 2006, he co-authored volume 47, covering the family Lasiocampidae, with Wu Chunsheng.

Liu has maintained long-standing academic relationships and research collaborations with entomologists in Japan, South Korea and Europe. His Japanese colleagues and research contacts have included Hiroshi Kuroko, Toshiro Yasuda, Fumi Komai, Mamoru Owada, Itaru Kanazawa, Yoshitsugu Nasu, Yutaka Arita and Atsushi Kawabe. He has also participated in academic exchanges and collaborative research with South Korean lepidopterists, including Bae Yang-seop.
