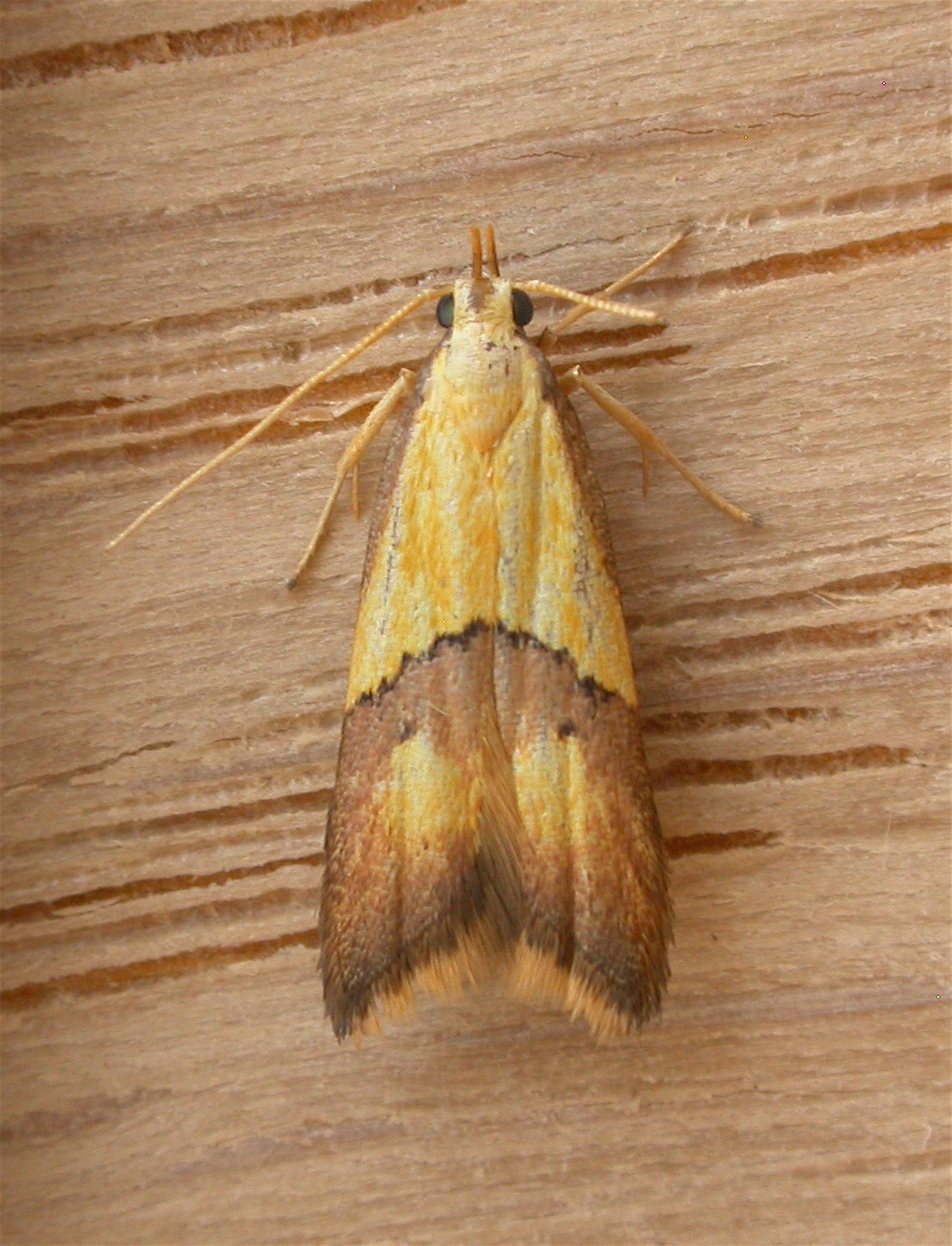
- Crocanthes glycina

Scientific classification
- Kingdom: Animalia
- Phylum: Arthropoda
- Class: Insecta
- Order: Lepidoptera
- Superfamily: Gelechioidea
- Family: Lecithoceridae; Le Marchand, 1947

Diversity
- Over 100 genera nearly 900 species

= Lecithoceridae =

Long-horned moths

Family of moths

The Lecithoceridae, or long-horned moths, are a family of small moths described by Simon Le Marchand in 1947. Although lecithocerids are found throughout the world, the great majority are found in the Indomalayan realm and the southern part of the Palaearctic realm.

== Systematics ==
The Lecithoceridae belong to the superfamily Gelechioidea, and comprises over 100 genera and nearly 900 species. The family is divided into these subfamilies:

- Lecithocerinae
- Torodorinae Gozmány in Amsel et al., 1978
- Ceuthomadarinae Gozmány, 1978

Park (2015) recently proposed another subfamily Crocanthinae, mainly based on Crocanthes Meyrick. The new subfamily include Crocanthes Meyrick, Aprosesta Turner, st. rev. (which is resurrected as a valid genus), Lamprista Park, Pacificulla Park, Hannara Park, and Gonaepa Walker.

== Unplaced to subfamily ==
- Crocanthes group
  - Crocanthes Meyrick, 1886
  - Cophomantella T. B. Fletcher, 1940
  - Hannara Park in Park & Lee, 2013
  - Pacificulla Park in Park & Lee, 2013
  - Lamprista Park & Lee, 2013
- Martyringa group
  - Martyringa Busck, 1902
- Other genera
  - Aproparia Gozmány, 1972
  - Asmenistis Meyrick, 1925
  - Cynicocrates Meyrick, 1935
  - Cynicostola Meyrick, 1925
  - Enthetica Meyrick, 1916
  - Epimactis Meyrick, 1907
  - Galoxestis Wu, 1994
  - Heteroderces Meyrick, 1929
  - Hypochasmia Meyrick, 1929
  - Hyptiastis Meyrick, 1911
  - Isotypa Janse, 1954
  - Longipenis Wu, 1994
  - Malachoherca Wu, 1994
  - Merocrates Meyrick, 1931
  - Mexytocerus Viette, 1989
  - Monerista Meyrick, 1925
  - Olbothrepta Meyrick, 1925
  - Opacoptera Gozmány in Amsel et al., 1978
  - Phanoschista Meyrick, 1925
  - Phatnotis Meyrick, 1913
  - Philarachnis Meyrick, 1925
  - Placanthes Meyrick, 1923
  - Plagiocrossa Janse, 1954
  - Pompographa Gozmány, 1971
  - Proesochtha Wu, 1994
  - Ptilothyris Walsingham, 1897
  - Rhyparomatrix Gozmány, 1972
  - Scaeostrepta Meyrick, 1931
  - Scythostola Meyrick, 1925
  - Sisyrodonta Meyrick, 1922
  - Sphaerolbia Meyrick, 1934
  - Stryphnocopa Meyrick, 1920
  - Thamnopalpa Gozmány in Amsel et al., 1978
  - Urolaguna Wu, 1994
