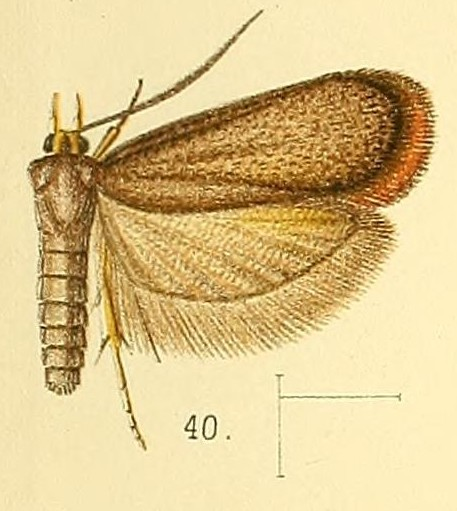

Scientific classification
- Domain: Eukaryota
- Kingdom: Animalia
- Phylum: Arthropoda
- Class: Insecta
- Order: Lepidoptera
- Family: Lecithoceridae
- Genus: Lecithocera
- Species: L. flavipalpis

Binomial name
- Lecithocera flavipalpis Walsingham, 1891

= Lecithocera flavipalpis =

Species of moth in genus Lecithocera

Lecithocera flavipalpis is a moth in the family Lecithoceridae. It was described by Thomas de Grey in 1891. It is found in Mozambique, South Africa and Zimbabwe.

The wingspan is about 18 mm. The forewings are deep bronze-colour, without markings. The hindwings are paler than the forewings, bronzy fuscous.
