= Lecithocera pseudolunata =

Scientific classification
- Kingdom: Animalia
- Phylum: Arthropoda
- Class: Insecta
- Order: Lepidoptera
- Family: Lecithoceridae
- Genus: Lecithocera
- Species: L. pseudolunata

Binomial name
- Lecithocera pseudolunata Park, 2012

Species of moth in genus Lecithocera

Lecithocera pseudolunata is a moth in the family Lecithoceridae first described by Kyu-Tek Park in 2012. It is found in Indonesia (Irian Jaya) and Papua New Guinea.

The wingspan is 11–12 millimetres (0.43–0.47 in). This species was described as part of a 2012 review of the genus Lecithocera in New Guinea by Kyu-Tek Park. In this review, L. pseudolunata was identified as one of three sibling species closely related to L. sublunata.

== Etymology ==
The species name refers to the resemblance to Lecithocera sublunata.
