= Lecithocera sublunata =

Scientific classification
- Domain: Eukaryota
- Kingdom: Animalia
- Phylum: Arthropoda
- Class: Insecta
- Order: Lepidoptera
- Family: Lecithoceridae
- Genus: Lecithocera
- Species: L. sublunata

Binomial name
- Lecithocera sublunata Diakonoff, 1954

Species of moth in genus Lecithocera

Lecithocera sublunata is a moth in the family Lecithoceridae. It is found in Papua (then called Irian Jaya) Indonesia.

The wingspan is about 12 mm.
