= Lecithocera chartaca =

Scientific classification
- Kingdom: Animalia
- Phylum: Arthropoda
- Clade: Pancrustacea
- Class: Insecta
- Order: Lepidoptera
- Family: Lecithoceridae
- Genus: Lecithocera
- Species: L. chartaca

Binomial name
- Lecithocera chartaca Wu & Liu, 1993

Species of moth in genus Lecithocera

Lecithocera chartaca is a moth in the family Lecithoceridae. It is found in Jiangxi province China and Taiwan.

The wingspan is 14–15 mm. The species resembles Lecithocera aspergata, but the forewings are lighter and there is an anal angular bar.
