= Lecithocera capnaula =

Scientific classification
- Kingdom: Animalia
- Phylum: Arthropoda
- Class: Insecta
- Order: Lepidoptera
- Family: Lecithoceridae
- Genus: Lecithocera
- Species: L. capnaula

Binomial name
- Lecithocera capnaula (Meyrick, 1911)

Synonyms
- Brachmia capnaula Meyrick, 1911

Species of moth in the genus Lecithocera

Lecithocera capnaula is a moth in the family Lecithoceridae. It was described by Edward Meyrick in 1911. It is found in Sri Lanka.

The wingspan is 20–22 mm. The forewings are brownish, variable in depth, the veins usually more or less marked with irregular streaks of coarse dark fuscous irroration (sprinkles). The stigmata are dark fuscous, the plical beneath the first discal, the second discal larger, transverse oval, but these are sometimes merged in more or less developed thick cloudy dark fuscous longitudinal streaks through the middle of the disc and along the fold. There is a pale cloudy subterminal line formed by an interruption of dark streaks on the veins, somewhat indented above the middle, the terminal area beyond this often suffused with dark fuscous. The hindwings are grey.
