= Lecithocera fornacalis =

Scientific classification
- Kingdom: Animalia
- Phylum: Arthropoda
- Class: Insecta
- Order: Lepidoptera
- Family: Lecithoceridae
- Genus: Lecithocera
- Species: L. fornacalis

Binomial name
- Lecithocera fornacalis (Meyrick, 1911)

Synonyms
- Brachmia fornacalis Meyrick, 1911

Species of moth in the genus Lecithocera

Lecithocera fornacalis is a moth in the family Lecithoceridae. It was described by Edward Meyrick in 1911. It is found in Sri Lanka.

The wingspan is 17–19 mm. The forewings are rather dark purplish fuscous, in males lighter in the disc. The stigmata are represented by blackish-fuscous spots, the first discal small and roundish, the plical beneath it, larger and irregular, these two edged with whitish ochreous posteriorly and sometimes confluent, the second discal represented by two small transversely placed spots, connected and upper edged laterally with whitish ochreous. In males, there is a distinct whitish-ochreous slightly curved transverse line at four-fifths, dilated on the costa, indented above the middle, in females represented by a costal spot only. The hindwings are fuscous.
