= Lecithocera exophthalma =

Scientific classification
- Kingdom: Animalia
- Phylum: Arthropoda
- Class: Insecta
- Order: Lepidoptera
- Family: Lecithoceridae
- Genus: Lecithocera
- Species: L. exophthalma

Binomial name
- Lecithocera exophthalma (Meyrick, 1911)

Synonyms
- Brachmia exophthalma Meyrick, 1911

Species of moth in the genus Lecithocera

Lecithocera exophthalma is a moth in the family Lecithoceridae. It was described by Edward Meyrick in 1911. It is found in southern India.

The wingspan is 17–21 mm. The forewings are purplish fuscous, rather darker in females and with an elongate black dot beneath the costa near the base. The plical and first discal stigmata are united into a transverse-oval blackish blotch, edged posteriorly with whitish ochreous, and the second discal represented by a quite similar blotch, edged on both sides. There is a black dot lying between the upper extremities of these and also an indistinct pale ochreous somewhat curved subterminal line, dilated and distinct on the costa, indented beneath the costa. The hindwings are light grey in males and grey in females.
