= Lecithocera homocentra =

Scientific classification
- Kingdom: Animalia
- Phylum: Arthropoda
- Class: Insecta
- Order: Lepidoptera
- Family: Lecithoceridae
- Genus: Lecithocera
- Species: L. homocentra

Binomial name
- Lecithocera homocentra Meyrick, 1910

Species of moth in the genus Lecithocera

Lecithocera homocentra is a moth in the family Lecithoceridae. It was described by Edward Meyrick in 1910. It is found in Sri Lanka.

The wingspan is 17–19 mm. The forewings are pale brownish ochreous, sometimes tinged with fuscous, especially towards the base of the dorsum, sometimes partially sprinkled with fuscous. The discal stigmata are rather large and blackish, the plical sometimes indicated by some dark fuscous scales beneath the first discal, but often absent. There is a cloudy transverse mark of dark fuscous scales beneath the second discal. There is a series of small dark fuscous dots around the posterior part of the costa and termen. The hindwings are whitish ochreous.
