= Lecithocera haemylopis =

Scientific classification
- Kingdom: Animalia
- Phylum: Arthropoda
- Class: Insecta
- Order: Lepidoptera
- Family: Lecithoceridae
- Genus: Lecithocera
- Species: L. haemylopis

Binomial name
- Lecithocera haemylopis (Meyrick, 1911)

Synonyms
- Brachmia haemylopis Meyrick, 1911

Species of moth in the genus Lecithocera

Lecithocera haemylopis is a moth in the family Lecithoceridae. It was described by Edward Meyrick in 1911. It is found in Sri Lanka.

The wingspan is 15–17 mm. The forewings are dark fuscous, slightly purplish tinged. The stigmata are black, the plical slightly beyond the first discal, both these edged posteriorly with a few white scales, the second discal mixed with white scales. There is an obscure pale whitish-ochreous dot on the costa at four-fifths, with traces of a very faint sinuate transverse line from it. The hindwings are grey.
