= Lecithocera epomia =

Scientific classification
- Kingdom: Animalia
- Phylum: Arthropoda
- Class: Insecta
- Order: Lepidoptera
- Family: Lecithoceridae
- Genus: Lecithocera
- Species: L. epomia

Binomial name
- Lecithocera epomia (Meyrick, 1905)

Synonyms
- Torodora epomia Meyrick, 1905

Species of moth in the genus Lecithocera

Lecithocera epomia is a moth in the family Lecithoceridae. It was described by Edward Meyrick in 1905. It is found in Sri Lanka.

The wingspan is about 23 mm. The forewings are bronzy ochreous, suffused with pale brownish except towards the anterior two-thirds of the costa. There is a spot of dark purple-fuscous suffusion on the base of the costa. The stigmata are dark fuscous, the discal small and indistinct, the plical and an additional dot beneath the second discal large, the plical directly beneath the first discal. The hindwings are grey, lighter towards the base.
