= Lecithocera carpaea =

Scientific classification
- Kingdom: Animalia
- Phylum: Arthropoda
- Class: Insecta
- Order: Lepidoptera
- Family: Lecithoceridae
- Genus: Lecithocera
- Species: L. carpaea

Binomial name
- Lecithocera carpaea (Meyrick, 1906)

Synonyms
- Psammoris carpaea Meyrick, 1906

Species of moth in the genus Lecithocera

Lecithocera carpaea is a moth in the family Lecithoceridae. It was described by Edward Meyrick in 1906. It is found in Sri Lanka.

The wingspan is 13–14 mm. The forewings are ochreous yellow, with some fine scattered black scales and with a very small blackish spot on the base of the costa, as well as a rather curved outwardly oblique thick black mark in the disc about two-fifths, as well as a small round black discal spot before three-fourths. The hindwings are light grey, paler and whitish tinged towards the base.
