= Lecithocera pyxinodes =

Scientific classification
- Kingdom: Animalia
- Phylum: Arthropoda
- Class: Insecta
- Order: Lepidoptera
- Family: Lecithoceridae
- Genus: Lecithocera
- Species: L. pyxinodes

Binomial name
- Lecithocera pyxinodes Meyrick, 1918

Species of moth in the genus Lecithocera

Lecithocera pyxinodes is a moth in the family Lecithoceridae. It was described by Edward Meyrick in 1918. It is found on Madagascar.

The wingspan is about 15 mm. The forewings are brownish ochreous sprinkled with fuscous. The stigmata are moderate, cloudy and rather dark fuscous, the plical beneath the first discal, the second lying in an undefined fascia of fuscous suffusion crossing the wing. The hindwings are pale brassy ochreous.
