= Lecithocera caecilia =

Scientific classification
- Kingdom: Animalia
- Phylum: Arthropoda
- Class: Insecta
- Order: Lepidoptera
- Family: Lecithoceridae
- Genus: Lecithocera
- Species: L. caecilia

Binomial name
- Lecithocera caecilia Meyrick, 1918

Species of moth in the genus Lecithocera

Lecithocera caecilia is a moth in the family Lecithoceridae. It was described by Edward Meyrick in 1918. It is found in Sri Lanka.

The wingspan is about 15 mm. The forewings are ochreous with the base of the costa dark fuscous. The discal stigmata are blackish, the second almost connected to the dorsum by a narrow irregular transverse streak of dark fuscous suffusion. There are dark fuscous marginal dots around the apex and termen. The hindwings are light grey.
