= Lecithocera itrinea =

Scientific classification
- Kingdom: Animalia
- Phylum: Arthropoda
- Class: Insecta
- Order: Lepidoptera
- Family: Lecithoceridae
- Genus: Lecithocera
- Species: L. itrinea

Binomial name
- Lecithocera itrinea Meyrick, 1910

Species of moth in the genus Lecithocera

Lecithocera itrinea is a moth in the family Lecithoceridae. It was described by Edward Meyrick in 1910. It is found in Sri Lanka and southern India.

The wingspan is 12–13 mm. The forewings are brownish, irrorated (sprinkled) with dark fuscous. The stigmata are very cloudy and dark fuscous, the plical hardly marked, the second discal sometimes forming a transverse mark. The hindwings are light fuscous.
