= Lecithocera sinuosa =

Scientific classification
- Kingdom: Animalia
- Phylum: Arthropoda
- Class: Insecta
- Order: Lepidoptera
- Family: Lecithoceridae
- Genus: Lecithocera
- Species: L. sinuosa

Binomial name
- Lecithocera sinuosa Meyrick, 1910

Species of moth in the genus Lecithocera

Lecithocera sinuosa is a moth in the family Lecithoceridae. It was described by Edward Meyrick in 1910. It is found in Sri Lanka.

The wingspan is 9–10 mm (0.35–0.39 in). The forewings are light glossy grey with a slight purplish tinge and with a narrow rather inwards-curved pale ochreous-yellowish fascia from three-fourths of the costa to the tornus. The hindwings are light grey.
