= Lecithocera alternella =

Scientific classification
- Kingdom: Animalia
- Phylum: Arthropoda
- Class: Insecta
- Order: Lepidoptera
- Family: Lecithoceridae
- Genus: Lecithocera
- Species: L. alternella

Binomial name
- Lecithocera alternella (Walker, 1866)

Synonyms
- Andusia alternella Walker, 1866

Species of moth in genus Lecithocera

Lecithocera alternella is a moth in the family Lecithoceridae. It was described by Francis Walker in 1866. It is found in Java, Indonesia.

Adults are ferruginous brown, the wings with an ochraceous fringe. The forewings have two basal ochraceous streaks and the hindwings have two abbreviated ochraceous stripes, one subcostal and bifurcate, the other trifurcate.
