= Lecithocera myopa =

Scientific classification
- Kingdom: Animalia
- Phylum: Arthropoda
- Class: Insecta
- Order: Lepidoptera
- Family: Lecithoceridae
- Genus: Lecithocera
- Species: L. myopa

Binomial name
- Lecithocera myopa Meyrick, 1913

Species of moth in the genus Lecithocera

Lecithocera myopa is a moth in the family Lecithoceridae. It was described by Edward Meyrick in 1913. It is found in South Africa.

The wingspan is 11–12 mm. The forewings are purplish grey, irrorated (sprinkled) with dark fuscous and blackish. There is a small whitish-ochreous spot at the base in the middle. The discal stigmata are cloudy and dark fuscous. The hindwings are rather dark grey.
