= Lecithocera lucernata =

Scientific classification
- Kingdom: Animalia
- Phylum: Arthropoda
- Class: Insecta
- Order: Lepidoptera
- Family: Lecithoceridae
- Genus: Lecithocera
- Species: L. lucernata

Binomial name
- Lecithocera lucernata Meyrick, 1913

Species of moth in the genus Lecithocera

Lecithocera lucernata is a moth in the family Lecithoceridae. It was described by Edward Meyrick in 1913. It is found in Katanga in the Democratic Republic of the Congo and Gauteng in South Africa.

The wingspan is about 18 mm. The forewings are bronzy fuscous irrorated (sprinkled) with dark purplish fuscous. There is a white discal dot before two-thirds. The hindwings are grey.
