= Lecithocera cornutella =

Scientific classification
- Kingdom: Animalia
- Phylum: Arthropoda
- Class: Insecta
- Order: Lepidoptera
- Family: Lecithoceridae
- Genus: Lecithocera
- Species: L. cornutella

Binomial name
- Lecithocera cornutella (Walker, 1864)

Synonyms
- Gelechia cornutella Walker, 1864

Species of moth in genus Lecithocera

Lecithocera cornutella is a moth in the family Lecithoceridae. It was described by Francis Walker in 1864. It is found in Sri Lanka.

Adults are cinereous-fawn colour, with the wings long, narrow and shining. The forewings are somewhat rounded at the tips, with the exterior border extremely oblique. The hindwings are whitish cinereous.
