= Lecithocera omphacias =

Scientific classification
- Kingdom: Animalia
- Phylum: Arthropoda
- Class: Insecta
- Order: Lepidoptera
- Family: Lecithoceridae
- Genus: Lecithocera
- Species: L. omphacias

Binomial name
- Lecithocera omphacias Meyrick, 1910

Species of moth in the genus Lecithocera

Lecithocera omphacias is a moth in the family Lecithoceridae. It was described by Edward Meyrick in 1910. It is found in Sri Lanka.

The wingspan is about 12 mm. The forewings are grey, irrorated (sprinkled) with dark fuscous. The second discal stigma is represented by a cloudy dark fuscous transverse mark. The hindwings are grey.
