= Lecithocera glabrata =

Scientific classification
- Domain: Eukaryota
- Kingdom: Animalia
- Phylum: Arthropoda
- Class: Insecta
- Order: Lepidoptera
- Family: Lecithoceridae
- Genus: Lecithocera
- Species: L. glabrata

Binomial name
- Lecithocera glabrata (Wu and Liu, 1992)

Synonyms
- Quassitagma glabrata Wu and Liu, 1992

Species of moth in genus Lecithocera

Lecithocera glabrata is a species of moth of the family Lecithoceridae. It is found in Jiangxi, Fujian, Hunan, Yunnan and Guizhou provinces of China and in Taiwan.

The wingspan is 12–13 mm.
