= Lecithocera crypsigenes =

Scientific classification
- Kingdom: Animalia
- Phylum: Arthropoda
- Class: Insecta
- Order: Lepidoptera
- Family: Lecithoceridae
- Genus: Lecithocera
- Species: L. crypsigenes

Binomial name
- Lecithocera crypsigenes Meyrick, 1929

Species of moth in the genus Lecithocera

Lecithocera crypsigenes is a moth in the family Lecithoceridae. It was described by Edward Meyrick in 1929. It is found in Sri Lanka.

The wingspan is about 14 mm. The forewings are fuscous speckled darker. The discal stigmata are small, obscure and dark fuscous. The hindwings are grey.
