= Lecithocera bimaculata =

Scientific classification
- Kingdom: Animalia
- Phylum: Arthropoda
- Class: Insecta
- Order: Lepidoptera
- Family: Lecithoceridae
- Genus: Lecithocera
- Species: L. bimaculata

Binomial name
- Lecithocera bimaculata Park, 1999

Species of moth in genus Lecithocera

Lecithocera bimaculata is a moth in the family Lecithoceridae first described by Kyu-Tek Park in 1999. It is found in Taiwan.

The wingspan is 20–21 mm.

== Etymology ==
The species name is derived from the Latin bi (meaning two) and maculata (meaning spot) and refers to the two distinct discal spots.
