= Lecithocera combusta =

Scientific classification
- Kingdom: Animalia
- Phylum: Arthropoda
- Class: Insecta
- Order: Lepidoptera
- Family: Lecithoceridae
- Genus: Lecithocera
- Species: L. combusta

Binomial name
- Lecithocera combusta Meyrick, 1918

Species of moth in the genus Lecithocera

Lecithocera combusta is a moth in the family Lecithoceridae. It was described by Edward Meyrick in 1918. It is found in Sri Lanka.

The wingspan is about 19 mm. The forewings are violet fuscous, tinged with ochreous in the disc. The discal stigmata are obscurely darker, the second transverse. The hindwings are light grey.
