= Lecithocera autologa =

Scientific classification
- Kingdom: Animalia
- Phylum: Arthropoda
- Class: Insecta
- Order: Lepidoptera
- Family: Lecithoceridae
- Genus: Lecithocera
- Species: L. autologa

Binomial name
- Lecithocera autologa Meyrick, 1910

Species of moth in the genus Lecithocera

Lecithocera autologa is a moth in the family Lecithoceridae. It was described by Edward Meyrick in 1910. It is found in Sri Lanka.

The wingspan is about 14 mm. The forewings are fuscous, irrorated (sprinkled) with dark fuscous. The discal stigmata are dark fuscous. The hindwings are grey.
