= Lecithocera indigens =

Scientific classification
- Kingdom: Animalia
- Phylum: Arthropoda
- Class: Insecta
- Order: Lepidoptera
- Family: Lecithoceridae
- Genus: Lecithocera
- Species: L. indigens

Binomial name
- Lecithocera indigens (Meyrick, 1914)

Synonyms
- Frisilia indigens Meyrick, 1914; Quassitagma indigens Gozmány, 1978

Species of moth in genus Lecithocera

Lecithocera indigens is a species of moth of the family Lecithoceridae. It is found in Yunnan in China and in Taiwan.

The wingspan is 14–16 millimetres (0.55–0.63 in).
