= Lecithocera acrosphales =

Scientific classification
- Kingdom: Animalia
- Phylum: Arthropoda
- Class: Insecta
- Order: Lepidoptera
- Family: Lecithoceridae
- Genus: Lecithocera
- Species: L. acrosphales

Binomial name
- Lecithocera acrosphales Meyrick, 1918

Species of moth in the genus Lecithocera

Lecithocera acrosphales is a moth in the family Lecithoceridae. It was described by Edward Meyrick in 1918. It is found on Madagascar.

The wingspan is about 15 mm. The forewings are violet fuscous sprinkled darker and the hindwings are grey.
