= Lecithocera rotundata =

Scientific classification
- Kingdom: Animalia
- Phylum: Arthropoda
- Clade: Pancrustacea
- Class: Insecta
- Order: Lepidoptera
- Family: Lecithoceridae
- Genus: Lecithocera
- Species: L. rotundata

Binomial name
- Lecithocera rotundata Gozmány, 1978

Species of moth in genus Lecithocera

Lecithocera rotundata is a moth in the family Lecithoceridae. It is found in Taiwan and Zhejiang and Jiangxi provinces of China.

The wingspan is 13 mm.
