= Lecithocera phratriastis =

Scientific classification
- Kingdom: Animalia
- Phylum: Arthropoda
- Class: Insecta
- Order: Lepidoptera
- Family: Lecithoceridae
- Genus: Lecithocera
- Species: L. phratriastis

Binomial name
- Lecithocera phratriastis Meyrick, 1929

Species of moth in the genus Lecithocera

Lecithocera phratriastis is a moth in the family Lecithoceridae. It was described by Edward Meyrick in 1929. It is found in Sri Lanka.

The wingspan is about 13 mm.
