= Lecithocera hildebrandtella =

Scientific classification
- Kingdom: Animalia
- Phylum: Arthropoda
- Clade: Pancrustacea
- Class: Insecta
- Order: Lepidoptera
- Family: Lecithoceridae
- Genus: Lecithocera
- Species: L. hildebrandtella

Binomial name
- Lecithocera hildebrandtella Viette, 1956

Species of moth in genus Lecithocera

Lecithocera hildebrandtella is a moth in the family Lecithoceridae. It was described by Viette in 1956. It is found in Madagascar.
