= Lecithocera paralevirota =

Scientific classification
- Kingdom: Animalia
- Phylum: Arthropoda
- Class: Insecta
- Order: Lepidoptera
- Family: Lecithoceridae
- Genus: Lecithocera
- Species: L. paralevirota

Binomial name
- Lecithocera paralevirota Park, 1999

Species of moth in genus Lecithocera

Lecithocera paralevirota is a moth in the family Lecithoceridae first described by Kyu-Tek Park in 1999. It is found in Taiwan.

The wingspan is 18–19 mm.
