= Lecithocera serena =

Scientific classification
- Kingdom: Animalia
- Phylum: Arthropoda
- Clade: Pancrustacea
- Class: Insecta
- Order: Lepidoptera
- Family: Lecithoceridae
- Genus: Lecithocera
- Species: L. serena

Binomial name
- Lecithocera serena (Gozmány, 1978)

Synonyms
- Sarisophora serena Gozmány, 1978

Species of moth in genus Lecithocera

Lecithocera serena is a moth in the family Lecithoceridae. It is found in Taiwan.
