= Lecithocera fascinatrix =

Scientific classification
- Kingdom: Animalia
- Phylum: Arthropoda
- Class: Insecta
- Order: Lepidoptera
- Family: Lecithoceridae
- Genus: Lecithocera
- Species: L. fascinatrix

Binomial name
- Lecithocera fascinatrix Meyrick, 1935

Species of moth in genus Lecithocera

Lecithocera fascinatrix is a moth belonging to the Lecithoceridae family. It is found in Taiwan.
