= Lecithocera perrierella =

Scientific classification
- Kingdom: Animalia
- Phylum: Arthropoda
- Class: Insecta
- Order: Lepidoptera
- Family: Lecithoceridae
- Genus: Lecithocera
- Species: L. perrierella

Binomial name
- Lecithocera perrierella Viette, 1985

Species of moth in genus Lecithocera

Lecithocera perrierella is a moth in the family Lecithoceridae. It was described by Viette in 1985. It is found in Africa.
