= List of moths of Taiwan =

Location of Taiwan

Taiwanese moths represent about 4,000 known moth species. The moths (mostly nocturnal) and butterflies (mostly diurnal) together make up the taxonomic order Lepidoptera.

This is a list of moth species that have been recorded in Taiwan.

== Acrolepiidae ==
- Acrolepiopsis brevipennella Moriuti, 1972
- Digitivalva longipennella Moriuti, 1972

== Adelidae ==
- Nematopogon taiwanella KozLev, 2001
- Nemophora aritai KozLev & Hirowatari, 1997
- Nemophora askoldella (Milliere, 1879)
- Nemophora decisella Walker, 1863
- Nemophora issikii KozLev & Hirowatari, 1997
- Nemophora lapikella KozLev, 1997b
- Nemophora limenites (Meyrick, 1914)
- Nemophora magnifica KozLev, 1997a
- Nemophora polychorda (Meyrick, 1914)
- Nemophora uncella KozLev, 1996

== Agonoxenidae ==
- Zaratha prosarista Meyrick, 1909

== Alucitidae ==
- Alucita spilodesma (Meyrick, 1908)

== Amphisbatidae ==
- Anchinia porphyritica Meyrick
- Cryptolechia argometra Meyrick, 1935
- Cryptolechia coriata Meyrick, 1914
- Cryptolechia epistemon Strand, 1920
- Cryptolechia fenerata Meyrick, 1914
- Cryptolechia malacobyrsa Meyrick, 1921
- Cryptolechia metacentra Meyrick, 1914
- Cryptolechia mitis Meyrick, 1914
- Cryptolechia pelophaea Meyrick, 1931
- Eutorna insidiosa Meyrick
- Machimia guerneella de Joannis, 1914

== Amphitheridae ==
- Agriothera elaeocarpophaga Moriuti, 1978
- Agriothera issikii Moriuti, 1978
- Telethera blepharacma Meyrick, 1913
- Telethera formosa Moriuti, 1978

== Arctiidae ==
- Aglaomorpha histrio (Miyake, 1907)
- Agrgina astrea (Drury, 1773)
- Agylla asakurana (Matsumura, 1931)
- Agylla pulchristriata Kishida
- Agylla virago Rothschild
- Agylla virilis Rothschild
- Amata edwardsii (Butler, 1876)
- Amata flava (Wileman, 1910)
- Amata formosensis (Wileman, 1928)
- Amata fortunei (Sonan, 1941)
- Amata hirayamae Matsumura
- Amata issikii (Sonan, 1941)
- Amata lucerna (Wileman, 1910)
- Amata nigrifrons Wileman
- Amata perixanthia (Hampson, 1898)
- Amata rantaisana (Sonan, 1941)
- Amata shirakii (Sonan, 1941)
- Amata t-nigra (Matsumura, 1931)
- Amata wilemani Rothschild, 1911
- Amerila astrea (Drury, 1773)
- Amsacta lactinea (Cramer, 1777)
- Amsactoides solitaria (Wileman, 1910)
- Areas galactina Okano, 1960
- Argina argus (Kollar, 1847)
- Argyarctia fuscobasalis (Matsumura, 1930)
- Argyarctia reikoae (Kishida, 1984)
- Asura acteota Swinhoe
- Asura albidorsalis Wileman
- Asura alikangiae Strand
- Asura arcuata (Moore, 1882)
- Asura connexa (Wileman, 1910)
- Asura striata Wileman
- Asura strigipennis (Herrich-Schäffer, 1914)
- Asura tricolor (Wileman, 1910)
- Asura uniformeola Hampson
- Asuridia rubripennis Inoue
- Asurpopsis ranruna Matsumura
- Brunia antica (Walker, 1854)
- Caeneressa alikangiensis (Strand, 1915)
- Caeneressa diaphana (Kollar, 1844)
- Calpenia takamukui Matsumura
- Chamaita hirta Wileman
- Chamaita ranruna (Matsumura, 1927)
- Chrysaeglia magnifica (Walker, 1862)
- Chrysaeglia taiwana (Hampson, 1914)
- Chrysorabdia taiwana Wileman
- Chrysorabdia vilemani Hampson, 1911
- Conilepia nigricosta Kishida, 1991
- Creatonotos gangis (Linnaeus, 1763)
- Creatonotos transiens (Walker, 1855)
- Creatonotos vacillans Walker
- Cyana effracta (Walker, 1854)
- Cyana formosana (Hampson, 1909)
- Cyana hamata (Walker, 1854)
- Cyana posilla (Wileman, 1910)
- Cyana propinqua (Wileman, 1910)
- Cyana quadripartita (Wileman, 1910)
- Cyana sanguinea (Bremer & Grey, 1852)
- Cyana straminea (Hampson, 1914)
- Cyana subalba (Wileman, 1910)
- Diduga flavicostata (Snellen, 1878)
- Eilema acutapex Strand
- Eilema arizana Wileman
- Eilema bicoloriceps Strand
- Eilema costipuncta (Leech, 1890)
- Eilema formosicola (Matsumura, 1927)
- Eilema griseola (Hübner, 1803)
- Eilema karenkona (Matsumura, 1927)
- Eilema magnata (Matsumura, 1927)
- Eilema obliquistria (Hampson, 1894)
- Eilema pulverea Wileman
- Eilema ranrunensis (Matsumura, 1927)
- Eilema ratonella (Matsumura, 1927)
- Eilema ratonis (Matsumura, 1927)
- Eilema rubrescens (Hampson, 1909)
- Eilema saitonis (Matsumura, 1927)
- Eilema sakia (Matsumura, 1927)
- Eilema serva (Walker, 1854)
- Eilema subcosteol (Druce, 1899)
- Eilema taiwana Wileman
- Eilema taiwanella (Matsumura, 1927)
- Eilema tecta Wileman
- Eilema tomponis (Matsumura, 1927)
- Eilema tricolor Wileman
- Eilema usuguronis (Matsumura, 1927)
- Eilema vensosa (Moore, 1878)
- Eospilarctia formosana (Rothschild, 1933)
- Eospilarctia nehallenia (Matsumura)
- Eospilarctia neurographa (Hampson, 1909)
- Eressa confinis (Wileman, 1910)
- Euchromia elegantissima Butler
- Eugoa bipunctata (Walker, 1862)
- Eugoa brunnea Hampson, 1914
- Eugoa formosibia Strand
- Eugoa grisea Butler, 1877
- Eugoa obscura Hampson
- Eugoa sinuata Wileman
- Garudinia simulana (Walker, 1863)
- Ghoria bani Kishida, 2006
- Ghoria subpurpurea (Matsumura, 1927)
- Gymnasura semilutea (Wileman, 1911)
- Heliosia alba Hampson
- Hemipsilia coavestis (Hampson, 1894)
- Hesudra divisa Moore, 1878
- Hyposiccia punctigera (Leech, 1899)
- Lemyra stigmata (Moore, 1865)
- Lemyra alikangensis (Strand, 1915)
- Lemyra fallaciosa (Matsumura, 1930)
- Lemyra imparilis (Butler, 1877)
- Lemyra infernalis (Butler, 1877)
- Lemyra moltrechti (Miyake, 1909)
- Lemyra nigricosta Thomas
- Lemyra rhodophilodes (Hampson, 1909)
- Lemyra wernerthomasi Inoue, 1993
- Macaduma cretacea Hampson
- Macrobrochis gigas (Walker, 1854)
- Meteugoa japonica Strand
- Meteugoa ochrivena (Hampson, 1898)
- Miltochrista convexa Wileman
- Miltochrista delineata (Walker, 1854)
- Miltochrista dentata Wileman
- Miltochrista fuscozonata Inoue
- Miltochrista karenkonis Matsumura
- Miltochrista koshunica Strand
- Miltochrista sauteri Strand
- Miltochrista takamukui Matsumura
- Miltochrista ziczac (Walker, 1856)
- Mithuna arizana Wileman
- Nannoarctia integra (Walker, 1855)
- Neasura gyochiana Matsumura
- Neasura melanopyga (Hampson, 1918)
- Neasura nigroanalis Matsumura
- Neasuroides asakurai Matsumura
- Neasuroides simplicior Matsumura
- Neoblavia scoteola Hampson
- Nikaea longipennis (Walker, 1855)
- Nikaea matsumurai Kishida
- Nikaeoides arisana (Matsumura, 1911)
- Nishada formosibia Matsumura
- Notata parva Hampson
- Nudaria suffusa Hampson
- Nudina artaxidia (Bulter, 1881)
- Nyctemera adversata (Schaller, 1788)
- Nyctemera albofasciata (Wileman, 1911)
- Nyctemera arctata Walker 1856
- Nyctemera baulus (Boisduval, 1832)
- Nyctemera cenis (Cramer, 1777)
- Nyctemera coleta (Stoll, 1781)
- Nyctemera formosana (Swinhoe, 1908)
- Nyctemera kotoshonis Matsumura
- Nyctemera lacticinia (Cramer, 1777)
- Oeonistis entella (Cramer, 1779)
- Palaeopsis diaphanella Hampson, 1893
- Palaeopsis squamifera Hampson
- Paraona staudingeri Okano, 1960
- Parasiccia dentata (Wileman, 1911)
- Parasiccia fuscipennis Wileman
- Parasiccia maculata (Poujade, 1886)
- Parasiccia nebulosa Wileman
- Parasiccia punctilinea Wileman
- Paraspilarctia magna (Wileman, 1910)
- Pelosia muscerda Hampson, 1900
- Philenora latifasciata Inoue & Kobayashi
- Pitasila brylancik (Bryk, 1937)
- Pitasila fractifascia (Wileman, 1911)
- Schistophleps bipuncta Hampson
- Siccia fumeola Hampson
- Siccia sordida (Bulter, 1877)
- Siccia taiwana Wileman
- Spilarctia alba (Matsumura, 1927)
- Spilarctia clava (Wileman, 1910)
- Spilarctia contaminata (Wileman, 1910)
- Spilarctia fumida (Wileman, 1910)
- Spilarctia nigrovittatus (Matsumura, 1911)
- Spilarctia postrubida (Wileman, 1910)
- Spilarctia rubida (Leech, 1890)
- Spilarctia subcarnea (Walker, 1855)
- Spilarctia subtestacea (Rothschild, 1910)
- Spilarctia taiwanensis (Matsumura, 1927)
- Spilarctia tienmushanica Kishida, 1991
- Spilarctia wilemani (Rothschild, 1914)
- Spilosoma daitoensis (Matsumura, 1930)
- Stigmatophora flava (Bremer, 1852)
- Stigmatophora palmata (Moore, 1878)
- Stigmatophora tridens (Wileman, 1910)
- Syntomoides imaon (Cramer, 1780)
- Taicallimorpha albipuncta (Wileman, 1910)
- Teulisna tumida (Walker, 1862)
- Thysanoptyx incurvata (Wileman & West, 1928)
- Tigrioides dimidiatus Matsumura
- Tigrioides immaculatus (Butler, 1880)
- Utetheisa lotrix (Cramer, 1777)
- Utetheisa pulchelloides Hampson
- Utetheisa vaga Jordan, 1939

== Arrhenophanidae ==
- Palaeophanes lativalva Davis, 2003
- Palaeophanes taiwanensis Davis, 2003

== Bedelliidae ==
- Bedellia ipomoella Kuroko, 1982

== Batrachedridae ==
- Batrachedra arenosella (Walker, 1864)
- Batrachedra pastor Meyrick, 1932

== Blastobasidae ==
- Blastobasis indirecta Meyrick, 1931
- Blastobasis nephelophaea Meyrick, 1931
- Blastobasis spermologa Meyrick, 1916
- Coniogenes contempta Meyrick, 1936
- Neoblastobasis decolor (Meyrick, 1907)

== Bombycidae ==
- Andraca olivacea Matsumura, 1927
- Andraca theae (Matsumura, 1909)
- Bombyx horsfieldi (Moore, 1860)
- Bombyx mandarina (Matsumura, 1927)
- Bombyx mori (Linnaeus, 1758)
- Bombyx rotundapex Miyata & Kishida, 1990
- Ernolatia moorei (Hutton, 1865)
- Mustilia fusca Kishida, 1993
- Mustilia sphingiformis gerontica West, 1932
- Oberthueria formosibia Matsumura, 1927
- Prismosticta fenestrata Butler, 1880
- Trilocha varians (Walker, 1855)
- Triuncina brunnea (Wileman, 1911)

== Brachodidae ==
- Miscera sauteri Kallies, 2004
- Nigilgia limata Diakonoff & Arita, 1979
- Paranigilgia bushii (Arita, 1980)

== Brahmaeidae ==
- Brahmaea wallichii Inoue, 1984

== Bucculatricidae ==
- Bucculatrix eremospora Meyrick, 1935
- Bucculatrix hypocypha Meyrick, 1936

== Callidulidae ==
- Callidula attenuata (Moore, 1879)
- Pterodecta felderi (Bremer, 1864)
- Tetragonus catamitus Geyer, 1832

== Carposinidae ==
- Heterogymna ochrogramma Meyrick, 1913
- Meridarchis concinna Meyrick, 1913
- Meridarchis jumboa Kawabe, 1980
- Metacosmesis aelinopa Diakonoff, 1982

== Choreutidae ==
- Anthophila halimora (Meyrick, 1912)
- Brenthia moriutii Arita, 1987
- Brenthia yaeyamae Arita, 1971
- Brenthia formosensis Issiki, 1930
- Choreutis achyrodes (Meyrick, 1912)
- Choreutis amethystodes (Meyrick, 1914)
- Choreutis basalis (Felder & Rogenhofer, 1875)
- Choreutis diplogramma (Meyrick, 1912)
- Choreutis fulminea Meyrick, 1912
- Choreutis hyligenes (Butler, 1879)
- Choreutis ophiosema (Lower, 1896)
- Choreutis orthogona (Meyrick, 1886)
- Choreutis semicincta (Meyrick, 1921)
- Choreutis sexfasciella (Sauber, 1902)
- Choreutis xanthogramma (Meyrick, 1912)
- Choreutis yakushimensis (Marumo, 1923)
- Litobrenthia grammodes Diakonoff, 1979
- Litobrenthia stephanephora Diakonoff, 1979
- Saptha angustistriata Issiki, 1930
- Saptha beryllitis (Meyrick, 1910)
- Saptha divitiosa Walker, 1864
- Saptha pretiosa (Walker, 1866)

== Coleophoridae ==
- Coleophora citrarga Meyrick, 1934

== Cosmopterigidae ==
- Ashibusa jezoensis Matsumura, 1931
- Balionebris bacteriota Meyrick, 1935
- Cosmopterix attenuatella (Walker, 1864)
- Cosmopterix brachyclina Meyrick, 1933
- Cosmopterix issikiella Kuroko, 1957
- Cosmopterix lienigiella Zeller, 1846
- Labdia bitabulata Meyrick, 1935
- Labdia citrama (Meyrick, 1915)
- Labdia promacha (Meyrick, 1897)
- Labdia semicoccinae (Stainton, 1859)
- Metagrypa tetrarrhycha Meyrick, 1933
- Passalotis irianthes Meyrick, 1932
- Persicoptila leucosarca Meyrick, 1936
- Placoptila semioceros (Meyrick, 1935)
- Pyroderces nephelopyrrha (Meyrick, 1917)
- Pyroderces simplex Walsingham, 1891
- Rhadinastis serpula Meyrick, 1932
- Stagmatophora leptarga Meyrick, 1914
- Stagmatophora urantha Meyrick, 1914
- Syntomaula simulatella (Walker, 1864)

== Cossidae ==
- Holcocerus vicarinus (Walker, 1865)
- Phragmataecia castaneae (Huebner, 1790)
- Phragmataecia cinnamomea Wileman, 1911
- Phragmataecia fusca Wileman, 1911
- Ratarda excellens (Strand, 1917)
- Shisa excellens Strand, 1917
- Squamura discipuncta (Wileman, 1915)
- Xyleutes strix (Linnaeus, 1758)
- Xyleutes unimaculosa (Matsumura, 1931)
- Zeuzera coffeae Nietner, 1861
- Zeuzera indica Herrich-Schaeffer, 1854
- Zeuzera multistrigata Moore, 1881

== Crambidae ==
- Achyra massalis Walker, 1859
- Achyra takowensis Maes, 1987
- Acropentias aurea Butler, 1878
- Aediodina quaternalis Lederer, 1863
- Aethaloessa calidalis Guenee, 1854
- Aetholix flavibasalis Guenée, 1863
- Agassiziella hapilista (Swinhoe, 1892)
- Agathodes ostentalis Geyer, 1837
- Agrotera basinotata Hampson, 1891
- Agrotera discinotata Swinhoe, 1894
- Agrotera ornata Wileman & South, 1917
- Agrotera scissalis Walker, 1866
- Analthes contortalis Hampson, 1900
- Analthes euryterminalis Hampson, 1918
- Analthes insignis Butler, 1881
- Analthes semitritalis Lederer, 1863
- Analthes taihokualis Strand, 1918
- Anania pata (Strand, 1918)
- Ancylolomia japonica Zeller, 1877
- Angustalius malacelloides Błeszyński, 1955
- Antigastra catalaunalis Duponchel, 1833
- Ategumia adipalis Lederer, 1863
- Autocharis amethystina Swinhoe, 1894
- Bocchoris inspersalis Zeller, 1852
- Botyodes asialis Guenee, 1854
- Botyodes diniasalis Walker, 1859
- Botyodes principalis Leech, 1889
- Bradina atopalis Yamanaka, 1984
- Bradina aulacodialis Strand, 1919
- Bradina diagonalis Guenee, 1854
- Bradina erilitoides Strand, 1919
- Bradina geminalis Caradja, 1927
- Bradina melanoperas Hampson, 1896
- Calamotropha anticella Walker, 1866
- Calamotropha baibarellus Shibuya, 1928
- Calamotropha caesella Walker, 1863
- Calamotropha formosella Błeszyński, 1961
- Calamotropha franki Caradja, 1931
- Calamotropha paludella Hübner, [1824]
- Calamotropha subterminellus Wileman & South, 1917
- Callibotys carapina Strand, 1918
- Camptomastix hisbonalis Walker, 1859
- Cangetta rectilinea Moore, 1886
- Cataclysta angulata Moore, 1885
- Ceratarcha umbrosa Swinhoe, 1894
- Chabula acamasalis Walker, 1859
- Chabula onychinalis Guenee, 1854
- Chabula telphusalis Walker, 1859
- Chabula trivitralis Swinhoe, 1895
- Charltoniada apicenotata Hampson, 1919
- Charltoniada difficilis Strand, 1919
- Chilo auricilius Dudgeon, 1905
- Chilo infuscatellus Snellen, 1890
- Chilo pulveratus Wileman & South, 1927
- Chilo sacchariphagus Bojer, 1856
- Chilo suppressalis Walker, 1863
- Chrysoteuchia sonobei Marumo, 1936
- Circobotys aurealis Leech, 1889
- Circobotys elegans Munroe & Mutuura, 1969
- Circobotys elongata Munroe & Mutuura, 1969
- Circobotys pallida Moore, 1888
- Cirrhochrista bracteolalis Hampson, 1891
- Cirrhochrista brizoalis Walker, 1859
- Cirrhochrista fuscusa Chen, Song & Wu, 2006
- Cirrhochrista kosemponialis Strand, 1919
- Cirrhochrista spissalis (Guenee, 1854)
- Clupeosoma cinereum Warren, 1892
- Clupeosoma suffusum Walker, [1866]
- Cnaphalocrocis medinalis Guenee, 1854
- Cnaphalocrocis pauperalis (Strand, 1918)
- Condega obscurata Moore, 1886
- Condega syleptalis (Strand, 1918)
- Conogethes parvipunctalis Inoue & Yamanaka, 2006
- Conogethes pinicolalis Inoue & Yamanaka, 2006
- Conogethes punctiferalis Guenee, 1854
- Cotachena pubescens Warren, 1892
- Cotachena taiwanalis Yamanaka, 2001
- Crambostenia angustifimbrialis Swinhoe, 1890
- Crambus kumatakellus Shibuya, 1928
- Crambus narcissus Błeszyński, 1961
- Crambus niitakaensis Marumo, 1936
- Crambus tomanaellus Marumo, 1936
- Crocidolomia binotalis Zeller, 1852
- Crocidolomia suffusalis Hampson, 1891
- Crypsiptya coclesalis (Walker, 1859)
- Culladia admigratella Walker, 1863
- Culladia hastiferalis Walker, [1866]
- Cymoriza interruptalis Wileman & South, 1917
- Cymoriza irrectalis Guenee, 1854
- Cymoriza taiwanalis Shibuya, 1928
- Daulia afralis Walker, 1859
- Diaphania indica Saunders, 1851
- Diasemia accalis Walker, 1859
- Diasemia calcaralis Strand, 1918
- Diasemia lepidoneuralis Strand, 1918
- Diasemia reticularis Linnaeus, 1761
- Diasemia taiwanalis Shibuya, 1928
- Diasemiopsis ramburialis Duponchel, [1834]
- Diathrausta brevifascialis Wileman, 1911
- Diathrausta profundalis Lederer, 1863
- Diplopseustis perieresalis Walker, 1859
- Discothyris ferruginata Moore, 1888
- Drosophantis corusca Meyrick, 1935
- Dysallacta negatalis Walker, 1859
- Elophila difflualis (Snellen, 1880)
- Elophila nigralbalis Caradja, 1925
- Elophila turbata Butler, 1881
- Endocrossis caldusalis (Walker, 1859)
- Eoophyla conjunctalis Wileman & South, 1917
- Eoophyla gibbosalis Guenee, 1854
- Eoophyla gibbosalis (Guenée, 1854)
- Eristena bifurcalis Pryer, 1877
- Eschata miranda Belszynski, 1965
- Euchromius lushanus Inoue, 1989
- Euclasta defamatalis Walker, 1859
- Eudonia gigantea Sasaki, 1998
- Eudonia inouei Sasaki, 1998
- Eudonia owadai Sasaki, 1998
- Eudonia promiscua Wileman & South, 1919
- Eudonia taiwanalpina Sasaki, 1998
- Eudonia umbrosa Sasaki, 1998
- Eugauria albidentata Hampson, 1897
- Eurrhyparodes accessalis Walker, 1859
- Eurrhyparodes tricoloralis Zeller, 1852
- Eusabena miltochristalis Hampson, 1896
- Eusabena setinalis Hampson, 1918
- Eutectona machoeralis Walker, 1859
- Eutectona rubicundalis Warren, 1896
- Gargela xanthocasis Meyrick, 1897
- Glaucocharis tripunctata Moore, 1888
- Glyphodes actorionalis Walker, 1859
- Glyphodes bivitralis Guenee, 1854
- Glyphodes canthusalis Walker, 1859
- Glyphodes chalybifascia Hampson, 1896
- Glyphodes chilka Moore, 1888
- Glyphodes crithealis Walker, 1859
- Glyphodes duplicalis Inoue, Munroe & Mutuura, 1981
- Glyphodes eurytusalis Walker, 1859
- Glyphodes formosanus Shibuya, 1928
- Glyphodes itysalis Walker, 1859
- Glyphodes perspectalis Walker, 1859
- Glyphodes pyloalis Walker, 1859
- Glyphodes stolalis Guenee, 1854
- Goniorhynchus butyrosus Butler, 1879
- Gynenomis sericealis Wileman & South, 1917
- Haritalodes delicatalis Strand, 1918
- Haritalodes derogata Fabricius, 1775
- Haritalodes lunalis Guenee, 1854
- Haritalodes mundalis South, 1901
- Haritalodes taiwanalis Shibuya, 1928
- Hellula undalis Fabricius, 1794
- Hendecasis duplifascialis Hampson, 1891
- Hendecasis hampsona South, 1901
- Hendecasis pulchella Hampson, 1916
- Herpetogramma basale Walker, [1866]
- Herpetogramma cynarale Walker, 1859
- Herpetogramma dilatatipes Walker, [1866]
- Herpetogramma elongalis Warren, 1892
- Herpetogramma fuscescens Warren, 1892
- Herpetogramma hipponalis Walker, 1859
- Herpetogramma hoozana Strand, 1918
- Herpetogramma licarsisale Walker, 1859
- Herpetogramma luctuosale Bremer, 1864
- Herpetogramma lulalis Strand, 1918
- Herpetogramma magna Butler, 1879
- Herpetogramma mimeticalis Hering, 1901
- Herpetogramma ochrimaculalis (South, 1901)
- Herpetogramma rudis Warren, 1892
- Herpetogramma subalbescens Swinhoe, 1894
- Hyalobathra brevialis Walker, 1859
- Hyalobathra coenostolalis Snellen, 1890
- Hyalobathra illectalis Walker, 1859
- Hyalobathra undulinea Hampson, 1891
- Hydriris chalybitis Meyrick, 1885
- Hydriris ornatalis Duponchel, 1832
- Hymenia perspectalis Hübner, 1796
- Isocentris filalis Guenee, 1854
- Lamprophaia albifimbrialis Walker, [1866]
- Leechia sinuosalis South, 1901
- Lepidoneura longipalpis Swinhoe, 1894
- Lepyrodes geometralis Guenee, 1854
- Leucinodella leucostola Hampson, 1896
- Leucinodes apicalis Hampson, 1896
- Leucinodes orbonalis Guenee, 1854
- Loxostege formosibia Strand, 1918
- Mabra eryxalis Walker, 1859
- Mabra nigriscripta Swinhoe, 1859
- Marasmia euryterminalis Hampson, 1917
- Marasmia latimarginalis Hampson, 1891
- Marasmia limbalis Wileman, 1911
- Marasmia pilosa Warren, 1896
- Marasmia poeyalis Boisduval, 1833
- Marasmia suspicalis Walker, 1859
- Maruca amboinalis Felder & Rogenhofer, 1874
- Maruca vitrata Fabricius, 1787
- Massepha absolutalis Walker, 1859
- Mecyna tapa (Strand, 1918)
- Mesolia bipunctella Wileman & South, 1918
- Metasia coniotalis Hampson, 1903
- Metasia masculina (Strand, 1918)
- Metoeca foedalis Guenee, 1854
- Metoeca nymphulalis (Strand, 1918)
- Micraglossa manoi Sasaki, 1998
- Microchilo kawabei Inoue, 1989
- Microchilo nigellus Sasaki, 1993
- Musotima colonalis Bremer, 1864
- Nacoleia biformis Butler, 1889
- Nacoleia charesalis Walker, 1859
- Nacoleia chrysorycta Meyrick, 1884
- Nacoleia commixta Butler, 1879
- Nacoloeia amplificata Warren, 1896
- Nausinoe perspectata (Fabricius, 1775)
- Nevrina procopia Stoll, 1781
- Nomis baibarensis Shibuya, 1928
- Nomophila noctuella Denis & Schiffermüller, 1775
- Noorda ignealis Hampson, 1899
- Notarcha euryclealis Walker, 1859
- Notarcha quaternalis Zeller, 1852
- Notesia tranquillalis Lederer, 1863
- Nymphicula blandialis (Walker, 1859)
- Nymphicula hampsoni (South, 1901)
- Nymphicula junctalis Hampson, 1891
- Nymphicula mesorphna Meyrick, 1894
- Nymphicula patnalis (Felder & Rogenhofer, 1874)
- Omiodes analis Snellen, 1880
- Omiodes bianoralis Walker, 1859
- Omiodes diemenalis Guenee, 1854
- Omiodes indicata Fabricius, 1775
- Omiodes karenkonalis Shibuya, 1928
- Omiodes noctescens Moore, 1888
- Omiodes perstygialis Hampson, 1912
- Omiodes pyraustalis (Strand, 1918)
- Omiodes sauterialis (Strand, 1918)
- Omiodes similis Moore, 1885
- Omiodes tristrialis Bremer, 1864
- Omphisa anastomosalis Guenee, 1854
- Orphanostigma abruptalis Walker, 1859
- Orthospila definita Butler, 1889
- Orthospila tigrina Moore, [1885]
- Ostrinia scapulalis Walker, 1859
- Ostrinia zealis Guenee, 1854
- Ostrinia furnacalis Guenee, 1854
- Pachybotys spissalis Guenee, 1854
- Pachynoa sabelialis Guenee, 1854
- Pachynoa thoosalis Walker, 1859
- Pagyda arbiter Butler, 1879
- Pagyda auroralis Moore, 1888
- Pagyda botydalis Snellen, 1882
- Pagyda lustralis Snellen, 1890
- Pagyda nebulosa Wileman & South, 1917
- Pagyda quadrilineata Butler, 1881
- Paliga anpingialis (Strand, 1918)
- Paliga auratalis Warren, 1895
- Paliga celatalis Walker, 1859
- Paliga deductalis Walker, 1859
- Paliga endotrichialis Hampson, 1918
- Paliga schenklingi Strand, 1918
- Palpita annulata Fabricius, 1794
- Palpita annulifer Inoue, 1996
- Palpita asiaticalis Inoue, 1994
- Palpita candidata Inoue, 1996
- Palpita homalia Inoue, 1996
- Palpita hypohomalia Inoue, 1996
- Palpita nigropunctalis Inoue, 1994
- Palpita ochrocosta Inoue, 1996
- Palpita pajnii Kirti & Rose, 1992
- Palpita sejunctalis Inoue, 1997
- Palpita warrenalis (Swinhoe, 1894)
- Paracymoriza cataclystalis (Strand, 1919)
- Paracymoriza distinctalis (Leech, 1899)
- Paracymoriza laminalis Hampson, 1901
- Paracymoriza prodigalis (Leech, 1899)
- Paracymoriza taiwanalis Wileman & South, 1917
- Paracymoriza vagalis Walker, [1866]
- Paranacoleia lophophoralis Hampson, 1896
- Parapoynx crisonalis Walker, 1859
- Parapoynx diminutalis Snellen, 1880
- Parapoynx fluctuosalis Zeller, 1852
- Parapoynx stagnalis Zeller, 1852
- Parapoynx villidalis Walker, 1859
- Parapoynx vittalis (Bremer, 1864)
- Paratalanta taiwanensis Yamanaka, 1972
- Parbattia arisana Munroe & Mutuura, 1971
- Parotis athysanota Hampson, 1912
- Parotis laceritalis (Kenrick,1907)
- Parotis margarita Hampson, 1893
- Parotis suralis Lederer, 1863
- Parthenodes prodigalis Leech, 1889
- Patissa fulvosparsa Butler, 1881
- Patissa nigropunctata Wileman & South, 1918
- Patissa virginea Zeller, 1852
- Pelena bimaculalis Shibuya, 1928
- Pelena obscuralis Swinhoe, 1895
- Pelena sericea Butler, 1879
- Perinephela lancealis Munroe & Mutuura, 1968
- Phalangiodes perspectatus Fabricius, 1775
- Physematia defloralis Strand, 1919
- Piletocera aegimiusalis Walker, 1859
- Piletocera elongalis Warren, 1896
- Placosaris taiwanalis Shibuya, 1928
- Pleuroptya austa Strand, 1918
- Pleuroptya balteata Fabricius, 1798
- Pleuroptya chlorophanta Butler, 1878
- Pleuroptya costalis Moore, 1888
- Pleuroptya deficiens Moore, 1887
- Pleuroptya haryoalis Strand, 1918
- Pleuroptya inferior Hampson, 1898
- Pleuroptya iopasalis Walker, 1859
- Pleuroptya pernitescens Swinhoe, 1894
- Pleuroptya punctimarginalis Hampson, 1896
- Pleuroptya quadrimaculalis Kollar, 1844
- Pleuroptya rubellalis Snellen, 1890
- Pleuroptya ruralis Scopoli, 1763
- Pleuroptya sabinusalis Walker, 1859
- Pleuroptya scinisalis Walker, 1859
- Pleuroptya sellalis Guenee, 1854
- Pleuroptya ultimalis Walker, 1859
- Polythlipta divaricata Moore, [1886]
- Polythlipta maceratalis Lederer, 1863
- Pramadea crotonalis Walker, 1859
- Preneopogon catenalis Wileman, 1911
- Prionapteron tenebrella Hampson, 1895
- Pronomis austa (Strand, 1918)
- Pronomis flavicolor Munroe & Mutuura, 1968
- Prophantis adusta Inoue, 1986
- Prorodes mimica Swinhoe, 1894
- Protonoceras capitale Fabricius, 1794
- Pseudargyria interruptella Walker, 1866
- Pseudocatharylla duplicella Hampson, 1895
- Pseudocatharylla infixella Walker, 1863
- Pseudocatharylla simplex Zeller, 1877
- Pycnarmon aeriferalis Moore, 1877
- Pycnarmon cribrata Fabricius, 1794
- Pycnarmon lactiferalis Walker, 1859
- Pycnarmon marginalis Snellen, 1890
- Pycnarmon meritalis Walker, 1859
- Pycnarmon pantherata Butler, 1878
- Pygospila tyres Cramer, [1780]
- Pyrausta flavofimbriata Moore, 1888
- Pyrausta incoloralis Guenee, 1854
- Pyrausta mystica Heppner, 2005
- Pyrausta obliquata Moore, 1888
- Pyrausta panopealis Walker, 1859
- Rehimena phrynealis Walker, 1859
- Rehimena surusalis Walker, 1859
- Rhectothyris gratiosalis Walker, 1859
- Roxita bipunctella Wileman & South, 1917
- Sameodes aptalis Walker, [1866]
- Sameodes cancellalis Zeller, 1852
- Scirpophaga excerptalis Walker, 1863
- Scirpophaga fusciflua Hampson, 1893
- Scirpophaga incertulas Walker, 1863
- Scirpophaga nivella Fabricius, 1794
- Scirpophaga praelata Scopoli, 1763
- Scirpophaga virginia Schultze, 1908
- Scirpophaga xanthogastrella Walker, 1863
- Scirpophaga xanthopygata Schawerda, 1922
- Scoparia subgracilis Sasaki, 1998
- Scoparia taiwanensis Sasaki, 1998
- Sinibotys evenoralis Walker, 1859
- Sinibotys habisalis Walker, 1859
- Sinibotys nectariphila Strand, 1918
- Sisyrophora pfeifferae Lederer, 1863
- Spoladea recurvalis Fabricius, 1775
- Stenia charonialis (Walker, 1859)
- Stenia minoralis Snellen, 1880
- Strepsinoma hapilistalis Strand, 1919
- Surattha albistigma Wileman & South, 1918
- Syngamia falsidicalis Walker, 1859
- Syngamia latimarginalis Walker, 1859
- Syngamia vibiusalis Walker, 1859
- Talanga nympha Butler, 1880
- Tatobotys depalpalis Strand, 1919
- Tatobotys janapalis Walker, 1859
- Tenerobotys subfumalis Munroe & Mutuura, 1971
- Terastia meticulosalis Guenee, 1854
- Tetridia caletoralis Walker, 1859
- Thliptoceras artatale Caradja, 1925
- Thliptoceras cascalis Swinhoe, 1890
- Thliptoceras formosanum Munroe & Mutuura, 1968
- Thliptoceras gladiale Leech, 1889
- Thysanoidma octalis Hampson, 1891
- Toxobotys nea (Strand, 1918)
- Trichophysetis rufoterminalis Christoph, 1881
- Tylostega photias Meyrick, 1894
- Tylostega tylostegalis Hampson, 1900
- Tyspanodes hypsalis Warren, 1891
- Tyspanodes striatus Butler, 1879
- Udea conubialis Yamanaka, 1972
- Udea lolotialis Caradja, 1927
- Udea poliostolalis Hampson, 1918
- Udea stigmatalis Heppner, 2005
- Udea testacea Butler, 1879
- Udonomeiga vicinalis South, 1901
- Uresiphita dissipatalis Lederer, 1863
- Uresiphita gracilis Bulter, 1879
- Uresiphita quinquigera Moore, 1888
- Uresiphita tricolor Butler, 1879
- Uthinia albisingnalis Hampson, 1896

== Drepanidae ==
- Agnidra scabiosa (Bryk, 1949)
- Albara reversaria Warren, 1897
- Amphitorna purpureofascia (Wileman, 1911)
- Auzatellodes arizana (Wileman, 1911)
- Auzata minuta Inoue, 1988
- Auzata simpliciata Warren, 1897
- Callicilix abraxata (Oberthür, 1893)
- Callidrepana patrana (Moore, [1866])
- Canucha miranda Matsumura, 1931
- Cyclidia substigmaria (Hübner, 1831)
- Demopsestis formosana Yoshimoto, 1983
- Deroca hidda Inoue, 1988
- Dipriodonta minima Inoue, 1988
- Ditrigona conflexaria (Strand, [1917])
- Ditrigona triangularia (Moore, 1868)
- Drapetodes mitaria Guenée, 1857
- Drepana pallida Okano, 1959
- Epipsestis bilineata Yoshimoto, 1984
- Epipsestis cortigera Yoshimoto, 1995
- Epipsestis dubia László & Ronkay, 1999
- Epipsestis manmiaoyangi László & Ronkay, 1999
- Epipsestis meilingchani László & Ronkay, 1999
- Epipsestis nikkoensis (Matsumura, 1921)
- Habrosyne albipuncta (Wileman, 1910)
- Habrosyne fraterna Werny, 1966
- Habrosyne indica Werny, 1966
- Habrosyne petrographa Werny, 1966
- Horipsestis aenea (Wileman, 1911)
- Horipsestis mushana (Matsumura, 1931)
- Horithyatira takamukui (Matsumura, 1921)
- Leucobrepsis fenestraria (Moore, 1868)
- Leucobrepsis taiwanensis Buchsbaum & Miller, 2003
- Macrauzata fenestraria Inoue, 1988
- Macrauzata minor Okano, 1959
- Macrocilix maia (Leech, 1888)
- Macrocilix mysticata Inoue, 1988
- Macrothyatira conspicua (Leech, 1900)
- Macrothyatira flavida (Butler, 1885)
- Macrothyatira flavimargo (Wileman, 1910)
- Microblepsis manleyi Inoue, 1988
- Microblepsis rugosa (Watson, 1968)
- Microblepsis violacea (Bulter, 1889)
- Microcilix abraxata (Oberthr, 1893)
- Neotogaria saitonis Matsumura, 1931
- Nordstromia semililacina Inoue, 1992
- Nothoploca endoi Yoshimoto, 1983
- Oreta brunnea Wileman, 1911
- Oreta extensa Walker, 1855
- Oreta fuscopurpurea Inoue, 1956
- Oreta griseotincta Hampson, [1893]
- Oreta insignis (Butler, 1877)
- Oreta loochooana Swinhoe, 1902
- Parpsestis argenteopicta (Wileman, 1911)
- Parpsestis tomponis (Matsumura, 1933)
- Phalacra kagiensis Wileman, 1916
- Phalacra strigata Inoue, 1988
- Psidopala kishidai Yoshimoto, 1987
- Psidopala pennata (Wileman, 1914)
- Psidopala shirakii (Matsumura, 1931)
- Sewa taiwana (Wileman, 1911)
- Strepsigonia diluta (Matsumura, 1927)
- Takapsestis wilemaniella Matsumura, 1933
- Tethea ampliata Okano, 1959
- Tethea consimilis (Matsumura, 1931)
- Tethea oberthueri (Matsumura, 1931)
- Tethea octogesima (Matsumura, 1931)
- Thyatira batis Matsumura, 1933
- Tridrepana arikana (Matsumura, 1921)
- Tridrepana flava (Moore, 1879)
- Tridrepana unispina Watson, 1957
- Wernya fufifasciata Yoshimoto, 1987
- Zusidava serratilinea (Wileman, 1917)

== Elachistidae ==
- Aeolanthes brochias Meyrick, 1938
- Aeolanthes erythrantis Meyrick, 1935
- Agonopterix costaemaculella (Christoph, 1882)
- Deuterogonia chionoxantha (Meyrick, 1931)
- Deuterogonia pudorina (Wocke, 1857)
- Elachista amamii Parenti, 1983
- Elachista miscanthi Parenti, 1983
- Ethmia assamensis (Butler, 1879)
- Ethmia crocosoma Meyrick, 1914
- Ethmia dentata Diakonoff & Sattler, 1966
- Ethmia epitrocha (Meyrick, 1914)
- Ethmia lapidella (Walsingham, 1880)
- Ethmia lineatonotella (Moore, 1867)
- Ethmia maculata Sattler, 1967
- Ethmia maculifera (Matsumura, 1931)
- Ethmia nigroapicella (Saalmueller, 1880)
- Ethmia octanoma Meyrick, 1914
- Ethmia okinawana (Matsumura, 1931)
- Ethmia penesella Kun & Szaboky, 2000
- Ethmia praeclara Meyrick, 1910
- Ethmia pseudozygospila Kun & Szaboky, 2000
- Ethmia susa Kun & Szaboky, 2000
- Ethmia zygospila Meyrick, 1934
- Synchalara rhombota (Meyrick, 1907)

== Epermeniidae ==
- Epermenia fuscomaculata Kuroko & Gaedike, 2006
- Sinicaepermenia taiwanella Heppner, 1990

== Epicopeiidae ==
- Epicopeia hainesii Okano, 1973
- Epicopeia mencia Moore, 1874

== Epipyropidae ==
- Epipomponia nawai (Dyar, 1904)

== Eriocottidae ==
- Compsoctena pinguis (Meyrick, 1914)
- Eriocottis flavicephalana Issiki, 1930

== Eupterotidae ==
- Apha arisana Matsumura, 1927
- Apha horishana Matsumura, 1927
- Apona fuliginosa Kishida, 1993
- Ganisa postica Matsumura, 1931
- Palirisa cervina Matsumura, 1931

== Galacticidae ==
- Homadaula anisocentra Meyrick, 1922

== Gelechiidae ==
- Anacampsis anisogramma Meyrick, 1927
- Anarsia aspera Park, 1995
- Anarsia choana Park, 1995
- Anarsia elongata Park, 1995
- Anarsia euphorodes Meyrick, 1922
- Anarsia isogona Meyrick, 1913
- Anarsia patulella Walker, 1864
- Anarsia protensa Park, 1995
- Anarsia tricornis Meyrick, 1913
- Aristotelia citrocosma Meyrick, 1908
- Athrips polymaculella Park, 1991
- Brachmia insuavis Meyrick, 1914
- Capidentalis salicicola Park, 1995
- Carpatolechia flavipunctatella Park, 1992
- Clepsimacha eriocrossa Meyrick, 1934
- Coconympha cyanorma Meyrick, 1934
- Dendrophilia neotaphronoma Ponomarenko, 1993
- Dendrophilia acris Park, 1995
- Dendrophilia obscurella Park, 1993
- Dendrophilia petrinopsis (Meyrick, 1935)
- Dendrophilia saxigera Meyrick, 1931
- Dichomeris aculata Park, 2001
- Dichomeris acuminata Staudinger, 1876
- Dichomeris albula Park & Hodges, 1995
- Dichomeris angulata Park & Hodges, 1995
- Dichomeris autometra Meyrick, 1934
- Dichomeris bucinaria Park, 1996
- Dichomeris crambalaeus Meyrick, 1913
- Dichomeris cymatodes Meyrick, 1916
- Dichomeris davisi Park & Hodges, 1995
- Dichomeris elegans Park, 2001
- Dichomeris ferruginosa Meyrick, 1913
- Dichomeris fusca Park & Hodges, 1995
- Dichomeris fuscalis Park & Hodges, 1995
- Dichomeris heriguronis Matsumura
- Dichomeris ioplaca Meyrick, 1934
- Dichomeris linealis Park & Hodges, 1995
- Dichomeris lividula Park & Hodges, 1995
- Dichomeris loxospila (Meyrick, 1932)
- Dichomeris lushanae Park & Hodges, 1995
- Dichomeris malacodes Meyrick, 1910
- Dichomeris microsphena Meyrick, 1921
- Dichomeris oceanis Meyrick, 1920
- Dichomeris ochreata Park & Hodges, 1995
- Dichomeris ochthophora Meyrick, 1936
- Dichomeris orientis Park & Hodges, 1995
- Dichomeris oxycarpa Meyrick, 1935
- Dichomeris pyrroschista Meyrick, 1934
- Dichomeris rasilella Herrich-Schaeffer, 1855
- Dichomeris summata Meyrick, 1913
- Dichomeris symmetrica Park & Hodges, 1995
- Dichomeris taiwana Park & Hodges, 1995
- Dichomeris trilobella Park & Hodges, 1995
- Evippe albidorsella Snellen, 1884
- Faristenia obliqua Park, 2000
- Helcystogramma arotraeum Meyrick, 1894
- Helcystogramma hassenzanensis Park & Hodges, 1995
- Helcystogramma hibisci Stainton, 1859
- Helcystogramma triannulella Herrich-Schaeffer, 1854
- Helcystogramma trijunctum Meyrick, 1934
- Homochelas epichthonia Meyrick, 1935
- Homochelas heppneri Park, 1995
- Homochelas scriniata Meyrick, 1913
- Hypatima arignota Meyrick, 1916
- Hypatima disetosella Park, 1995
- Hypatima excellentella Ponomarenko, 1991
- Hypatima iophana Meyrick, 1913
- Hypatima issikiana Park, 1995
- Hypatima leptopalta Meyrick, 1934
- Hypatima leptoptopal Meyrick, 1934
- Hypatima ovata Park, 1999
- Hypatima rhomboidella Linnaeus, 1758
- Hypatima spathota Meyrick, 1913
- Idiophantis chiridota Meyrick, 1914
- Mesophleps sublutiana Park, 1990
- Paralida triannulata Clarke, 1958
- Parastenolechia asymmetrica Kanazawa, 1985
- Parastenolechia claustrifera Meyrick, 1935
- Pectinophora gossypiella Saunders, 1844
- Phrixocrita aegidopis Meyrick, 1935
- Polyhymno pancratiastis Meyrick, 1921
- Polyhymno synodonta Meyrick, 1936
- Scrobipalpa heliopa Lower, 1900
- Sitotroga cerealella Olivier, 1789
- Stegasta jejuensis Park & Omelko, 1994
- Thiotricha acrophantis Meyrick, 1936
- Thiotricha dissobola Meyrick, 1934
- Thiotricha microrrhoda Meyrick, 1935
- Thyrsostoma glaucitis Meyrick, 1907
- Thyrsostoma pylartis Meyrick, 1908
- Tituacia deviella Walker, 1864

== Geometridae ==
- Abaciscus alishanensis Inoue, 1978
- Abaciscus changi Sato, 1997
- Abaciscus costimacula (Wileman, 1912)
- Abaciscus tristis Butler, 1889
- Abraxas adilluminata Inoue, 1984
- Abraxas antinebulosa Inoue, 1984
- Abraxas consputa Bastelberger, 1909
- Abraxas cupreilluminata Inoue, 1984
- Abraxas fletcheri Inoue, 1984
- Abraxas formosilluminata Inoue, 1984
- Abraxas illuminata Warren, 1894
- Abraxas parvimiranda Inoue, 1984
- Abraxas persimplex Inoue, 1984
- Abraxas placata Inoue, 1984
- Abraxas stictotaenia Wehrli, 1932
- Abraxas submartiaris Wehrli, 1932
- Abraxas suspecta Warren, 1894
- Abraxas taiwanensis Inoue, 1984
- Abraxas tenellula Inoue, 1984
- Abraxas tenuisuffusa Inoue, 1984
- Abraxas wilemani Inoue, 1984
- Acasis viretata Prout, 1958
- Achrosis pulchra (Wileman, 1914)
- Acolutha pictaria Warren, 1905
- Acolutha pulchella Warren, 1905
- Acrodontis aenigma (Prout, 1914)
- Acrodontis mystica Kobayashi, 1998
- Aethalura duplicata (Wileman, 1911)
- Aethalura lushanalis Sato, 1987
- Agaraeus discolor (Warren, 1893)
- Agaraeus formosanus (Bastelberger, 1911)
- Agaraeus luteus (Wileman, 1910)
- Agathia diversiformis Warren, 1894
- Agathia hemithearia Guenee, 1857
- Agathia laetata (Fabricius, 1794)
- Agathia lycaenaria (Kollar, 1844)
- Agathia magnificentia Inoue, 1978
- Agathia visenda Prout, 1917
- Alcis admissaria Guenée, 1858
- Alcis anmashanensis Sato, 1999
- Alcis arizana Wileman, 1911
- Alcis ectogramma (Wehrli, 1934)
- Alcis hyberniata Bastelberger, 1909
- Alcis maculata (Moore, 1867)
- Alcis nubeculosa (Bastelberger, 1909)
- Alcis pallens Inoue, 1978
- Alcis plebeia Wileman, 1912
- Alcis postlurida Inoue, 1978
- Alcis rubicunda Bastelberger, 1909
- Alcis scortea (Bastelberger, 1909)
- Alcis semiusta (Bastelberger, 1909)
- Alcis subpunctata Wileman, 1911
- Alcis taiwanensis Inoue, 1978
- Alcis taiwanovariegata (Wileman & South, 1917)
- Alcis tayulina Sato, 1990
- Amblychia angeronaria Guenee, 1857
- Amblychia moltrechti (Bastelberger, 1909)
- Amblychia sauteri (Prout, 1914)
- Amoebotricha hiemalis Inoue, 1989
- Amraica asahinai (Inoue, 1964)
- Amraica superans (Sato, 1981)
- Anectropis fumigata Sato, 1991
- Anectropis semifascia (Bastelberger, 1909)
- Anisephyra ocularia (Fabricius, 1775)
- Anisodes effeminatus Prout, 1914
- Anthyria grataria Wlk.
- Anticlea canaliculata Warren, 1896
- Antilycauges pinguis (Swinhoe, 1902)
- Antipercnia cordiforma (Inoue, 1978)
- Antitrygodes divisaria Prout, 1914
- Apithecia viridata Prout, 1931
- Aplochlora costipicta (Wileman, 1915)
- Aplochlora grata (Butler, 1880)
- Aplochlora viridis Warren, 1893
- Aplochlora vivilaca Walker, 1861
- Apochima praeacutaria (Inoue, 1976)
- Aracima serrata Wileman, 1911
- Archaeocasis micradelpha (Prout, 1958)
- Ardonis filicata (Swinhoe, 1892)
- Argyrocosma inductaria (Guenée, [1858])
- Arichanna albomacularia Leech, 1891
- Arichanna interplagata (Guenee, 1857)
- Arichanna jaguararia Sato, 1999
- Arichanna maculosa Wileman, 1912
- Arichanna marginata Warren, 1893
- Arichanna ochrivena Wileman, 1915
- Arichanna olivescens Wileman&South, 1917
- Arichanna picaria Wileman, 1910
- Arichanna postflava Wileman, 1914
- Arichanna pryeraria Leech, 1891
- Arichanna sinica Inoue, 1978
- Arichanna vernalis Fu & Sato, 2010
- Ascotis selenaria (Walker, 1860)
- Asthena melanosticta Wehrli, 1924
- Asthena undulata (Wileman, 1915)
- Atopophysa candidula Inoue, 1986
- Atopophysa lividata (Bastelberger, 1909)
- Atopophysa opulens Prout, 1914
- Auaxa cesadaria Walker, 1860
- Auaxa mimosina Inoue, 1992
- Axinoptera anticostalis Galsworthy, 1999
- Axinoptera taiwana Inoue, 2002
- Berta rugosivalva Galsworthy, 1997
- Berta zygophyxia Prout, 1912
- Biston marginatus Shiraki, 1913
- Biston melacron Wehrli, 1941
- Biston perclara (Warren, 1899)
- Biston regalis (Warren, 1899)
- Biston robustus Inoue, 1964
- Bizia aexaria Walker, 1860
- Blepharoctenucha virescens Inoue, 1986
- Borbacha pardaria (Guenee, 1857)
- Bosara atypha (Prout, 1958)
- Bosara corrobusta Inoue, 2002
- Bosara errabunda (Prout, 1958)
- Bosara obliterata Inoue, 2002
- Bosara porphyrea Inoue, 2002
- Bosara subrobusta (Inoue, 1988)
- Brabira artemidora Moore 1888
- Brabira costimacula Wileman, 1915
- Cabera niveopicta Inoue, 1986
- Calicha griseoviridata (Wileman, 1911)
- Calletaera basipuncta Wileman, 1916
- Calletaera postvittata (Walker, 1861)
- Calluga costalis Moore, 1887
- Callygris compositata (Wileman, 1912)
- Carige scutilimbata Prout, 1936
- Catoria olivescens Moore, 1888
- Catoria sublavaria (Guenee, 1857)
- Celenna festivaria (Inoue, 1964)
- Chaetolopha incurvata (Moore, 1888)
- Chalyboclydon marginata Warren, 1893
- Chartographa convexa (Wileman, 1912)
- Chartographa fabiolaria Inoue, 1989
- Chiasmia defixaria (Walker, 1861)
- Chiasmia eleonora (Cramer, 1780)
- Chiasmia elvirata (Guenee, 1857)
- Chiasmia emersaria (Walker, 1861)
- Chiasmia hebesata (Walker, 1861)
- Chiasmia inchoata (Walker, 1861)
- Chiasmia intermediaria (Leech, 1897)
- Chiasmia kanshireiensis (Wileman, 1914)
- Chiasmia monticolaria Wehrli, 1940
- Chiasmia normata (Walker, 1861)
- Chiasmia ozararia (Walker, 1860)
- Chiasmia perfusaria (Walker, 1866)
- Chiasmia pluviata (Fabricius, 1798)
- Chlorissa arcana Yazaki, 1993
- Chlorissa distinctaria (Walker, 1866)
- Chloroclystis blanda (Bastelberger, 1911)
- Chloroclystis dentatissima Warren, 1898
- Chloroclystis rubroviridis (Warren, 1896)
- Chloroclystis subrobusta (Inoue, 1988)
- Chlorodontopera discospilata (Moore, 1867)
- Chlorodontopera taiwana (Wileman, 1911)
- Chorodna corticaria (Inoue, 1986)
- Chorodna creataria (Guenée, [1858] )
- Chorodna ochreimacula Prout, 1914
- Chrioloba cinerea (Butler, 1880)
- Chrioloba costimacula (Wileman & South, 1917)
- Chrioloba etaina (Swinhoe, 1900)
- Chrioloba inobtrusa (Wileman & South, 1917)
- Chrysocrapeda faganaria (Guenée, [1858])
- Chrysocraspeda sanguinea Warren, 1896
- Cleora alienaria (Walker, 1860)
- Cleora contiguata (Moore, 1868)
- Cleora fraterna (Moore, 1888)
- Cleora injectaria (Walker, 1860)
- Cleora insolita (Butler, 1878)
- Cleora leucophaea Sato, 2002
- Cleora nigronotaria (Wileman, 1911)
- Cleora repulsaria (Walker, 1860)
- Collix ghosha Walker, 1862
- Collix praetenta Prout, 1929
- Collix stellata Warren 1894
- Comibaena argentataria Leech, 1897
- Comibaena cassidara (Guenée, [1858])
- Comibaena delicatior (Warren, 1897)
- Comibaena falcipennis (Yazaki, 1991)
- Comibaena pictipennis Bulter, 1880
- Comibaena procumbaria (Pryer, 1877)
- Comibaena subdelicata Inoue, 1985
- Comibaena takasago Okana, 1960
- Comostola enodata Inoue, 1986
- Comostola laesaria (Walker, 1861)
- Comostola meritaria (Walker, 1861)
- Comostola ocellulata Prout, 1920
- Comostola pyrrhogona (Walker, 1866)
- Comostola satoi Inoue, 1986
- Comostola subtiliaria Prout, 1917
- Corymica arnearia Walker, 1860
- Corymica deducta (Walker, 1866)
- Corymica pryeri Butler, 1878
- Corymica spatiosa Prout, 1925
- Corymica specularia (Moore, 1868)
- Crypsicometa homoema Prout, 1926
- Crypsicometa ochracea Inoue, 1971
- Cryptochorina polychroia (Wehrli, 1941)
- Culpinia diffusa (Walker, 1861)
- Cusiala boarmioides (Moore, 1888)
- Cyclophora effeminata (Prout, 1914)
- Cyclophora intermixtaria (Swinhoe, 1892)
- Cyclophora taiwana (Wileman, 1911)
- Cystidia stratonice (Stoll, 1782)
- Danala lilacina (Wileman, 1915)
- Darisa lampasaria (Hampson, 1895)
- Deileptenia rimosaria (Wileman, 1911)
- Derambila dentifera (Moore, 1888)
- Derambila fragilis (Butler, 1880)
- Descoreba simplex Okana, 1960
- Devenilia corearia (Prout, 1914)
- Dilophodes elegans Swinhoe, 1892
- Dindica kishidai Inoue, 1986
- Dindica polyphaenaria (Guenée, [1858])
- Dindica purpurata Bastelberger, 1911
- Dindica taiwana Wileman, 1914
- Dindica wilemani Prout, 1927
- Diplurodes vestitus Inoue, 1976
- Dischidesia cinerea (Bulter, 1880)
- Discoglypha hampsoni (Swinhoe, 1892)
- Discoglypha locupletata Prout, 1917
- Dissoplaga flava (Wang, 1998)
- Docirava flavilinata Wileman, 1915
- Dooabia alia Yazaki, 1997
- Doratoptera virescens Marumo, 1920
- Duliophyle agitata Sato, 2002
- Dysstroma calamistrata (Bastelberger, 1911)
- Dysstroma cinereata (Moore, 1868)
- Dysstroma dentifera (Warren 1896)
- Dysstroma fumata (Bastelberger, 1911)
- Dysstroma sikkimensis Heydemann, 1932
- Echthrocollix minuta (Butler, 1881)
- Ecliptopera benigna (Prout, 1914)
- Ecliptopera delecta (Butler, 1880)
- Ecliptopera fervidaria (Leech, 1897)
- Ecliptopera muscicolor Prout, 1931
- Ecliptopera recordans Prout, 1940
- Ecliptopera rectilinea Prout, 1940
- Ecliptopera triangulifera (Moore, 1888)
- Ecliptopera umbrosaria Prout, 1940
- Ectropis arizanensis Wileman, 1915
- Ectropis bhurmitra (Walker, 1860)
- Ectropis excellens (Butler, 1884)
- Eilicrinia flava (Moore, 1888)
- Electrophaes moltrechti Prout, 1940
- Electrophaes taiwana Inoue, 1986
- Electrophaes zaphenges Prout, 1940
- Endropiodes indictinarius (Bremer, 1864)
- Entomopteryx combusta (Warren, 1893)
- Entomopteryx rubridisca (Wileman, 1911)
- Eois grataria (Walker, 1861)
- Eois lunulosa (Wileman, 1911)
- Epilobophora nishizawai Yazaki, 1986
- Epilobophora venipicta (Wileman, 1914)
- Epirrita faenaria (Bastelberger, 1911)
- Epobeidia lucifera (Wehrli, 1933)
- Epobeidia tigrata (Inoue, 1986)
- Eriopithex recensitaria Walker, 1862
- Esakiopteryx venusta Yazaki, 1986
- Eschatarchia lineata Inoue, 1970
- Euchristophia cumulata Inoue, 1986
- Eucosmabraxas octoscripta (Wileman, 1912)
- Eucrostes disparata Walker, 1861
- Eucyclodes albotermina (Inoue, 1978)
- Eucyclodes biplagiata Rothschild
- Eucyclodes divapala (Walker, 1861)
- Eucyclodes gavissima (Walker, 1861)
- Eucyclodes lalashana (Inoue, 1986)
- Eucyclodes semialba (Walker, 1861)
- Eulithis subalba (Prout, 1941)
- Eumelea ludovicata Guenee, 1857
- Eupithecia acutipapillata Inoue, 1988
- Eupithecia albigutta Prout, 1958
- Eupithecia alishana Inoue, 1970
- Eupithecia assulata Bastelberger, 1911
- Eupithecia astricta Inoue, 1988
- Eupithecia blandula Mironov & Galsworthy, 2007
- Eupithecia centaureata [Denis & Schiffermüller], 1775
- Eupithecia chui Inoue, 1970
- Eupithecia clavifera Inoue, 1955
- Eupithecia concava Mironov & Galsworthy, 2007
- Eupithecia convexa Inoue, 1988
- Eupithecia costalis (Hampson, 1893)
- Eupithecia costimacularia Leech, 1897
- Eupithecia daemionata Dietze, 1903
- Eupithecia dealbata Inoue, 1988
- Eupithecia exrubicunda Inoue, 1988
- Eupithecia flavimacula Mironov & Galsworthy, 2007
- Eupithecia flavoapicaria Inoue, 1979
- Eupithecia flexicornuta Inoue, 1988
- Eupithecia funerea Inoue, 1988
- Eupithecia hashimotoi Inoue, 1988
- Eupithecia interpunctaria Inoue, 1979
- Eupithecia jezonica Matsumura, 1927
- Eupithecia karapinensis Wileman & South, 1917
- Eupithecia kudoi Inoue, 1983
- Eupithecia kuroshio Inoue, 1980
- Eupithecia lini Mironov & Galsworthy, 2007
- Eupithecia longipennata Inoue, 1988
- Eupithecia lupa Mironov & Galsworthy, 2007
- Eupithecia masculina Inoue, 1988
- Eupithecia megaproterva Inoue, 1988
- Eupithecia melanolopha Swinhoe, 1895
- Eupithecia nishizawai Inoue, 1988
- Eupithecia nuceistrigata Bastelberger, 1911
- Eupithecia pellicata Mironov & Galsworthy, 2007
- Eupithecia phantastica Mironov & Galsworthy, 2006
- Eupithecia proterva Butler, 1878
- Eupithecia quadripunctata Warren, 1888
- Eupithecia rhadine Mironov & Galsworthy, 2007
- Eupithecia rigida Swinhoe, 1892
- Eupithecia stataria Inoue, 1988
- Eupithecia tabidaria Inoue, 1955
- Eupithecia taiwana Wileman & South, 1917
- Eupithecia yazakii Inoue, 1988
- Eupithecia yoshimotoi Inoue, 1988
- Euryobeidia languidata (Walker, 1862)
- Euryobeidia largeteaui (Oberthur, 1884)
- Eustroma changi Inoue, 1986
- Eustroma contorta (Warren, 1900)
- Eustroma melancholica (Wileman, 1911)
- Evecliptopera decurrens (Prout, 1940)
- Fascellina chromataria Walker, 1860
- Fascellina plagiata (Walker, 1866)
- Fascellina subsignata Warren, 1893
- Gagitodes omnifasciaria (Inoue, 1998)
- Gandaritis sinicaria Wileman, 1920
- Garaeus apicata Bastelberger, 1911
- Garaeus argillacea (Butler, 1889)
- Garaeus specularis Moore, 1868
- Gasterocome pannosaria (Bastelberger, 1911)
- Glaucoclystis griseorufa (Hampson, 1898)
- Glaucoclystis satoi Inoue, 2002
- Gnamptopteryx perficita (Hampson, 1902)
- Gnophos ainuaria Bastelberger, 1909
- Gnophos caenosa (Bastelberger, 1911)
- Gnophos delitescens (Bastelberger, 1909)
- Gonanticlea aversa Swinhoe, 1892
- Gonanticlea ochreivittata (Bastelberger, 1909)
- Gonanticlea subfalcata Wileman, 1914
- Gonodontis pallida Butler, 1880
- Gymnoscelis albicaudata Warren, 1897
- Gymnoscelis deleta Hampson, 1891
- Gymnoscelis expedita (Prout, 1958)
- Gymnoscelis semialbida (Walker, 1866)
- Gymnoscelis tristrigosa (Butler, 1880)
- Harutaea flavizona Sato, 2000
- Harutalcis fumigata (Bastelberger, 1909)
- Hastina subfalcaria Moore, 1888
- Hemistola kezukai Inoue, 1978
- Hemistola monotona Inoue, 1983
- Hemistola orbiculosa Inoue, 1978
- Hemistola simplex Warren, 1899
- Hemistola tenuilinea (Alphéraky, 1897)
- Hemithea aquamarina Hampson, 1895
- Hemithea insularia (Guenee, 1857)
- Hemithea pallidimunda Inoue, 1986
- Hemithea tritonaria (Walker, [1863])
- Herochroma baibarana (Matsumura, 1931)
- Herochroma cristata (Warren, 1894)
- Herochroma ochreipicta (Swinhoe, 1905)
- Herochroma supraviridaria Inoue, 1999
- Heteralex aspersa (Matsumura, 1911)
- Heterocallia deformis Inoue, 1986
- Heterolocha arizana Wileman, 1910
- Heterolocha biplagiata Bastelberger, 1909
- Heterolocha coccinea Inoue, 1976
- Heterolocha lilacina (Bastelberger, 1909)
- Heterolocha marginata Wileman, 1910
- Heterolocha patalata Felder & Rogenhofer, 1875
- Heterolocha sabulosa (Bastelberger, 1909)
- Heterolocha taiwana Wileman, 1910
- Heterophleps confusa Prout, 1936
- Heterophleps taiwana (Wileman, 1911)
- Heterophleps variegata (Wileman, 1911)
- Heterophleps violescens (Wileman, 1911)
- Heterostegane hyriaria Warren, 1894
- Heterostegane subtessellata (Walker, 1863)
- Heterostegania lunulosa (Moore, 1888)
- Heterothera incerta (Inoue, 1986)
- Heterothera sororcula (Bastelberger, 1909)
- Hirasa punctivenaria (Wileman, 1912)
- Horisme macularia (Leech, 1897)
- Hydatocapnia gemina Yazaki, 1990
- Hydrelia arizana (Wileman, 1911)
- Hydrelia bicauliata Prout, 1914
- Hydrelia bicolorata (Moore 1868)
- Hydrelia enisaria Prout, 1926
- Hydrelia flammulata (Bastelberger, 1911)
- Hydrelia rubrivena Wileman, 1911
- Hydrelia ulula Bastelberger, 1911
- Hyperythra lutea (Stoll, 1787)
- Hypochrosis baenzigeri Inoue, 1982
- Hypochrosis insularis (Bastelberger, 1909)
- Hypochrosis rufescens (Bulter, 1880)
- Hypocometa clauda Warren, 1896
- Hypomecis brevifasciata (Wileman, 1911)
- Hypomecis cineracea (Moore, 1888)
- Hypomecis corticea (Bastelberger, 1911)
- Hypomecis formosana (Wileman, 1912)
- Hypomecis monotona (Inoue, 1978)
- Hypomecis nudicosta Inoue, 1983
- Hypomecis obliquisigna (Wileman, 1912)
- Hypomecis percnioides (Wehrli, 1943)
- Hypomecis punctinalis (Prout, 1914)
- Hypomecis roboraria (Wileman, 1911)
- Hyposidra aquilaria (Walker, 1862)
- Hyposidra infixaria (Walker, 1860)
- Hyposidra leucomela (Walker, 1866)
- Hyposidra talaca (Walker, 1860)
- Hysterura protagma Prout, 1940
- Idaea costiguttata (Warren, 1896)
- Idaea deleta (Wileman & South, 1917)
- Idaea denudaria (Prout, 1913)
- Idaea egenaria (Walker, 1861)
- Idaea indigata (Wileman, 1915)
- Idaea marcidaria (Walker, 1861)
- Idaea methaemaria (Hampson, 1903)
- Idaea muricolor (Warren, 1904)
- Idaea paraula (Prout, 1914)
- Idaea sakuraii (Inoue, 1963)
- Idaea sinicata (Walker, 1861)
- Idaea sugillata (Bastelberger, 1911)
- Idaea taiwana (Wileman & South, 1917)
- Idaea trisetata (Prout, 1922)
- Idiochlora ussuriaria (Leech, 1897)
- Idiotephria nakatomii Inoue, 1978
- Iotaphora admirabilis (Oberthür, 1883)
- Jankowskia taiwanensis Sato, 1980
- Jodis argentilineata (Wileman, 1916)
- Jodis inumbrata Warren, 1896
- Jodis nanda (Walker, 1861)
- Jodis rantaizanensis (Wileman, 1916)
- Krananda latimarginaria Leech, 1891
- Krananda lucidaria Leech, 1897
- Krananda oliveomarginata Swinhoe, 1894
- Krananda semihyalina Moore, 1867
- Laciniodes umbrosus Inoue, 1983
- Lampropteryx argentilineata (Leech, 1897)
- Lampropteryx chalybearia (Moore, 1868)
- Lampropteryx nishizawai Sato, 1990
- Lampropteryx synthetica Prout, 1922
- Lassaba brevipennis (Inoue, 1978)
- Lassaba hsuhonglini Fu & Sato, 2010
- Lassaba parvalbidaria (Inoue, 1978)
- Lassaba tayulingensis (Sato, 1986)
- Leptomiza calcearia (Walker, 1860)
- Lipomelia subusta Warren, 1893
- Lobogonia aculeata Wileman, 1911
- Lobogonia formosana (Bastelberger, 1909)
- Lobogonia sphagnata Bastelberger, 1911
- Lobogonodes permarmorata (Bastelberger, 1909)
- Lobogonodes taiwana (Wileman & South, 1917)
- Lomographa anoxys (Wehrli, 1936)
- Lomographa claripennis Inoue, 1977
- Lomographa guttalata Yazaki, 1994
- Lomographa inamata (Walker, 1861)
- Lomographa lungtanensis (Wehrli, 1939)
- Lomographa margarita (Moore, 1868)
- Lomographa perapicata (Wehrli, 1924)
- Lomographa percnosticta Yazaki, 1994
- Lomographa platyleucata (Wileman, 1914)
- Lomographa rara Yazaki, 1994
- Lophobates inchoata (Prout, 1914)
- Lophobates ochrolaria (Bastelberger, 1909)
- Lophophelma iterans (Inoue, 1970)
- Lophophelma taiwana Wileman, 1912
- Lophophleps informis (Warren, 1897)
- Lophophleps purpurea Hampson, 1891
- Loxaspilates arrizanaria Bastelberger, 1909
- Loxaspilates biformata Inoue, 1983
- Loxaspilates densihastigera Inoue, 1983
- Loxaspilates imitata (Bastelberger, 1909)
- Loxaspilates montuosa Inoue, 1983
- Loxaspilates nakajimai Inoue, 1983
- Loxotephria olivacea Warren, 1905
- Luxiaria amasa (Butler, 1878)
- Luxiaria costinota Inoue, 1978
- Luxiaria mitorrhaphes Prout, 1925
- Luxiaria obliquata Moore, 1888
- Macaria abydata Guenee, 1857
- Macaria acutaria Walker, 1869
- Martania albofasciata (Moore, 1888)
- Martania denigrata Inoue, 2004
- Martania obscurata (Bastelberger, 1909)
- Martania seriata (Moore, 1888)
- Martania sugii (Inoue, 1998)
- Martania taiwana (Wileman, 1911)
- Maxates acutigoniata (Inoue, 1989)
- Maxates ambigua (Bulter, 1878)
- Maxates extrambigua (Inoue, 1989)
- Maxates glaucaria (Walker, 1866)
- Maxates grandificaria (Graeser, 1890)
- Maxates illiturata (Walker, [1863])
- Maxates lactipuncta (Inoue, 1989)
- Maxates microdonta (Inoue, 1989)
- Maxates protrusa (Bulter, 1878)
- Maxates quadripunctata (Inoue, 1989)
- Maxates rufolimbata (Inoue, 1989)
- Maxates semiprotrusa (Inoue, 1989)
- Maxates sinuolata (Inoue, 1989)
- Maxates thetydaria (Guenee, 1857)
- Maxates versicauda (Prout, 1920)
- Melanthia catenaria Prout, 1939
- Melanthia procellata (Wehrli, 1931)
- Menophra anaplagiata Sato, 1984
- Menophra humeraria (Moore, 1868)
- Menophra mitsundoi Sato, 1984
- Menophra nakajimai Sato, 1984
- Menophra taiwana (Wileman, 1910)
- Mesastrape fulguraria (Walker, 1860)
- Mesoleuca costipannaria (Moore, 1868)
- Metabraxas rubrotincta Inoue, 1986
- Metallolophia arenaria (Leech, 1889)
- Meteima mediorufa (Bastelberger, 1911)
- Microcalcarifera fecunda (Swinhoe, 1891)
- Microcalicha fumosaria Sato, 1981
- Microcalicha melanosticta (Hampson, 1895)
- Microlygris complicata (Prout, 1940)
- Micronidia intermedia Yazaki, 1992
- Milionia zonea Druce, 1888
- Mimochroa olivescens (Wileman, 1914)
- Mixochlora vittata (Moore, 1867)
- Mnesiloba dentifascia (Hampson, 1891)
- Monocerotesa abraxides (Prout, 1914)
- Monocerotesa coalescens (Bastelberger, 1909)
- Monocerotesa conjuncta (Wileman, 1912)
- Monocerotesa flavescens Inoue, 1998
- Monocerotesa unifasciata Inoue, 1998
- Monocerotesa virgata (Wileman, 1912)
- Myrioblephara cilicornaria (Püngeler, 1904)
- Myrioblephara fenchihuana Sato, 1987
- Myrioblephara simplaria (Swinhoe, 1894)
- Myrteta angelica Butler, 1881
- Nadagara subnubila Inoue, 1967
- Nadagara umbrifera Wileman, 1910
- Nadagara vagaia Walker, 1862
- Naxa textillis Walker, 1856
- Naxidia punctata (Butler, 1880)
- Neohipparchus hypoleuca (Hampson, 1903)
- Neohipparchus vallatus (Bulter, 1878)
- Ninodes splendens (Butler, 1878)
- Ninodes watanabei Inoue, 1976
- Nipponogelasma chlorissodes (Prout, 1912)
- Nothomiza costalis (Moore, 1868)
- Nothomiza flavicosta Prout, 1914
- Obeidia tigrata Inoue, 1986
- Obeidia vagipardata Inoue, 2003
- Ocoelophora lentiginosaria (Bastelberger, 1911)
- Odontopera albiguttulata Bastelberger, 1909
- Odontopera bilinearia Inoue, 1986
- Odontopera insulata Bastelberger, 1909
- Oenospila flavifusata (Walker, 1861)
- Operophtera variabilis Nakajima, 1991
- Ophthalmitis albosignaria Sato, 1992
- Ophthalmitis cordularia (Swinhoe, 1893)
- Ophthalmitis herbidaria (Guenee, 1857)
- Ophthalmitis sinensium (Oberthür, 1913)
- Opisthograptis moelleri Warren, 1893
- Opisthograptis punctilineata Wileman, 1910
- Organopoda carnearia (Walker, 1861)
- Orothalassodes pervulgatus Inoue, 2005
- Orthobrachia simpliciata Yazaki, 2002
- Orthocabera sericea Butler, 1879
- Orthocabera tinagmaria (Guenee, 1857)
- Orthonama obstipata (Fabricius, 1794)
- Ourapteryx caecata (Bastelberger, 1911)
- Ourapteryx changi Inoue, 1985
- Ourapteryx clara Matsumura, 1910
- Ourapteryx flavovirens Inoue, 1985
- Ourapteryx inspersa Wileman, 1912
- Ourapteryx monticola Inoue, 1985
- Ourapteryx nigrociliaris Inoue, 1985
- Ourapteryx pallidula Inoue, 1985
- Ourapteryx ramosa (Wileman, 1910)
- Ourapteryx sciticaudaria Walker, 1862
- Ourapteryx similaria (Matsumura, 1910)
- Ourapteryx taiwana Wileman, 1910
- Ourapteryx variolaria Inoue, 1985
- Ourapteryx venusta Inoue, 1985
- Ourapteryx yerburii Matsumura, 1910
- Oxymacaria normata (Wehrli, 1932)
- Oxymacaria temeraria (Swinhoe, 1891)
- Oxymacaria truncaria (Leech, 1897)
- Ozola defectata Inoue, 1971
- Pachyodes subtritus (Prout, 1914)
- Palpoctenidia phoenicosoma Prout, 1939
- Pamphlebia rubrolimbraria (Guenee, 1857)
- Parabapta obliqua Yazaki, 1989
- Parabapta unifasciata Inoue, 1986
- Paracalicha psittacata (Bastelberger, 1909)
- Paradarisa chloauges Prout, 1927
- Paradarisa comparataria Wileman, 1911
- Paramaxates hainana Chu, 1981
- Paramaxates posterecta Holloway, 1976
- Paramaxates taiwana Yazaki, 1988
- Parapercnia giraffata (Guenee, 1857)
- Pareclipsis serrulata (Wehrli, 1937)
- Pareclipsis umbrata (Warren, 1894)
- Parectropis nigrosparsa (Wileman&South, 1917)
- Parectropis subflava (Bastelberger, 1909)
- Pasiphila palpata (Walker, 1862)
- Pelagodes antiquadrarius (Inoue, 1976)
- Pelagodes proquadrarius (Inoue, 1976)
- Pelagodes semengok Holloway, 1996
- Pelagodes subquadraria (Inoue, 1976)
- Pennithera fuliginosa Yazaki 2002
- Pennithera lugubris Inoue, 1986
- Pennithera manifesta Inoue, 1986
- Pennithera subalpina Inoue, 1986
- Pennithera subcomis (Inoue, 1978)
- Peratophyga venetia Swinhoe, 1902
- Peratostega deletaria (Moore, 1888)
- Percnia longitermen Prout, 1914
- Percnia luridaria Prout, 1914
- Percnia suffusa Wileman, 1914
- Perixera absconditaria (Walker, 1862)
- Perixera contrariata (Walker, 1861)
- Perixera decretaria (Walker, 1861)
- Perixera griseata (Warren, 1896)
- Perixera illepidaria (Guenée, [1858])
- Perixera insitiva (Prout, 1920)
- Perixera minorata Prout, 1938
- Perixera obrinaria (Guenée, [1858])
- Perixera sarawackaria (Guenee, 1857)
- Perizoma costata (Wileman, 1911)
- Perizoma fasciaria (Leech, 1897)
- Petrophora chlorosata (Scopoli, 1763)
- Phigalia owadai Nakajima, 1994
- Phoenissa brephos Inoue, 1970
- Photoscotosia atrostrigata (Bremer, 1864)
- Photoscotosia insularis Bastelberger, 1909
- Photoscotosia miniosata (Walker, 1862)
- Phthonandria atrilineata (Wileman, 1911)
- Phthonoloba fasciata (Moore 1888)
- Phthonoloba viridifasciata (Inoue, 1963)
- Physetobasis dentifascia Inoue, 1954
- Piercia viridiplana (Bastelberger, 1911)
- Piercia yui Inoue, 1970
- Pingasa alba Swinhoe, 1891
- Pingasa crenaria (Guenée, [1858])
- Pingasa ruginaria Inoue, 1964
- Pingasa secreta Inoue, 1986
- Plagodis reticulata Warren, 1893
- Platycerota vitticostata (Walker, [1863])
- Plesiomorpha flaviceps (Butler, 1881)
- Plesiomorpha punctilinearia (Leech, 1891)
- Pogonopygia nigralbata Warren, 1894
- Pogonopygia pavidus (Bastelberger, 1911)
- Pomasia denticlathrata Warren, 1893
- Postobeidia gravipardata Inoue
- Postobeidia horishana (Matsumura, 1931)
- Praobeidia gigantearia (Prout, 1914)
- Problepsis albidior Prout, 1938
- Problepsis conjunctiva Prout, 1917
- Problepsis crassinotata Prout, 1917
- Problepsis discophora Fixsen, 1887
- Problepsis shirozui Inoue, 1986
- Problepsis superans (Bulter, 1885)
- Prochasma dentilinea (Warren, 1893)
- Proteostrenia eumimeta Wehrli, 1936
- Protoboarmia amabilis Inoue, 1983
- Protonebula altera (Bastelberger, 1911)
- Protonebula egregia Inoue, 1986
- Pseudabraxas taiwana Inoue, 1986
- Pseudeuchromia maculifera Schultze, 1907
- Pseudocollix hyperythra Prout, 1941
- Pseudomiza argentilinea Wang, 1998
- Pseudomiza aurata Wileman, 1915
- Pseudomiza flavitincta (Wileman, 1915)
- Pseudomiza obliquaria (Leech, 1897)
- Psilalcis albibasis (Hampson, 1895)
- Psilalcis breta (Wileman, 1911)
- Psilalcis diorthogonia (Wehrli, 1925)
- Psilalcis fui Sato, 2002
- Psilalcis menoides (Wehrli, 1943)
- Psilalcis nigrifasciata (Wileman, 1912)
- Psilalcis pulveraria (Wileman, 1912)
- Psilalcis rotundata Inoue, 1998
- Psyra conferta Inoue, 1983
- Psyra cuneata Bastelberger, 1909
- Psyra spurcataria (Walker, [1863])
- Pylargosceles steganioides (Wileman, 1915)
- Racotis boarmiaria (Guenee, 1857)
- Ramobia anmashana Sato, 2002
- Rheumaptera albofasciata Inoue, 1986
- Rheumaptera marmoraria (Leech, 1897)
- Rheumaptera nengkaoensis Inoue, 1986
- Rhodostrophia bisinuata Prout, 1938
- Rikiosatoa fucataria (Wileman, 1911)
- Rikiosatoa mavi (Prout, 1915)
- Rikiosatoa transversa Inoue, 1998
- Ruttelerona pseudocessaria Holloway, 1993
- Ruttellerona pseudocessaria Holloway, 1993
- Sarcinodes carnearius Geuenee, 1857
- Sarcinodes mongaku Marumo, 1920
- Sarcinodes yayeyamanus Inoue, 1976
- Sarcinodes yeni Sommerer, 1996
- Satoblephara owadai (Inoue, 1978)
- Sauris angulosa (Warren 1896)
- Sauris angustifasciata (Inoue, 1976)
- Sauris inscissa (Prout, 1958)
- Sauris interruptata (Moore, 1888)
- Sauris marginepunctata (Warren, 1899)
- Scardamia metallaria Guenee, 1857
- Schistophyle falcifera Warren, 1896
- Scionomia praeditaria (Leech, 1897)
- Scionomia sinuosa (Wileman, 1910)
- Scopula actuaria (Walker, 1861)
- Scopula adeptaria (Walker, 1861)
- Scopula albilarvata (Warren, 1899)
- Scopula anatreces Prout, 1920
- Scopula attentata (Walker, 1861)
- Scopula caesaria (Walker, 1861)
- Scopula defectiscripta Prout, 1914
- Scopula emissaria (Walker, 1861)
- Scopula emma (West, 1930)
- Scopula formosana Prout, 1934
- Scopula ignobilis (Warren, 1901)
- Scopula impersonata (Walker, 1861)
- Scopula isomerica Prout, 1922
- Scopula kagiata (Bastelberger, 1909)
- Scopula limbata (Wileman, 1915)
- Scopula mecysma (Swinhoe, 1894)
- Scopula nesciaria (Walker, 1861)
- Scopula nigropunctata (Walker, 1862)
- Scopula personata (Prout, 1913)
- Scopula propinquaria (Leech, 1897)
- Scopula proximaria (Wileman, 1911)
- Scopula pulchellata Prout, 1938
- Scopula punctatissima (Bastelberger, 1911)
- Scopula rantaizanensis (Wileman, 1915)
- Scopula sauteri Prout, 1922
- Scopula sybillaria (Swinhoe, 1902)
- Scopula yamanei Inoue, 1978
- Seleniopsis evanescens (Bulter, 1881)
- Sibatania arizana (Wileman, 1911)
- Somatina plynusaria (Walker, 1862)
- Somatina rosacea Prout, 1914
- Spaniocentra hollowayi Inoue, 1985
- Spiralisigna subpumilata (Inoue, 1972)
- Syncosmia bicornuta Inoue, 2002
- Syncosmia patinata Warren, 1897
- Synegia esther Butler, 1881
- Synegia estherodes Sato, 1990
- Synegia eumeleata Walker, 1861
- Synegia limitata (Warren, 1897)
- Synegia masuii Sato, 1990
- Synegia pallens Sato, 1990
- Synegiodes histrionarius (Bastelberger, 1909)
- Tanaoctenia haliaria (Walker, 1861)
- Tanaorhinus formosanus Okana, 1959
- Tanaorhinus kina Inoue, 1978
- Tanaorhinus viridiluteatus (Walker, 1861)
- Tasta argozana Prout, 1926
- Telenomeuta punctimarginaria (Leech, 1891)
- Thalassodes intaminata Inoue, 1971
- Thalassodes opalina Bulter, 1880
- Thinopteryx crocoptera Swinhoe, 1916
- Thinopteryx nebulosa Bulter, 1883
- Timandra comptaria Walker, 1862
- Timandra convectaria Walker, 1861
- Timandra dichela (Prout, 1935)
- Timandra extremaria Walker, 1861
- Timandra synthaca (Prout, 1938)
- Timandromorpha discolor (Warren, 1896)
- Timandromorpha enervata Inoue, 1944
- Traminda aventiaria (Guenée, [1858])
- Trichoplites albimaculosa Inoue, 1978
- Trichoplites ingressa Prout, 1939
- Trichopterigia adorabilis Yazaki, 1987
- Trichopterigia kishidai Yazaki 1987
- Trichopterigia nivocellata (Bastelberger, 1911)
- Trichopterigia rubripuncta Wileman 1916
- Trichopterigia rufinotata (Butler, 1889)
- Trichopterigia sanguinipunctata (Warren 1893)
- Trichopterigia yoshimotoi Yazaki 1987
- Trichopteryx fastuosa Inoue, 1958
- Trichopteryx fui Yazaki, 2002
- Trichopteryx fusconotata Hashimoto, 1983
- Trichopteryx terranea (Bulter, 1878)
- Triphosa atrifascia Inoue, 2004
- Triphosa lugens Bastelberger, 1909
- Triphosa praesumtiosa Prout, 1941
- Triphosa rantaizanensis Wileman, 1916
- Triphosa rotundata Inoue, 2004
- Triphosa rubrifusa Bastelberger, 1909
- Triphosa umbraria (Leech, 1891)
- Tristeirometa decussata (Prout, 1958)
- Tristrophis rectifascia (Wileman, 1912)
- Trotocraspeda divaricata (Moore, 1888)
- Tyloptera bella (Inoue, 1966)
- Uliura infausta (Prout, 1958)
- Venusia lineata Wileman, 1916
- Vindusara moorei (Thierry-Mieg, 1899)
- Wilemania nitobei (Nitobe, 1907)
- Xandrames dholaria Moore, 1868
- Xandrames latiferaria Warren, 1894
- Xanthorhoe curcumata (Moore, 1888)
- Xanthorhoe cybele Prout, 1931
- Xanthorhoe mediofascia (Wileman, 1915)
- Xanthorhoe saturata (Guenee, 1857)
- Xanthorhoe taiwana (Wileman, 1914)
- Xenoplia trivialis (Yazaki, 1987)
- Xenortholitha corioidea (Bastelberger, 1911)
- Xenortholitha latifusata (Walker, 1862)
- Xerodes albonotaria (Inoue, 1971)
- Xerodes contiguaria (Leech, 1897)
- Xerodes crenulata (Wileman, 1915)
- Xerodes obscura (Warren, 1899)
- Xyloscia dentifera Inoue, 1986
- Yashmakia suffusa (Warren, 1893)
- Zanclopera calidata Warren, 1905
- Ziridava kanshireiensis Prout, 1958
- Zygophyxia relictata (Walker, 1866)
- Zythos avellanea (Prout, 1923)

== Glyphipterigidae ==
- Carmentina molybdotoma (Diakonoff & Arita, 1979)
- Carmentina perculta (Diakonoff, 1979)
- Carmentina taiwanensis Arita & Heppner, 1992
- Glyphipterix affinis Arita & Heppner, 1992
- Glyphipterix ametris Diakonoff, 1979
- Glyphipterix concoluta Arita & Heppner, 1992
- Glyphipterix ditiorana (Walker, 1863)
- Glyphipterix formosametron Arita & Heppner, 1992
- Glyphipterix formosensis Arita & Heppner, 1992
- Glyphipterix gemmula Diakonoff & Arita, 1976
- Glyphipterix grandis Arita & Heppner, 1992
- Glyphipterix issikii Arita & Heppner, 1992
- Glyphipterix lineovalvae Arita & Heppner, 1992
- Glyphipterix lunaris Arita & Heppner, 1992
- Glyphipterix maculata Arita & Heppner, 1992
- Glyphipterix marinae Arita & Heppner, 1992
- Glyphipterix miniata Arita & Heppner, 1992
- Glyphipterix nizonata Arita & Heppner, 1992
- Glyphipterix protoscleriae Arita & Heppner, 1992
- Glyphipterix pseudogamma Arita & Heppner, 1992
- Glyphipterix pseudomelania Arita & Heppner, 1992
- Glyphipterix pseudotaiwana Arita & Heppner, 1992
- Glyphipterix rekoae Arita & Heppner, 1992
- Glyphipterix taiwana Arita & Heppner, 1992
- Glyphipterix tenuis Arita & Heppner, 1992
- Glyphipterix tona Arita & Heppner, 1992
- Glyphipterix trigonodes Arita, 1979
- Glyphipterix virgata Arita & Heppner, 1992
- Lepidotarphius perornatella (Walker, 1864)

== Gracillariidae ==
- Acrocercops clisopa Meyrick, 1935
- Acrocercops irradians Meyrick, 1931
- Acrocercops isonoma Meyrick, 1916
- Acrocercops melanoplecta Meyrick, 1908
- Acrocercops transecta Meyrick, 1931
- Acrocercops unistriata Yuan, 1986
- Caloptilia chrysolampra (Meyrick, 1936)
- Caloptilia theivora (Walsingham, 1891)
- Caloptilia zachrysa (Meyrick, 1907)
- Calybites isograpta (Meyrick, 1928)
- Conopomorpha litchiella Bradley, 1986
- Conopomorpha sinensis Bradley, 1986
- Cuphodes scioplintha (Meyrick, 1934)
- Deoptilia heptadeta (Meyrick, 1936)
- Diphtheroptila scriptulata (Meyrick, 1916)
- Epicephala chalybacma Meyrick, 1908
- Epicephala venenata Meyrick, 1935
- Eteoryctis deversa (Meyrick, 1922)
- Gibbovalva quadrifasciata (Stainton, 1863)
- Melanocercops phractopa (Meyrick, 1918)
- Phodoryctis caerulea (Meyrick, 1912)
- Phodoryctis stephaniae Kumata & Kuroko, 1988
- Phyllocnistis citrella Stainton, 1856
- Phyllocnistis saligna (Zeller, 1839)
- Phyllocnistis selenopa Meyrick, 1915
- Phyllonorycter orientalis (Kumata, 1963)
- Phyllonorycter pulchra (Kumata, 1963)
- Phyllonorycter triarcha (Meyrick, 1908)
- Phyllonorycter triplacomis (Meyrick, 1936)
- Porphyrosela dorinda (Meyrick, 1912)
- Spulerina dissotoma (Meyrick, 1931)
- Systoloneura geometropis (Meyrick, 1936)
- Telamoptilia cathedraea (Meyrick, 1908)
- Telamoptilia hemistacta (Meyrick, 1918)
- Telamoptilia prosacta (Meyrick, 1918)

== Heliodinidae ==
- Epicroesa metallifera Meyrick, 1907

== Hepialidae ==
- Endoclita davidi (Poujade, 1886)
- Endoclita excrescens (Butler, 1877)
- Endoclita inouei Ueda, 1987
- Endoclita sinensis (Moore, 1877)
- Hepialiscus monticola Ueda, 1988
- Hepialiscus robinsoni Ueda, 1988
- Hepialiscus taiwanus Ueda, 1988
- Palpifer hopponis Matsumura, 1931
- Palpifer sexnotatus (Moore, 1879)
- Parathitarodes changi Ueda, 1999
- Thitarodes arizana (Matsumura, 1931)

== Hyblaeidae ==
- Hyblaea constellata Guenee, 1852
- Hyblaea firmamentum Guenee, 1852
- Hyblaea puera (Cramer, 1777)

== Immidae ==
- Alampla arcifraga (Meyrick, 1914)
- Alampla oalaeodes (Meyrick, 1914)
- Birthana taiwana Heppner, 1990
- Imma asaphoneura Meyrick, 1934
- Imma flavibasa Moore, 1887
- Imma lathidora Meyrick, 1914
- Imma mylias Meyrick, 1906
- Imma tricrocota Meyrick, 1935
- Moca auxobathra (Meyrick, 1906)
- Moca fungosa (Meyrick, 1914)

== Lasiocampidae ==
- Arguda horishana (Matsumura, 1927)
- Bharetta owadai Kishida, 1986
- Cosmotriche discitincta Wileman, 1914
- Dendrolimus arizanus (Wileman, 1910)
- Dendrolimus kikuchii Matsumura, 1927
- Dendrolimus punctatus (Walker, 1855)
- Dendrolimus taiwanus (Matsumura, 1932)
- Euthrix laeta (Walker, 1855)
- Euthrix nigropuncta (Wileman, 1910)
- Euthrix ochreipuncta (Wileman, 1910)
- Euthrix tamahonis (Matsumura, 1927)
- Gastropacha horishana Matsumura, 1927
- Gastropacha insularis Zolotuhin, 2005
- Gastropacha pardalis Tams, 1935
- Gastropacha xenapates Tams, 1935
- Kunugia brunnea (Wileman, 1915)
- Kunugia undans (Strand, 1915)
- Lebeda nobilis Walker, 1855
- Malacosoma neustria Matsumura, 1932
- Metanastria hyrtaca (Cramer, 1779)
- Odonestis formosae Wileman, 1910
- Odonestis pruni (Linnaeus, 1758)
- Pachypasoides albisparsus (Wileman, 1910)
- Paradoxopla sinuata (Wileman, 1915)
- Paralebeda plagifera (Walker, 1855)
- Pyrosis ni (Wang & Fan, 1995)
- Pyrosis wangi Zolotuhin & Witt, 2007
- Radhica flavovittata (Matsumura, 1932)
- Somadasys catocoides (Strand, 1915)
- Syrastrena sumatrana Kishida, 1985
- Syrastrenopsis kawabei Kishida, 1991
- Takanea excisa (Wileman, 1910)
- Trabala vishnou (Matsumura, 1909)

== Lecithoceridae ==
- Athymoris aurantiella Park, 2000b
- Athymoris liukueiensis Park, 2000b
- Athymoris martialis Meyrick, 1935
- Athymoris phreatosa Wu, 1994
- Athymoris subtrigona Park, 2000b
- Carodista cultrata Park, 2000
- Carodista fushanensis Park, 2000
- Carodista montana Park, 2000
- Carodista notolychna Meyrick, 1936
- Caveana senuri Park, 2013
- Deltoplastis commatopa Meyrick, 1932
- Deltoplastis lobigera Gozmany, 1978
- Deltoplastis ovatella Park, 2001
- Dinochares notolepis Park, 2000
- Epimactis talantias Meyrick, 1908
- Frisilia chinensis Gozmany, 1978
- Frisilia cornualis Park, 2008
- Frisilia homalistis Meyrick, 1935
- Halolaguna oncopterux Wu, 1994
- Halolaguna palinensis Park, 2000b
- Halolaguna sublaxata Gozmany, 1978
- Homaloxestis baibaraensis Park, 1999
- Homaloxestis cholopis Meyrick, 1906
- Homaloxestis hilaris Gozmany, 1978
- Homaloxestis myeloxesta Meyrick, 1932
- Issikiopteryx japonica Moriuti, 1973
- Issikiopteryx taipingensis Park, 2003
- Issikiopteryx zonophaera (Meyrick, 1935)
- Lecithocera altusana Park, 1999
- Lecithocera anguistiella Park, 1999
- Lecithocera atricastana Park, 1999
- Lecithocera aulias Meyrick, 1910
- Lecithocera bimaculata Park, 1999
- Lecithocera chartaca Wu & Liu, 1993
- Lecithocera dondavisi Park, 2013
- Lecithocera erecta Park, 1935
- Lecithocera fascicula Park, 1999
- Lecithocera fascinatrix Meyrick, 1935
- Lecithocera fuscosa Park, 1999
- Lecithocera glabrata Wu & Liu, 1992
- Lecithocera indigens Meyrick, 1914
- Lecithocera latiola Park, 1999
- Lecithocera megalopis Meyrick, 1916
- Lecithocera metacausta Meyrick, 1910
- Lecithocera palingensis Park, 1999
- Lecithocera paralevirota Park, 1999
- Lecithocera pelomorpha Meyrick, 1931
- Lecithocera pulchella Park, 1999
- Lecithocera rotundata Gozmany, 1978
- Lecithocera serena Gozmany, 1978
- Lecithocera shanpinensis Park, 1999
- Lecithocera thaiheisana Park, 1999
- Lecithocera theconoma Meyrick, 1926
- Lecithocera tienchiensis Park, 1999
- Lecitholaxa thiodora Meyrick, 1914
- Lysipatha diaxantha Meyrick, 1932
- Lysipatha zonosphaera Meyrick, 1932
- Nosphistica bisinuata Park, 2002
- Nosphistica fenestrata Gozmany, 1978
- Nosphistica fuscolepis Park, 2002
- Nosphistica paramecola Wu, 1996
- Nosphistica tarokoensis Park, 2002
- Philharmonia adusta Park, 2000b
- Spatulignatha idiogena Wu, 1994
- Spatulignatha olaxana Wu, 1994
- Synesarga bleszynskii Gozmany, 1978
- Synesarga caradjai Gozmany, 1978
- Thubana albisignis (Meyrick, 1914)
- Thubana deltaspis Meyrick, 1935
- Thubana spinula Park, 2001
- Tisis mesozosta Meyrick, 1914
- Torodora albicruris Park & Heppner, 2000
- Torodora capillaris Park & Heppner, 2000
- Torodora chinanensis Park, 2003
- Torodora galera Wu & Liu, 1994
- Torodora manoconta Wu & Liu, 1994
- Torodora octovara Meyrick, 1932
- Torodora ortilege (Meyrick, 1911)
- Torodora parthenopis Meyrick, 1932
- Torodora pseudogalera Park, 2004
- Torodora rectilinea Park, 2003
- Torodora sciadosa Wu & Liu, 1994

== Limacodidae ==
- Altha lacteola Strand, 1915
- Althonarosa horisyaensis Kawada, 1930
- Belippa horrida Walker, 1865
- Cania heppneri Inoue, 1992
- Ceratonema wilemani West, 1932
- Chalcoscelides castaneipars (Moore, 1866)
- Chibiraga banghaasi (Hering & Hopp, 1927)
- Dactylorhychides rufibasale (Hampson, 1896)
- Darna furva (Wileman, 1911)
- Darna pallivitta (Moore, 1877)
- Darna trima (Moore, 1860)
- Demonarosa rufotessellata (Moore, 1879)
  - Demonarosa rufotessellata subrosea (Wileman, 1915)
- Flavinarosa obscura (Wileman, 1911)
- Iraga rugosa (Wileman, 1911)
- Mahanta kawadai Yoshimoto, 1995
- Mahanta zolotuhini Solovyev, 2005
- Microleon lingipalpis Bulter, 1885
- Miresa fulgida Wileman, 1910
- Monema rubriceps (Matsumura, 1931)
- Nagodopsis shirakiana Matsumura, 1931
- Narosa corusca Wileman, 1911
- Narosa fulgens (Leech, 1889)
- Narosa nigrisigna Wileman, 1911
- Narosa nitobei Shiraki, 1913
- Narosoideus vulpinus (Wileman, 1911)
- Natada arizana (Wileman, 1916)
- Neiraga baibarana Matsumura, 1931
- Parasa bicolor (Matsumura, 1911)
- Parasa darma Moore, 1860
- Parasa hilarata (Staudinger, 1887)
- Parasa martini Solovyev, 2010
- Parasa pastoralis Bulter, 1880
- Parasa pygmy Solovyev, 2010
- Parasa shirakii Kawada, 1930
- Parasa tessellata Moore, 1877
- Parasa viridiflamma Wu & Chang, 2013
- Phlossa conjuncta (Walker, 1855)
- Phlossa melli (Hering, 1931)
- Phlossa taiwana (Wileman, 1916)
- Phrixolepia inouei Yoshimoto, 1993
- Rhamnopsis arizanella Matsumura, 1931
- Rhamnosa uniformis (Swinhoe, 1895)
- Scopelodes contractus Walker, 1855
- Setora baibarana (Matsumura, 1931)
- Setora sinensis Moore, 1877
- Sinensis formosana Wileman, 1911
- Spatulifimbria castaneiceps Hering, 1931
- Susica sinensis Wileman
- Thosea bicolor Shiraki, 1913
- Thosea cana (Walker, 1865)
- Thosea castanea Wileman, 1911
- Thosea conspersa (Bulter, 1880)
- Thosea postornata Hampson, 1900
- Thosea rufa Wileman, 1915
- Thosea sinensis (Walker, 1855)
- Trichogyia circulifera Hering, 1933

== Lymantriidae ==
- Arctornis cygna (Moore, 1879)
- Arctornis flavicostata (Matsumura, 1927)
- Arctornis formosensis (Strand, 1922)
- Arctornis jonasii (Butler, 1877)
- Arctornis kanazawai Inoue
- Arctornis l-nigrum Okano
- Arna bipunctapex (Hampson), 1891
- Aroa substrigosa Walker
- Calliteara angulata (Hampson, 1891)
- Calliteara arizana (Wileman, 1911)
- Calliteara baibarana (Matsumura, 1927)
- Calliteara contexta Kishida, 1998
- Calliteara grotei (Matsumura, 1927)
- Calliteara kikuchii (Matsumura, 1927)
- Calliteara lunulata (Matsumura, 1927)
- Calliteara multilineata (Swinhoe, 1917)
- Calliteara postfusca (Swinhoe, 1895)
- Calliteara saitonis (Matsumura, 1927)
- Calliteara taiwana (Wileman, 1910)
- Cifuna locuples Walker
- Dasychira suisharyonis Strand
- Dura alba Moore
- Euproctis alikangiae Strand, 1914
- Euproctis angulata Matsumura, 1927
- Euproctis aurata Wileman, 1911
- Euproctis baibarana Matsumura, 1927
- Euproctis bimaculata Matsumura, 1921
- Euproctis brachycera Collentte, 1938
- Euproctis centrofascia Matsumura, 1921
- Euproctis chibiana Matsumura, 1927
- Euproctis croceola Strand, 1918
- Euproctis dissimilis Wileman, 1910
- Euproctis endoplagia Hampson, 1897
- Euproctis hopponis (Matsumura, 1933)
- Euproctis inornata Wileman, 1910
- Euproctis insulata Wileman, 1910
- Euproctis kanshireia Wileman, 1910
- Euproctis karapina Strand, 1914
- Euproctis latifascia Strand, 1914
- Euproctis lubecula Wileman, 1910
- Euproctis macropleura (Strand, 1914)
- Euproctis magna Swinhoe, 1891
- Euproctis nigricauda Matsumura, 1931
- Euproctis nigropuncta Wileman, 1910
- Euproctis postalbata Matsumura, 1933
- Euproctis postfusca Wileman & South, 1917
- Euproctis pterofera Strand, 1914
- Euproctis pulverea (Leech, 1888)
- Euproctis purpureofasciata Wileman, 1914
- Euproctis sericea Wileman, 1910
- Euproctis shironis Matsumura, 1933
- Euproctis simplex Wileman, 1911
- Euproctis sparsa Wileman, 1910
- Euproctis staudingeri (Leech, 1889)
- Euproctis striata Wileman, 1910
- Euproctis taiwana (Shiraki, 1913)
- Euproctis tamahonis Matsumura, 1927
- Euproctis tomponis (Matsumura, 1929)
- Euproctis uchidai Matsumura, 1927
- Euproctis unifascia Wileman
- Euproctis unipunctapex Shiraki, 1913
- Euproctis urocoma (Strand, 1914)
- Euproctis usukia Matsumura, 1933
- Euproctis varians (Walker, 1855)
- Euproctis virguncula Walker, 1855
- Eurpoctis mimosa (Matsumura, 1933)
- Eurpoctis shirakii Matsumura
- Ilema kosemponica (Strand), 1914
- Ilema nachiensis (Marumo, 1917)
- Ilema nigrofascia (Wileman), 1911
- Ilema olivacea (Wileman), 1910
- Laelia exclamationis (Kollar, 1844)
- Laelia formosana Strand
- Laelia striata Wileman
- Leucoma clara (Walker, 1865)
- Leucoma niveata (Walker, 1865)
- Locharna strigipennis Moore
- Lymantria concolor Walker, 1855
- Lymantria grisea Strand, 1914
- Lymantria iris Strand, 1911
- Lymantria mathura Butler, 1877
- Lymantria sinica Moore, 1879
- Lymantria sugii Kishida, 1986
- Lymantria umbrifera Wileman, 1910
- Lymantria xylina Swinhoe, 1903
- Medama diplaga (Hampson, 1910)
- Numenes patrana Moore
- Numenes takamukui Matsumura
- Olene dudgeoni (Swinhoe), 1907
- Olene inclusa (Walker), 1856
- Olene mendosa (Hübner), 1823
- Orgyia nantonis Matsumura
- Orgyia postica (Walker, 1855)
- Pantana ochripalpis (Strand, 1914)
- Pantana pluto (Leech, 1890)
- Pantana seriatopunctata Matsumura
- Pantana visum Walker
- Perina nuda (Fabricius, 1787)
- Pida decolorata Matsumura
- Pida postalba Wileman
- Psalis ennatula (Fabricius, 1793)
- Somena scintillans (Walker, 1856)

== Lyonetiidae ==
- Lyonetia anthemopa Meyrick, 1936
- Lyonetia clerkella (Linnaeus, 1758)

== Macropiratidae ==
- Agdistopis sinhala (T. B. Fletcher, 1909)

== Micropterigidae ==
- Palaeomicroides anmashanensis Hashimoto
- Palaeomicroides aritai Hashimoto
- Palaeomicroides caeruleimaculella Issiki
- Palaeomicroides costipunctella Issiki
- Palaeomicroides discopurpurella Issiki
- Palaeomicroides fasciatella Issiki
- Palaeomicroides marginella Issiki
- Palaeomicroides obscurella Issiki
- Paramartyria bimaculella Issiki
- Paramartyria maculatella Issiki
- Paramartyria ovalella Issiki

== Momphidae ==
- Mompha lychnopis Meyrick, 1933

== Neopseustidae ==
- Neopseustis meyricki Hering, 1925

== Noctuidae ==
- Abrostola abrostolina (Butler, 1879)
- Abrostola anophioides Moore, 1882
- Abrostola suisharyonis Strand, 1920
- Acantholipes larentioides Strand, 1920
- Acantholipes trajectus (Walker, 1865)
- Achaea janata (Linnaeus, 1758)
- Achaea serva (Fabricius, 1775)
- Acidon nigrobasis (Swinhoe, 1905)
- Acontia bicolora Leech, 1889
- Acontia crocata Guenee, 1852
- Acontia marmoralis (Fabricius, 1794)
- Acontia olivacea (Hampson, 1891)
- Acronicta albistigma Hampson, 1909
- Acronicta denticulata B.S.Chang, 1991
- Acronicta digna (Butler, 1881)
- Acronicta gigasa Chang, 1991
- Acronicta hercules (Felder & Rogenhofer, 1874)
- Acronicta intermedia (Warren, 1909)
- Acronicta pruinosa (Guenee, 1852)
- Actinotia intermediata (Bremer, 1861)
- Acygnatha terminalis (Wileman, 1915)
- Adisura atkinsoni Moore, 1881
- Adrapsa ablualis Walker, 1859
- Adrapsa mediana Wileman, 1915
- Adrapsa notigera (Butler, 1879)
- Adrapsa ochracea Leech, 1900
- Adrapsa quadrilinealis (Wileman, 1914)
- Adrapsa rivulata Leech, 1990
- Adrapsa simplex (Butler, 1879)
- Adrapsa subnotigera Owada, 1982
- Aedia acronyctoides (Guenee, 1852)
- Aedia flavescens (Butler, 1889)
- Aedia leucomelas (Linnaeus, 1758)
- Aedia obscura Wileman, 1914
- Agrochola albirena (Chang, 1991)
- Agrotis ipsilon (Hufnagel, 1766)
- Agrotis segetum (Denis & Schiffermüller, 1775)
- Agrotis taiwana B.S.Chang, 1991
- Albocosta triangularis (Moore, 1867)
- Aletia brunneicoccinea Calora, 1966
- Aletia consanguis (Guenee, 1852)
- Aletia fasciata (Moore, 1881)
- Aletia ignita (Hampson, 1905)
- Aletia limbopuncta (Strand, 1920)
- Aletia longipinna B.S.Chang, 1991
- Aletia mediana (Moore, 1881)
- Aletia subplacida Sugi, 1977
- Alloasteropetes olivacea Kishida & Machijima, 1994
- Alloasteropetes paradisea Kishida & Owada, 2003
- Allophyes miaoli Hreblay & Ronkay, 1997
- Amphipyra acheron Draudt, 1950
- Amphipyra averna Hreblay & Ronkay, 1997
- Amphipyra deletaiwana Hreblay & Ronkay, 1998
- Amphipyra formosana Hacker & Ronkay, 1998
- Amphipyra fuscosa Chang, 1991
- Amphipyra monolitha Felder & Rogenhofer, 1874
- Amphipyra schrenckii Ménétriès, 1859
- Amphipyra shryshana Chang, 1991
- Amyna frontalis Strand, 1920
- Amyna natalis (Walker, 1859)
- Amyna octo (Guenee, 1852)
- Amyna punctum (Fabricius, 1794)
- Amyna stellata Bulter, 1878
- Anachrostis indistincta Wileman & South, 1917
- Anachrostis marginata Wileman & South, 1917
- Anadevidia peponis (Fabricius, 1775)
- Ananepa doda (Swinhoe, 1902)
- Anaplectoides fuscivirens Sugi, 1995
- Anaplectoides inouei Plante, 1987
- Anaplectoides semivirens Ronkay & Ronkay, 1999
- Anigraea rubida Walker, 1862
- Anisoneura aluco (Fabricius, 1775)
- Anisoneura salebrosa Guenee, 1852
- Anodontodes rotunda Hampson, 1895
- Anomis flava (Fabricius, 1775)
- Anomis fulvida Guenee, 1852
- Anomis involuta Walker, 1858
- Anomis lyona (Swinhoe, 1919)
- Anomis macronephra Holloway, 1982
- Anomis mesogona (Walker, 1858)
- Anomis nigritarsis (Walker, 1858)
- Anomis privata (Walker, 1865)
- Anoratha sinuosa Wileman, 1916
- Anorthoa changi Ronkay & Ronkay, 2001
- Anorthoa fabiani (Hrebley & Ronkay, 1998)
- Anorthoa munda (Hreblay & Ronkay, 1998)
- Antha grata (Butler, 1881)
- Anticarsia irrorata (Fabricius, 1781)
- Antivaleria viridentata Hreblay & Ronkay, 1997
- Antoculeora yashimotoi Runkay, 1997
- Anuga lunulata Moore, 1867
- Anuga plicatrix Sugi, 1992
- Apamea aquila Hreblay & Ronkay, 1997
- Apamea fasciata (Leech, 1900)
- Apamea lieni Hreblay, 1998
- Apamea magnirena (Boursin, 1943)
- Apamea rufus (B.S.Chang, 1911)
- Apamea sodalis (Butler, 1878)
- Apamea taiwana (Wileman, 1914)
- Apospasta rantaizanensis (Wileman, 1915)
- Apsarasa radians (Westwood, 1848)
- Arasada kanshireiensis Wileman, 1916
- Arcte coerula (Guenee, 1852)
- Argyrogramma signata (Fabricius, 1792)
- Artena dotata (Fabricius, 1794)
- Asidemia albovitta Hreblay & Ronkay, 2000
- Asota caricae (Fabricius, 1775)
- Asota egens Jordan, 1897
- Asota ficus (Fabricius, 1775)
- Asota heliconia (Butler, 1877)
- Asota plana (Butler, 1881)
- Asota tortuosa (Moore, 1872)
- Atacira affinis (Hampson, 1918)
- Atacira lyncestides (Strand, 1920)
- Athetis bremusa (Swinhoe)
- Athetis confusa Wileman, 1915
- Athetis hoengshana Han & Kononenko, 2011
- Athetis lineosa (Moore, 1881)
- Athetis placida (Moore, 1884)
- Athetis speideli Kononenko, 2005
- Athetis stellata (Moore, 1882)
- Athetis stellulata B.S.Chang, 1911
- Athetis taiwanensis Kononenko, 2005
- Athetis theobroma (Hreblay & Ronkay, 1997)
- Atrachea ochrotica (Hampson, 1910)
- Atrachea viridinigra (Hreblay & Ronkay, 1997)
- Attonda adspersa (Felder & Rogenhofer, 1874)
- Auchmis inextricata (Moore, 1881)
- Autoba tristalis (Leech, 1889)
- Avatha bipartita (Wileman, 1915)
- Avatha chinensis (Warren, 1913)
- Avatha discolor (Fabricius, 1794)
- Avitta fasciosa Moore, 1882
- Avitta puncta Wileman, 1911
- Avitta taiwana Wileman, 1915
- Axylia putris (Linnaeus, 1761)
- Bagada poliomera (Hampson, 1908)
- Bastilla vitiensis Butler, 1886
- Batracharta divisa Wileman, 1914
- Bertula abjudicalis Walker, 1859
- Bertula albipunctata Wileman, 1915
- Bertula alpheusalis (Walker, [1859] 1858)
- Bertula bidentata (Wileman, 1915)
- Bertula bisectalis (Wileman, 1915)
- Bertula centralis (Wileman, 1915)
- Bertula hadenalis (Wileman, 1915)
- Bertula incisa (Wileman, 1915)
- Bertula kosemponica (Strand, 1917)
- Bertula parallela (Leech, 1900)
- Bertula quadripuncta (Wileman, 1915)
- Bertula terminalis (Wileman, 1915)
- Bertula venata (Leech, 1900)
- Blasticorhinus bifasciata (Wileman, 1914)
- Blasticorhinus enervis (Swinhoe, 1890)
- Blasticorhinus kanshireiensis (Wileman, 1914)
- Blasticorhinus rivulosa (Walker, 1865)
- Blepharita alpestris B.S.Chang, 1991
- Blepharita flavistigma (Moore, 1867)
- Bocana manifestalis Walker, 1859
- Bocula caradrinoides Guenee, 1852
- Bocula diddisa (Swinhoe, 1890)
- Bocula marginata Moore, 1882
- Borsippa diffisa (Swinhoe, 1890)
- Borsippa marginata Moore, 1882
- Borsippa xanthostola (Hampson, 1926)
- Brevipecten consanguis Leech, 1900
- Britha biguttata Walker, 1866
- Britha bilineata (Wileman, 1915)
- Bryomoia melachlora (Staudinger, 1892)
- Bryophila granitalis (Butler, 1881)
- Bryophilina mollicula (Graeser, 1889)
- Calesia dasypterus (Kollar, 1844)
- Callopistria aethiops Bulter, 1878
- Callopistria clava (Leech, 1900)
- Callopistria deflexusa Chang, 1991
- Callopistria delicata Chang, 1991
- Callopistria duplicans Walker, 1858
- Callopistria guttulalis Hampson, 1896
- Callopistria japonibia Inoue & Sugi, 1958
- Callopistria juventina (Stoll, 1782)
- Callopistria maillardi (Guenée, 1862)
- Callopistria nigrescens (Wileman, 1915)
- Callopistria nobilior Eda, 2000
- Callopistria phaeogona (Hampson, 1908)
- Callopistria placodoides (Guenee, 1852)
- Callopistria pulchrilinea (Walker, 1862)
- Callopistria repleta Walker, 1858
- Callopistria rivularis Walker, [1858] 1857
- Callopistria thalpophiloides (Walker, 1862)
- Callyna contracta Warren, 1913
- Callyna jugaria Walker, 1858
- Callyna monoleuca Walker, 1858
- Callyna semivitta Moore, 1882
- Calyptra fletcheri (Berio, 1955)
- Calyptra minuticornis (Guenee, 1852)
- Calyptra orthograpta (Butler, 1886)
- Capnodes nigerrimasigna Strand, 1920
- Carmara subcervina Walker, 1863
- Catada pyralistis Strand, 1919
- Catocala armandi Sugi, 1982
- Catocala columbina Sugi, 1965
- Catocala formosana Okano, 1958
- Catocala intacta Sugi, 1965
- Catocala kuangtungensis Mell, 1931
- Catocala naganoi Sugi, 1982
- Catocala nivea Owada, 1986
- Catocala nupta (Linnaeus, 1767)
- Catocala pataloides Mell, 1931
- Catocala praegnax Kishida, 1981
- Catocala tokui Sugi, 1976
- Catocala wushensis Okano, 1964
- Cerastis griseiorbis Hreblay & Ronkay, 1997
- Cerynea igniaria (Hampson, 1898)
- Chalciope mygdon (Cramer, 1777)
- Chandata aglaja (Kishida & Yoshimoto, 1978)
- Chandata taiwana Yoshimoto, 1982
- Chasmina candida (Walker, 1865)
- Chasmina nigripunctata (Bthune-Baker, 1908)
- Chasminodes cilia (Staudinger, 1888)
- Checupa stegeri Hreblay & Thöny, 1995
- Chelonomorpha japana (Miyake, 1907)
- Chlumetia transversa (Walker, 1865)
- Chortodes cornutifera Hreblay & Ronkay, 1997
- Chrysodeixis acuta (Walker, 1858)
- Chrysodeixis eriosoma (Doubleday, 1843)
- Chrysodeixis heberachis (Strand, 1920)
- Chrysodeixis minutus Dufay, 1970
- Chrysodeixis taiwani (Dufay, 1974)
- Chusaris angulata Wileman, 1915
- Chusaris compripalpis Strand, 1920
- Chusaris dubiosa Strand, 1919
- Chusaris microlepidopterana (Strand, 1920)
- Chusaris nigromaculata (Wileman, 1915)
- Chusaris sordida (Wileman & South, 1917)
- Chytonix albiplaga Hampson, 1914
- Chytonix costimacula Wileman, 1915
- Chytonix umbrifera (Butler, 1889)
- Chytonix variegata Wileman, 1914
- Cidariplura bilineata (Wileman & South, 1919)
- Cidariplura gladiata Butler, 1879
- Cidariplura nigrisigna (Wileman, 1915)
- Cidariplura signata Butler
- Clavipalpula aurariae Ronkay, Ronkay, Gyulai & Hacker, 2010
- Condate purpurea (Hampson, 1902)
- Condica albigutta (Wileman, 1912)
- Condica dolorosa (Walker, 1866)
- Condica illecta (Walker, 1865)
- Condica serva (Walker, 1858)
- Conistra anonyma Hreblay & Ronkay, 1998
- Conistra takasago Kishida & Yoshimoto, 1979
- Conservula indica (Moore, 1867)
- Corgatha tornalis Wileman, 1915
- Cosmia achatina Bulter, 1879
- Cosmia cara Bulter, 1881
- Cosmia hanrongtzuooi Ronkay & Ronkay, 1999
- Cosmia limacodina Sugi, 1997
- Cosmia moderata (Staudinger, 1888)
- Cosmia poecila Hreblay & Ronkay, 1997
- Cosmia restituta Walker, 1857
- Cosmia unicolor (Staudinger, 1892)
- Craniophora fasciata (Moore, 1884)
- Craniophora harmandi (Poujade, 1898)
- Craniophora oda (Lattin, 1949)
- Cretonia vegeta (Swinhoe, 1885)
- Cruriopsis funebris Jordan, 1912
- Cruxoruza decorata (Swinhoe, 1903)
- Cryphia basichlora Kononenko, 1998
- Cryphia granitalis (Butler, 1881)
- Cryphia herczigi Hreblay & Ronkay, 2000
- Cryphia hohuana Hreblay & Ronkay, 2000
- Ctenoplusia adiaphora (Dufay, 1974)
- Ctenoplusia agnata (Staudinger, 1892)
- Ctenoplusia mutans (Walker, 1865)
- Ctenoplusia albostriata (Bremer & Grey, 1852)
- Ctenoplusia furcifera (Walker, 1857)
- Ctenoplusia kosemponensis (Strand, 1920)
- Ctenoplusia limbirena (Guenée, 1852)
- Ctenoplusia placida (Moore, 1884)
- Ctenoplusia sumbawana Behounek & Ronkay, 1999
- Cucullia juntaichaoi Ronkay & Ronkay, 1999
- Cyclodes omma (Hoeven, 1840)
- Cymatophoropsis formosana (Matsumura, 1927)
- Dactyloplusia impulsa (Walker, 1865)
- Daddala lucilla (Butler, 1881)
- Daseochaeta autumnalis Chang, 1991
- Diarsia arenosoides Poole, 1989
- Diarsia canescens (Butler, 1878)
- Diarsia carnipennis B.S.Chang, 1991
- Diarsia cia (Strand, 1919)
- Diarsia formosana Boursin, 1948
- Diarsia formosensis (Hampson, 1914)
- Diarsia macrodactyla Boursin, 1954
- Diarsia nigrafasciata B.S.Chang, 1991
- Diarsia nigrosigna (Moore, 1881)
- Diarsia sinuosa (Wileman, 1912)
- Diarsia subtincta Chang, 1991
- Diarsia taidactyla Varga & Ronkay, 2007
- Diarsia unica Plante, 1994
- Diarsia yoshimotoi Plante, 1994
- Dictyestra dissecta (Walker, 1865)
- Dierna duplicata Sugi, 1992
- Dinumma deponens Walker, 1858
- Dinumma placens Walker, 1858
- Diomea discoinsigna (Strand, 1920)
- Diomea insulana Yoshimoto, 2001
- Diomea jankowskii (Oberthur, 1880)
- Diomea stellata Wileman, 1916
- Diomea suvarnadivpae (Kobes, 1983)
- Diphtherocome pulchra (Wileman, 1912)
- Dipterygina cupreotincta Sugi, 1954
- Dipterygina indica (Moore, 1867)
- Donda siitanae (Remm, 1983)
- Dryobotodes caerulescens Ronkay & Ronkay, 2001
- Dryobotodes formosanus Hreblay & Ronkay, 1997
- Dunira diplogramma (Hampson, 1912)
- Dypterygia subfusca (Wileman, 1912)
- Dysgonia absentimacula (Guenee, 1852)
- Dysgonia acuta (Moore, 1883)
- Dysgonia amygdalis Moore, 1887
- Dysgonia analis (Guenee, 1852)
- Dysgonia arctotaenia (Guenee, 1852)
- Dysgonia arcuata (Moore, 1887)
- Dysgonia dulcis (Butler, 1878)
- Dysgonia fulvotaenia (Guenee, 1852)
- Dysgonia illibata (Fabricius, 1775)
- Dysgonia joviana (Stoll, 1782)
- Dysgonia maturata (Walker, 1858)
- Dysgonia onelia (Guenee, 1852)
- Dysgonia palumba (Guenee, 1852)
- Dysgonia praetermissa (Warren, 1913)
- Dysgonia rigidistria (Guenee, 1852)
- Dysgonia simillima (Guenee, 1852)
- Dysgonia stuposa (Fabricius, 1794)
- Eclipsea subapicalis (Swinhoe, 1905)
- Ecpatia longinquuva (Swinhoe, 1890)
- Ectogoniella pangraptalis Strand, 1920
- Edessena gentiusalis Walker, 1859
- Egira acronyctoides (Wileman, 1914)
- Egiropolia kingmana Ronkay & Ronkay, 2001
- Egnasia nagadeboides Strand, 1920
- Elusa ustula Hampson, 1909
- Elwesia sugii Hreblay & Ronkay, 1998
- Enispa bilineata Wileman, 1916
- Enispa terminipuncta (Wileman, 1916)
- Entomogramma fautrix Guenee, 1852
- Episparis taiwana Wileman & West, 1929
- Episteme adulatrix (Sonan, 1941)
- Episteme beatrix Matsumura, 1910
- Episteme lectrix (Mell, 1938)
- Ercheia cyllaria (Cramer, 1779)
- Ercheia niveostrigata Warren, 1913
- Ercheia umbrosa Bulter, 1881
- Erebus albicincta (Wileman, 1923)
- Erebus caprimulgus (Fabricius, 1781)
- Erebus ephesperis (Hübner, 1823)
- Erebus gemmans (Guenee, 1852)
- Erebus macrops (Linnaeus, 1768)
- Erebus pilosa (Leech, 1900)
- Ericeia eriophora (Guenee, 1852)
- Ericeia inangulata (Guenee, 1852)
- Ericeia pertendens (Walker, 1858)
- Ericeia subcinerea (Snellen, 1880)
- Erygia apicalis Guenee, 1852
- Erythroplusia pyropia (Butler, 1879)
- Estagrotis tibori Hreblay & Ronkay, 1997
- Eublemma anachoresis (Wallengren, 1863)
- Eublemma baccalix (Swinhoe, 1896)
- Eublemma cochylioides (Guenee, 1852)
- Eublemma conspersa (Butler, 1880)
- Eublemma dimidialis (Fabricius, 1794)
- Eublemma quadrapex (Hampson, 1891)
- Eublemma ragusana (Freyer, 1845)
- Eublemma rivula (Moore, 1882)
- Eublemma terminimaculata Wileman, 1915
- Eudocima homaena (Hübner, 1823)
- Eudocima okurai (Okano, 1964)
- Eudocima phalonia (Linnaeus, 1763)
- Eudocima salaminia (Cramer, 1777)
- Eudocima tyrannus (Guenée, 1852)
- Eugraptoblemma pictalis (Hampson, 1898)
- Euplexia albirena Wileman, 1914
- Euplexia amblypennis Strand, 1920
- Euplexia chlorerythra Swinhoe, 1895
- Euplexia lucipara (Linnaeus, 1758)
- Euplexidia angusta Yoshimoto, 1987
- Euplexidia exotica Yoshimoto, 1987
- Euplexidia pallidivirens Yoshimoto, 1987
- Euplocia membliaria (Cramer, 1780)
- Eupsilia baoshinchangi Fu, Tzuoo & Owada, 2008
- Eupsilia confusa Owada & Kobayashi, 1993
- Eupsilia contracta (Butler, 1878)
- Eupsilia shyu Chang, 1991
- Eupsilia strigifera Bulter, 1879
- Eupsilia tripunctata Butler, 1878
- Eupsilia virescens Yoshimoto, 1985
- Euromoia subpulchra (Alphéraky, 1897)
- Eutelia adulatricoides (Mell, 1943)
- Eutelia geyeri (Felder & Rogenhofer, 1874)
- Eutelia hamulatrix Draudt, 1950
- Eutrogia morosa (Moore, 1882)
- Euwilemania angulata (Wileman, 1911)
- Exsula dentatrix Miyake, 1907
- Extremoplusia megaloba (Hampson, 1912)
- Fabiania pulla Hreblay & Ronkay, 2000
- Feliniopsis asahinai (Sugi, 1982)
- Feliniopsis indistans (Guenee, 1852)
- Feliniopsis tripunctata (Chang, 1991)
- Fodina contigua Wileman, 1914
- Gerbathodes paupera (Staudinger, 1892)
- Gesonia obeditalis Walker, 1859
- Gigatelorta herois (Kobayashi, 2003)
- Goniocraspedon mistura (Swinhoe, 1891)
- Goniocraspidum pryeri (Leech, 1889)
- Gonoglasa contigua (Wileman, 1915)
- Gortyna flavina Hreblay & Ronkay, 1997
- Gortyna plumibitincta Hreblay & Ronkay, 1997
- Grammodes geometrica (Fabricius, 1775)
- Hadennia hisbonalis (Walker, [1859] 1858)
- Hadennia hypenalis (Walker, [1859] 1858)
- Hadennia mysalis (Walker, 1859)
- Hadennia nakatanii Owada, 1979
- Hadjina chinensis (Wallengren, 1865)
- Hamodes pendleburyi Prout, 1932
- Hamodes propitia (Boisduval, 1832)
- Heliothis armigera (Hübner, 1808)
- Heliothis assulta Guenee, 1852
- Hemictenophora euplexiodes Ronkay & Ronkay, 1999
- Hemiglaea albolineata Owada, 1993
- Hemiglaea costalis (Butler, 1879)
- Hemiglaea eupompa Ronkay & Ronkay, 1999
- Hemiglaea radiata Hreblay & Ronkay, 2000
- Hemiglaea horei horei Owada, 1993
- Hepatica indentalis (Wileman, 1915)
- Hepatica irrorata (Wileman & South, 1917)
- Herminia grisealis (Denis & Schiffermüller, 1775)
- Herminia kurokoi (Owada, 1987)
- Herminia vermiculata (Leech, 1900)
- Hermonassa formontana Hreblay & Ronkay, 1997
- Hermonassa hemicyclia Plante, 1994
- Hermonassa inconstans Wileman, 1912
- Hermonassa legraini Plante, 1994
- Hermonassa planeti Hreblay & Ronkay, 1997
- Himalistra soluta Hreblay & Ronkay, 1997
- Hipoepa biasalis (Walker, 1859)
- Hipoepa fractalis (Guenee, 1854)
- Holocryptis nymphula (Rebel, 1909)
- Hoplodrina implacata (Wileman & South, 1929)
- Houlberthosia ornatissma (Wileman, 1911)
- Hulodes caranea (Cramer, 1780)
- Hyalobole changae Owada, 1994
- Hyalobole kononenkoi Hreblay & Ronkay, 1997
- Hydrillodes gravatalis (Walker, 1859)
- Hydrillodes hemusalis (Walker, 1859)
- Hydrillodes lentalis Guenee, 1854
- Hydrillodes pseudomorosa Strand, 1920
- Hydrillodes wilemani Owada 1992
- Hypena albopunctalis (Leech, 1889)
- Hypena amica (Bulter, 1878)
- Hypena angustalis (Warren, 1913)
- Hypena assimilis Hampson, 1891
- Hypena conscitalis Walker, 1866
- Hypena cruca (Strand, 1920)
- Hypena depalpis Strand, 1920
- Hypena desquamata (Strand, 1920)
- Hypena dichromialis Strand, 1920
- Hypena furva Wileman, 1911
- Hypena iconicalis Walker, 1859
- Hypena indicatalis Walker, 1859
- Hypena indistincta Wileman, 1915
- Hypena kanshireiensis Wileman, 1916
- Hypena lignealis Walker, 1866
- Hypena napa Strand, 1920
- Hypena napana Strand, 1920
- Hypena occata Hampson, 1882
- Hypena parva (Wileman, 1916)
- Hypena perspicua (Leech, 1900)
- Hypena pmpeterseni Strand, 1920
- Hypena poa Strand, 1920
- Hypena sagitta (Fabricius, 1775)
- Hypena satsumalis Leech, 1889
- Hypena sinuosa Wileman, 1911
- Hypena strigatus (Fabricius, 1798)
- Hypena subcyanea Butler, 1881
- Hypena taiwana (Wileman, 1915)
- Hypena tenebralis (Strand, 1920)
- Hypena trigonalis (Guenee, 1854)
- Hypena zillana Strand, 1920
- Hypenagonia angulata Wileman, 1915
- Hypenagonia bipuncta Wileman, 1915
- Hypenagonia mediifascia Wileman & South, 1917
- Hypenagonia minor Wileman, 1915
- Hypenagonia obliquifascia Wileman & South, 1917
- Hypenagonia subsffusata Wileman & West, 1930
- Hypenagonia vexatariola (Strand, 1920)
- Hypercodia rubritincta Wileman & South, 1916
- Hyperlophoides compactilis (Swinhoe, 1890)
- Hyperstrotia flavipuncta (Leech, 1889)
- Hyperstrotia ochreipuncta (Wileman, 1914)
- Hypersypnoides formosensis (Hampson, 1926)
- Hypersypnoides moltrechti Berio, 1958
- Hypersypnoides punctosa (Walker, 1865)
- Hypersypnoides quadrinotata (Leech, 1900)
- Hypersypnoides submarginata (Walker, 1865)
- Hypersypnoides umbrosa (Butler, 1881)
- Hypocala deflorata (Fabricius, 1794)
- Hypocala rostrata (Fabricius, 1794)
- Hypocala subsatura Guenee, 1852
- Hypocala violacea Bulter, 1879
- Hypopyra ossigera Guenee, 1852
- Hypopyra pudens Walker, 1858
- Hypopyra vespertilio (Fabricius, 1787)
- Hyposada assimilis Warren, 1914
- Hyposada fasciosa (Moore, 1888)
- Hyposemansis albipunctata (Wileman, 1914)
- Hyposemansis singha Guenee, 1852
- Hypospila bolinoides Guenee, 1852
- Hypospila creberrima (Walker, 1858)
- Idia fulvipicta (Butler, 1889)
- Idia satyrata (Strand, 1920)
- Ipimorpha guanyuana B.S.Chang, 1991
- Ischyja ferrifracta (Walker, 1864)
- Isoura fuscicollis (Butler, 1889)
- Itmaharela basalis (Moore, 1882)
- Karana gemmifera (Walker, 1858)
- Karana hoenei Hreblay & Ronkay, 2000
- Koyaga virescens (Sugi, 1958)
- Koyaga viriditincta (Wileman, 1915)
- Lacera procellosa Bulter, 1879
- Laspyria ruficeps (Walker, 1864)
- Latirostrum bisacutum Hampson, 1895
- Leiostola tortricodia (Strand, 1920)
- Leucania percussa Bulter, 1880
- Leucania roseilinea Walker, 1862
- Leucania substriata Yoshimatsu, 1987
- Leucapamea chienmingfui Ronkay & Ronkay, 1999
- Leucapamea formosensis (Hampson, 1910)
- Leucapamea tsueyluana Chang, 1991
- Leucocosmia thoracica (Moore, 1884)
- Lithophane trimorpha Hreblay & Ronkay, 1997
- Lithophane venusta Yoshimoto, 1988
- Lithopolia confusa (Wileman, 1914)
- Lophomilia polybapta (Butler, 1879)
- Lophonycta neoconfusa Chang, 1991
- Lophoptera hemithyris (Hampson, 1905)
- Lophoptera illucida (Walker, 1865)
- Lophoptera longipennis (Moore, 1882)
- Lophoptera nama (Swinhoe, 1900)
- Lophoptera squammigera Guenee, 1852
- Lophoptera vittigera Walker, 1865
- Lophoruza albicostalis (Leech, 1889)
- Lophoruza lunifera (Moore, 1885)
- Loxioda similis (Moore, 1882)
- Luceria fletcheri Inoue, 1958
- Luceria oculalis (Moore, 1877)
- Lygephila kishidai Kinoshita, 1989
- Lygephila yoshimotoi Kinoshita, 1989
- Lygniodes hypoleuca Guenee, 1852
- Macdunnoughia tetragona (Walker, 1857)
- Maikona jezoensis Kishida, 1987
- Maliattha arefacta (Butler, 1879)
- Maliattha picata Bulter, 1889
- Maliattha picatina (Prout, 1932)
- Maliattha separata Walker, 1863
- Maliattha signifera (Walker, 1857)
- Maliattha vialis (Moore, 1882)
- Maliattha volodia Ronkay & Sohn, 2004
- Mamestra brassicae (Linnaeus, 1758)
- Mamestra tayulingensis Yoshimoto, 1989
- Mataeomera biangulata (Wileman, 1915)
- Maxera arizanensis (Wileman, 1914)
- Mecodina albodentata (Swinhoe, 1895)
- Mecodina cineracea (Butler, 1879)
- Mecodina inconspicua (Wileman & South, 1916)
- Mecodina karapinensis Strand, 1920
- Mecodina subcostalis (Walker, 1865)
- Megaloctena mandarina (Leech, 1900)
- Meganephra cinerea Kobayashi & Owada, 1996
- Meganephra crassa Kobayashi & Owada, 1996
- Meganephra debilis Kobayashi & Owada, 1996
- Meganephra funesta (Leech, 1889)
- Meganephra laxa Kobayashi & Owada, 1996
- Meganephra weixleri Hreblay & Ronkay, 1997
- Mesocrapex punkikonis Matsumura, 1929
- Mesorhynchaglaea tarokoensis Sugi, 1990
- Metaemene atrigutta (Leech, 1889)
- Metaemene hampsoni Wileman, 1914
- Metaphoenia incongrualis (Walker, 1859)
- Metaphoenia plagifera (Walker, 1864)
- Metopta rectifasciata (Menetries, 1863)
- Micreremites siculipalpis (Strand, 1920)
- Microxyla confusa (Wileman, 1911)
- Mimeusemia vilemani Hampson, 1911
- Mixomelia rivulosa (Wileman, 1915)
- Mniotype aulombardi Plante, 1994
- Mocis annetta (Butler, 1878)
- Mocis dolosa (Butler, 1881)
- Mocis frugalis (Fabricius, 1775)
- Mocis undata (Fabricius, 1775)
- Moma abbreviata (Sugi, 1968)
- Moma murrhina Graeser, 1889
- Mosopia punctilinea (Wileman, 1915)
- Mythimna loreyi (Duponchel, 1827)
- Mythimna martoni Yoshimatsu & Legrain, 2001
- Mythimna argentata Hreblay & Yoshimatsu, 1998
- Mythimna bistrigata (Moore, 1881)
- Mythimna changi (Sugi, 1992)
- Mythimna decisissima (Walker, 1865)
- Mythimna epieixelus (Rothschild, 1920)
- Mythimna exsanguis (Guenee, 1852)
- Mythimna formosicola Yoshimatsu, 1994
- Mythimna hamifera (Walker, 1862)
- Mythimna hannemanni (Yoshimatsu, 1991)
- Mythimna hirashimai Yoshimatsu, 1994
- Mythimna intertexta (Chang, 1991)
- Mythimna pulchra (Snellen, [1886])
- Mythimna purpurpatagis (Chang, 1991)
- Mythimna simplex (Leech, 1889)
- Mythimna plantei Hreblay & Yoshimatsu, 1996
- Mythimna snelleni Hreblay, 1996
- Mythimna stolida (Leech, 1889)
- Mythimna albomarginata Yoshimatsu, 1994
- Mythimna bani (Sugi, 1977)
- Mythimna byssina (Swinhoe, 1886)
- Mythimna celebensis (Tams, 1935)
- Mythimna compta (Moore, 1881)
- Mythimna curvilinea (Hampson, 1891)
- Mythimna divergens Butler, 1878
- Mythimna formosana (Butler, 1880)
- Mythimna guanyuana (Chang, 1991)
- Mythimna insularis (Butler, 1880)
- Mythimna irregularis (Walker, 1857)
- Mythimna lishana (Chang, 1991)
- Mythimna lucida Yoshimatsu & Hreblay, 1996
- Mythimna percussa (Butler, 1880)
- Mythimna polysticha (Turner, 1902)
- Mythimna radiata (Bremer, 1861)
- Mythimna rushanensis Yoshimatsu, 1994
- Mythimna simillima (Walker, 1862)
- Mythimna sinuosa (Moore, 1882)
- Mythimna subplacida (Sugi, 1977)
- Mythimna taiwana (Wileman, 1912)
- Mythimna tangala (Felder & Rogenhofer, 1874)
- Mythimna venalba (Moore, 1867)
- Mythimna yu (Guenee, 1852)
- Mythimna pallidicosta (Hampson, 1894)
- Mythimna separata (Walker, 1865)
- Mythimna arizanensis (Wileman, 1915)
- Mythimna nigrilinea (Leech, 1889)
- Naarda blepharota (Strand, 1920)
- Naarda ochronota Wileman, 1915
- Nacna malachitis (Oberthur, 1880)
- Nagadeba indecoralis Walker, [1866]1865
- Nagadeba obenbergeri Strand, 1919
- Naranga aenescens Moore, 1881
- Neachrostia leechi Wileman, 1915
- Neachrostia limbata Wileman, 1915
- Neochiera dominia (Cramer, 1780)
- Nepalopolia contaminata (Chang, 1991)
- Neustrotia noloides (Butler, 1879)
- Neustrotia rectilineata Ueda, 1987
- Niaccaba sumptualis Walker, 1866
- Niphonyx segregata (Butler, 1878)
- Nodaria externalis Guenee, 1854
- Nodaria zemella (Strand, 1920)
- Nycticia strigidisca (Moore, 1881)
- Nycticia variabilis (Owada, 1983)
- Nyctycia adnivis Kobayashi & Owada, 1998
- Nyctycia endoi (Owada, 1983)
- Nyctycia mesomelana Kobayashi & Hreblay, 1998
- Nyctycia signa Hreblay & Ronkay, 2000
- Nyctycia simonyii Hreblay, 1998
- Nyctycia stenoptera Kobayashi, 1998
- Nyctycia strigidisca Kobayashi, 1998
- Nyctyciomorpha plagiogramma (Hampson, 1906)
- Ochropleura praecox (Linnaeus, 1758)
- Odontestra laszlogabi Hreblay & Ronkay, 2000
- Oglasa costimacula Wileman, 1915
- Oglasa mediopallens Wileman & South, 1917
- Oglasa sordida (Wileman, 1915)
- Olivenebula monticola Kishida & Yoshimoto, 1977
- Olivenebula oberthueri (Staudinger, 1892)
- Olulis puncticinctalis Walker, 1863
- Ommatophora luminosa (Cramer, 1780)
- Ophisma gravata Guenee, 1852
- Ophiusa coronata (Fabricius, 1775)
- Ophiusa disjungens (Walker, 1858)
- Ophiusa microtirhaca Sugi, 1990
- Ophiusa olista (Swinhoe, 1893)
- Ophiusa tirhaca (Cramer, 1777)
- Ophiusa trapezium (Guenee, 1852)
- Ophiusa triphaenoides (Walker, 1858)
- Ophthalmis lincea Jordan, 1912
- Oraesia emarginata (Fabricius, 1794)
- Oroplexia fortunata Hreblay & Ronkay, 1997
- Oroplexia variegata Hreblay & Ronkay, 1997
- Orthosia alishana Sugi, 1986
- Orthosia atriluna Ronkay & Ronkay, 1999
- Orthosia carnipennis (Butler, 1878)
- Orthosia castanea Sugi, 1986
- Orthosia conspecta (Wileman, 1914)
- Orthosia kurosawai Sugi, 1986
- Orthosia limbata (Butler, 1879)
- Orthosia lushana Sugi, 1986
- Orthosia munda (Denis & Schiffermüller, 1775)
- Orthosia nigromaculata (Hone, 1917)
- Orthosia perfusca Sugi, 1986
- Orthozona curvilineata Wileman, 1915
- Orthozona karapina Strand, 1920
- Oruza albigutta Wileman, 1914
- Oruza brunnea (Leech, 1900)
- Oruza divisa (Walker, 1862)
- Oruza glaucotorna Hampson, 1910
- Oruza lacteicosta (Hampson, 1897)
- Oruza stragulata (Pagenstecher, 1900)
- Oxyodes scrobiculata (Fabricius, 1775)
- Ozana chinensis (Leech, 1900)
- Ozarba bipars Hampson, 1865
- Ozarba brunnea (Leech, 1900)
- Ozarba ochritincta Wileman, 1916
- Ozarba punctigera Walker, 1865
- Ozarba uberosa (Swinhoe, 1885)
- Paectes cristatrix (Guenee, 1852)
- Pangrapta adusta (Leech, 1900)
- Pangrapta albistigma (Hampson, 1898)
- Pangrapta costinotata (Butler, 1881)
- Pangrapta lunulata Sterz, 1915
- Pangrapta plumbilineata Wileman & West, 1929
- Pangrapta trilineata (Leech, 1900)
- Panilla constipunctata Leech, 1900
- Panilla dispila (Walker, 1865)
- Panilla mila Strand, 1920
- Panilla minor Yoshimoto, 2001
- Panolis exquisita Draudt, 1950
- Panolis pinicortex Hreblay & Ronkay, 1997
- Panolis variegatoides Poole, 1989
- Pantydia metaspila (Walker, 1858)
- Papuacola costalis (Moore, 1883)
- Paracolax angulata (Wileman, 1915)
- Paracolax apicimacula (Wileman, 1915)
- Paracolax bilineata (Wileman, 1915)
- Paracolax fentoni (Butler, 1879)
- Paracolax pryeri (Butler, 1879)
- Paracolax sugii Owada, 1992
- Paracolax unicolor Wileman & South, 1917
- Paragona dubia Wileman, 1916
- Paurophylla bidentata (Wileman, 1915)
- Penicillaria jocosatrix Guenee, 1852
- Penicillaria maculata Bulter, 1889
- Penicillaria simplex (Walker, 1865)
- Perciana marmorea Walker, 1865
- Perciana taiwana Wileman, 1911
- Pericyma basalis Wileman & South, 1916
- Pericyma cruegeri (Butler, 1886)
- Pericyma glaucinans (Guenee, 1852)
- Peridroma saucia (Hübner, 1808)
- Perigrapha nigrocincta Hreblay & Ronkay, 1997
- Perinaenia accipiter (Felder & Rogenhofer, 1874)
- Perinaenia mingchyrica Babics & Ronkay, 2011
- Phalga clarirena (Sugi, 1982)
- Phlogophora albovittata (Moore, 1867)
- Phlogophora clava (Wileman, 1912)
- Phlogophora conservuloides (Hampson, 1898)
- Phyllodes eyndhovii Vollenhoven, 1858
- Pilipectus taiwanus Wileman, 1915
- Plataplecta pulverosa Hreblay & Ronkay, 1997
- Platyja acerces (Prout, 1928)
- Platyja umminia (Cramer, 1780)
- Plecoptera reflexa Guenee, 1852
- Plecoptera uniformis (Moore, 1882)
- Plexiphleps stellifera (Moore, 1882)
- Plusiodonta coelonota (Kollar, 1844)
- Plusiopalpa adrasta Strand, 1920
- Polia adustaeoides Draeseke, 1928
- Polia goliath (Oberthur, 1880)
- Polia mortua Hreblay & Ronkay, 1997
- Polydesma boarmoides Guenee, 1852
- Polypogon decipiens (Hampson, 1898)
- Potnyctycia cristifera Hreblay & Ronkay, 1997
- Potnyctycia nemesi Ronkay & Ronkay, 2001
- Potnyctycia taiwana (Chang, 1991)
- Progonia brunnealis (Wileman & South, 1916)
- Progonia olieusalis (Walker, 1859)
- Prolophota trigonifera Hampson, 1896
- Protodeltote distinguenda (Staudinger, 1888)
- Protodeltote pygarga (Hufnagel, 1766)
- Pseuderiopus albiscripta (Hampson, 1898)
- Pseudeustrotia bipartita (Wileman, 1914)
- Pseudodeltote coenia (Swinhoe, 1901)
- Pseudodeltote formosana (Hampson, 1910)
- Pseudodeltote postvittata (Wileman, 1914)
- Pseudodeltote subcoenia (Wileman & South, 1916)
- Pseudogyrtona marmorea (Wileman, 1916)
- Pseudogyrtona ochreopuncta Wileman & South, 1916
- Pseudopanolis flavimacula (Wileman, 1912)
- Pseudopanolis lala Owada, 1994
- Pseudosphetta moorei (Cotes & Swinhoe, 1887)
- Psimada quadripennis Walker, 1858
- Pygopteryx fulva Chang, 1991
- Pyrrhia bifasciata (Staudinger, 1888)
- Pyrrhidivalva sordida (Butler, 1881)
- Raparna sordida (Wileman & South, 1916)
- Rema costimacula (Guenee, 1852)
- Rhesala imparata Walker, 1858
- Rhynchaglaea hemixantha Sugi, 1980
- Rhynchaglaea leuteomixta Hreblay & Ronkay, 1998
- Rhynchaglaea perscitula Kobayashi & Owada, 2006
- Rhynchaglaea taiwana Sugi, 1980
- Rhynchaglaea terngjyi Chang, 1991
- Rivula arizanensis Wileman & South, 1916
- Rivula basalis Hampson, 1891
- Rivula cognata Hampson, 1912
- Rivula curvifera Walker, 1862
- Rivula leucanioides (Walker, 1863)
- Rivula niveipuncta Swinhoe, 1905
- Sarbanissa cirrha (Jordan, 1912)
- Sarbanissa interposita (Hampson, 1910)
- Sarbanissa subflava (Moore, 1877)
- Sarcopolia illoba (Butler, 1878)
- Sarcopteron punctimargo Hampson, 1893
- Sasunaga interrupta Warren, 1912
- Sasunaga longiplaga Warren, 1912
- Sasunaga tenebrosa (Moore, 1867)
- Scedopla umbrosa (Wileman, 1916)
- Schrankia seinoi Inoue, 1979
- Sclerogenia jessica (Butler, 1878)
- Scoliopteryx libatrix (Linnaeus, 1758)
- Scriptoplusia nigriluna (Walker, 1858)
- Semiothisops macariata (Hampson, 1902)
- Serrodes campana Guenee, 1852
- Sesamia inferens (Walker, 1858)
- Sesamia nigropunctata (Wileman, 1912)
- Sesamia punctilinea (Wileman, 1912)
- Sesamia punctivena (Wileman, 1914)
- Sesamia submarginalis (Hampson, 1891)
- Sesamia turpis Bulter, 1879
- Sideridis honeyi (Yoshimoto, 1989)
- Sigmuncus albigrisea (Warren, 1914)
- Simplicia bimarginata (Walker, 1863)
- Simplicia caeneusalis (Walker, 1859)
- Simplicia formosana (Strand, 1919)
- Simplicia mistacalis (Guenee, 1854)
- Simplicia niphona (Butler, 1878)
- Simplicia similis (Moore, 1882)
- Simplicia simplicissima Wileman & West, 1930
- Simplicia unipuncta (Wileman, 1915)
- Simplicia xanthoma Prout, 1928
- Simplicia zanclognathalis (Strand, 1920)
- Sinarella interrupta (Wileman, 1915)
- Sinarella itoi Owada, 1987
- Sinarella nigrisigna (Leech, 1900)
- Sineugraphe rhytidoprocta Boursin, 1954
- Sophta diplochorda (Hampson, 1907)
- Sophta olivata (Hampson, 1902)
- Speidelia formosa Ronkay, 2000
- Speidelia taiwana (Wileman, 1915)
- Speiredonia mutabilis Fabricius, 1792
- Speiredonia zamis (Stoll, 1780)
- Sphragifera biplagiata (Walker, 1865)
- Sphragifera sigillata Hreblay & Ronkay, 2000
- Spirama helicina (Hübner, 1831)
- Spirama retorta (Clerck, 1759)
- Spodoptera cilium Guenee, 1852
- Spodoptera connexa (Wileman, 1914)
- Spodoptera exigua (Hübner, 1808)
- Spodoptera litura (Fabricius, 1775)
- Spodoptera mauritia (Boisduval, 1833)
- Spodoptera pecten Guenee, 1852
- Spodoptera picta (Guerin-Meneville, 1838)
- Squamipalpis subnubila Leech
- Stenhypena costalis Wileman & South, 1916
- Stenoloba assimilis Kononenko & Ronkay, 2000
- Stenoloba clarescens Kononenko & Ronkay, 2000
- Stenoloba domina Kononenko & Ronkay, 2000
- Stenoloba lichenosa Kononenko & Ronkay, 2001
- Stenoloba manleyi (Leech, 1889)
- Stenoloba manleyi Kononenko & Ronkay, 2000
- Stenoloba nigrabasalis B.S.Chang, 1991
- Stenoloba nora Kononenko & Ronkay, 2001
- Stenoloba olivacea (Wileman, 1914)
- Stenoloba pulla Ronkay, 2001
- Stenoloba rufosagitta Kononenko & Ronkay, 2001
- Stenoloba yenminia Ronkay, 2001
- Stigmoctenoplusia aeneofusa (Hampson, 1894)
- Subleuconycta palshkovi (Filipjev, 1937)
- Subleuconycta sugii Boursin, 1962
- Sugia rufa Ueda, 1987
- Sugitania chengshinglini Owada & Tzuoo, 2010
- Sugitania uenoi Owada, 1995
- Sympis rufibasis Guenee, 1852
- Sypna diversa Wileman & South, 1917
- Sypnoides chinensis Berio, 1958
- Sypnoides hampsoni (Wileman & South, 1917)
- Sypnoides pannosa (Moore, 1882)
- Sypnoides simplex (Leech, 1900)
- Taeneremina scripta Ronkay & Ronkay, 2001
- Taipsaphida curiosa Ronkay & Ronkay, 1999
- Taivaleria rubrifasciata Hreblay & Ronkay, 2000
- Tamba lala Swinhoe, 1900
- Tamba nagadeboides (Strand, 1920)
- Tamba nigrilineata (Wileman, 1915)
- Tamba parallela (Wileman, 1915)
- Tamba taiwana Yoshimoto, 2002
- Tamba venusta (Hampson, 1898)
- Taralla delatrix (Guenee, 1852)
- Telorta atrifusa Hreblay & Ronkay, 1997
- Telorta obscura Yoshimoto, 1987
- Telorta shenhornyeni Ronkay & Kobayashi, 1997
- Telorta yazakii Yoshimoto, 1987
- Teratoglaea pacifica Sugi, 1958
- Thalatta fasciosa Moore, 1882
- Thyas honesta Hübner, 1824
- Thyas juno (Dalman, 1823)
- Thysanoplusia daubei (Boisduval, 1840)
- Thysanoplusia intermixta (Warren, 1913)
- Thysanoplusia orichalcea (Fabricius, 1775)
- Thysanoplusia reticulata (Moore, 1882)
- Tiliacea melonina (Chang, 1991)
- Tipasa renalis (Moore, [1885]1887)
- Tiracola aureata Holloway, 1989
- Tiracola plagiata (Fabricius, 1857)
- Tolpia myops Hampson, 1907
- Trachea auriplena (Walker, 1857)
- Trachea conjuncta Wileman, 1914
- Trachea punkikonis Matsumura, 1929
- Trichoplusia ni (Hübner, 1803)
- Trigonodes hyppasia (Cramer, 1779)
- Triphaena fuscicollis Butler, 1889
- Triphaenopsis jezoensis Sugi, 1962
- Tycracona obliqua Moore, 1882
- Ulotrichopus macula (Hampson, 1891)
- Virgo major Kishida & Yoshimoto, 1991
- Wittstrotia taroko Speidel & Behounek, 2005
- Xanthia tatachana Chang, 1991
- Xanthodes albago (Fabricius, 1794)
- Xanthodes intersepta Guenee, 1852
- Xanthodes transversa Guenee, 1852
- Xanthoptera apoda Strand, 1920
- Xenotrachea albidisca (Moore, 1867)
- Xenotrachea irrorata Yoshimoto, 1992
- Xestia efflorescens (Butler, 1879)
- Xestia flavilinea (Wileman, 1912)
- Xestia fuscostigma Hreblay & Ronkay, 2000
- Xestia semiherbida (Walker, 1857)
- Xestia tamsi (Wileman & West, 1929)
- Xestia vidua (Staudinger, 1892)
- Xestia yamanei Chang, 1991
- Xylena changi Horie, 1993
- Xylena consimilis Sugi, 1992
- Xylena griseithorax Sugi, 1992
- Xylena lignipennis Sugi, 1992
- Xylena plumbeopaca Hreblay & Ronkay, 2000
- Xylena sugii Kobayashi, 1993
- Xylena tanabei Owada, 1993
- Xylena tatajiana Chang, 1991
- Xylopolia bella Hreblay & Ronkay, 2000
- Xylopolia fulvireniforma Chang, 1991
- Xylostola indistincta (Moore, 1882)
- Yula muscosa (Hampson, 1891)
- Zanclognatha angulina (Leech, 1900)
- Zanclognatha helva (Butler, 1879)
- Zanclognatha inspidalis (Wileman, 1915)
- Zanclognatha nakatomii Owada, 1977
- Zanclognatha nigrisigna (Wileman, 1915)
- Zanclognatha reticulatis (Leech, 1900)
- Zanclognatha subtriplex Strand, 1919
- Zanclognatha tarsipennalis (Treitschke, 1835)
- Zanclognatha yaeyamalis Owada, 1977
- Zethes fuboshona Strand, 1920
- Zonoplusia ochreata (Walker, 1865)
- Zurobata vacillans (Walker, 1864)

== Nolidae ==
- Aiteta musculina Walker, 1856
- Beara tortriciformis (Strand, 1917)
- Blenina angulipennis (Moore, 1882)
- Blenina chlorophila Hampson, 1905
- Blenina puloa Swinhoe
- Blenina quinaria Moore
- Blenina senex (Butler, 1878)
- Camptoloma carum Kishida
- Carea internifusca Hampson
- Carea trimacula (Strand, 1920)
- Carea varipes Walker, [1857]
- Characoma ruficirra (Hampson, 1905)
- Clethrophora distincta (Leech, 1889)
- Dilophothripoides noliformis Strand
- Earias cupreoviridis (Walker, 1862)
- Earias flavida Felder
- Earias insulana (Boisduval, 1833)
- Earias punctaria Wileman
- Earias roseifera Bulter
- Earias vittella (Fabricius, 1794)
- Eligma narcissus (Cramer, 1775)
- Evonima aperta Walker
- Evonima elegans Inoue
- Gabala argentata Bulter
- Gabala roseoretis Kobes
- Gadirtha pulchra Butler, 1886
- Gelastocera exusta Bulter
- Hylophilodes esakii Fukushima
- Hylophilodes rara Fukushima
- Hylophilodes tsukusensis Nagano
- Iragaodes nobilis (Staudinger, 1892)
- Iscadia inexacta (Walker, 1858)
- Iscadia uniformis Warren
- Kerala lentiginosa Wileman, 1914
- Labanda semipars (Walker, 1858)
- Macrobarasa xantholopha (Hampson, 1896)
- Macrochthonia fervens Bulter
- Meganola albula (Denis & Schiffermüller, 1775)
- Meganola argentalis (Wileman & South, 1916)
- Meganola ascripta (Hampson, 1894)
- Meganola diversalis Inoue
- Meganola major Inoue
- Meganola melanomedia Inoue
- Meganola nitida (Hampson, 1894)
- Meganola phaeochroa (Hampson, 1900)
- Meganola pseudohypena Inoue
- Meganola pulverata (Wileman & West, 1929)
- Meganola simplex (Wileman & West, 1929)
- Meganola suisharyonensis (Strand, 1917)
- Meganola tesselata (Hampson, 1896)
- Meganola triangulalis (Leech, 1889)
- Miaromima kobesi (Sugi, 1991)
- Nanaguna sordida Wileman
- Narangodes argyrostrigatus Sugi
- Narangodes confluens Sugi
- Narangodes flavibasis Sugi
- Negeta signata (Walker, 1864)
- Negritothripa hompsoni (Wileman, 1911)
- Nola ceylonica Hampson
- Nola fasciata (Walker, 1866)
- Nola formosalesa (Wileman & West, 1928)
- Nola fuscimarginalis Wileman
- Nola innocua Bulter
- Nola kanshireiensis (Wileman & South, 1916)
- Nola marginata Hampson
- Nola nephodes (Hampson, 1914)
- Nola pallescens Wileman & West
- Nola promelaena Hampson
- Nola pumila Snellen
- Nola punctilineata Hampson
- Nola quadriguttula Inoue
- Nola taeniata Snellen
- Nola tripuncta Wileman
- Nolathripa lactaria (Graeser, 1892)
- Paracrama angulata Sugi
- Pisara thyrophora Hampson
- Plotheia exacta (Semper, 1900)
- Pseudoips sylphina Sugi
- Pterogonaga chinensis Berio
- Rhynchopalpus yoshimotoi Inoue
- Risoba prominens Moore
- Risoba tenuipoda (Strand, 1920)
- Risoba vialis Moore
- Selepa celtis Moore
- Selepa discigera (Walker, 1862)
- Siglophora ferreilutea Hampson, 1895
- Siglophora sanguinolenta (Moore, 1888)
- Sinna extrema (Walker, 1854)
- Titulcia confictella Walker
- Tyana falcata (Walker, 1866)
- Tympanistes fusimargo Prout
- Westermannia elliptica Bryk
- Xenonola limbata (Wileman, 1915)

== Notodontidae ==
- Acmeshachia gigantea (Elwes, 1890)
- Allodontoides tenebrosa (Wileman, 1910)
- Benbowia takamukuana (Matsumura, 1925)
- Besaia obliqua (Wileman, 1914)
- Besaia inconspicua (Wileman, 1914)
- Besaia nebulosa (Wileman, 1914)
- Besaia sordida (Wileman, 1914)
- Besaia crenelata (Swinhoe, 1896)
- Betashachia angustipennis Matsumura, 1925
- Cerura erminea (Matsumura, 1929)
- Chadisra bipars Walker, 1862
- Chadisra bipartita (Matsumura, 1925)
- Cleapa latifascia Walker, 1855
- Clostera anachoreta (Denis & Schiffermüller, 1775)
- Clostera restitura (Walker, 1865)
- Cnethodonta grisescens Matsumura, 1929
- Curuzza ronkayorum (Schintlmeister, 2005)
- Dudusa nobillis Walker, 1865
- Dudusa sphingiformis Moore, 1872
- Dudusa synopla Swinhoe, 1907
- Ellida arcuata (Alphéraky, 1897)
- Euhampsonia cristata (Butler, 1877)
- Euhampsonia formosana (Matsumura, 1925)
- Eushachia aurata Matsumura, 1925
- Fentonia baibarana Matsumura, 1929
- Fentonia macroparabolica Nakamura, 1973
- Fentonia ocypete (Bremer, 1861)
- Fentonia parabolica (Matsumura, 1925)
- Formofentonia orbifer Matsumura, 1925
- Gazalina purificata Sugi, 1993
- Ginshachia elongata Matsumura, 1929
- Harpyia longipennis (Matsumura, 1929)
- Harpyia microsticta (Matsumura, 1927)
- Hexafrenum leucodera (Nakamura, 1978)
- Hexafrenum maculifer Matsumura, 1925
- Higena trichosticha (Hampson, 1897)
- Himeropteryx miraculosa Staudinger, 1887
- Hiradonta angustipennis Nakatomi & Kishida, 1984
- Hupodonta corticalis Butler, 1877
- Hupodonta lignea Matsumura, 1919
- Hyperaeschrella nigribasis (Hampson, [1893])
- Liparopsis formosana Wileman, 1914
- Lophocosma nigrilinea Matsumura, 1929
- Lophocosma sarantuja Schintlmeister, 2005
- Lophontosia fusca Okano, 1960
- Mangea gemina Kishida & Kobayashi, 2004
- Megaceramis lamprosticta Hampson, [1893]
- Megashachia fulgurifera (Walker, 1858)
- Mesophalera bruno Schintlmeister, 1997
- Mesophalera sigmata (Butler, 1877)
- Mesophalera speratus Schintlmeister, 2005
- Metriaeschra apatela Nakamura, 1973
- Micromelalopha baibarana Matsumura, 1929
- Microphalera grisea Kishida, 1984
- Mimopydna kishidai (Schintlmeister, 1989)
- Neocerura liturata (Walker, 1855)
- Neodrymonia taiwana Kobayashi, 2005
- Neodrymonia anmashanensis Kishida, 1994
- Neodrymonia marginalis (Matsumura, 1925)
- Neodrymonia seriatopunctata (Matsumura, 1925)
- Neodrymonia maculata (Moore, 1879)
- Neopheosia fasciata (Moore, 1888)
- Nephodonta taiwanensis Schintlmeister, 2005
- Netria multispinae Schintlmeister, 2006
- Netria viridescens Schintlmeister, 2006
- Norracoides basinotata (Wileman, 1915)
- Notodonta griseotincta Wileman, 1910
- Pantherinus bipunctata (Okano, 1960)
- Paracerura priapus (Schintlmeister, 1997)
- Paracerura subrosea (Matsumura, 1927)
- Paracerura tattakana (Matsumura, 1927)
- Peridea graeseri Kishida, 1987
- Peridea oberthueri (Staudinger, 1892)
- Peridea sikkima Nakamura, 1973
- Periergos antennae Schintlmeister, 2005
- Periergos kamadena (Moore, 1865)
- Periergos magna (Matsumura, 1920)
- Phalera angustipennis (Matsumura, 1919)
- Phalera assimilis (Bremer & Grey, 1852)
- Phalera baoshinchangi Kobayashi & Kishida, 2007
- Phalera combusta (Walker, 1855)
- Phalera flavescens (Bremer & Grey, 1852)
- Phalera obscura Wileman, 1910
- Phalera takasagoensis Matsumura, 1919
- Phalerodonta inclusa Okano, 1960
- Pheosia rimosa Nakamura, 1973
- Pheosiopsis linus Schintlmeister, 2005
- Pheosiopsis lusciniola (Nakamura, 1973)
- Pheosiopsis alishanensis Kishida, 1990
- Pheosiopsis cinerea (Okano, 1959)
- Phycidopsis albovittata Hampson, 1893
- Pseudofentonia diluta (Wileman, 1910)
- Pseudofentonia nakamurai (Sugi, 1990)
- Pseudofentonia medioalbida Nakamura, 1973
- Pseudofentonia nigrofasciata (Wileman, 1910)
- Pseudofentonia argentifera (Moore, 1866)
- Pseudofentonia plagiviridis (Moore, 1879)
- Pseudosomera noctuiformis Bender & Steiniger, 1984
- Ptilodon saturata (Walker, 1865)
- Ptilophora rufula Kobayashi, 1994
- Rachia lineata (Matsumura, 1925)
- Rachiades albimaculata (Okano, 1958)
- Ramesa albistriga (Moore, 1879)
- Ramesa tosta Walker, 1855
- Rosama ornata (Oberthür, 1884)
- Saliocleta virgata (Wileman, 1914)
- Semidonta basalis (Moore, 1865)
- Shaka atrovittata (Matsumura, 1929)
- Somera viridifusca Walker, 1855
- Spatalia dives Oberthur, 1884
- Spatalina ferruginosa (Moore, 1879)
- Stauropus alternus Walker, 1855
- Stauropus basalis Matsumura, 1934
- Stauropus sikkimensis Okano, 1960
- Stauropus teikichiana Matsumura, 1929
- Syntypistis comatus (Leech, 1889)
- Syntypistis cyanea (Leech, 1889)
- Syntypistis lineata (Okano, 1960)
- Syntypistis nigribasalis (Wileman, 1910)
- Syntypistis perdix (Wileman, 1910)
- Syntypistis pryeri (Leech, 1889)
- Syntypistis subgeneris (Strand, 1916)
- Syntypistis umbrosa (Matsumura, 1927)
- Syntypistis viridipicta (Wileman, 1910)
- Tarsolepis japonica Wileman & South, 1917
- Tarsolepis taiwana Wileman, 1910
- Tensha striatella Matsumura, 1925
- Togaritensha curvilinea (Wileman, 1911)
- Torigea formosana Nakamura, 1973
- Uropyia meticulodina (Oberthur, 1884)
- Vaneeckeia pallidifascia (Hampson, [1893])
- Zaranga pannosa Moore, 1884

== Oecophoridae ==
- Ashinaga longimana Matsumura, 1929
- Borkhausenia tyropis Meyrick, 1935
- Casmara patrona Meyrick, 1925
- Endrosis sarcitrella (Linnaeus, 1758)
- Eulechria colonialis Meyrick, 1936
- Formokamaga flavopicta Matsumura, 1931
- Hofmannophila pseudospretella (Stainton, 1849)
- Lamprystica purpurata Meyrick, 1914
- Martyringa xeraula (Meyrick, 1910)
- Oedematopoda ignipicta (Butler, 1881)
- Pachyrhabda citrinacma Meyrick, 1936
- Pedioxestis isomorpha Meyrick, 1932
- Peracma pontiseca Meyrick, 1936
- Periacma asaphochra Meyrick, 1931
- Periacma conioxantha Meyrick, 1931
- Periacma delegata Meyrick, 1914
- Periacma lagophthalma Meyrick, 1932
- Philobota syntropa Meyrick, 1931
- Promalactis sakaiella (Matsumura, 1931)
- Promalactis semantris (Meyrick, 1906)
- Satrapia pyrotechnica Meyrick, 1935
- Stathmopoda auriferalla (Walker, 1864)
- Stathmopoda brachymochla Meyrick, 1937
- Stathmopoda masinissa Meyrick, 1906
- Stathmopoda melitripta Meyrick, 1933
- Stathmopoda opticasis Meyrick, 1931
- Stathmopoda porphyrantha Meyrick, 1913
- Stathmopoda vertibrata Meyrick, 1914
- Xestocasis iostrota (Meyrick, 1910)

== Opostegidae ==
- Pseudopostega epactaea (Meyrick, 1907)
- Pseudopostega similantis Puples & Robinson, 1999

== Palaeosetidae ==
- Ogygioses caliginosa Issiki & Stringer, 1932
- Ogygioses eurata Issiki & Stringer, 1932
- Ogygioses issikii Davis et al., 1995

== Pantheidae ==
- Anacronicta horishana Matsumura, 1931
- Anacronicta nitida (Butler, 1878)
- Panthea grisea Wileman, 1910
- Trichosea champa (Moore, 1879)
- Trichosea diffusa Sugi, 1986
- Trisuloides caerulea Bulter, 1889
- Trisuloides sericea Bulter, 1881
- Trisuloides subflava Wileman, 1911
- Trisuloides taiwana Sugi, 1976

== Peleopodidae ==
- Acria xanthosaris Meyrick, 1909

== Phaudidae ==
- Phauda arikana Matsumura, 1927
- Phauda flammans (Walker, 1854)
- Phauda horishana Matsumura, 1927
- Phauda mimica Strand, 1915
- Phauda rubra Jordan, 1907
- Phauda similis Hering, 1925
- Phauda triadum (Walker, 1854)

== Plutellidae ==
- Anthonympha speciosa Moriuti, 1974
- Caunaca sera (Meyrick, 1886)
- Plutella xylostella (Linnaeus, 1758)
- Tonza citrorrhoa Meyrick, 1905

== Psychidae ==
- Acanthopysche taiwana (Sonan, 1935)
- Eumeta pryeri (Leech, 1888)
- Eurukuttarus tatahashii (Sonan, 1935)
- Kotochalia shirakii Sonan, 1935
- Mahasena kotoensis Sonan, 1935
- Mahasena oolona Sonan, 1935
- Metisa saccharivosa (Sonan, 1935)
- Psyche taiwana (Wileman & South, 1917)
- Pteroma postica (Sonan, 1935)
- Striglocyrbasia meguae Sugimoto & Saigusa, 2001
- Tayalopsyche spinidomifera Sugimoto & Saigusa, 2002

== Pterophoridae ==
- Adaina microdactyla (Huebner, 1813)
- Crombrugghia wahlbergi (Zeller, 1864)
- Deuterocopus lophopteryx T. B. Fletcher, 1910
- Deuterocopus socotranus Rebel, 1907
- Deuterocopus triannulatus Meyrick, 1913
- Diacrotricha fasciola Zeller, 1851
- Exelastis pumilio (Zeller, 1873)
- Hexadactylia trilobata T. B. Fletcher, 1910
- Megalophipida defectalis (Walker, 1864)
- Nippoptilia vitis (Sasaki, 1913)
- Ochyrotica taiwanica Gielis, 1990
- Ochyrotica yanoi Arenberger, 1988
- Oidaematophorus kuwayamai (Matsumura, 1931)
- Oidaematophorus lienigianus (Zeller, 1852)
- Platyptilia chosokeiella Strand, 1922
- Platyptilia citropleura Meyrick, 1908
- Platyptilia farfarella (Zeller, 1867)
- Platyptilia shirozui Yano, 1965
- Platyptilia sythoffi Snellen, 1903
- Pselnophorus japonicus Marumo, 1923
- Pseudoxyroptila tectonica (Meyrick, 1914)
- Pterophorus candidalis (Walker, 1864)
- Pterophorus chosokeialis (Strand, 1922)
- Pterophorus lacteipennis (Walker, 1864)
- Pterophorus melanopoda (T. B. Fletcher, 1907)
- Pterophorus niveodactyla (Pagenstecher, 1900)
- Sphenarches anisodactyla (Walker, 1864)
- Stenoptilia platanodes Meyrick, 1914
- Stenoptiloides taprobanes (Felder & Rogenhofer, 1875)
- Trichoptilus eochrodes Meyrick, 1935

== Pyralidae ==
- Achroia innotata (Walker, 1864)
- Acrobasis bellulella (Ragonot, 1893)
- Acrobasis epicrociella (Strand, 1919)
- Addyme inductalis (Walker, 1863)
- Aglossa dimidiata (Haworth, 1810)
- Anagasta kuehniella (Zeller, 1879)
- Ancylodes lapsalis (Walker, 1859)
- Ancylosis maculifera Ragonot, 1870
- Anerastia stramineipennis Strand, 1919
- Apomyelois ceratoniae (Zeller, 1839)
- Arippara indicator Walker, [1863]
- Assara albicostalis Walker, 1863
- Assara formosana Yoshiyasu, 1991
- Assara funerella (Ragonot, 1901)
- Aurana actiosella Walker, 1863
- Aurana vinaceella (Inoue, 1963)
- Bostra nanalis (Wileman, 1911)
- Cadra cautella (Walker, 1863)
- Cadra figulilella (Gregson, 1871)
- Calguia defiguralis Walker, 1863
- Calinipaxa validalis Walker, [1866]
- Canthelea anpingialis (Strand, 1919)
- Canthelea oegnusalis (Walker, 1859)
- Canthelea taiwanalis (Shibuya, 1928)
- Ceroprepes nigrolineatella Shibuya, 1927
- Ceroprepes ophathalmicela (Christoph, 1881)
- Citripestis sagittiferella (Moore, 1891)
- Coenodomus dudgeoni Hampson, 1896
- Commotria enervella Hampson, 1918
- Comorta nigricostalis (Walker, 1863)
- Conobathra aphidivora (Meyrick, 1934)
- Conobathra birgitella Roesler, 1975
- Corcyra brunnea West, 1931
- Corcyra cephalonica (Stainton, 1866)
- Craneophora ficki Christoph, 1881
- Critonia phaeoneura Hampson, 1918
- Cryptoblabes miserabilis (Strand, 1919)
- Cryptoblabes proleucella Hampson, 1896
- Curena costipunctata Shibuya, 1928
- Dioryctria abietella [Denis & Schiffermüller], 1775
- Dioryctria pryeri Ragonot, 1893
- Dioryctria yiai Mutuura & Munroe, 1972
- Doloessa viridis Zeller, 1848
- Emmalocera anerastica (Snellen, 1880)
- Emmalocera leucocincta (Walker, 1863)
- Emmalocera miserabilis (Strand, 1919)
- Emmalocera umbricostella Ragonot, 1888
- Endotricha consocia (Bulter, 1879)
- Endotricha costaemaculalis Christoph, 1881
- Endotricha metacuralis Hampson, 1916
- Endotricha olivacealis (Bremer, 1864)
- Endotricha portialis Walker, 1859
- Endotricha ruminalis (Walker, 1859)
- Endotricha theonalis (Walker, 1859)
- Endotricha wilemani West, 1931
- Ephestia elutella (Hübner, [1796])
- Epicrocis festivella Zeller, 1848
- Epicrocis hilarella (Ragonot, 1888)
- Epicrocis syntaractis (Turner, 1904)
- Epilepia dentata (Matsumura & Shibuya, 1927)
- Etiella behrii (Zeller, 1848)
- Etiella hobsoni (Butler, 1880)
- Etiella zinckenella (Treitschke, 1832)
- Eurhodope basella Shibuya, 1928
- Eurhodope karenkolla Shibuya, 1928
- Eurhodope ohkunii Shibuya, 1928
- Euzopherodes albicans Hampson, 1899
- Galleria mellonella (Linnaeus, 1758)
- Goya albivenella Ragonot, 1888
- Goya claricostella Ragonot, 1888
- Goya rosella (Hampson, 1896)
- Herculia castanealis Shibuya, 1928
- Herculia ignefimbrialis Hampson, 1906
- Herculia jezoensis Shibuya, 1928
- Herculia pelasgalis (Walker, 1859)
- Herculia taiwanalis Shibuya, 1928
- Hypsipyla formosana Shiraki, 1912
- Hypsopygia mauritialis (Boisduval, 1833)
- Hypsopygia postflava (Hampson, 1893)
- Hypsopygia proboscidalis (Strand, 1919)
- Hypsotropa formosalis Strand, 1919
- Hypsotropa grassa Strand, 1919
- Hypsotropa laterculella (Zeller, 1867)
- Hypsotropa tripartalis Hampson, 1918
- Jocara melanobasis (Hampson, 1906)
- Jocara melanolopha (Hampson, 1912)
- Lamida obscura (Moore, 1888)
- Lamoria adaptella (Walker, 1863)
- Lamoria inostentalis (Walker, 1863)
- Lepidogma tripartita (Wileman & South, 1917)
- Lixa productalis Heppner, 2005
- Locastra muscosalis (Walker, [1866])
- Loryma recusata (Walker, [1863])
- Mampava bipunctella Ragonot, 1888
- Medaniaria kosemponella (Strand, 1919)
- Melanalis flavalis (Hampson, 1917)
- Mimicia pseudolibatrix Heppner, 2005
- Mussidia pectinicornella (Hampson, 1896)
- Neohyalospila leuconeurella (Ragonot, 1888)
- Nephopterix griseofusa (Wileman & South, 1919)
- Oligochroa leucophaeella (Zeller, 1867)
- Oncocera semirubella (Scopoli, 1763)
- Orthaga centralis Wileman & South, 1917
- Orthaga confusa Wileman & South, 1917
- Orthaga edetalis Strand, 1919
- Orthaga euadrusalis Walker, [1859]
- Orthaga oliyacea (Warren, 1891)
- Orthopygia anpingialis (Strand, 1919)
- Orthopygia imbecilis (Moore, 1885)
- Orthopygia nannodes (Bulter, 1879)
- Orthopygia rudis (Moore, 1888)
- Orthopygia sokutsensis (Strand, 1919)
- Orthopygia suffusalis (Walker, [1866])
- Orthopygia tenuis (Bulter, 1880)
- Orybina flaviplaga (Walker, 1863)
- Orybina plangonalis (Walker, 1859)
- Paracme racilialis (Walker, 1859)
- Pempelia ellenella (Roesler, 1975)
- Pempelia maculata (Staudinger, 1876)
- Pempeliella furella (Strand, 1919)
- Phycita formosella (Wileman & South, 1918)
- Phycita southi West, 1931
- Phycita taiwanella Wileman & South, 1919
- Phycitia anpingicola (Strand, 1919)
- Picrogama semifoedalis (Walker, 1866)
- Plodia interpunctella (Hübner, [1813])
- Polycampsis longinasus Warren, 1896
- Poujadia sepicostella Ragonot, 1888
- Propachys nigrivena Walker, 1863
- Ptyomaxia swinhoeella (Ragonot, 1893)
- Pyralis centralis (Shibuya, 1928)
- Pyralis costinotalis Hampson, 1917
- Pyralis farinalis Linnaeus, 1758
- Pyralis manihotalis Guenee, 1854
- Pyralis pictalis (Curtis, 1834)
- Pyralis prepialis (Hampson, 1903)
- Pyralis regalis [Denis & Schiffermüller], 1775
- Pyralis taihorinalis Shibuya, 1928
- Rhinaphe apotomella (Meyrick, 1879)
- Rhinaphe flavescentella (Hampson, 1901)
- Scenedra orthotis (Meyrick, 1894)
- Senachroia elongella Hampson, 1898
- Spatulipalpia albistrialis Hampson, 1912
- Stemmatophora albifimbrialis (Hampson, 1906)
- Stemmatophora flavicaput Shibuya, 1928
- Stemmatophora fuscibaslis (Snellen, 1880)
- Stemmatophora mushana Shibuya, 1928
- Sybrida discinota (Moore, 1866)
- Sybrida inordinata Walker, 1865
- Taiwanastrapometis kikuchii Shibuya, 1928
- Tamraca torridalis (Lederer, 1863)
- Tamraca torridalis Heppner, 2005
- Tegulifera bicoloralis (Leech, 1889)
- Tegulifera erythrolepia (Hampson, 1916)
- Teliphasa albifusa (Hampson, 1896)
- Teliphasa amica (Bulter, 1879)
- Teliphasa baibarana (Shibuya, 1928)
- Teliphasa nubilosa Moore, 1888
- Teliphasa obliquilineata (Shibuya, 1928)
- Teliphasa sakishimensis Inoue & Yamanaka, 1976
- Termioptycha albifurcalis (Hampson, 1916)
- Termioptycha margarita (Butler, 1879)
- Tirathaba aperta (Strand, [1920])
- Tirathaba mundella Walker, 1864
- Toccolosida rubriceps Walker, 1863
- Trebania flavifrontalis (Leech, 1889)
- Volobilis biplaga Shibuya, 1928
- Volobilis chloropterella (Hampson, 1896)
- Volobilis ochridorsalis (Wileman & South, 1919)

== Saturniidae ==
- Actias heterogyna Kishida
- Actias neidhoederi Ong & Yu
- Actias selene C.Felder & R. Felder
- Antheraea formosana Sonan
- Antheraea pernyi (Guérin-Méneville, 1855)
- Antheraea yamamai Inoue
- Attacus atlas Villiard
- Caligula japonica (Shiraki, 1913)
- Caligula jonasi Sonan
- Caligula thibeta Okano
- Eriogyna pyretorum Watson
- Loepa formosensis Mell, 1939
- Loepa mirandula Yen, Naessig, Naumann & Brechlin, 2000
- Rhodinia verecunda Inoue, 1984
- Samia wangi Naumann & Peigler, 2001
- Samia watsoni Matsumura

== Schreckensteiniidae ==
- Corsocasis coronias Meyrick, 1912

== Scythrididae ==
- Scythris sinensis (Felder & Rogenhofer, 1875)

== Sesiidae ==
- Chamanthedon shuisharyonis (Strand, 1917)
- Chimaerosphecia aegerides Strand, 1916
- Cyanophlebia mandarina Arita & Gorbunov, 2001
- Cyanosesia flavicincta Arita & Gorbunov, 2002
- Cyanosesia formosana Arita & Gorbunov, 2002
- Entrichella issikii (Yano, 1960)
- Entrichella trifasciatus (Yano, 1960)
- Gasterostena funebris (Kallies & Arita, 2006)
- Isothamnis prisciformis Arita & Gorbunov, 2001
- Macroscelesia formosana Arita & Gorbunov, 2002
- Melittia cristata Arita & Gorbunov, 2002
- Melittia formosana Matsumura, 1911
- Melittia sangaica Moore, 1877
- Melittia taiwanensis Arita & Gorbunov, 2002
- Milisipepsis taiwanensis Arita & Gorbunov, 2001
- Nokona acaudata Arita & Gorbunov, 2001
- Nokona chrysoides (Zukowsky, 1932)
- Nokona formosana Arita & Gorbunov, 2001
- Nokona inexpenctata Arita & Gorbunov, 2001
- Nokona pilamicola (Strand, 1916)
- Nokona powondrae (Dalla Torre, 1925)
- Oligophlebiella polishana Strand, 1916
- Paradoxecia similis Arita & Gorbunov, 2001
- Paradoxecia taiwana Arita & Gorbunov, 2001
- Paranthrenopsis polishana (Strand, 1916)
- Parenthrenella formosicola (Strand, 1916)
- Pennisetia kumaoides Arita & Gorbunov, 2001
- Pennisetia unicingulata Arita & Gorbunov, 2001
- Scasiba okinawana (Matsumura, 1931)
- Scasiba taikanensis Matsumura, 1931
- Synanthedon auritincta (Wileman & South, 1918)
- Synanthedon mushana (Matsumura, 1931)
- Taikona matsumurai Arita & Gorbunov, 2001
- Teinoarsina longitarsa Arita & Gorbunov, 2002
- Teinotarsina flavicincta Arita & Gorbunov
- Tinthia cuprealis (Moore, 1877)
- Toleria ilana Arita & Gorbunov, 2001
- Trichocerota formosana Arita & Gorbunov, 2002

== Sphingidae ==
- Acherontia lachesis (Fabricius, 1798)
- Acherontia styx Butler, 1876
- Acosmerycoides leucocrapis (Hampson, 1910)
- Acosmeryx anceus Rothschild & Jordan, 1903
- Acosmeryx castanea Rothschild & Jordan, 1903
- Acosmeryx formosana (Matsumura, 1927)
- Acosmeryx naga (Moore, 1858)
- Agrius convolvuli (Linnaeus, 1758)
- Amblypterus mansoni (Matsumura, 1930)
- Ambulyx japonica (Okano, 1959)
- Ambulyx kuangtungensis (Mell, 1922)
- Ambulyx ochracea Butler, 1885
- Ambulyx semiplacida Inoue, 1989
- Ambulyx sericeipennis (Okano, 1959)
- Ampelophaga rubiginosa Kitching & Cadiou, 2000
- Angonyx testacea (Walker, 1856)
- Callambulyx poecillus Clark, 1935
- Cechenena lineosa (Walker, 1856)
- Cechenena minor (Butler, 1875)
- Cechenena subangustata Rothschild, 1920
- Cephonodes hylas (Linnaeus, 1771)
- Clanis bilineata Gehlen, 1941
- Cypa pallens Jordan, 1931
- Cypoides chinensis (Rothschild & Jordan, 1903)
- Dahira rubiginosa Moore, 1888
- Dahira taiwana (Brechlin, 1998)
- Daphnis hypothous (Cramer, 1780)
- Daphnis nerii (Linnaeus, 1758)
- Degmaptera mirabilis (Rothschild, 1894)
- Deilephila elpenor (Linnaeus, 1758)
- Dolbina inexacta (Walker, 1856)
- Gnathothlibus erotus (Cramer, 1777)
- Hemaris affinis (Bremer, 1861)
- Hippotion celerio (Linnaeus, 1758)
- Hippotion rosetta Swinhoe, 1892
- Hippotion velox (Fabricius, 1793)
- Hyles livornica (Esper, 1780)
- Langia zenzeroides Clark, 1936
- Lepchina obliquifascia (Matsumura, 1927)
- Leucophlebia lineata Westwood, 1847
- Macroglossum belis (Linnaeus, 1758)
- Macroglossum bombylans (Boisduval, 1875)
- Macroglossum corythus (Butler, 1875)
- Macroglossum faro (Cramer, 1779)
- Macroglossum fritzei Rothschild & Jordan, 1903
- Macroglossum heliophila (Boisduval, 1875)
- Macroglossum insipida Butler, 1875
- Macroglossum mediovitta Rothschild & Jordan, 1903
- Macroglossum mitchelli (Butler, 1875)
- Macroglossum neotroglodytus Kitching & Cadiou, 2000
- Macroglossum passalus (Drury, 1773)
- Macroglossum poecilum Rothschild & Jordan, 1903
- Macroglossum pyrrhosticta (Butler, 1875)
- Macroglossum saga (Butler, 1878)
- Macroglossum sitiene (Walker, 1856)
- Macroglossum stellatarum (Linnaeus, 1758)
- Macroglossum sylvia (Boisduval, 1875)
- Macroglossum ungues Yen, Kitching & Tzen 2003
- Marumba cristata Clark, 1937
- Marumba dryas (Walker, 1856)
- Marumba gaschkewitschii Clark, 1937
- Marumba saishiuana Matsumura, 1927
- Marumba sperchius Clark, 1937
- Meganoton analis Clark, 1937
- Neogurelca himachala (Butler, 1876)
- Neogurelca hyas (Walker, 1856)
- Parum colligata (Walker, 1856)
- Pentateucha inouei Owada & Brechlin, 1997
- Pergesa actea (Cramer, 1779)
- Phyllosphingia dissimilis Clark, 1937
- Polyptychus chinensis Rothschild & Jordan
- Psilogramma increta (Walker, 1865)
- Psilogramma menephron (Cramer, 1780)
- Rhagastis binoculata Matsumura, 1909
- Rhagastis castor Clark, 1925
- Rhagastis mongoliana (Butler, 1875)
- Rhagastis velata (Walker, 1866)
- Smerinthulus perversa Inoue, 1990
- Sphinx formosana Riotte, 1970
- Theretra alecto (Linnaeus, 1758)
- Theretra boisduvalii (Bugnion, 1839)
- Theretra clotho (Drury, 1773)
- Theretra japonica (Boisduval, 1869)
- Theretra latreillii (Walker, 1856)
- Theretra nessus (Drury, 1773)
- Theretra oldenlandiae (Fabricius, 1775)
- Theretra rhesus (Boisduval, 1875)
- Theretra sihetensis (Walker, 1856)
- Theretra suffusa (Walker, 1856)

== Thyrididae ==
- Addaea polyphoralis (Walker, 1866)
- Banisia fenestrifera Walker, 1863
- Banisia owadai Inoue, 1976
- Calindoea polygraphalis (Walker, [1866])
- Canaea ryukyuensis Inoue, 1965
- Glanycus insolitus Walker, 1855
- Glanycus tricolor Moore, 1879
- Herimba atkinsoni Moore, 1879
- Hypolamprus emblicalis Moore, 1888
- Hypolamprus kamadenalis (Strand, 1920)
- Hypolamprus marginepunctalis (Leech, 1889)
- Hypolamprus reticulatus Wileman, 1916
- Hypolamprus ypsilon (Warren, 1899)
- Pyralioides aurea (Butler, 1881)
- Pyralioides sinuosus (Warren, 1896)
- Rhodoneura erecta Leech, 1889
- Rhodoneura hamifera (Moore, 1888)
- Rhodoneura lactiguttata Hampson, 1920
- Rhodoneura vittula Guenee, 1877
- Sonagara strigipennis Moore, 1882
- Strigulina burgesi Gaede, 1922
- Strigulina mediofascia Swinhoe, 1906
- Strigulina scitaria (Walker, 1862)
- Strigulina venia Whalley, 1976
- Thyris alex Buchsbaum et al., 2006

== Tineidae ==
- Ceratosticha leptodeta Meyrick, 1935
- Cimitra seclusella Walker, 1864
- Coryptilum rutilellum (Walker, 1869)
- Dacrypohanes canastra Meyrick, 1907
- Erechthias atririvis (Meyrick, 1931)
- Erechthias minuscula (Walsingham, 1897)
- Eudarcia defluescens (Meyrick, 1934)
- Euplocamus tanylopha Meyrick, 1932
- Gerontha dracuncula Meyrick, 1928
- Haplotinea subochraceella (Walsingham, 1886)
- Harmaclona tepheantha (Meyrick, 1939)
- Machaeropteris petalacma Meyrick, 1932
- Monopis monochella (Huebner, 1796)
- Morophaga bucephala (Snellen, 1884)
- Morophaga formosana Robinson, 1986
- Morphophagoides moriutii Robinson, 1986
- Mothogenes citrocrana Meyrick, 1932
- Opogona bicolorella (Matsumura, 1931)
- Opogona flavofasciata (Stainton, 1859)
- Opogona leucodeta Meyrick, 1914
- Opogona loxophanta Meyrick, 1936
- Opogona nipponica Stringer, 1930
- Opogona phaeadelpha Meyrick, 1934
- Opogona protographa Meyrick, 1911
- Opogona stathmota Meyrick, 1911
- Pachypsaltis isolens Meyrick, 1914
- Psychoides phaedrospora (Meyrick, 1935)
- Sapheneutis cineracea Meyrick, 1914
- Setomorpha rutella Zeller, 1852
- Spatularia mimosae (Stainton, 1859)
- Tinea argyrocentra Meyrick, 1934
- Tinea croniopa Meyrick, 1934
- Tinea fictrix Meyrick, 1914
- Tinea limenitis Meyrick, 1935
- Tinea metathyris Meyrick, 1935
- Tinea nigrofasciata Shiraki, 1913
- Tinea pellionella Linnaeus, 1758
- Tineola bisselliella (Hummel, 1823)
- Tineovertex melanochrysus (Meyrick, 1911)
- Tinissa indica Robinson, 1976
- Wegneria cerodelta (Meyrick, 1911)

== Tineodidae ==
- Cenoloba argochalca Meyrick, 1939

== Tortricidae ==
- Acanthoclita balanoptycha (Meyrick, 1910)
- Acanthoclita iridorphna (Meyrick, 1936)
- Acleris alnivora Oku, 1956
- Acleris atayalicana Kawabe, 1989
- Acleris auricaput Razowski, 1971
- Acleris bununa Kawabe, 1989
- Acleris cristana Denis & Schiffermüller, 1775
- Acleris enitescens (Meyrick, 1912)
- Acleris extensana (Walker, 1863)
- Acleris formosae Razowski, 1964
- Acleris gatesclarki Kawabe, 1992
- Acleris hohuanshana Kawabe, 1989
- Acleris japonica (Walsingham, 1900)
- Acleris lacordairana (Duponchel, 1836)
- Acleris loxoscia (Meyrick, 1907)
- Acleris lucipara Razowski, 1964
- Acleris luoyingensis Kawabe, 1992
- Acleris nakajimai Kawabe, 1992
- Acleris placata (Meyrick, 1912)
- Acleris pulchella Kawabe, 1964
- Acleris pulcherrima Razowski, 1971
- Acleris rantaizana Razowski, 1966
- Acleris submaccana (Filipjev, 1962)
- Acleris taiwana Kawabe, 1992
- Acleris tremewani Razowski, 1964
- Acleris tsuifengana Kawabe, 1992
- Acleris ulmicola (Meyrick, 1930)
- Acleris venatana Kawabe, 1992
- Acleris yasutoshii Kawabe, 1985
- Acroclita anachastopa Meyrick, 1934
- Acroclita catharotorna Meyrick, 1935
- Acroclita corinthia Meyrick, 1912
- Adoxophyes fasciculana (Walker, 1866)
- Adoxophyes orana (Fischer von Röslerstamm, 1834)
- Adoxophyes privatana (Walker, 1863)
- Aethes cnicana (Westwood, 1854)
- Apeleptera semnodryas (Meyrick, 1936)
- Apotomis platycremna (Meyrick, 1935)
- Archilobesia formosana Diakonoff, 1973
- Archips davisi Kawabe, 1989
- Archips formosanus (Kawabe, 1968)
- Archips paredreus (Meyrick, 1931)
- Archips paterata (Meyrick, 1914)
- Archips sayonae Kawabe, 1985
- Archips seminubilus (Meyrick, 1929)
- Archips shibatai Kawabe, 1985
- Archips taichunganus Razowski, 2000
- Archips taiwanensis Kawabe, 1985
- Argyrotoxa metallastra Meyrick, 1933
- Arotrophora gilligani Razowski, 2009
- Asymmetrarcha xenopa Diakonoff, 1973
- Aterpia microplaca (Meyrick, 1912)
- Bactra cerata (Meyrick, 1909)
- Bactra copidotis Meyrick, 1909
- Bactra furfurana Haworth, 1811
- Bactra hostilis Diakonoff, 1956
- Bactra leucogama Meyrick, 1909
- Bactra minima Meyrick, 1909
- Bactra venosana (Zeller, 1847)
- Bubonoxena spirographa Diakonoff, 1968
- Capua changi Kawabe, 1989
- Celypha orthocosma (Meyrick, 1931)
- Cephalophyes cyanura (Meyrick, 1909)
- Cerace myriopa Meyrick, 1922
- Cerace stipatana Walker, 1863
- Cerace xanthocosma Diakonoff, 1950
- Chiraps alloica (Diakonoff, 1948)
- Choristoneura issikii Yasuda, 1962
- Choristoneura murinana (Hübner, 1796–99)
- Clepsis hohaunshanensis Kawabe, 1985
- Clepsis owadai Kawabe, 1992
- Clepsis provocata (Meyrick, 1912)
- Clepsis razowskii Kawabe, 1992
- Cnesteboda celligera Meyrick, 1918
- Cnesteboda davidsoni Razowski, 2000
- Cochylidia altivaga Diakonoff, 1976
- Costosa rhodantha (Meyrick, 1907)
- Crocidosema lantana Busck, 1910
- Crocidosema plebejana Zeller, 1847
- Cryptaspasma helota (Meyrick, 1905)
- Cryptophlebia amblyopa Clarke, 1976
- Cryptophlebia ombrodelta (Lower, 1898)
- Cryptophlebia repletana (Walker, 1863)
- Cydia haemostacta (Meyrick, 1931)
- Cydia leucostoma (Meyrick, 1912)
- Cydia malesana (Meyrick, 1920)
- Cydia notanthes (Meyrick, 1936)
- Dactylioglypha tonica (Meyrick, 1909)
- Diactenis youngi Razowski, 2000
- Dicephalarcha dependens (Meyrick, 1922)
- Dicephalarcha sicca Diakonoff, 1973
- Dichrorampha sugii Kawabe, 1989
- Dichrorampha tayulingensis Kawabe, 1986
- Diplocalyptis operosa (Meyrick, 1908)
- Diplocalyptis shanpingana Razowski, 2000
- Dudua aprobola (Meyrick, 1886)
- Dudua hemigrapta (Meyrick, 1931)
- Dudua hesperialis Walker, 1864
- Dudua ptarmicopa (Meyrick, 1936)
- Ebodina elephantodes (Meyrick, 1938)
- Enarmonodes aeologlypta (Meyrick, 1936)
- Endothenia banausopis (Meyrick, 1938)
- Endothenia remigera Falkovitsh, 1970
- Epiblema alishana Kawabe, 1986
- Epiblema foenella (Linnaeus, 1758)
- Epinotia bicolor (Walsingham, 1900)
- Epinotia melanosticta (Wileman & Stringer, 1929)
- Epinotia rasdorniana (Christoph, 1881)
- Epinotia rubricana Kuznetsov, 1968
- Epinotia salicicolana Kuznetsov, 1968
- Epinotia shikokuensis Kawabe, 1984
- Epinotia toshimai (Kawabe, 1978)
- Eucoenogenes japonica Kawabe, 1978
- Eucosma melanoneura Meyrick, 1912
- Eucosma pentagonaspis Meyrick, 1931
- Eucosma threnodes (Meyrick, 1905)
- Eudemis gyrotis (Meyrick, 1909)
- Eudemopsis brevis Liu & Bai, 1982
- Eupoecilia ambiguella (Hübner, 1796)
- Eupoecilia kobeana Razowski, 1986
- Eupoecilia wegneri (Diakonoff, 1941)
- Eurydoxa indigena Yasuda, 1978
- Eurydoxa tetrakore (Wileman & Stringer, 1929)
- Gatesclarkeana idia Diakonoff, 1973
- Gatesclarkeana senior Diakonoff, 1966
- Geogepa malacotorna (Meyrick, 1931)
- Geogepa nigropunctata Kawabe, 1985
- Geogepa pedaliota (Meyrick, 1936)
- Geogepa promiscua Razowski, 1977
- Gephyroneura hemidoxa (Meyrick, 1907)
- Gibberifera glaciata (Meyrick, 1907)
- Gnorismoneura exulis Issiki & Stringer, 1932
- Grapholita delineana (Walker, 1863)
- Grapholita molesta (Busck, 1916)
- Gypsonoma attrita Falkovitsh, 1965
- Hedya iophaea (Meyrick, 1912)
- Hedya vicinana (Ragonot, 1894)
- Heleanna melanomochla (Meyrick, 1936)
- Hendecaneura axiotima (Meyrick, 1937)
- Hermenias pilishina Razowski, 2000
- Homona coffearia (Nietner, 1811)
- Homona magnanima Diakonoff, 1948
- Hoshinoa issikii Yasuda, 1962
- Hoshinoa longicellana (Walsingham, 1900)
- Hystrichoscelus spathanum Walsingham, 1900
- Isodemis proxima Razowski, 2000
- Isodemis serpentinana (Walker, 1863)
- Isotenes inae Diakonoff, 1948
- Kennelia albifacies (Walsingham, 1900)
- Kennelia protocyma (Meyrick, 1936)
- Lasiognatha mormopa (Meyrick, 1906)
- Lobesia aeolopa Meyrick, 1907
- Lobesia ambigua Diakonoff, 1954
- Lobesia atsushii Bae, 1993
- Lobesia cunninghamiacola (Liu & Bai, 1977)
- Lobesia genialis (Meyrick, 1912)
- Lobesia lithogonia Diakonoff, 1954
- Lobesia monotana Diakonoff, 1954
- Lobesia postica Bae, 1993
- Lobesia virulenta Bae & Komai, 1991
- Loboschiza koenigana (Fabricius, 1775)
- Lopharcha angustior Diakonoff, 1941
- Lumaria minuta (Walsingham, 1900)
- Matsumuraeses falcana (Walsingham, 1900)
- Matsumuraeses felix Diakonoff, 1972
- Matsumuraeses phaseoli (Matsumura, 1900)
- Meridemis bathymorpha Diakonoff, 1976
- Meridemis invalidana (Walker, 1863)
- Neocalyptis affinisana (Walker, 1863)
- Neocalyptis taiwana Razowski, 2000
- Neocalyptis tricensa (Meyrick, 1912)
- Neohermenias melanocopa (Meyrick, 1912)
- Neopotamia cryptocosma Kawabe, 1992
- Neopotamia formosa Kawabe, 1989
- Neopotamia punctata Kawabe, 1989
- Neopotamia rubra Kawabe, 1992
- Notocelia kurosawai Kawabe, 1986
- Olethreutes orthocosma (Meyrick, 1931)
- Olethreutes perdicoptera (Wileman & Stringer, 1929)
- Olethreutes sideroxyla (Meyrick, 1931)
- Olethreutes trichosoma (Meyrick, 1914)
- Pandemis inouei Kawabe, 1968
- Parepisimia catharota (Meyrick, 1928)
- Pelatea assidua (Meyrick, 1914)
- Peridaedala litigosa (Meyrick, 1912)
- Phaecadophora acutana Walsingham, 1900
- Phaecadophora fimbriata Walsingham, 1900
- Phaecasiophora amoena Kawabe, 1986
- Phaecasiophora attica (Meyrick, 1907)
- Phaecasiophora caryosema (Meyrick, 1931)
- Phaecasiophora cornigera Diakonoff, 1959
- Phaecasiophora fernaldana Walsingham, 1900
- Phaulacantha acyclica Diakonoff, 1973
- Phricanthes flexilineana (Walker, 1863)
- Phtheochroa zophocosma (Meyrick, 1928)
- Phyacionia dativa Heinrich, 1928
- Piercea minimana (Caradja, 1916)
- Proschistis marmaropa (Meyrick, 1907)
- Pseudacroclita hapalaspis (Meyrick, 1931)
- Retinia cristata (Walsingham, 1900)
- Rhodacra pyrrhocrossa (Meyrick, 1912)
- Rhopobota bicolor Kawabe, 1989
- Rhopobota unipunctana (Haworth, 1811)
- Schoenotenini discreta Diakonoff, 1941
- Scoliographa hoplista (Meyrick, 1927)
- Scotiophyes faeculosa (Meyrick, 1928)
- Semniotes abrupta Diakonoff, 1973
- Semnostola mystica Diakonoff, 1959
- Sorolopha aeolochlora (Meyrick, 1916)
- Sorolopha bryana (Felder & Rogenhofer, 1874)
- Sorolopha elaeodes (Lower, 1908)
- Sorolopha herbifera (Meyrick, 1909)
- Sorolopha liochlora (Meyrick, 1914)
- Sorolopha muscida (Wileman & Stringer, 1929)
- Sorolopha plinthograpta (Meyrick, 1931)
- Sorolopha plumboviridis Diakonoff, 1973
- Sorolopha rubescens Diakonoff, 1973
- Sorolopha semiculta (Meyrick, 1909)
- Sorolopha sphaerocopa (Meyrick, 1929)
- Spatalistis aglaoxantha Meyrick, 1924
- Spatalistis christophana (Walsingham, 1900)
- Spilonota algosa Meyrick, 1912
- Spilonota meleanocopa Meyrick, 1912
- Statherotis discana (Felder & Rogenhofer, 1874)
- Statherotis leucaspis (Meyrick, 1902)
- Statherotis olenarcha (Meyrick, 1931)
- Statherotmantis pictana (Kuznetsov, 1969)
- Statherotoxys hedraea (Meyrick, 1905)
- Strepsicrates rhothia (Meyrick, 1910)
- Taiwancylis cladosium Razowski, 2000
- Temnolopha matura Diakonoff, 1973
- Terthreutis bulligera Meyrick, 1928
- Terthreutis dousticta Wileman & Stringer, 1929
- Tetramoera schistaceana (Snellen, 1890)
- Thaumatographa mesostigmatis Diakonoff, 1977
- Theorica lamyra (Meyrick, 1911)
- Tosirips perpulchrana (Kennel, 1901)
- Trymalitis margarias Meyrick, 1905
- Ukamenia sapporensis (Matsumura, 1931)
- Zeiraphera fulvomixtana Kawabe, 1974
- Zeiraphera hohuanshana Kawabe, 1986
- Zeiraphera taiwana Kawabe, 1986

== Uraniidae ==
- Acropteris leptaliata (Guenee, 1857)
- Chundana emarginata (Hampson, 1891)
- Dysaethria cretacea (Butler, 1881)
- Dysaethria erasaria (Christoph, 1881)
- Dysaethria flavistriga (Warren, 1901)
- Dysaethria formosibia (Strand, 1916)
- Dysaethria fulvihamata (Hampson, 1912)
- Dysaethria quadricaudata (Walker, 1861)
- Dysaethria suisharyonis (Strand, 1916)
- Dyseathria conflictaria (Walker, 1861)
- Dyseathria obscuraria (Moore, 1887)
- Epiplema arcuata Warren, 1896
- Epiplema pygmeata (Warren, 1897)
- Epiplema strigulicosta Strand, 1916
- Europlema conchiferata (Moore, 1887)
- Europlema desistaria (Walker, 1861)
- Europlema nivosaria (Walker, 1866)
- Europlema quadripunctata (Wileman, 1916)
- Micronia aculeata Guenee, 1857
- Monobolodes pernigrata (Warren, 1896)
- Monobolodes prunaria (Moore, 1887)
- Monobolodes simulans (Butler, 1889)
- Oroplema oyamana (Walker, 1866)
- Oroplema plagifera (Butler, 1881)
- Phazaca alikangensis (Strand, 1916)
- Phazaca kosemponicola (Strand, 1916)
- Phazaca theclatus (Guenee, 1857)
- Pseudomicronia advocataria (Walker, 1861)
- Pterotosoma castanea (Warren, 1896)
- Warreniplema fumicosta (Warren, 1896)

== Xyloryctidae ==
- Cynicorates tachytoma Meyrick, 1935
- Metathrinca tsugensis (Kearfott, 1910)
- Rhizosthenes falciformis Meyrick, 1935

== Yponomeutidae ==
- Argyresthia ornatipennella Moriuti, 1974
- Argyresthia taiwanensis Moriuti, 1968
- Kessleria insulella Moriuti, 1977
- Lycophantis chalcoleuca Meyrick, 1914
- Lycophantis elongata Moriuti, 1963
- Saridoscelis sphenias Meyrick, 1894
- Sympetalistis petrographa Meyrick, 1935
- Teinoptila guttella Moriuti, 1977
- Thecobathra basilobata Fan, Jin & Li, 2008
- Thecobathra kappa (Moriuti, 1963)
- Thecobathra lambda (Moriuti, 1963)
- Thecobathra partinuda Fan, Jin & Li, 2008
- Xyrosaris luchneuta Meyrick, 1918
- Yponomeuta meguronis (Matsumura, 1931)

== Zygaenidae ==
- Achelura sanguifasciata Horie, 1994
- Agalope formosana Matsumura, 1927
- Agalope pica (Wileman, 1910)
- Agalope trimacula Matsumura, 1927
- Agalope wangi Owada, 1992
- Amesia sanguiflua Hampson, 1919
- Arbudas leno (Swinhoe, 1900)
- Arbudas submacula (Wileman, 1910)
- Artona flavipuncta Hampson, 1900
- Artona hainana Butler, 1876
- Artona martini Efetov, 1997
- Balataea taiwana Wileman, 1911
- Campylotes altissimus Elwes, 1890
- Campylotes maculosa Wileman, 1910
- Chalcosia diana Butler, 1877
- Chalcosia formosana Inoue, 1991
- Chalcosia thaivana owadai Wang, 1999
- Chalcosia thaivana thaivana Jordan, 1907
- Chrysartona stipata (Walker, 1854)
- Clelea formosana Strand, 1915
- Erasmia pulchella Butler, 1889
- Erasmiphlebohecta picturata (Wileman, 1910)
- Eterusia aedea Jordan, 1907
- Eterusia taiwana (Wileman, 1911)
- Formozygaena shibatai Inoue, 1987
- Gynautocera rubriscutellata Hering, 1922
- Histia flabellicornis Hering, 1922
- Hysteroscene extravagans Haring, 1925
- Hysteroscene hyalina (Leech, 1889)
- Illiberis arisana (Matsumura, 1927)
- Illiberis formosensis Strand, 1915
- Illiberis horni (Strand, 1915)
- Illiberis laeva Puengeler, 1914
- Illiberis phacusana Strand, 1915
- Illiberis silvestris (Strand, 1915)
- Illiberis taiwana Efetov, 1997
- Illiberis yeni Efetov, 1997
- Inouela formosensis Efetov, 1999
- Milleria adalifa Strand, 1917
- Morionia sciara Jordan, 1910
- Neochalcosia remota (Walker, 1854)
- Pidorus atratus Butler, 1877
- Pidorus gemina (Walker, 1854)
- Pollanista inconspicua Strand, 1915
- Pryeria sinica Moore, 1877
- Pseudoinope fusca (Leech, 1889)
- Rhodopsona marginata (Wileman, 1910)
- Rhodopsona rutila Jordan, 1910
- Soritia azurea Yen, 2003
- Soritia choui Yen & Yang, 1998
- Soritia strandi Kishida, 1995

== See also ==
- List of butterflies of Taiwan
