= Athymoris =

Scientific classification
- Domain: Eukaryota
- Kingdom: Animalia
- Phylum: Arthropoda
- Class: Insecta
- Order: Lepidoptera
- Family: Lecithoceridae
- Subfamily: Torodorinae
- Genus: Athymoris; Meyrick, 1935

Synonyms
- Cubitomoris Gozmány, 1978 (disputed)

Genus of moths

Athymoris is a genus of moth in the family Lecithoceridae.

== Species ==
- Athymoris aurantiella Park, 2000
- Athymoris dibaliodes Park, 2010
- Athymoris liukueiensis Park, 2000
- Athymoris martialis Meyrick, 1935
- Athymoris paramecola Wu, 1996
- Athymoris phreatosa (Wu, 1994)
- Athymoris subtrigona Park, 2000
