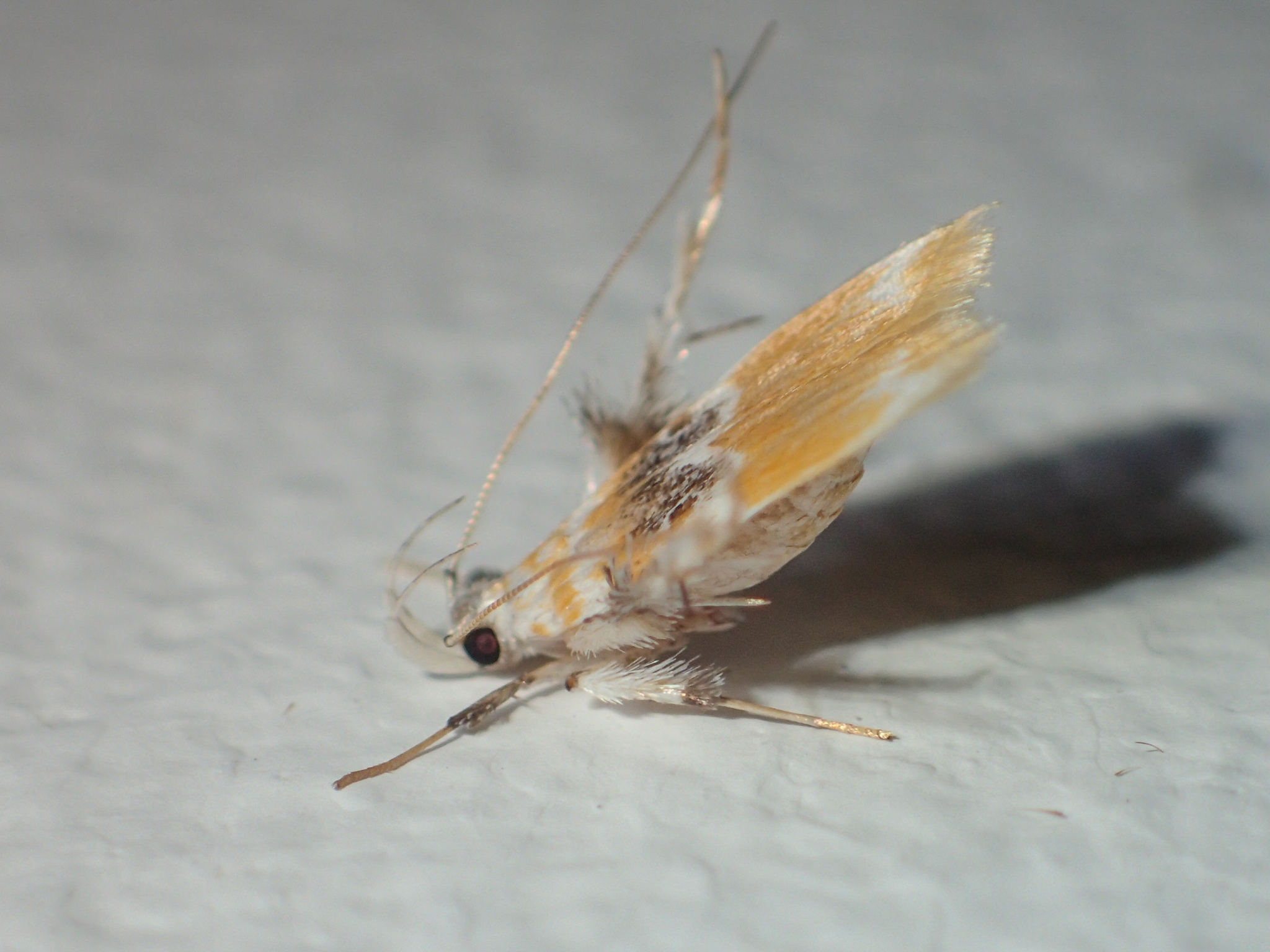
- Torodora epicharis

Scientific classification
- Kingdom: Animalia
- Phylum: Arthropoda
- Clade: Pancrustacea
- Class: Insecta
- Order: Lepidoptera
- Family: Lecithoceridae
- Subfamily: Torodorinae; Gozmány in Amsel et al., 1978

= Torodorinae =

Subfamily of moths

The Torodorinae are a subfamily of small moths in the family Lecithoceridae.

== Taxonomy and systematics ==
- Anaxyrina Meyrick, 1918
- Antiochtha Meyrick, 1905
- Athymoris Meyrick, 1935
- Caveana Park, 2010
- Chrysonasma Park in Park & Byun, 2008
- Coproptilia Snellen, 1903
- Cubitomoris Gozmány in Amsel et al., 1978
- Deltoplastis Meyrick, 1925
- Dixognatha Wu, 2002
- Eccedoxa Gozmány, 1973
- Epharmonia Meyrick, 1925
- Halolaguna Gozmány in Amsel et al., 1978
- Heppneralis Park, 2013
- Hygroplasta Meyrick, 1925
- Hyperochtha Meyrick, 1925
- Lepidozonates Park in Park, Heppner & Lee, 2013
- Nephelographa Gozmány in Amsel et al., 1978
- Notialis Park in Park & Kim, 2009
- Philharmonia Gozmány in Amsel et al., 1978
- Thubana Walker, 1864
- Thymbritis Meyrick, 1925
- Torodora Meyrick, 1894
- Triviola Park, 2010
