= Chrysonasma cassiterota =

Scientific classification
- Kingdom: Animalia
- Phylum: Arthropoda
- Class: Insecta
- Order: Lepidoptera
- Family: Lecithoceridae
- Genus: Chrysonasma
- Species: C. cassiterota

Binomial name
- Chrysonasma cassiterota (Meyrick, 1923)

Synonyms
- Lecithocera cassiterota Meyrick, 1923

Species of moth

Chrysonasma cassiterota is a moth in the family Lecithoceridae. It is found on Luzon island of the Philippines.

The wingspan is 16–17 mm. The forewings are glossy violet-grey with a short pale metallic-blue streak on the base of the costa. The markings are orange, irregularly edged blackish. There are irregular subcostal and median streaks from the base, terminating in a direct transverse antemedian fascia and there is a rather oblique postmedian fascia, where an irregular costal streak runs to near the apex, and a median streak to the termen. There is also a fascia of blackish suffusion mixed orange crossing from the apex of the costal streak to the lower part of the postmedian fascia. A blackish marginal line is found around the apex and termen except on the median streak. The hindwings are grey.
