= Deltoplastis cremnaspis =

Scientific classification
- Domain: Eukaryota
- Kingdom: Animalia
- Phylum: Arthropoda
- Class: Insecta
- Order: Lepidoptera
- Family: Lecithoceridae
- Genus: Deltoplastis
- Species: D. cremnaspis

Binomial name
- Deltoplastis cremnaspis (Meyrick, 1905)

Synonyms
- Onebala cremnaspis Meyrick, 1905

Species of moth

Deltoplastis cremnaspis is a moth in the family Lecithoceridae. It was described by Edward Meyrick in 1905. It is found in Sri Lanka.

The wingspan is 21–22 mm. The forewings are bronzy fuscous with the extreme costal edge whitish ochreous except towards the base. The markings are blackish fuscous, finely edged with whitish ochreous and there is an irregular triangular dorsal blotch before the middle, reaching four-fifths across the wing, confluent on the dorsum with a triangular posterior dorsal patch of dark fuscous suffusion, the apex of which reaches the costa at three-fourths, its posterior edge is limited by a nearly straight fine whitish-ochreous line. A small spot is found on the costa before the middle, and a small oblique oval spot in the disc beyond the middle. The hindwings are pale ochreous, the apex and termen narrowly suffused with fuscous.
