= Coproptilia =

Scientific classification
- Domain: Eukaryota
- Kingdom: Animalia
- Phylum: Arthropoda
- Class: Insecta
- Order: Lepidoptera
- Family: Lecithoceridae
- Subfamily: Torodorinae
- Genus: Coproptilia; Snellen, 1903

Genus of moths

Coproptilia is a genus of moth in the family Lecithoceridae. It occurs in East and Southeast Asia.

== Species ==
There are three recognized species:

- Coproptilia diona Wu, 1994
- Coproptilia glebicolorella Snellen, 1903
- Coproptilia tawiensis Park, 2009
