= Philharmonia basinigra =

Scientific classification
- Domain: Eukaryota
- Kingdom: Animalia
- Phylum: Arthropoda
- Class: Insecta
- Order: Lepidoptera
- Family: Lecithoceridae
- Genus: Philharmonia
- Species: P. basinigra

Binomial name
- Philharmonia basinigra Wang & Wang, 2015

Species of moth

Philharmonia basinigra is a moth in the family Lecithoceridae. It was described by Wang and Wang in 2015. It is found in China (Tibet, Fujian, Guangdong, Jiangxi, Zhejiang).
