= Hygroplasta chunshengi =

Scientific classification
- Domain: Eukaryota
- Kingdom: Animalia
- Phylum: Arthropoda
- Class: Insecta
- Order: Lepidoptera
- Family: Lecithoceridae
- Genus: Hygroplasta
- Species: H. chunshengi

Binomial name
- Hygroplasta chunshengi Pathania & Rose, 2004

Species of moth

Hygroplasta chunshengi is a moth in the family Lecithoceridae. It was described by Pathania and Rose in 2004. It is found in India (Himachal Pradesh, Dehradun).
