= Lepidozonates prominens =

Scientific classification
- Kingdom: Animalia
- Phylum: Arthropoda
- Clade: Pancrustacea
- Class: Insecta
- Order: Lepidoptera
- Family: Lecithoceridae
- Genus: Lepidozonates
- Species: L. prominens

Binomial name
- Lepidozonates prominens Park, Heppner & S. M. Lee, 2013

Species of moth

Lepidozonates prominens is a moth in the family Lecithoceridae. It was described by Kyu-Tek Park, John B. Heppner and Sang-Mi Lee in 2013. It is found in Thailand.
