= Deltoplastis similella =

Scientific classification
- Kingdom: Animalia
- Phylum: Arthropoda
- Class: Insecta
- Order: Lepidoptera
- Family: Lecithoceridae
- Genus: Deltoplastis
- Species: D. similella

Binomial name
- Deltoplastis similella (Snellen, 1903)

Synonyms
- Gelechia similella Snellen, 1903

Species of moth

Deltoplastis similella is a moth in the family Lecithoceridae. It was described by Snellen in 1903. It is found on Java.

The wingspan is about 20 mm. The forewings are clay greyish, somewhat lighter and yellower at the margin near the base. The hindwings are brownish grey.
