= Lepidozonates viciniolus =

Scientific classification
- Kingdom: Animalia
- Phylum: Arthropoda
- Class: Insecta
- Order: Lepidoptera
- Family: Lecithoceridae
- Genus: Lepidozonates
- Species: L. viciniolus

Binomial name
- Lepidozonates viciniolus Park, 2013

Species of moth

Lepidozonates viciniolus is a moth in the family Lecithoceridae. It was described by Kyu-Tek Park in 2013. It is found in Taiwan.
