= Hygroplasta =

Scientific classification
- Domain: Eukaryota
- Kingdom: Animalia
- Phylum: Arthropoda
- Class: Insecta
- Order: Lepidoptera
- Family: Lecithoceridae
- Subfamily: Torodorinae
- Genus: Hygroplasta; Meyrick, 1925

Genus of moths

Hygroplasta is a genus of moths in the family Lecithoceridae.

== Species ==
- Hygroplasta atrifasciata Park, 2003
- Hygroplasta canitiana Wu & Park, 1998
- Hygroplasta chunshengi Pathania & Rose, 2004
- Hygroplasta continctella (Walker, 1864)
- Hygroplasta lygaea (Meyrick, 1911)
- Hygroplasta merinxa Wu & Park, 1998
- Hygroplasta monila Wu & Park, 1998
- Hygroplasta monodryas (Meyrick, 1914)
- Hygroplasta notolatra Wu, 1998
- Hygroplasta onyxijuxta Wu & Park, 1998
- Hygroplasta parviella Park, 2003
- Hygroplasta plocioura Park, 2003
- Hygroplasta promyctera Wu & Park, 1998
- Hygroplasta spoliatella (Walker, 1864)
- Hygroplasta utricula Wu & Park, 1998
