= Deltoplastis ocreata =

Scientific classification
- Domain: Eukaryota
- Kingdom: Animalia
- Phylum: Arthropoda
- Class: Insecta
- Order: Lepidoptera
- Family: Lecithoceridae
- Genus: Deltoplastis
- Species: D. ocreata

Binomial name
- Deltoplastis ocreata (Meyrick, 1910)

Synonyms
- Onebala ocreata Meyrick, 1910

Species of moth

Deltoplastis ocreata is a moth in the family Lecithoceridae. It was described by Edward Meyrick in 1910. It is found in southern India.

The wingspan is about 22 mm. The forewings are fuscous, sprinkled with whitish and with the costal edge whitish ochreous, on the basal fourth dark fuscous, with a small blackish-fuscous basal spot and a very large blackish-fuscous triangular blotch edged with whitish extending on the dorsum from near the base to beyond the middle, and nearly reaching the costa at two-fifths. There are two connected small round dark fuscous spots on the transverse vein, edged with whitish and a large rounded blackish-fuscous blotch immediately beyond this, connected by short bars with the costa at five-sixths and the dorsum before the tornus, edged with whitish. A blackish line is found around the apex and termen. The hindwings are fuscous.
