= Nephelographa =

Scientific classification
- Kingdom: Animalia
- Phylum: Arthropoda
- Clade: Pancrustacea
- Class: Insecta
- Order: Lepidoptera
- Family: Lecithoceridae
- Subfamily: Torodorinae
- Genus: Nephelographa; Gozmány, 1978
- Species: N. panni

Binomial name
- Nephelographa panni Gozmány, 1978

Genus of moths

Nephelographa is a genus of moth in the family Lecithoceridae. It contains the species Nephelographa panni, which is found in Afghanistan.
