= Heppneralis =

Scientific classification
- Kingdom: Animalia
- Phylum: Arthropoda
- Clade: Pancrustacea
- Class: Insecta
- Order: Lepidoptera
- Family: Lecithoceridae
- Subfamily: Torodorinae
- Genus: Heppneralis; Park, 2013

Genus of moths

Heppneralis is a genus of moths in the family Lecithoceridae. It is endemic to Sulawesi. It is named for John B. Heppner.

The wingspan is 16–18 mm (0.63–0.71 in).

== Species ==
There are two accepted species:

- Heppneralis decorella Park, 2013
- Heppneralis dumogaensis Park, 2013
