= Hygroplasta utricula =

Scientific classification
- Kingdom: Animalia
- Phylum: Arthropoda
- Clade: Pancrustacea
- Class: Insecta
- Order: Lepidoptera
- Family: Lecithoceridae
- Genus: Hygroplasta
- Species: H. utricula

Binomial name
- Hygroplasta utricula Wu & Park, 1998

Species of moth

Hygroplasta utricula is a moth in the family Lecithoceridae. It was described by Chun-Sheng Wu and Kyu-Tek Park in 1998. It is found in Sri Lanka.

The wingspan is 12–14 mm. The forewings are ochreous with a blackish-brown pattern. The fold-dot is small and the discal spots are large. The hindwings are ochreous to brown.

== Etymology ==
The species name is derived from Latin utriculus (meaning small bag).
