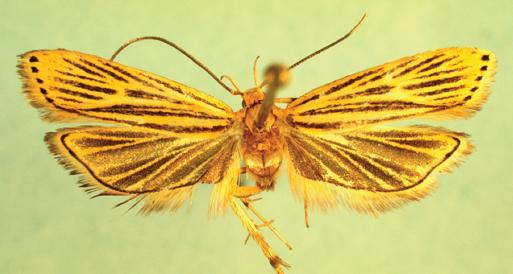
- Caveana senuri

Scientific classification
- Kingdom: Animalia
- Phylum: Arthropoda
- Class: Insecta
- Order: Lepidoptera
- Family: Lecithoceridae
- Subfamily: Torodorinae
- Genus: Caveana; Park, 2010

= Caveana =

Genus of moths

Caveana is a genus of moths in the family Lecithoceridae. It occurs in Southeast and East Asia.

== Species ==
There are three species:

- Caveana diemseoki Park, 2010
- Caveana plenalinea Park, 2017
- Caveana senuri Park, 2013
