= Coproptilia diona =

Scientific classification
- Kingdom: Animalia
- Phylum: Arthropoda
- Clade: Pancrustacea
- Class: Insecta
- Order: Lepidoptera
- Family: Lecithoceridae
- Genus: Coproptilia
- Species: C. diona

Binomial name
- Coproptilia diona Wu, 1994

Species of moth

Coproptilia diona is a moth in the family Lecithoceridae. It was described by Chun-Sheng Wu in 1994. It is found in Jiangxi, China.
