= Deltoplastis byssina =

Scientific classification
- Domain: Eukaryota
- Kingdom: Animalia
- Phylum: Arthropoda
- Class: Insecta
- Order: Lepidoptera
- Family: Lecithoceridae
- Genus: Deltoplastis
- Species: D. byssina

Binomial name
- Deltoplastis byssina (Meyrick, 1910)

Synonyms
- Onebala byssina Meyrick, 1910

Species of moth

Deltoplastis byssina is a moth in the family Lecithoceridae. It was described by Edward Meyrick in 1910. It is found in Sri Lanka.

The wingspan is about 19 mm. The forewings are pale fuscous, sprinkled with dark fuscous. There is a small dark fuscous spot on the base of the costa and the costal edge is ochreous whitish from one-third to four-fifths. There is a small oblique blackish mark on the costa at two-fifths and a small dark fuscous spot on the dorsum. The stigmata are small and dark fuscous, the plical is rather obliquely beyond the first discal, an additional dot is found beneath and slightly beyond the second discal and there is a faintly incurved slender ochreous-whitish line from four-fifths of the costa to the dorsum before the tornus, edged anteriorly with rather dark fuscous suffusion. Several dark fuscous marginal marks are found around the apex and termen. The hindwings are whitish yellowish, the apex and upper part of the termen are suffused with fuscous.
