= Coproptilia tawiensis =

Scientific classification
- Kingdom: Animalia
- Phylum: Arthropoda
- Class: Insecta
- Order: Lepidoptera
- Family: Lecithoceridae
- Genus: Coproptilia
- Species: C. tawiensis

Binomial name
- Coproptilia tawiensis Park, 2009

Species of moth

Coproptilia tawiensis is a moth in the family Lecithoceridae. It was described by Kyu-Tek Park in 2009. It is found on Tawi-Tawi in the Philippines.
