= Deltoplastis leptobrocha =

Scientific classification
- Domain: Eukaryota
- Kingdom: Animalia
- Phylum: Arthropoda
- Class: Insecta
- Order: Lepidoptera
- Family: Lecithoceridae
- Genus: Deltoplastis
- Species: D. leptobrocha

Binomial name
- Deltoplastis leptobrocha (Meyrick, 1923)

Synonyms
- Onebala leptobrocha Meyrick, 1923

Species of moth

Deltoplastis leptobrocha is a moth in the family Lecithoceridae. It was described by Edward Meyrick in 1923. It is found in southern India.

The wingspan is about 14 mm. The forewings are brownish fuscous, and the basal third suffused with grey. The markings are bluish leaden. There is an angulated transverse streak before the middle, the costa from this is dark fuscous, cut by small white marks at the middle and four-fifths, from the first a line running to the dorsum before the tornus with a posterior loop line leaving it near the costa and rejoining it near the dorsum, from the second a direct transverse line to the tornus with a slight outward sinus in the middle. A black streak is found along the apical part of the costa and a line along the termen, within these there is a bluish-leaden streak. The hindwings are grey.
