= Hygroplasta spoliatella =

Scientific classification
- Kingdom: Animalia
- Phylum: Arthropoda
- Class: Insecta
- Order: Lepidoptera
- Family: Lecithoceridae
- Genus: Hygroplasta
- Species: H. spoliatella

Binomial name
- Hygroplasta spoliatella (Walker, 1864)

Synonyms
- Gelechia spoliatella Walker, 1864; Cryptolechia diluticornis Walsingham, [1886]

Species of moth

Hygroplasta spoliatella is a moth in the family Lecithoceridae. It was described by Francis Walker in 1864. It is found in Sri Lanka.

The wingspan is about 18 mm. The forewings are uniform brownish grey with a lilac tinge throughout, with the exception of a few ochreous scales at the extreme base below the costa, and three deep brown spots, the one adjacent to the pale patch at the base, the second slightly above the middle of the wing about one-third from the base, the third at the end of the discal cell, the latter being the most conspicuous of the three. The hindwings are pale cinereous.
