= Deltoplastis acrophanes =

Scientific classification
- Domain: Eukaryota
- Kingdom: Animalia
- Phylum: Arthropoda
- Class: Insecta
- Order: Lepidoptera
- Family: Lecithoceridae
- Genus: Deltoplastis
- Species: D. acrophanes

Binomial name
- Deltoplastis acrophanes (Meyrick, 1910)

Synonyms
- Onebala acrophanes Meyrick, 1910

Species of moth

Deltoplastis acrophanes is a moth in the family Lecithoceridae. It was described by Edward Meyrick in 1910. It is found in Sri Lanka.

The wingspan is 16–20 mm. The forewings are rather dark fuscous, with a slight purplish gloss and an inwardly oblique cloudy darker shade from the dorsum before the middle, reaching two-thirds of the way across the wing, often obsolete. The second discal stigma is cloudy, dark fuscous and also often obsolete. There is a fine line of whitish scales from five-sixths of the costa to the tornus, very indistinct except at the extremities. An interrupted black line is found around the apex and termen. The hindwings are fuscous, tinged anteriorly with pale ochreous.
