= Lepidozonates =

Scientific classification
- Domain: Eukaryota
- Kingdom: Animalia
- Phylum: Arthropoda
- Class: Insecta
- Order: Lepidoptera
- Family: Lecithoceridae
- Subfamily: Torodorinae
- Genus: Lepidozonates; Park in Park, Heppner & Lee, 2013

Genus of moths

Lepidozonates is a genus of moths in the family Lecithoceridae.

== Species ==
- Lepidozonates prominens Park, Heppner & Lee, 2013
- Lepidozonates tenebrosellus Park, 2013
- Lepidozonates viciniolus Park, 2013
