= Thymbritis =

Scientific classification
- Kingdom: Animalia
- Phylum: Arthropoda
- Class: Insecta
- Order: Lepidoptera
- Family: Lecithoceridae
- Subfamily: Torodorinae
- Genus: Thymbritis; Meyrick, 1925
- Species: T. molybdias

Binomial name
- Thymbritis molybdias (Meyrick, 1910)

Synonyms
- Onebala molybdias Meyrick, 1910

Genus of moths

Thymbritis is a genus of moth in the family Lecithoceridae. It contains the species Thymbritis molybdias, which is found in Sri Lanka.

The wingspan is 13–15 mm. The forewings are brownish, sprinkled with dark fuscous and with a bright leaden-metallic spot lying along the upper part of the termen, preceded by a transverse series of five small white marks edged posteriorly with some black scales. There is a black dot in the apex. The hindwings are rather dark grey.
