= Philharmonia (moth) =

Scientific classification
- Kingdom: Animalia
- Phylum: Arthropoda
- Clade: Pancrustacea
- Class: Insecta
- Order: Lepidoptera
- Family: Lecithoceridae
- Subfamily: Torodorinae
- Genus: Philharmonia; Gozmány, 1978

Genus of moths

Philharmonia is a genus of moth in the family Lecithoceridae.

== Species ==
- Philharmonia adusta Park, 2000
- Philharmonia basinigra Wang & Wang, 2015
- Philharmonia calypsa Wu, 1994
- Philharmonia eurysia Wu, 2000
- Philharmonia filiale Gozmány, 2002
- Philharmonia insigna Wu & Park, 1999
- Philharmonia melona Wu, 1994
- Philharmonia paratona Gozmány, 1978
- Philharmonia spinula Wu, 2003
