= Deltoplastis gypsopeda =

Scientific classification
- Domain: Eukaryota
- Kingdom: Animalia
- Phylum: Arthropoda
- Class: Insecta
- Order: Lepidoptera
- Family: Lecithoceridae
- Genus: Deltoplastis
- Species: D. gypsopeda

Binomial name
- Deltoplastis gypsopeda Meyrick, 1934

Species of moth

Deltoplastis gypsopeda is a moth in the family Lecithoceridae. It was described by Edward Meyrick in 1934. It is found in western China.
