= Athymoris phreatosa =

Scientific classification
- Kingdom: Animalia
- Phylum: Arthropoda
- Class: Insecta
- Order: Lepidoptera
- Family: Lecithoceridae
- Genus: Athymoris
- Species: A. phreatosa

Binomial name
- Athymoris phreatosa (Wu, 1994)

Synonyms
- Cubitomoris phreatosa C.S. Wu, 1994

Species of moth

Athymoris phreatosa is a moth in the family Lecithoceridae. It is found in China (Sichuan) and Taiwan.

The wingspan is about 17 mm. The species differs from related species by the dark brown ground colour and a white spot at the costal two-thirds.
