= Deltoplastis clerodotis =

Scientific classification
- Domain: Eukaryota
- Kingdom: Animalia
- Phylum: Arthropoda
- Class: Insecta
- Order: Lepidoptera
- Family: Lecithoceridae
- Genus: Deltoplastis
- Species: D. clerodotis

Binomial name
- Deltoplastis clerodotis (Meyrick, 1910)

Synonyms
- Onebala clerodotis Meyrick, 1910

Species of moth

Deltoplastis clerodotis is a moth in the family Lecithoceridae. It was described by Edward Meyrick in 1910. It is found in Sri Lanka.

The wingspan is 13–14 mm. The forewings are fuscous, with a few dark fuscous scales and a small blackish spot on the base of the costa, as well as a rounded-transverse blackish-fuscous blotch extending on the dorsum from one-fourth to one-half and reaching two-thirds of the way across the wing, partially whitish edged. There is an oblique blackish mark on the costa before the middle, edged with ochreous whitish. A curved-transverse blackish-fuscous mark is found on the transverse vein, edged with ochreous whitish and there is a moderate blackish-fuscous fascia adjacent to this posteriorly, edged posteriorly by an ochreous-whitish line from five-sixths of the costa to the tornus. A black marginal line is found around the apex. The hindwings are rather dark grey.
