= Deltoplastis figurata =

Scientific classification
- Domain: Eukaryota
- Kingdom: Animalia
- Phylum: Arthropoda
- Class: Insecta
- Order: Lepidoptera
- Family: Lecithoceridae
- Genus: Deltoplastis
- Species: D. figurata

Binomial name
- Deltoplastis figurata (Meyrick, 1910)

Synonyms
- Onebala figurata Meyrick, 1910

Species of moth

Deltoplastis figurata is a moth in the family Lecithoceridae. It was described by Edward Meyrick in 1910. It is found in Sri Lanka.

The wingspan is 17–18 mm. The forewings are light fuscous, slightly purplish tinged, more or less suffused with whitish ochreous on the costal half. There is a small spot of dark fuscous suffusion on the base of the costa and a fascia-form blackish-fuscous spot from the dorsum before the middle, reaching two-thirds across the wing. A short dark fuscous oblique streak is found on the costa before the middle and a slender sometimes interrupted dark fuscous pale-edged mark on the transverse vein. There is also a somewhat incurved whitish-ochreous line from the costa to the tornus, edged anteriorly by more or less dark fuscous suffusion. A dark fuscous interrupted line is found around the apex and termen. The hindwings are light fuscous tinged with ochreous.
