= Deltoplastis =

Scientific classification
- Kingdom: Animalia
- Phylum: Arthropoda
- Class: Insecta
- Order: Lepidoptera
- Family: Lecithoceridae
- Subfamily: Torodorinae
- Genus: Deltoplastis; Meyrick, 1925

Genus of moths

Deltoplastis is a genus of moths in the family Lecithoceridae. The genus was erected by Edward Meyrick in 1925.

== Species ==
- Deltoplastis acrophanes (Meyrick, 1910)
- Deltoplastis amicella (Walker, 1864)
- Deltoplastis apostatis Meyrick, 1932
- Deltoplastis balanitis (Meyrick, 1910)
- Deltoplastis byssina (Meyrick, 1910)
- Deltoplastis caduca (Meyrick, 1910)
- Deltoplastis causidica (Meyrick, 1910)
- Deltoplastis clerodotis (Meyrick, 1910)
- Deltoplastis coercita (Meyrick, 1923)
- Deltoplastis cognata C. S. Wu & Park, 1998
- Deltoplastis commatopa Meyrick, 1932
- Deltoplastis commodata (Meyrick, 1923)
- Deltoplastis cremnaspis (Meyrick, 1905)
- Deltoplastis figurata (Meyrick, 1910)
- Deltoplastis figurodigita C. S. Wu & Park, 1998
- Deltoplastis gypsopeda Meyrick, 1934
- Deltoplastis horistis (Meyrick, 1910)
- Deltoplastis lamellospina C. S. Wu & Park, 1998
- Deltoplastis leptobrocha (Meyrick, 1923)
- Deltoplastis lobigera Gozmány, 1978
- Deltoplastis ocreata (Meyrick, 1910)
- Deltoplastis ovatella Park & Heppner, 2001
- Deltoplastis prionaspis Gozmány, 1978
- Deltoplastis propensa (Meyrick, 1910)
- Deltoplastis scopulosa Meyrick, 1910
- Deltoplastis similella (Snellen, 1903)
- Deltoplastis sincera (Diakonoff, 1952)
- Deltoplastis straminicornis (Meyrick, 1910)
- Deltoplastis tetradelta (Meyrick, 1906)
