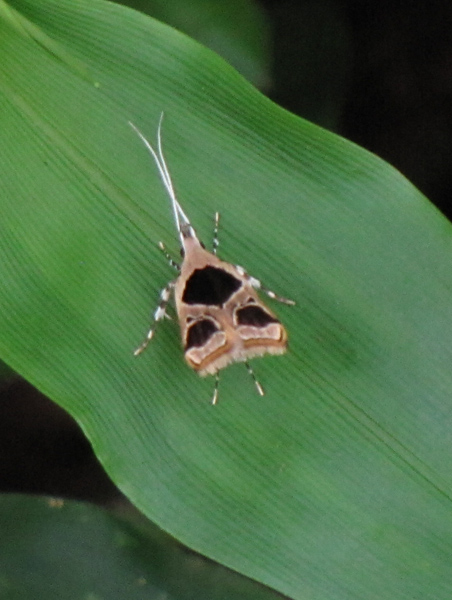

Scientific classification
- Kingdom: Animalia
- Phylum: Arthropoda
- Class: Insecta
- Order: Lepidoptera
- Family: Lecithoceridae
- Genus: Deltoplastis
- Species: D. commatopa

Binomial name
- Deltoplastis commatopa Meyrick, 1932

= Deltoplastis commatopa =

Species of moth

Deltoplastis commatopa is a moth in the family Lecithoceridae. It is found in Taiwan and the provinces of Jiangxi, Hunan, Hubei and Sichuan in China. It is a common species in Taiwan where it has been recorded at elevations of 300–2,260 m (980–7,410 ft) above sea level.
