= Chrysonasma caliginosa =

Scientific classification
- Kingdom: Animalia
- Phylum: Arthropoda
- Class: Insecta
- Order: Lepidoptera
- Family: Lecithoceridae
- Genus: Chrysonasma
- Species: C. caliginosa

Binomial name
- Chrysonasma caliginosa Park and Byun, 2008

Species of moth

Chrysonasma caliginosa is a moth in the family Lecithoceridae. It is found on Palawan island of the Philippines.
