= Lepidozonates tenebrosellus =

Scientific classification
- Kingdom: Animalia
- Phylum: Arthropoda
- Clade: Pancrustacea
- Class: Insecta
- Order: Lepidoptera
- Family: Lecithoceridae
- Genus: Lepidozonates
- Species: L. tenebrosellus

Binomial name
- Lepidozonates tenebrosellus Park, 2013

Species of moth

Lepidozonates tenebrosellus is a moth in the family Lecithoceridae. It was described by Kyu-Tek Park in 2013. It is found in Thailand and Cambodia.
