= Deltoplastis horistis =

Scientific classification
- Domain: Eukaryota
- Kingdom: Animalia
- Phylum: Arthropoda
- Class: Insecta
- Order: Lepidoptera
- Family: Lecithoceridae
- Genus: Deltoplastis
- Species: D. horistis

Binomial name
- Deltoplastis horistis (Meyrick, 1910)

Synonyms
- Onebala horistis Meyrick, 1910

Species of moth

Deltoplastis horistis is a moth in the family Lecithoceridae. It was described by Edward Meyrick in 1910. It is found in Assam, India.

The wingspan is about 21 mm. The forewings are blackish fuscous with the costal area above a line running from the base of the dorsum to four-fifths of the costa whitish ochreous, within this, the basal third of the costa is suffused with dark fuscous, the rest of the costal edge ochreous orange. There is a slender whitish-ochreous streak running from this pale costal area in the middle of the wing to the dorsum near the tornus and there is a slightly irregular white line from the costa near the apex to the tornus. Some cloudy white submarginal dots are found around the apex and termen, and there is a black marginal line. The hindwings are fuscous, towards the base paler and yellowish tinged.
