= Deltoplastis cognata =

Scientific classification
- Kingdom: Animalia
- Phylum: Arthropoda
- Clade: Pancrustacea
- Class: Insecta
- Order: Lepidoptera
- Family: Lecithoceridae
- Genus: Deltoplastis
- Species: D. cognata

Binomial name
- Deltoplastis cognata C. S. Wu & Park, 1998

Species of moth

Deltoplastis cognata is a moth in the family Lecithoceridae. It was described by Chun-Sheng Wu and Kyu-Tek Park in 1998. It is found in Sri Lanka.

The wingspan is 10–12 mm (0.39–0.47 in).
