= Philharmonia filiale =

Scientific classification
- Kingdom: Animalia
- Phylum: Arthropoda
- Clade: Pancrustacea
- Class: Insecta
- Order: Lepidoptera
- Family: Lecithoceridae
- Genus: Philharmonia
- Species: P. filiale

Binomial name
- Philharmonia filiale Gozmány, 2002

Species of moth

Philharmonia filiale is a moth in the family Lecithoceridae. It was described by László Anthony Gozmány in 2002. It is found in India.
