= Caveana diemseoki =

Scientific classification
- Kingdom: Animalia
- Phylum: Arthropoda
- Class: Insecta
- Order: Lepidoptera
- Family: Lecithoceridae
- Genus: Caveana
- Species: C. diemseoki

Binomial name
- Caveana diemseoki Park, 2010

Species of moth

Caveana diemseoki is a moth in the family Lecithoceridae. It is found in Thailand.

== Description ==
The wingspan is 14–15 mm (0.55–0.59 in).
