= Anaxyrina albicostalis =

Scientific classification
- Kingdom: Animalia
- Phylum: Arthropoda
- Clade: Pancrustacea
- Class: Insecta
- Order: Lepidoptera
- Family: Lecithoceridae
- Genus: Anaxyrina
- Species: A. albicostalis

Binomial name
- Anaxyrina albicostalis Park, 2008

Species of moth

Anaxyrina albicostalis is a moth in the family Lecithoceridae. It was described by Kyu-Tek Park in 2008. It is found in Thailand.
