= Philharmonia eurysia =

Scientific classification
- Kingdom: Animalia
- Phylum: Arthropoda
- Clade: Pancrustacea
- Class: Insecta
- Order: Lepidoptera
- Family: Lecithoceridae
- Genus: Philharmonia
- Species: P. eurysia

Binomial name
- Philharmonia eurysia Wu, 2000

Species of moth

Philharmonia eurysia is a moth in the family Lecithoceridae. It was described by Chun-Sheng Wu in 2000. It is found on Borneo.
