= Epharmonia =

Scientific classification
- Kingdom: Animalia
- Phylum: Arthropoda
- Class: Insecta
- Order: Lepidoptera
- Family: Lecithoceridae
- Subfamily: Torodorinae
- Genus: Epharmonia; Meyrick, 1925
- Species: E. ardua

Binomial name
- Epharmonia ardua (Meyrick, 1910)

Synonyms
- Oneba ardua Meyrick, 1910

Genus of moths

Epharmonia is a genus of moth in the family Lecithoceridae. It contains the species Epharmonia ardua, which is found in India (Assam).

The wingspan is 19–21 mm. The forewings are brown sprinkled with dark fuscous. The stigmata are cloudy and dark fuscous, the plical beneath the first discal, an additional dot beneath the second discal and a small spot of dark fuscous suffusion on the dorsum beneath the plical stigma, and a dot beneath the costa beyond the first discal. There is also a pale ochreous line from four-fifths of the costa to the dorsum before the tornus, indented at one-third. There is a series of blackish dots along the posterior part of the costa and termen. The hindwings are grey.
