= Dixognatha =

Scientific classification
- Kingdom: Animalia
- Phylum: Arthropoda
- Class: Insecta
- Order: Lepidoptera
- Family: Lecithoceridae
- Subfamily: Torodorinae
- Genus: Dixognatha; Wu, 2002
- Species: D. nectarus

Binomial name
- Dixognatha nectarus (Wu, 1996)

Synonyms
- Athymoris nectarus Wu, 1996

Genus of moths

Dixognatha is a genus of moths in the family Lecithoceridae. It contains the species Dixognatha nectarus, which is found in China (Sichuan).
