= Philharmonia melona =

Scientific classification
- Kingdom: Animalia
- Phylum: Arthropoda
- Clade: Pancrustacea
- Class: Insecta
- Order: Lepidoptera
- Family: Lecithoceridae
- Genus: Philharmonia
- Species: P. melona

Binomial name
- Philharmonia melona Wu, 1994

Species of moth

Philharmonia melona is a moth in the family Lecithoceridae. It was described by Chun-Sheng Wu in 1994. It is found in China.
