= Deltoplastis amicella =

Scientific classification
- Kingdom: Animalia
- Phylum: Arthropoda
- Class: Insecta
- Order: Lepidoptera
- Family: Lecithoceridae
- Genus: Deltoplastis
- Species: D. amicella

Binomial name
- Deltoplastis amicella (Walker, 1864)

Synonyms
- Gelechia amicella Walker, 1864; Gelechia obligatella Walker, 1864

Species of moth

Deltoplastis amicella is a moth in the family Lecithoceridae. It was described by Francis Walker in 1864. It is found in India (Assam), Myanmar and Sri Lanka.

The wingspan is about 12 mm. Adults are a cinereous (ash-grey) fawn colour, with narrow wings. The forewings are acute, with a large black cinereous-bordered spot on the interior border before the middle, and a short transverse streak of the same hue in the disc at two-thirds of the length. There is a blackish exterior band, which extends diffusely to the streak on the inner side, and is bordered by a slightly undulating cinereous line on the outer side. The exterior border is very oblique.
