= Deltoplastis sincera =

Scientific classification
- Domain: Eukaryota
- Kingdom: Animalia
- Phylum: Arthropoda
- Class: Insecta
- Order: Lepidoptera
- Family: Lecithoceridae
- Genus: Deltoplastis
- Species: D. sincera

Binomial name
- Deltoplastis sincera (Diakonoff, 1952)

Synonyms
- Brachmia sincera Diakonoff, 1952

Species of moth

Deltoplastis sincera is a moth in the family Lecithoceridae. It was described by Alexey Diakonoff in 1952. It is found in Burma.
