= Deltoplastis prionaspis =

Scientific classification
- Kingdom: Animalia
- Phylum: Arthropoda
- Clade: Pancrustacea
- Class: Insecta
- Order: Lepidoptera
- Family: Lecithoceridae
- Genus: Deltoplastis
- Species: D. prionaspis

Binomial name
- Deltoplastis prionaspis Gozmány, 1978

Species of moth

Deltoplastis prionaspis is a moth in the family Lecithoceridae found in China. It was described by László Anthony Gozmány in 1978.
