= Hygroplasta notolatra =

Scientific classification
- Kingdom: Animalia
- Phylum: Arthropoda
- Clade: Pancrustacea
- Class: Insecta
- Order: Lepidoptera
- Family: Lecithoceridae
- Genus: Hygroplasta
- Species: H. notolatra

Binomial name
- Hygroplasta notolatra Wu, 1998

Species of moth

Hygroplasta notolatra is a moth in the family Lecithoceridae. It was described by Chun-Sheng Wu in 1998. It is found on Borneo.
