= Eccedoxa =

Scientific classification
- Kingdom: Animalia
- Phylum: Arthropoda
- Clade: Pancrustacea
- Class: Insecta
- Order: Lepidoptera
- Family: Lecithoceridae
- Subfamily: Torodorinae
- Genus: Eccedoxa; Gozmány, 1973

Genus of moths

Eccedoxa is a genus of moth in the family Lecithoceridae.

== Species ==
- Eccedoxa lysimopa (Meyrick, 1933)
- Eccedoxa thenara Wu, 2001
