= Athymoris paramecola =

Scientific classification
- Kingdom: Animalia
- Phylum: Arthropoda
- Class: Insecta
- Order: Lepidoptera
- Family: Lecithoceridae
- Genus: Athymoris
- Species: A. paramecola

Binomial name
- Athymoris paramecola Wu, 1996

Species of moth

Athymoris paramecola is a moth in the family Lecithoceridae. It is found in China (Hainan).
