= Deltoplastis tetradelta =

Scientific classification
- Domain: Eukaryota
- Kingdom: Animalia
- Phylum: Arthropoda
- Class: Insecta
- Order: Lepidoptera
- Family: Lecithoceridae
- Genus: Deltoplastis
- Species: D. tetradelta

Binomial name
- Deltoplastis tetradelta (Meyrick, 1906)

Synonyms
- Antiochtha tetradelta Meyrick, 1906

Species of moth

Deltoplastis tetradelta is a moth in the family Lecithoceridae. It was described by Edward Meyrick in 1906. It is found in Sri Lanka.

The wingspan is about 20 mm. The forewings are pale greyish ochreous suffused with ochreous whitish. The base of the costa, and an oblique costal strigula before the middle are dark fuscous and there is a triangular dark fuscous blotch, edged with ochreous whitish, extending on the dorsum from one-fifth to beyond the middle, and reaching three-fourths of the way across the wing. There is a similar blotch extending along the costa from the middle to four-fifths, and nearly reaching to the dorsum, as well as a fine dark fuscous terminal line, shortly continued and stronger above the apex. The hindwings are light fuscous.
