= Hygroplasta canitiana =

Scientific classification
- Kingdom: Animalia
- Phylum: Arthropoda
- Clade: Pancrustacea
- Class: Insecta
- Order: Lepidoptera
- Family: Lecithoceridae
- Genus: Hygroplasta
- Species: H. canitiana

Binomial name
- Hygroplasta canitiana Wu & Park, 1998

Species of moth

Hygroplasta canitiana is a moth in the family Lecithoceridae. It was described by Chun-Sheng Wu and Kyu-Tek Park in 1998. It is found in Sri Lanka.

The wingspan is 13–15 mm.
