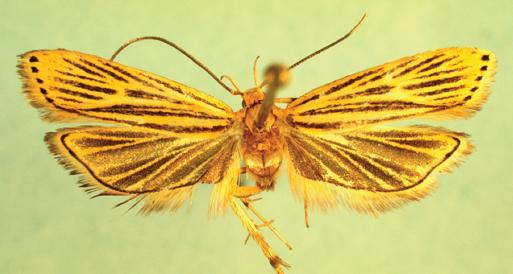

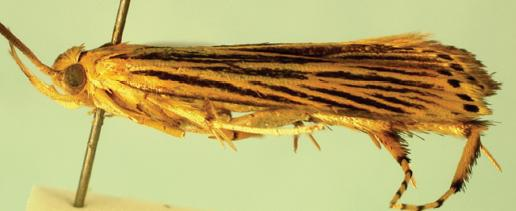

Scientific classification
- Kingdom: Animalia
- Phylum: Arthropoda
- Class: Insecta
- Order: Lepidoptera
- Family: Lecithoceridae
- Genus: Caveana
- Species: C. senuri

Binomial name
- Caveana senuri Park, 2013

= Caveana senuri =

Species of moth

Caveana senuri is a moth in the family Lecithoceridae. It is found in Taiwan.

== Description ==
The wingspan is 17–18 mm. The forewings are light orange, clothed with dark-brown scales between veins. The hindwings are evenly clothed with dark-brown scales and light orange along veins.

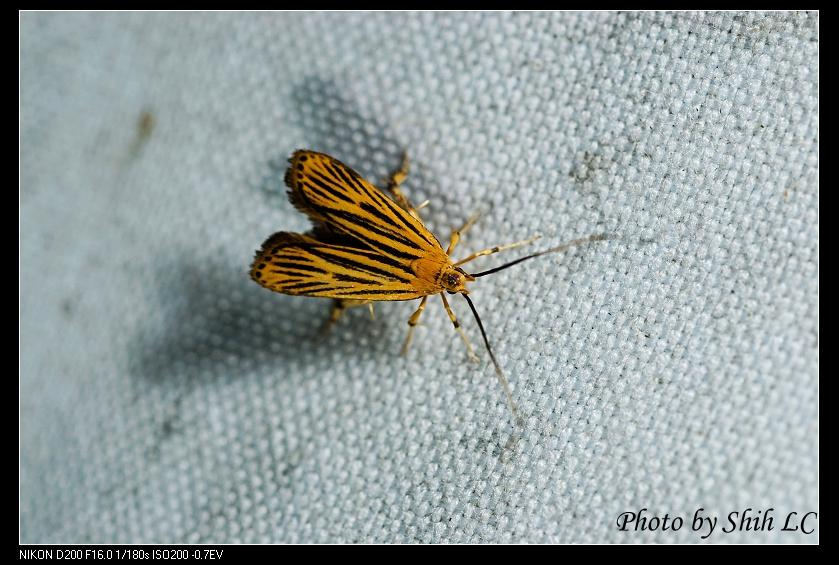

== Etymology ==
The specific name is derived from the Korean term senuri (meaning a new country).
