= Chrysonasma =

Scientific classification
- Kingdom: Animalia
- Phylum: Arthropoda
- Class: Insecta
- Order: Lepidoptera
- Family: Lecithoceridae
- Subfamily: Torodorinae
- Genus: Chrysonasma; Park, 2008

Genus of moths

Chrysonasma is a genus of moths in the family Lecithoceridae.

== Species ==
- Chrysonasma cassiterota (Meyrick, 1923)
- Chrysonasma caliginosa Park and Byun, 2008

== Etymology ==
The generic name is derived from Greek chrysos (meaning gold) and nasmos (meaning stream).
