= Heppneralis decorella =

Scientific classification
- Kingdom: Animalia
- Phylum: Arthropoda
- Clade: Pancrustacea
- Class: Insecta
- Order: Lepidoptera
- Family: Lecithoceridae
- Genus: Heppneralis
- Species: H. decorella

Binomial name
- Heppneralis decorella Park, 2013

Species of moth

Heppneralis decorella is a moth in the family Lecithoceridae. It was described by Kyu-Tek Park in 2013. It is found in northern Sulawesi in Indonesia.

The wingspan is 17–18 mm (0.67–0.71 in) for males.
