= Anaxyrina =

Scientific classification
- Kingdom: Animalia
- Phylum: Arthropoda
- Clade: Pancrustacea
- Class: Insecta
- Order: Lepidoptera
- Family: Lecithoceridae
- Subfamily: Torodorinae
- Genus: Anaxyrina; Meyrick, 1918

Genus of moths

Anaxyrina is a genus of moths in the family Lecithoceridae.

== Species ==
- Anaxyrina albicostalis Park, 2008
- Anaxyrina cyanopa Meyrick, 1918
