= Deltoplastis balanitis =

Scientific classification
- Domain: Eukaryota
- Kingdom: Animalia
- Phylum: Arthropoda
- Class: Insecta
- Order: Lepidoptera
- Family: Lecithoceridae
- Genus: Deltoplastis
- Species: D. balanitis

Binomial name
- Deltoplastis balanitis (Meyrick, 1910)

Synonyms
- Onebala balanitis Meyrick, 1910

Species of moth

Deltoplastis balanitis is a moth in the family Lecithoceridae. It was described by Edward Meyrick in 1910. It is found in southern India.

The wingspan is 26–27 mm. The forewings are fuscous partially tinged with whitish ochreous and with a small blackish-fuscous spot on the base of the costa, as well as a blackish-fuscous blotch extending along the dorsum from one-sixth to three-fifths, anteriorly rounded and reaching half way across the wing, narrowed to a point posteriorly, edged with ochreous whitish. The first discal stigma is indicated by a small round blackish-fuscous spot resting on this. There are two blackish-fuscous dots on the transverse vein, partially whitish edged. There is also a blackish-fuscous triangular blotch with the apex touching these dots, the base rather near and parallel to the termen, edged posteriorly by a band of whitish-ochreous suffusion. There is a dark fuscous terminal line. The hindwings are fuscous, anteriorly paler and tinged with whitish ochreous.
