= Anaxyrina cyanopa =

Scientific classification
- Kingdom: Animalia
- Phylum: Arthropoda
- Class: Insecta
- Order: Lepidoptera
- Family: Lecithoceridae
- Genus: Anaxyrina
- Species: A. cyanopa

Binomial name
- Anaxyrina cyanopa Meyrick, 1918

Species of moth

Anaxyrina cyanopa is a moth in the family Lecithoceridae. It was described by Edward Meyrick in 1918. It is found in southern India.

The wingspan is 12–13 mm. The forewings are ochreous-whitish, with the markings light fuscous irrorated black. There is a small spot on the base of the costa and a slender irregular sometimes incomplete transverse fascia near the base. A broad irregular fascia runs parallel to the termen before the middle, closely followed by a narrower irregular metallic-indigo-blue fascia edged black. There is a semi-oval blotch on the dorsum at two-thirds and a broad posterior light brownish band irrorated blackish on the lower half, leaving a narrow streak of groundcolour around the apex and termen, marked with three white dots on the costa and sprinkled white towards the costa posteriorly. The hindwings are pale grey.
