= Deltoplastis commodata =

Scientific classification
- Domain: Eukaryota
- Kingdom: Animalia
- Phylum: Arthropoda
- Class: Insecta
- Order: Lepidoptera
- Family: Lecithoceridae
- Genus: Deltoplastis
- Species: D. commodata

Binomial name
- Deltoplastis commodata (Meyrick, 1923)

Synonyms
- Onebala commodata Meyrick, 1923

Species of moth

Deltoplastis commodata is a moth in the family Lecithoceridae. It was described by Edward Meyrick in 1923. It is found in Sri Lanka.

The wingspan is about 15 mm. The forewings are rather dark bronzy fuscous with an obscure cloudy whitish transverse line at two-fifths, the ground colour rather darker before it. There is a slight cloudy whitish transverse mark on the costa at two-fifths, and a pre-tornal dot opposite and sometimes some faint whitish speckling towards the termen. There is a black marginal line around the apical part of the costa and termen, thicker on the costa. The hindwings are grey.
