= Athymoris subtrigona =

Scientific classification
- Kingdom: Animalia
- Phylum: Arthropoda
- Class: Insecta
- Order: Lepidoptera
- Family: Lecithoceridae
- Genus: Athymoris
- Species: A. subtrigona

Binomial name
- Athymoris subtrigona Park, 2000

Species of moth

Athymoris subtrigona is a moth in the family Lecithoceridae. It is endemic to Taiwan.

The wingspan is 16–17 mm.
