= Coproptilia glebicolorella =

Scientific classification
- Domain: Eukaryota
- Kingdom: Animalia
- Phylum: Arthropoda
- Class: Insecta
- Order: Lepidoptera
- Family: Lecithoceridae
- Genus: Coproptilia
- Species: C. glebicolorella

Binomial name
- Coproptilia glebicolorella Snellen, 1903

Species of moth

Coproptilia glebicolorella is a moth in the family Lecithoceridae. It was described by Pieter Cornelius Tobias Snellen in 1903. It is found on Sumatra and western Java.

The wingspan is 16–25 mm. The forewings are clay brown, with slightly lighter veins and ill-defined blackish-brown streaks in the cells at the base. The hindwings are greyer than the forewings up to half, then become the same colour as the forewings.
