= Deltoplastis apostatis =

Scientific classification
- Domain: Eukaryota
- Kingdom: Animalia
- Phylum: Arthropoda
- Class: Insecta
- Order: Lepidoptera
- Family: Lecithoceridae
- Genus: Deltoplastis
- Species: D. apostatis

Binomial name
- Deltoplastis apostatis (Meyrick, 1932)

Synonyms
- Lecithocera apostatis Meyrick, 1932

Species of moth

Deltoplastis apostatis is a moth in the family Lecithoceridae. It was described by Edward Meyrick in 1932. It is found in Japan.
