= Athymoris martialis =

Scientific classification
- Domain: Eukaryota
- Kingdom: Animalia
- Phylum: Arthropoda
- Class: Insecta
- Order: Lepidoptera
- Family: Lecithoceridae
- Genus: Athymoris
- Species: A. martialis

Binomial name
- Athymoris martialis Meyrick, 1935

Species of moth

Athymoris martialis is a moth in the family Lecithoceridae. It is found in Taiwan, southern China, Korea, and Japan.
