= Notialis stigmatis =

Scientific classification
- Kingdom: Animalia
- Phylum: Arthropoda
- Clade: Pancrustacea
- Class: Insecta
- Order: Lepidoptera
- Family: Lycaenidae
- Genus: Notialis
- Species: N. stigmatis

Binomial name
- Notialis stigmatis Park, 2009

Species of moth

Notialis stigmatis is a moth in the family Lecithoceridae. It was described by Kyu-Tek Park in 2009. It is found in Palawan in the Philippines.
