= Deltoplastis coercita =

Scientific classification
- Domain: Eukaryota
- Kingdom: Animalia
- Phylum: Arthropoda
- Class: Insecta
- Order: Lepidoptera
- Family: Lecithoceridae
- Genus: Deltoplastis
- Species: D. coercita

Binomial name
- Deltoplastis coercita (Meyrick, 1923)

Synonyms
- Onebala coercita Meyrick, 1923

Species of moth

Deltoplastis coercita is a moth in the family Lecithoceridae. It was described by Edward Meyrick in 1923. It is found in southern India.

The wingspan is 12–13 mm. The forewings are violet fuscous, slightly whitish sprinkled, with a broad streak of blackish-fuscous suffusion on the basal fourth of the costa, posteriorly suffused and undefined. There is an irregular-edged triangular blackish-fuscous white-edged patch extending on the dorsum from the base to the middle, the apex reaching two-thirds across the wing near before the middle, the space between this and the costal streak is suffused with whitish. There is a very oblique blackish white-edged strigula on the costa before the middle, the second discal stigma forming a small blackish white-edged spot, sometimes a smaller similar spot beneath it. There is a suffused dark fuscous subterminal fascia of which the discal portion is expanded into a broad blotch reaching the second discal stigma, edged beneath and posteriorly by white scales, a small white mark on the costa preceding this. There is also a blackish terminal line. The hindwings are light grey, thinly scaled and whitish tinged anteriorly.
