= Triviola =

Scientific classification
- Kingdom: Animalia
- Phylum: Arthropoda
- Class: Insecta
- Order: Lepidoptera
- Family: Lecithoceridae
- Subfamily: Torodorinae
- Genus: Triviola; Park, 2010
- Species: T. puiensis

Binomial name
- Triviola puiensis Park, 2010

Genus of moths

Triviola is a genus of moths in the family Lecithoceridae. It contains the sole species Triviola puiensis, which is found in Thailand.

== Description ==
The wingspan is 13.5–14.5 mm (0.53–0.57 in).
