= Deltoplastis caduca =

Scientific classification
- Domain: Eukaryota
- Kingdom: Animalia
- Phylum: Arthropoda
- Class: Insecta
- Order: Lepidoptera
- Family: Lecithoceridae
- Genus: Deltoplastis
- Species: D. caduca

Binomial name
- Deltoplastis caduca (Meyrick, 1910)

Synonyms
- Onebala caduca Meyrick, 1910

Species of moth

Deltoplastis caduca is a moth in the family Lecithoceridae. It was described by Edward Meyrick in 1910. It is found in Assam, India.

The wingspan is 14–15 mm. The forewings are whitish ochreous with a blackish-fuscous mark along the costa at the base and a very oblique trapezoidal blackish-fuscous blotch extending on the dorsum from near the base to two-fifths, and reaching rather beyond the fold, in males reduced to an elongate spot above the fold. There is a very oblique black strigula from the costa before the middle and a blackish-fuscous pale-edged mark on the transverse vein, the upper end enlarged, in females surrounded with some undefined fuscous suffusion. There is a somewhat sinuate ochreous-whitish line from five-sixths of the costa to the tornus, edged anteriorly with dark fuscous suffusion enlarged in the disc into a triangular patch almost reaching the preceding mark. A blackish line is found around the apex and termen. The hindwings are light grey, tinged with yellowish.
