= Philharmonia adusta =

Scientific classification
- Domain: Eukaryota
- Kingdom: Animalia
- Phylum: Arthropoda
- Class: Insecta
- Order: Lepidoptera
- Family: Lecithoceridae
- Genus: Philharmonia
- Species: P. adusta

Binomial name
- Philharmonia adusta Park, 2000

Species of moth

Philharmonia adusta is a moth in the family Lecithoceridae. It is found in Taiwan.
