= Hygroplasta parviella =

Scientific classification
- Kingdom: Animalia
- Phylum: Arthropoda
- Clade: Pancrustacea
- Class: Insecta
- Order: Lepidoptera
- Family: Lecithoceridae
- Genus: Hygroplasta
- Species: H. parviella

Binomial name
- Hygroplasta parviella Park, 2003

Species of moth

Hygroplasta parviella is a moth in the family Lecithoceridae. It was described by Kyu-Tek Park in 2003. It is found in Thailand.
