= Athymoris liukueiensis =

Scientific classification
- Kingdom: Animalia
- Phylum: Arthropoda
- Class: Insecta
- Order: Lepidoptera
- Family: Lecithoceridae
- Genus: Athymoris
- Species: A. liukueiensis

Binomial name
- Athymoris liukueiensis Park, 2000

Species of moth

Athymoris liukueiensis is a moth in the family Lecithoceridae. It is endemic to Taiwan.

The wingspan is 18–19 mm.

== Etymology ==
The species name refers to the type locality.
