= Deltoplastis scopulosa =

Scientific classification
- Domain: Eukaryota
- Kingdom: Animalia
- Phylum: Arthropoda
- Class: Insecta
- Order: Lepidoptera
- Family: Lecithoceridae
- Genus: Deltoplastis
- Species: D. scopulosa

Binomial name
- Deltoplastis scopulosa (Meyrick, 1910)

Synonyms
- Onebala scopulosa Meyrick, 1910

Species of moth

Deltoplastis scopulosa is a moth in the family Lecithoceridae. It was described by Edward Meyrick in 1910. It is found in southern India.

The wingspan is 14–15 mm. The forewings are ochreous grey, sometimes much suffused with whitish, especially towards the costa. There is a small blackish mark on the base of the costa and a rounded-triangular blackish blotch edged with whitish extending on the dorsum from one-fifth to beyond the middle, and reaching four-fifths across the wing. There is an oblique black white-edged strigula from the middle of costa and a rounded triangular dark fuscous blotch crossing the wing posteriorly, its base formed by a whitish line from five-sixths of the costa to the tornus, its lower side margined by a curved whitish line preceded by a blackish line, of which the extremity is somewhat enlarged to indicate the second discal stigma, edged anteriorly with whitish on the transverse vein. A black line is found on the apical portion of the costa. The hindwings are grey, darker posteriorly.
