= Eccedoxa thenara =

Scientific classification
- Kingdom: Animalia
- Phylum: Arthropoda
- Clade: Pancrustacea
- Class: Insecta
- Order: Lepidoptera
- Family: Lecithoceridae
- Genus: Eccedoxa
- Species: E. thenara

Binomial name
- Eccedoxa thenara Wu, 2001

Species of moth

Eccedoxa thenara is a moth in the family Lecithoceridae. It was described by Chun-Sheng Wu in 2001. It is found in Sri Lanka.
