= Athymoris dibaliodes =

Scientific classification
- Domain: Eukaryota
- Kingdom: Animalia
- Phylum: Arthropoda
- Class: Insecta
- Order: Lepidoptera
- Family: Lecithoceridae
- Genus: Athymoris
- Species: A. dibaliodes

Binomial name
- Athymoris dibaliodes Park, 2010

Species of moth

Athymoris dibaliodes is a moth in the family Lecithoceridae. It is found in Thailand.
