= Philharmonia insigna =

Scientific classification
- Kingdom: Animalia
- Phylum: Arthropoda
- Clade: Pancrustacea
- Class: Insecta
- Order: Lepidoptera
- Family: Lecithoceridae
- Genus: Philharmonia
- Species: P. insigna

Binomial name
- Philharmonia insigna Wu & Park, 1999

Species of moth

Philharmonia insigna is a moth in the family Lecithoceridae. It was described by Chun-Sheng Wu and Kyu-Tek Park in 1999. It is found in Sri Lanka.
