= Hygroplasta lygaea =

Scientific classification
- Domain: Eukaryota
- Kingdom: Animalia
- Phylum: Arthropoda
- Class: Insecta
- Order: Lepidoptera
- Family: Lecithoceridae
- Genus: Hygroplasta
- Species: H. lygaea

Binomial name
- Hygroplasta lygaea (Meyrick, 1911)

Synonyms
- Pachnistis lygaea Meyrick, 1911

Species of moth

Hygroplasta lygaea is a moth in the family Lecithoceridae. It was described by Edward Meyrick in 1911. It is found in Kashmir and Nepal.

The wingspan is about 24 mm. The forewings are rather dark purplish bronzy fuscous with the discal stigmata rather small, cloudy and blackish. The hindwings are dark fuscous.
