= Deltoplastis straminicornis =

Scientific classification
- Domain: Eukaryota
- Kingdom: Animalia
- Phylum: Arthropoda
- Class: Insecta
- Order: Lepidoptera
- Family: Lecithoceridae
- Genus: Deltoplastis
- Species: D. straminicornis

Binomial name
- Deltoplastis straminicornis (Meyrick, 1910)

Synonyms
- Onebala straminicornis Meyrick, 1910

Species of moth

Deltoplastis straminicornis is a moth in the family Lecithoceridae. It was described by Edward Meyrick in 1910. It is found in Sri Lanka.

The wingspan is 18–20 mm. The forewings are rather dark purple fuscous, in males somewhat mixed with pale ochreous suffusion towards the costal area between one-fourth and three-fourths. There is a triangular blackish-fuscous blotch obscurely edged with pale ochreous, extending on the dorsum from one-fourth to the middle, and reaching three-fourths across the wing. An indistinct small oblique blackish-fuscous mark is found on the middle of the costa and a narrow transverse blackish-fuscous spot on the transverse vein, obscurely pale edged, the upper end enlarged. There is an indistinct slender pale ochreous line from five-sixths of the costa to the dorsum before the tornus, preceded by an undefined fascia of blackish-fuscous suffusion dilated in the disc so as to reach the preceding spot. The hindwings are fuscous.
