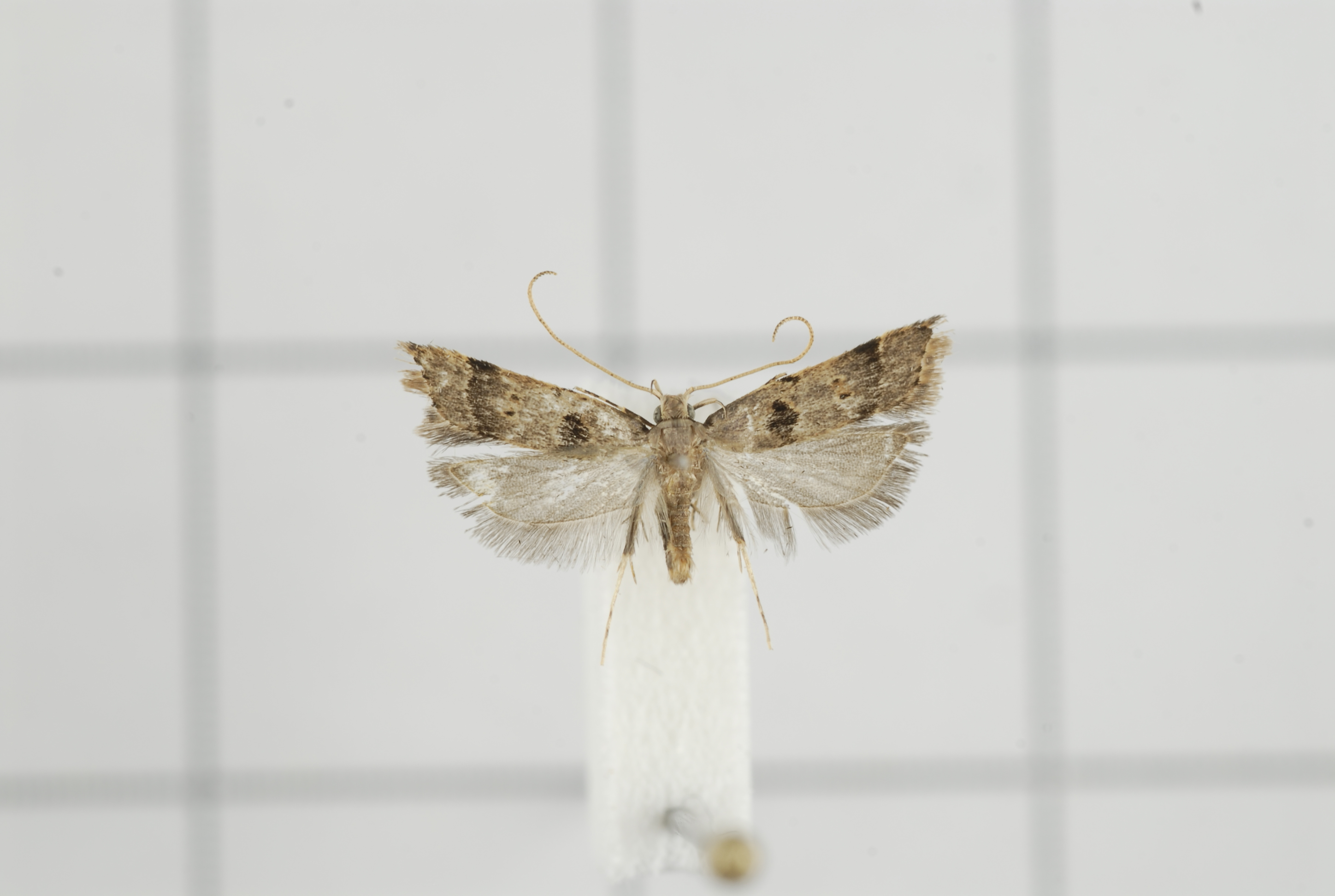

Scientific classification
- Kingdom: Animalia
- Phylum: Arthropoda
- Clade: Pancrustacea
- Class: Insecta
- Order: Lepidoptera
- Family: Lecithoceridae
- Genus: Deltoplastis
- Species: D. lobigera

Binomial name
- Deltoplastis lobigera Gozmány, 1978

= Deltoplastis lobigera =

Species of moth

Deltoplastis lobigera is a moth in the family Lecithoceridae. It is found in Taiwan, the provinces of Zhejiang, Hubei and Sichuan in China, and in Vietnam. Its type locality is Tianmushan in Zhejiang. In Taiwan it has been recorded at elevations of 50–1,450 m (160–4,760 ft) above sea level.

== Description ==
The wingspan is 12.5–15 mm.
