= Hygroplasta continctella =

Scientific classification
- Kingdom: Animalia
- Phylum: Arthropoda
- Class: Insecta
- Order: Lepidoptera
- Family: Lecithoceridae
- Genus: Hygroplasta
- Species: H. continctella

Binomial name
- Hygroplasta continctella (Walker, 1864)

Synonyms
- Depressaria continctella Walker, 1864

Species of moth

Hygroplasta continctella is a moth in the family Lecithoceridae. It was described by Francis Walker in 1864. It is found in southern India.

Adults are cinereous brown and stout, with the forewings rather narrow, rounded at the tips, with two deep black dots in the disc, one before the middle, the other beyond the middle. The hindwings are cinereous.
