= Deltoplastis causidica =

Scientific classification
- Domain: Eukaryota
- Kingdom: Animalia
- Phylum: Arthropoda
- Class: Insecta
- Order: Lepidoptera
- Family: Lecithoceridae
- Genus: Deltoplastis
- Species: D. causidica

Binomial name
- Deltoplastis causidica (Meyrick, 1910)

Synonyms
- Onebala causidica Meyrick, 1910

Species of moth

Deltoplastis causidica is a moth in the family Lecithoceridae. It was described by Edward Meyrick in 1910. It is found in Assam, India.

The wingspan is about 20 mm. The forewings are fuscous sprinkled with whitish, the basal and costal areas more or less wholly suffused with whitish ochreous. There is a blackish-fuscous spot on the base of the costa and two large trapezoidal blackish-fuscous blotches edged with whitish, the first extending on the dorsum from one-sixth to the middle, one angle almost reaching the costa at one-third, the other on the submedian fold, the second blotch with its anterior angles adjacent to a curved blackish-fuscous whitish-edged spot on the transverse vein, the posterior angles resting on the costa at five-sixths and the dorsum before the tornus. The hindwings are rather dark grey.
