= Deltoplastis propensa =

Scientific classification
- Domain: Eukaryota
- Kingdom: Animalia
- Phylum: Arthropoda
- Class: Insecta
- Order: Lepidoptera
- Family: Lecithoceridae
- Genus: Deltoplastis
- Species: D. propensa

Binomial name
- Deltoplastis propensa (Meyrick, 1910)

Synonyms
- Onebala propensa Meyrick, 1910

Species of moth

Deltoplastis propensa is a moth in the family Lecithoceridae. It was described by Edward Meyrick in 1910. It is found in Sri Lanka.

The wingspan is about 20 mm. The forewings are grey, slightly violet tinged, somewhat sprinkled with whitish and with the costal edge ochreous whitish from one-third to four-fifths. There is a small oblique dark fuscous mark on the costa at two-fifths, and a transverse spot of fuscous suffusion from the dorsum opposite reaching half way across the wing, both edged posteriorly with whitish. The discal stigmata are dark fuscous, slightly whitish edged, an additional similar dot beneath and slightly beyond the second discal and an almost straight slender white line from four-fifths of the costa to the dorsum before the tornus, as well as a black line around the apex and termen. The hindwings are grey, tinged with ochreous yellowish.
