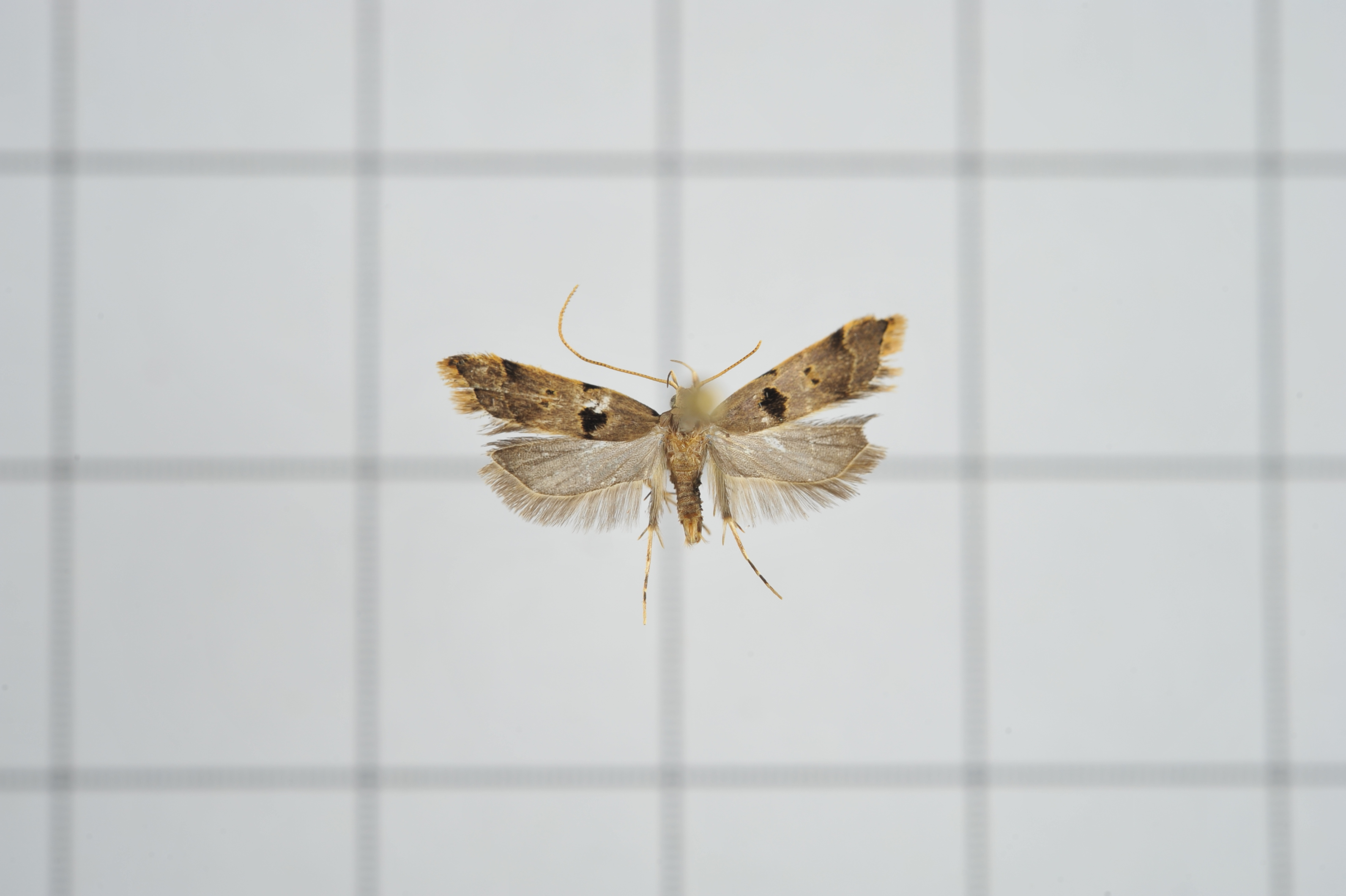

Scientific classification
- Kingdom: Animalia
- Phylum: Arthropoda
- Clade: Pancrustacea
- Class: Insecta
- Order: Lepidoptera
- Family: Lecithoceridae
- Genus: Deltoplastis
- Species: D. ovatella

Binomial name
- Deltoplastis ovatella Park & Heppner, 2001

= Deltoplastis ovatella =

Species of moth

Deltoplastis ovatella is a moth in the family Lecithoceridae. It is endemic to Taiwan. The type series was collected from Kuangwu Forest Station (Hsinchu County) at 2,000 m (6,600 ft) above sea level.
