= Eccedoxa lysimopa =

Scientific classification
- Kingdom: Animalia
- Phylum: Arthropoda
- Class: Insecta
- Order: Lepidoptera
- Family: Lecithoceridae
- Genus: Eccedoxa
- Species: E. lysimopa

Binomial name
- Eccedoxa lysimopa (Meyrick, 1933)

Synonyms
- Cophomantis lysimopa Meyrick, 1933

Species of moth

Eccedoxa lysimopa is a moth in the family Lecithoceridae. It was described by Edward Meyrick in 1933. It is found in southern India.
