= Hygroplasta monodryas =

Scientific classification
- Kingdom: Animalia
- Phylum: Arthropoda
- Class: Insecta
- Order: Lepidoptera
- Family: Lecithoceridae
- Genus: Hygroplasta
- Species: H. monodryas

Binomial name
- Hygroplasta monodryas (Meyrick, 1914)

Synonyms
- Pachnistis monodryas Meyrick, 1914

Species of moth

Hygroplasta monodryas is a moth in the family Lecithoceridae. It was described by Edward Meyrick in 1914. It is found in southern India.

The wingspan is 24–27 mm. The forewings are rather glossy ochreous fuscous, with a faint purple tinge. The hindwings are rather light fuscous.
