= Hygroplasta merinxa =

Scientific classification
- Kingdom: Animalia
- Phylum: Arthropoda
- Clade: Pancrustacea
- Class: Insecta
- Order: Lepidoptera
- Family: Lecithoceridae
- Genus: Hygroplasta
- Species: H. merinxa

Binomial name
- Hygroplasta merinxa Wu & Park, 1998

Species of moth

Hygroplasta merinxa is a moth in the family Lecithoceridae. It was described by Chun-Sheng Wu and Kyu-Tek Park in 1998. It is found in Sri Lanka.

The wingspan is 13–15 mm.

== Etymology ==
The species name is derived from Greek merinx (meaning bristle).
