= Notialis =

Scientific classification
- Domain: Eukaryota
- Kingdom: Animalia
- Phylum: Arthropoda
- Class: Insecta
- Order: Lepidoptera
- Family: Lycaenidae
- Genus: Notialis; Park in Park & Kim, 2009

Genus of moths

Notialis is a genus of moths in the family Lecithoceridae.

== Species ==
- Notialis stigmatis Park, 2009
- Notialis vernaculae Park, 2009
