= Cubitomoris =

Scientific classification
- Kingdom: Animalia
- Phylum: Arthropoda
- Clade: Pancrustacea
- Class: Insecta
- Order: Lepidoptera
- Family: Lecithoceridae
- Subfamily: Torodorinae
- Genus: Cubitomoris; Gozmány in Amsel et al., 1978
- Species: C. aechmobola

Binomial name
- Cubitomoris aechmobola (Meyrick, 1935)

Synonyms
- Lecithocera aechmobola Meyrick, 1935; Athymoris aechmobola

Genus of moths

Cubitomoris aechmobola is a moth in the family Lecithoceridae and the only species in the genus Cubitomoris. It is found in southern China.
