= List of lymantriid genera: E =

The large moth subfamily Lymantriinae contains the following genera beginning with E:

- Eala
- Eloria
- Eopirga
- Epeuproctis
- Erika
- Etobema
- Euproctidion
- Euproctis
- Euproctoides
- Euzora
