= Eala =

Eala or EALA may refer to:

- Éala (given name), an Irish feminine given name
- Eala (moth), a genus of moths
- Eala (surname), a Filipino surname (includes list of name-holders)
- Eala Botanical Garden in the city of Mbandaka in the Democratic Republic of the Congo
- East African Legislative Assembly, part of an intergovernmental organisation in East Africa

== See also ==
- Danger Close Games, an American video game developer formerly named EA Los Angeles
