= Eloria noyesi =

Coca tussock moth

Scientific classification
- Domain: Eukaryota
- Kingdom: Animalia
- Phylum: Arthropoda
- Class: Insecta
- Order: Lepidoptera
- Superfamily: Noctuoidea
- Family: Erebidae
- Genus: Eloria
- Species: E. noyesi

Binomial name
- Eloria noyesi Schaus, 1927

Species of moth

Eloria noyesi, the coca tussock moth, is a moth of the subfamily Lymantriinae first described by William Schaus in 1927. It is beige and its larvae feed on coca plants. It is found mostly in Peru and Colombia. The government of Colombia has proposed a plan to release large numbers of these moths to destroy the coca crops in their country.
