= Ruanda (moth) =

Scientific classification
- Domain: Eukaryota
- Kingdom: Animalia
- Phylum: Arthropoda
- Class: Insecta
- Order: Lepidoptera
- Superfamily: Noctuoidea
- Family: Erebidae
- Subfamily: Lymantriinae
- Tribe: Locharnini
- Genus: Ruanda; Strand, 1909

Genus of moths

Ruanda is a genus of moths in the subfamily Lymantriinae. The genus was described by Strand in 1909.

== Species ==
- Ruanda aetheria Strand, 1909
- Ruanda celaenogyia (Collenette, 1936)
- Ruanda eleuteriopsis Hering, 1926
- Ruanda furva (Hampson, 1905)
- Ruanda nuda (Holland, 1897)
