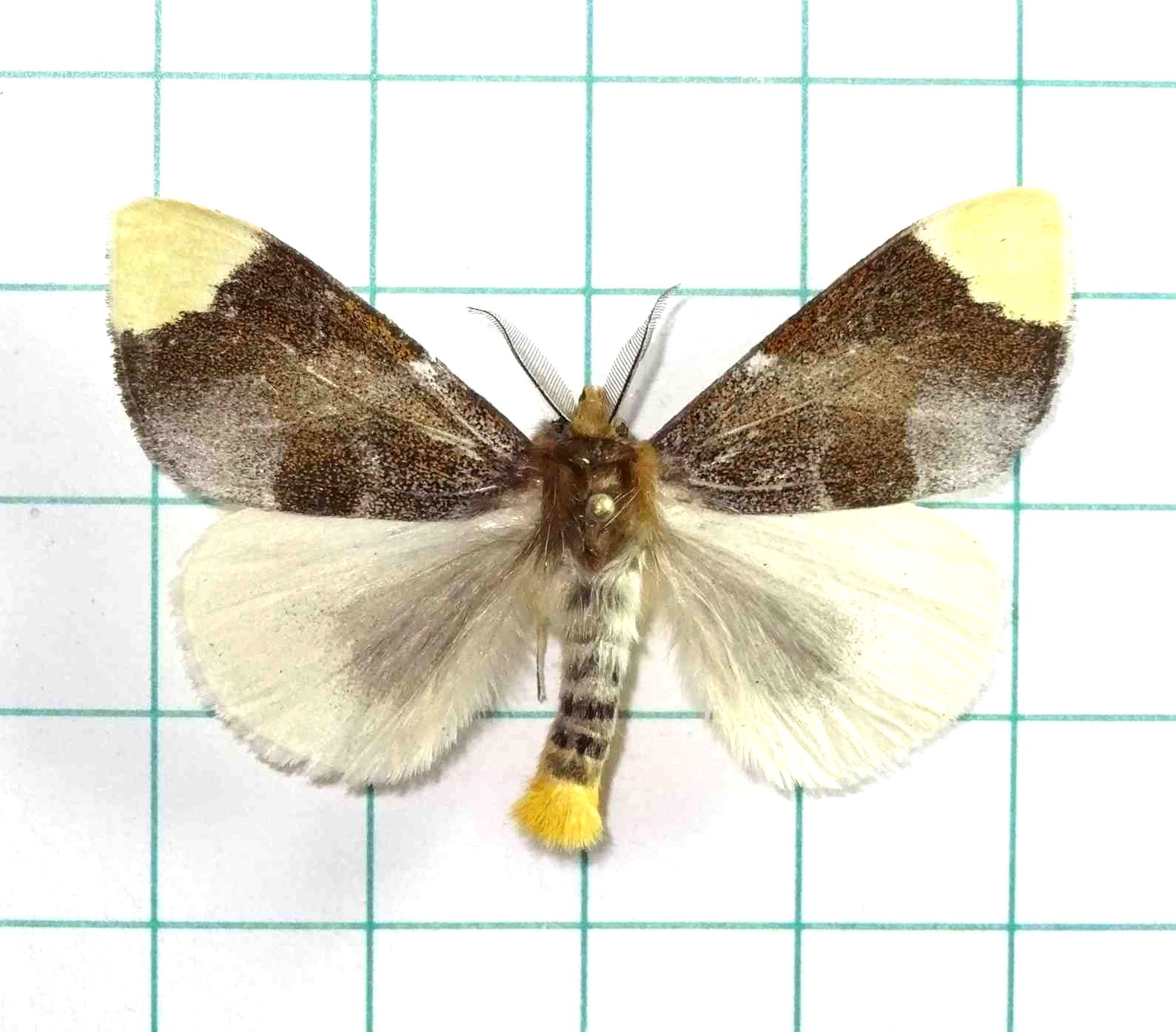
- Pida postalba

Scientific classification
- Domain: Eukaryota
- Kingdom: Animalia
- Phylum: Arthropoda
- Class: Insecta
- Order: Lepidoptera
- Superfamily: Noctuoidea
- Family: Erebidae
- Tribe: Locharnini
- Genus: Pida; Walker, 1865

Synonyms
- Mardara Walker, 1865 (Preocc.); Dokuga Matsumura, 1927; Ramadra Nye, 1980

= Pida (moth) =

Genus of moths

Pida is a genus of moths in the subfamily Lymantriinae. The genus was erected by Francis Walker in 1865, and including members of the former genus Ramadra.

== Species ==
- Pida albostriata (Hampson, [1893])
- Pida apicalis Walker, 1865
- Pida calligramma (Walker, 1865)
- Pida decolorata (Walker, 1869)
- Pida dianensis Chao, 1985
- Pida flavopica Chao, 1985
- Pida minensis Chao, 1985
- Pida patrana (Moore, 1859)
- Pida pica Chao, 1985
- Pida pilodes (Collenette, 1935)
- Pida postalba Wileman, 1910
- Pida rufa Chao, 1987
- Pida yunnana (Collenette, 1951)
