= Peloroses =

Peloroses praestans

Scientific classification
- Kingdom: Animalia
- Phylum: Arthropoda
- Clade: Pancrustacea
- Class: Insecta
- Order: Lepidoptera
- Superfamily: Noctuoidea
- Family: Erebidae
- Subfamily: Lymantriinae
- Tribe: Locharnini
- Genus: Peloroses; Collenette, 1955
- Species: P. praestans

Binomial name
- Peloroses praestans (Saalmüller, 1884)

Synonyms
- Numenes praestans Saalmüller, 1884; Numenes chelonia Le Cerf, 1921; Numenes aurantiaca Oberthür, 1923

Genus of moths

Peloroses is a genus of moths in the family Erebidae. It is monotypic, being represented by the single species, Peloroses praestans.
