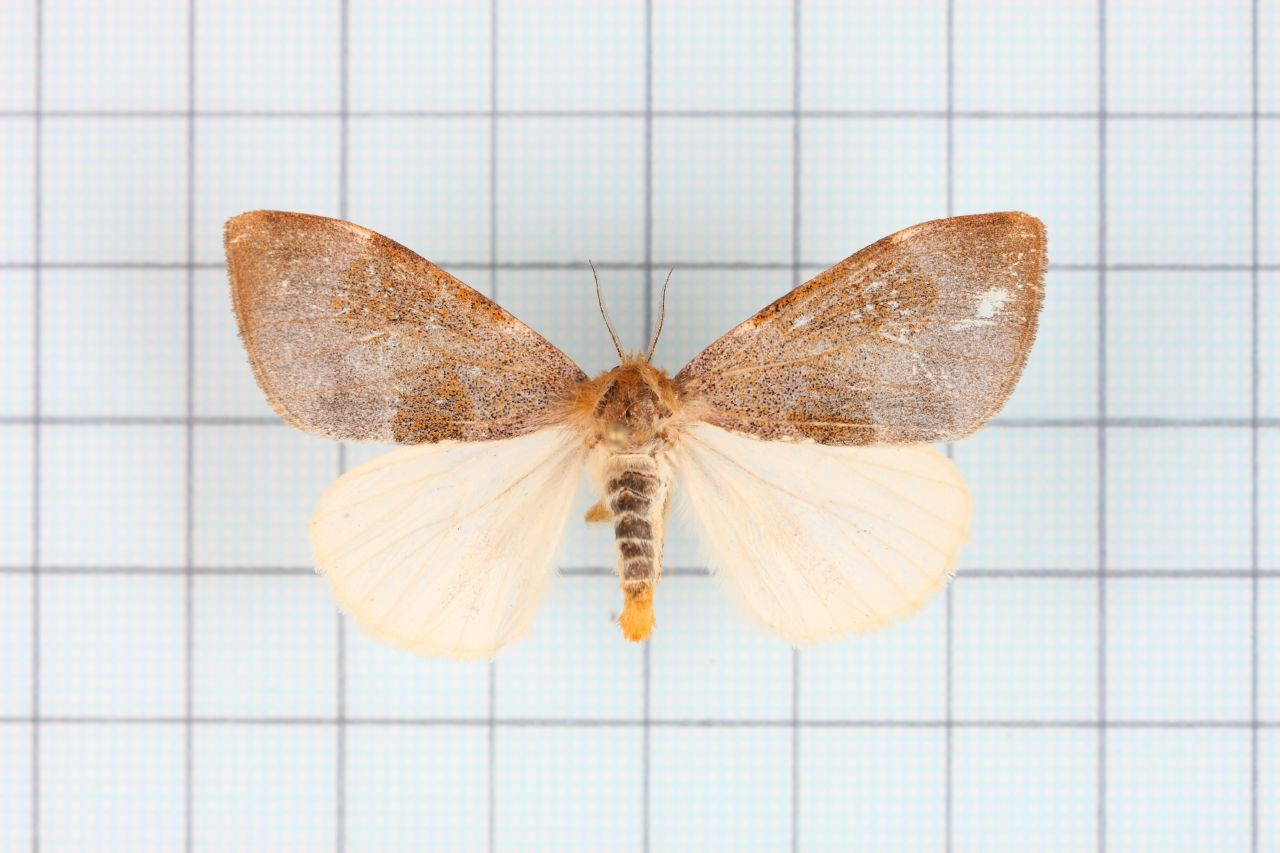

Scientific classification
- Domain: Eukaryota
- Kingdom: Animalia
- Phylum: Arthropoda
- Class: Insecta
- Order: Lepidoptera
- Superfamily: Noctuoidea
- Family: Erebidae
- Genus: Pida
- Species: P. postalba

Binomial name
- Pida postalba Wileman, 1910

Synonyms
- Dokuga purpurescens Matsumura, 1927

= Pida postalba =

Species of moth

Pida postalba is a species of moth of the subfamily Lymantriinae first described by Wileman in 1910. It is found in Taiwan.
