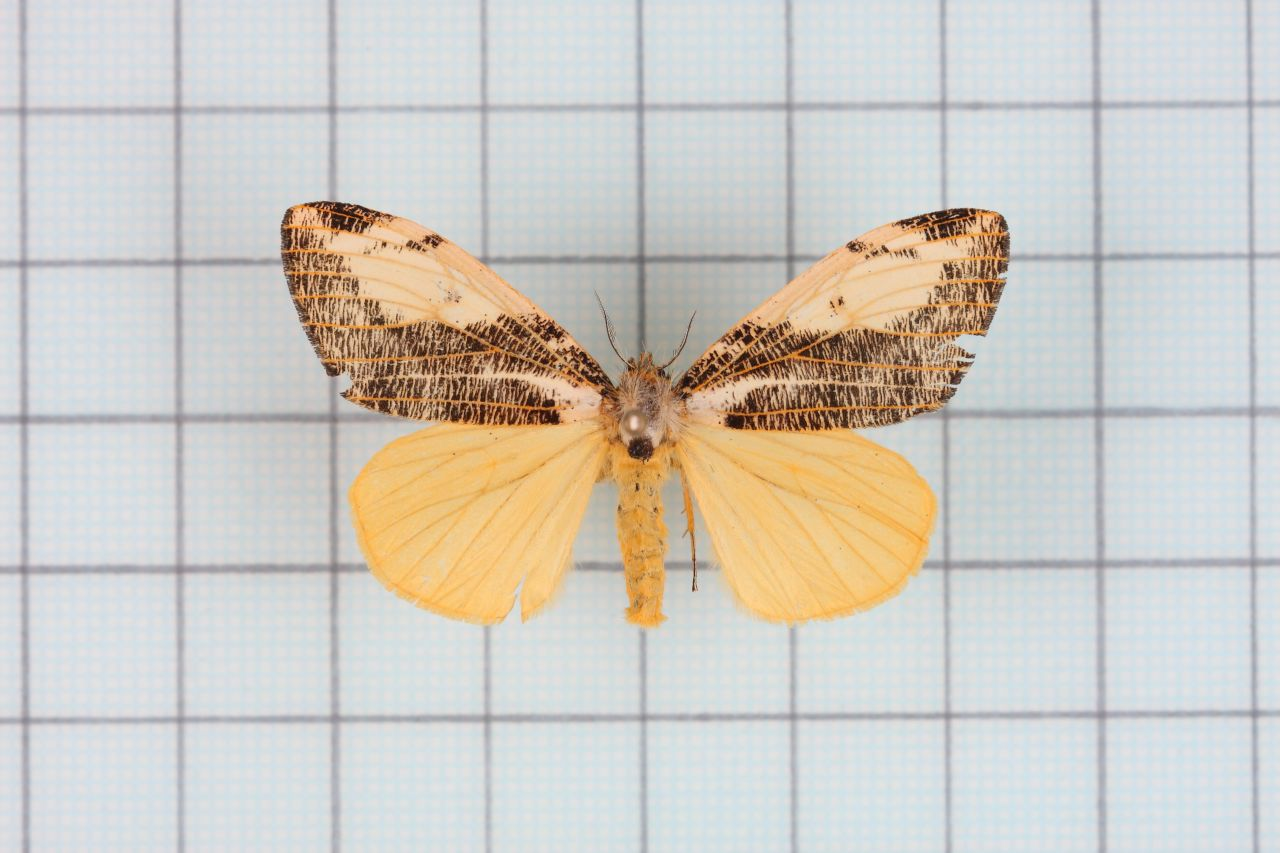
- Female
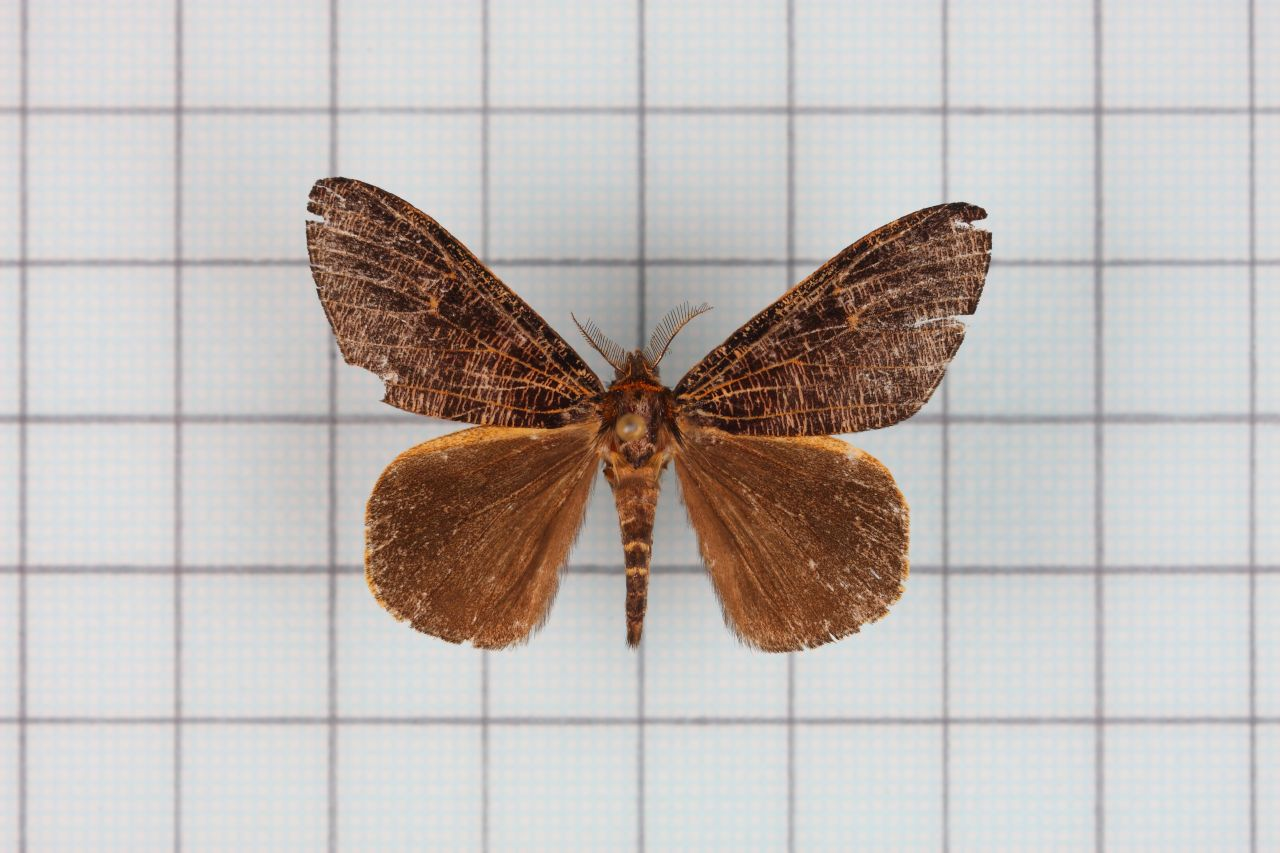
- Male

Scientific classification
- Domain: Eukaryota
- Kingdom: Animalia
- Phylum: Arthropoda
- Class: Insecta
- Order: Lepidoptera
- Superfamily: Noctuoidea
- Family: Erebidae
- Genus: Locharna
- Species: L. strigipennis

Binomial name
- Locharna strigipennis Moore, 1879

Synonyms
- Pida strigipennis

= Locharna strigipennis =

Species of moth

Locharna strigipennis is a moth in the family Erebidae first described by Frederic Moore in 1879. It is found in the north-eastern Himalaya, India, China and Taiwan.

The wingspan is 40–47 mm.
