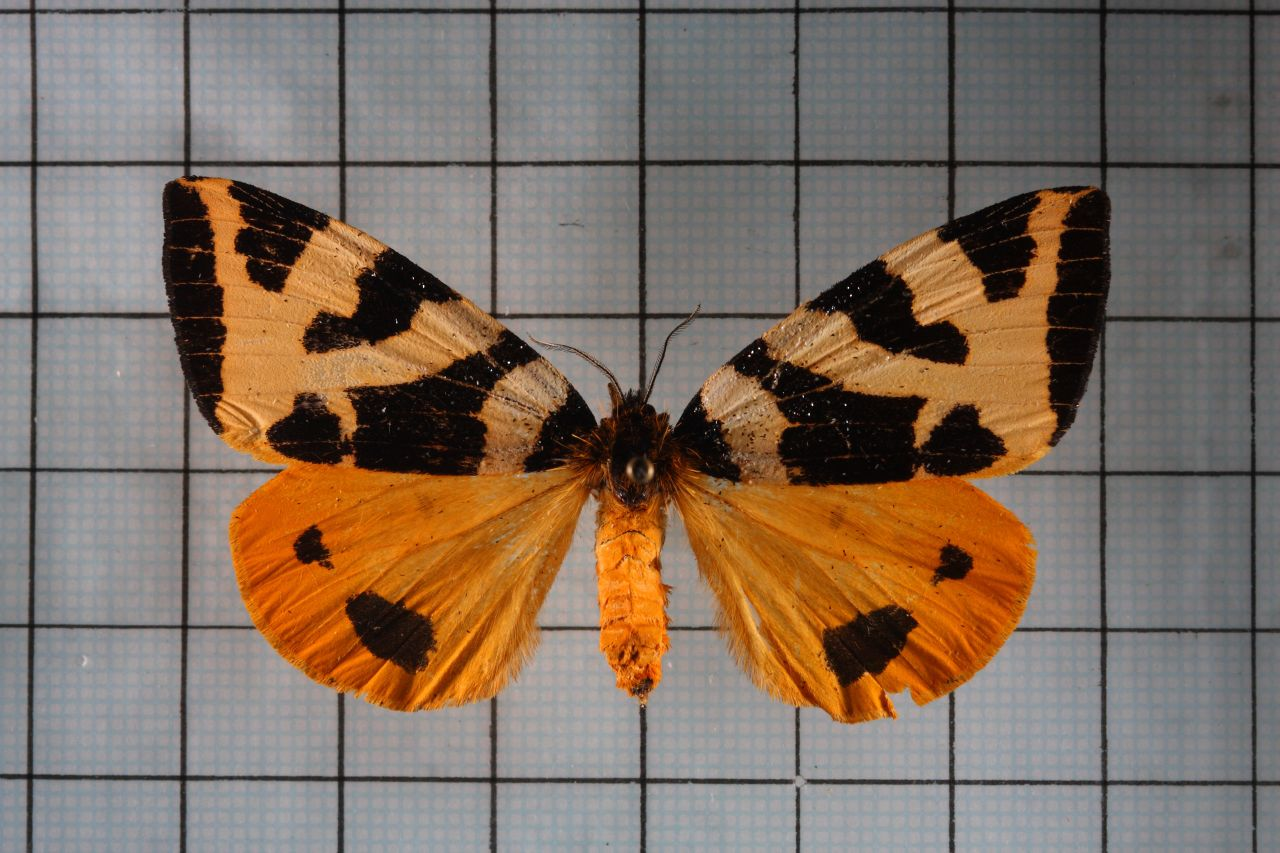

Scientific classification
- Domain: Eukaryota
- Kingdom: Animalia
- Phylum: Arthropoda
- Class: Insecta
- Order: Lepidoptera
- Superfamily: Noctuoidea
- Family: Erebidae
- Genus: Numenes
- Species: N. takamukui

Binomial name
- Numenes takamukui Matsumura, 1927

= Numenes takamukui =

Species of moth

Numenes takamukui is a moth of the family Erebidae first described by Shōnen Matsumura in 1927. It is found in Taiwan.
