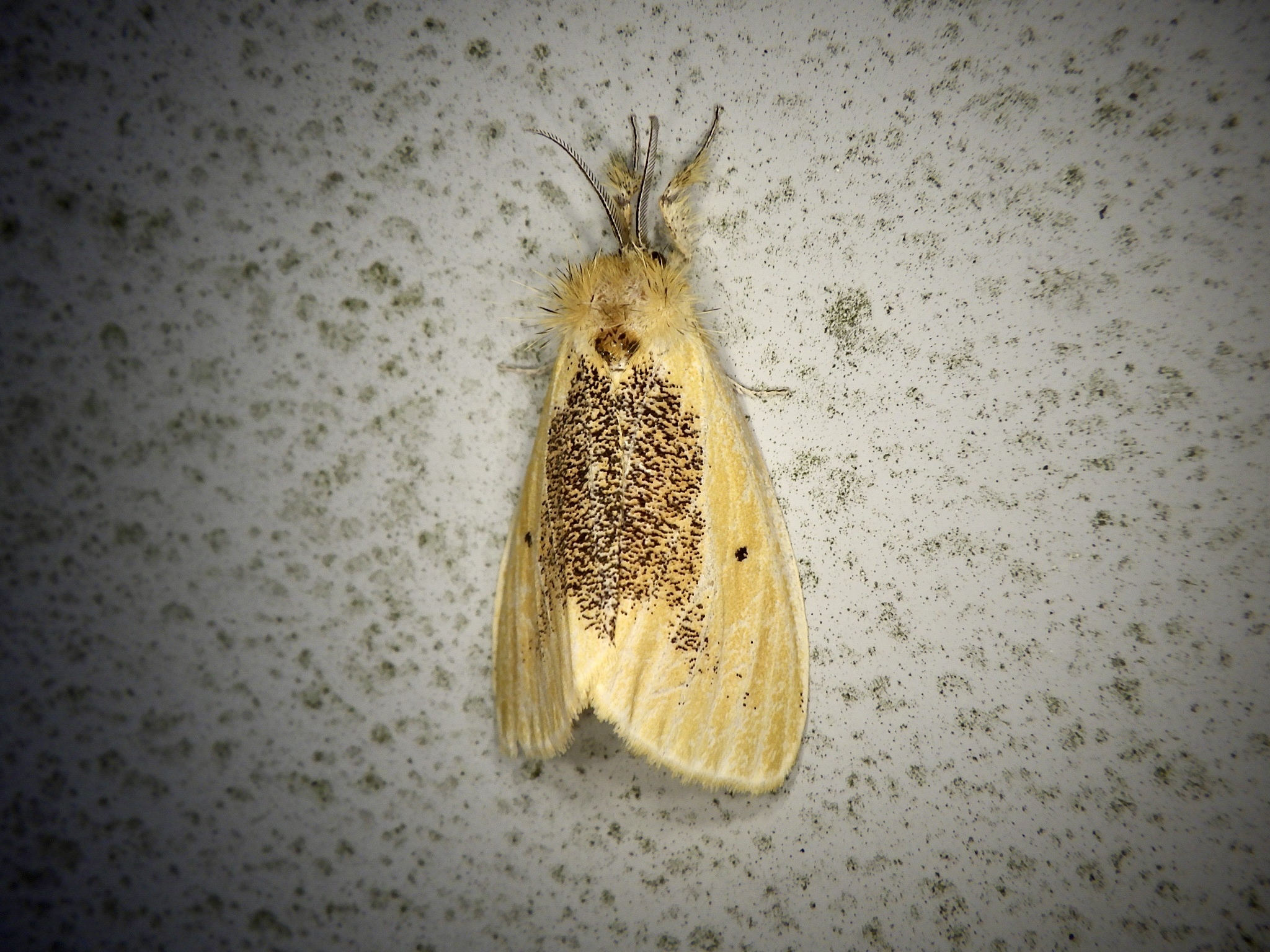
- Kuromondokuga niphonis

Scientific classification
- Kingdom: Animalia
- Phylum: Arthropoda
- Clade: Pancrustacea
- Class: Insecta
- Order: Lepidoptera
- Superfamily: Noctuoidea
- Family: Erebidae
- Tribe: Locharnini
- Genus: Kuromondokuga; Kishida, 2011

= Kuromondokuga =

Genus of moths

Kuromondokuga is a genus of tussock moths in the family Erebidae erected by Yasunori Kishida in 2011.

== Species ==
Based on Wang, H. et al.:

- Kuromondokuga albofascia (Leech, 1888)
- Kuromondokuga niphonis (Butler, 1881)
- Kuromondokuga separata (Leech, 1890)
