= Locharnini =

Scientific classification
- Kingdom: Animalia
- Phylum: Arthropoda
- Clade: Pancrustacea
- Class: Insecta
- Order: Lepidoptera
- Superfamily: Noctuoidea
- Family: Erebidae
- Subfamily: Lymantriinae
- Tribe: Locharnini; Holloway & Wang, 2015

Tribe of moths

The Locharnini are a tribe of tussock moths of the family Erebidae. The tribe was erected by Jeremy Daniel Holloway and Houshuai Wang in 2015.

== Genera ==
Based on Wang, H. et al.:

- Eloria
- Euproctoides
- Kuromondokuga
- Locharna
- Numenes
- Peloroses
- Pida
- Ruanda
