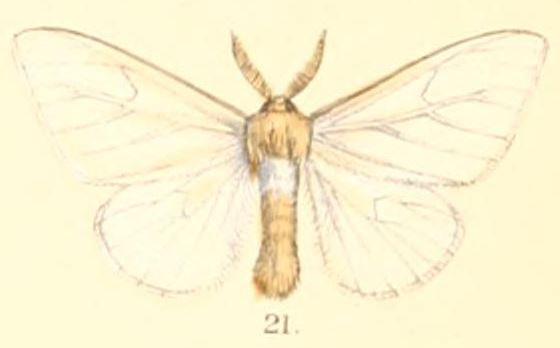

Scientific classification
- Domain: Eukaryota
- Kingdom: Animalia
- Phylum: Arthropoda
- Class: Insecta
- Order: Lepidoptera
- Superfamily: Noctuoidea
- Family: Erebidae
- Genus: Euzora
- Species: E. costalis

Binomial name
- Euzora costalis (Moore, 1879)

Synonyms
- Caragola costalis Moore, 1879

= Euzora costalis =

Species of moth

Euzora costalis is a moth of the subfamily Lymantriinae first described by Frederic Moore in 1879. It is found in Sikkim, India.
