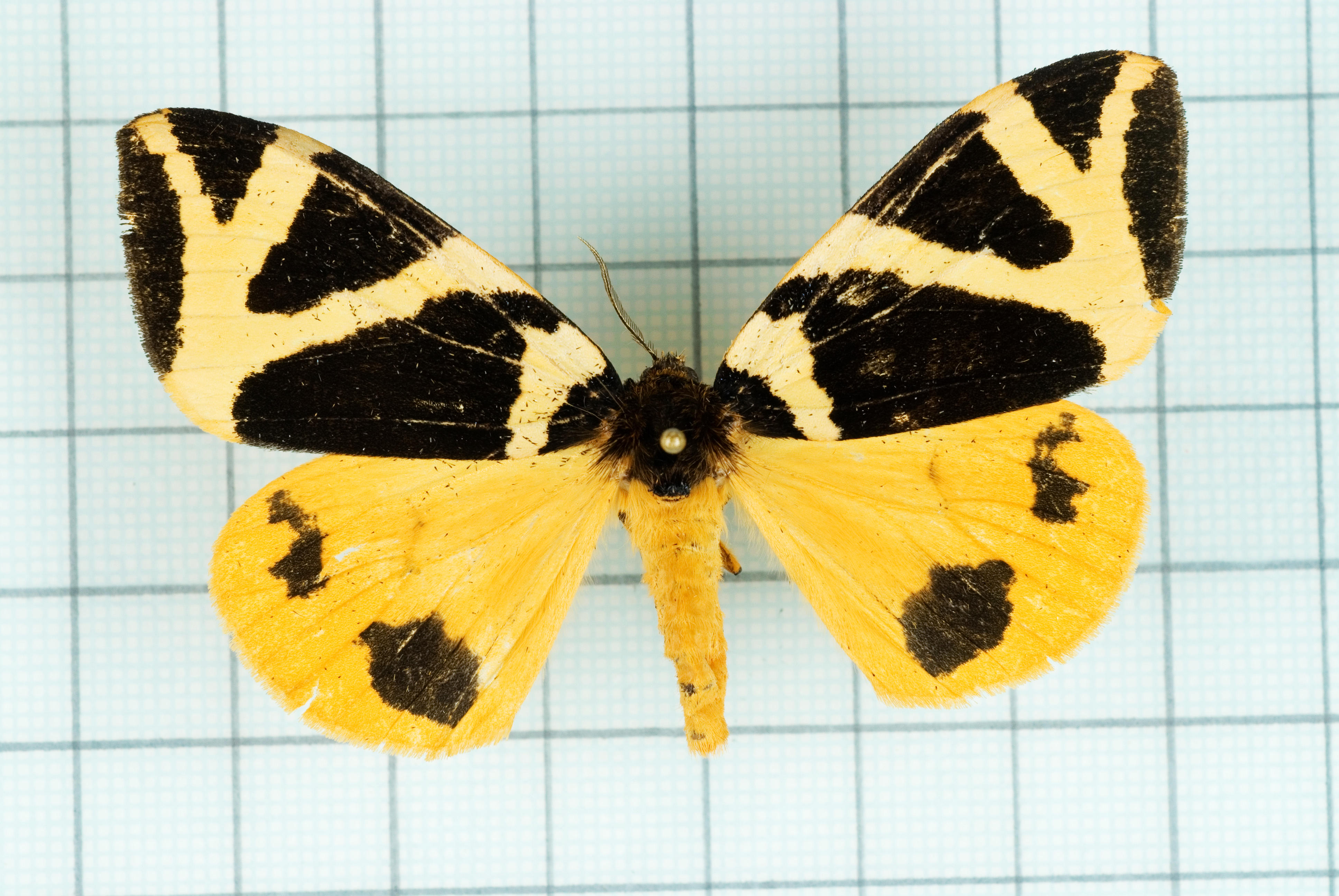
- Numenes takamukui

Scientific classification
- Kingdom: Animalia
- Phylum: Arthropoda
- Clade: Pancrustacea
- Class: Insecta
- Order: Lepidoptera
- Superfamily: Noctuoidea
- Family: Erebidae
- Tribe: Locharnini
- Genus: Numenes; Walker, 1855

Synonyms
- Pseudomesa Walker, 1855

= Numenes =

Genus of moths

Numenes is a genus of tussock moths in the family Erebidae. The genus was erected by Francis Walker in 1855.

== Species ==
- Numenes contrahens Walker, 1862 Sumatra, Peninsular Malaysia, Borneo
- Numenes disparilis Staudinger, 1887 south-eastern Siberia
- Numenes flagrans Tams, 1928 Assam
- Numenes insignis Moore, [1860] Java, Sumatra, Borneo
- Numenes insolita Schultze, 1910 Palawan
- Numenes siletti Walker, 1855 north-eastern India, Peninsular Malaysia
- Numenes strandi Bryk, 1935 Philippines
- Numenes takamukui Matsumura, 1927 Taiwan
