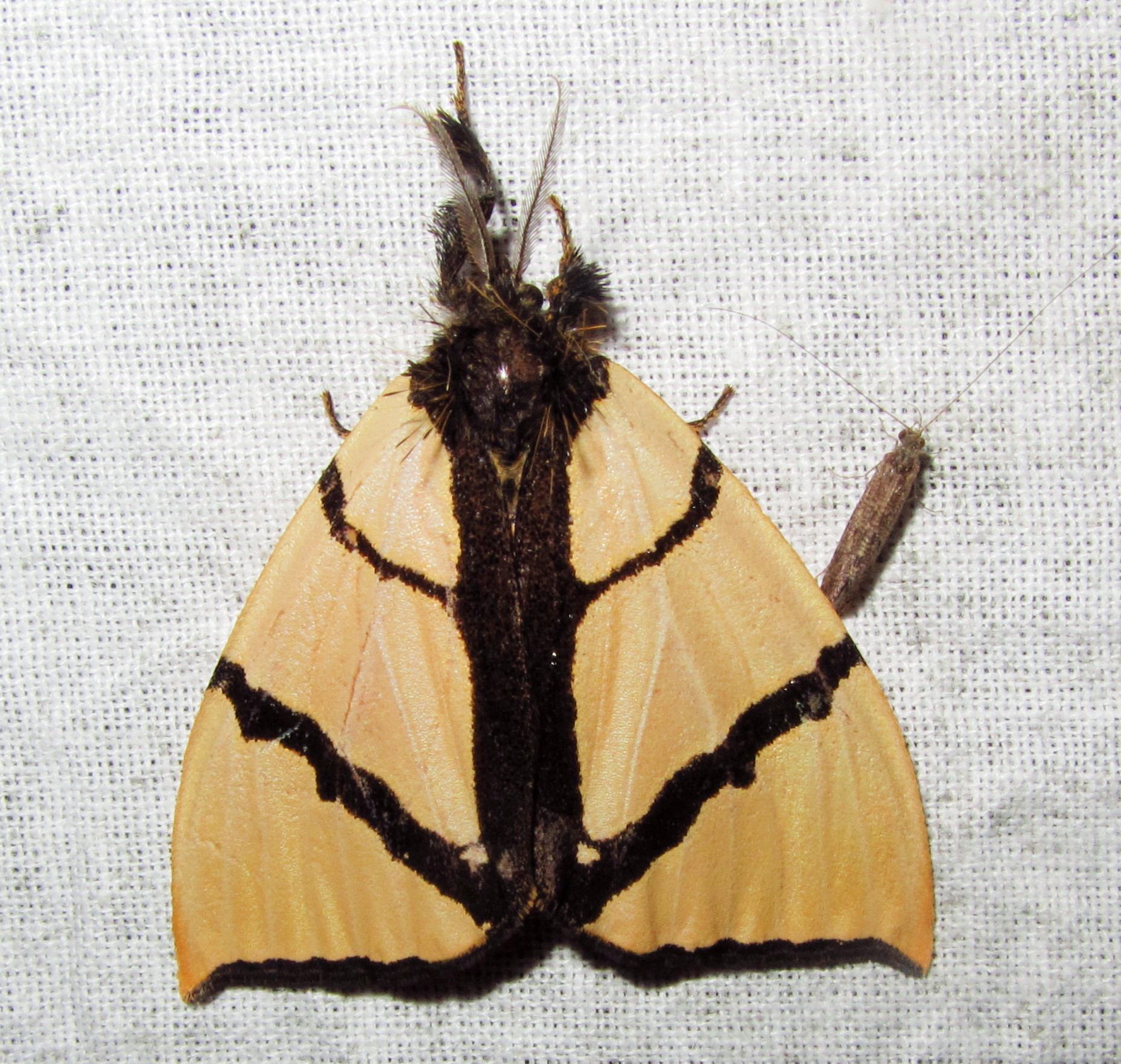

Scientific classification
- Kingdom: Animalia
- Phylum: Arthropoda
- Class: Insecta
- Order: Lepidoptera
- Superfamily: Noctuoidea
- Family: Erebidae
- Genus: Numenes
- Species: N. siletti

Binomial name
- Numenes siletti Walker, 1855

Synonyms
- Pseudomesa quadriplagiata Walker, 1855

= Numenes siletti =

Species of moth

Numenes siletti is a moth of the family Erebidae first described by Francis Walker in 1855. It is found in north-eastern India and Peninsular Malaysia.
