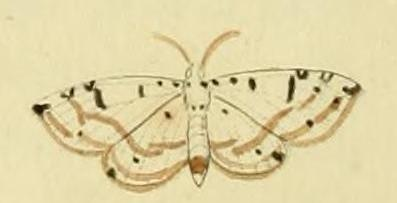

Scientific classification
- Domain: Eukaryota
- Kingdom: Animalia
- Phylum: Arthropoda
- Class: Insecta
- Order: Lepidoptera
- Superfamily: Noctuoidea
- Family: Erebidae
- Genus: Eloria
- Species: E. diaphana

Binomial name
- Eloria diaphana (Stoll, [1781])

Synonyms
- Phalaena diaphana Stoll, [1781]

= Eloria diaphana =

Species of moth

Eloria diaphana is a moth of the subfamily Lymantriinae first described by Stoll in 1781. It is found in Suriname.
