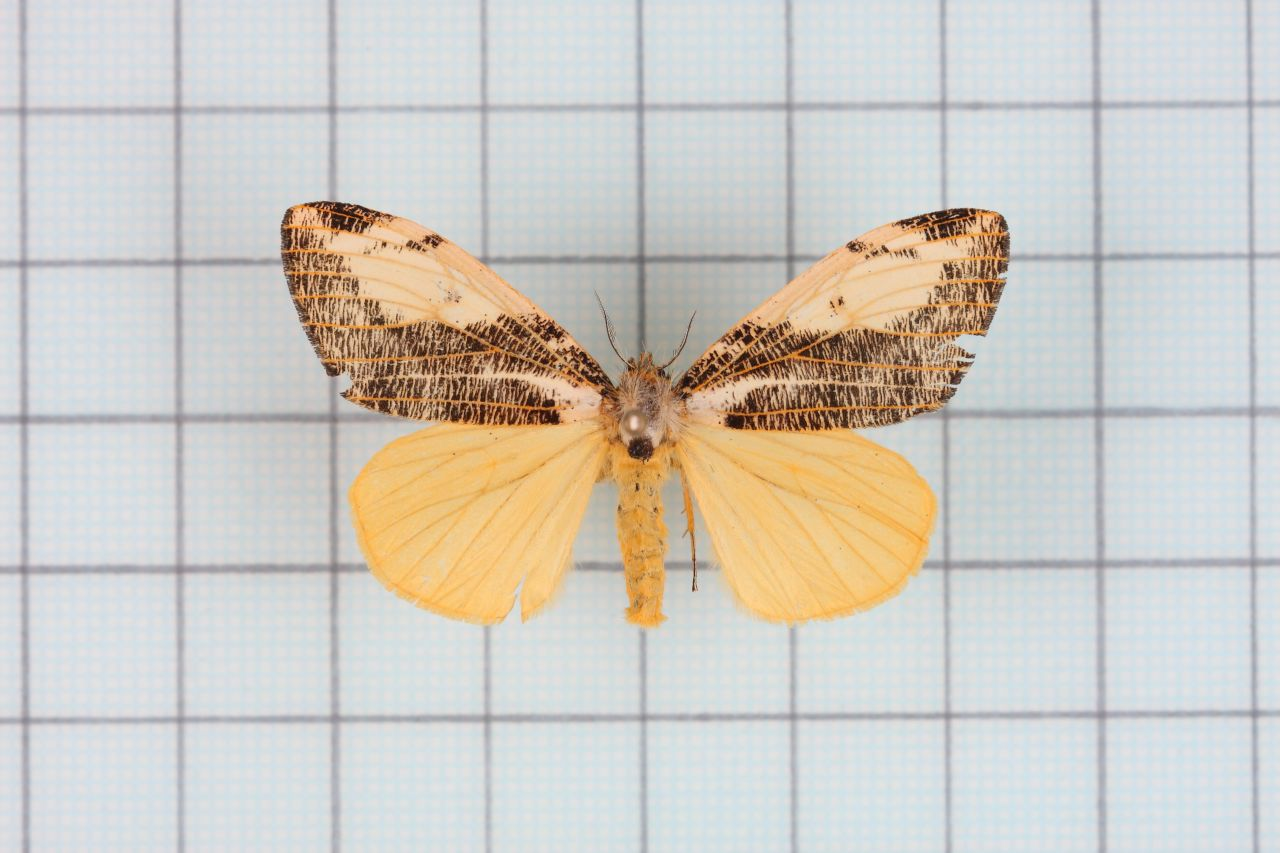
- Female Locharna strigipennis

Scientific classification
- Kingdom: Animalia
- Phylum: Arthropoda
- Clade: Pancrustacea
- Class: Insecta
- Order: Lepidoptera
- Superfamily: Noctuoidea
- Family: Erebidae
- Tribe: Locharnini
- Genus: Locharna; Moore, 1879

= Locharna =

Genus of moths

Locharna is a genus of tussock moths in the family Erebidae. The genus was erected by Frederic Moore in 1879.

== Species ==
- Locharna epiperca Collenette, 1947
- Locharna flavopicta (Chao, 1985)
- Locharna limbata (Collenette, 1932)
- Locharna pica (Chao, 1985)
- Locharna strigipennis Moore, 1879
