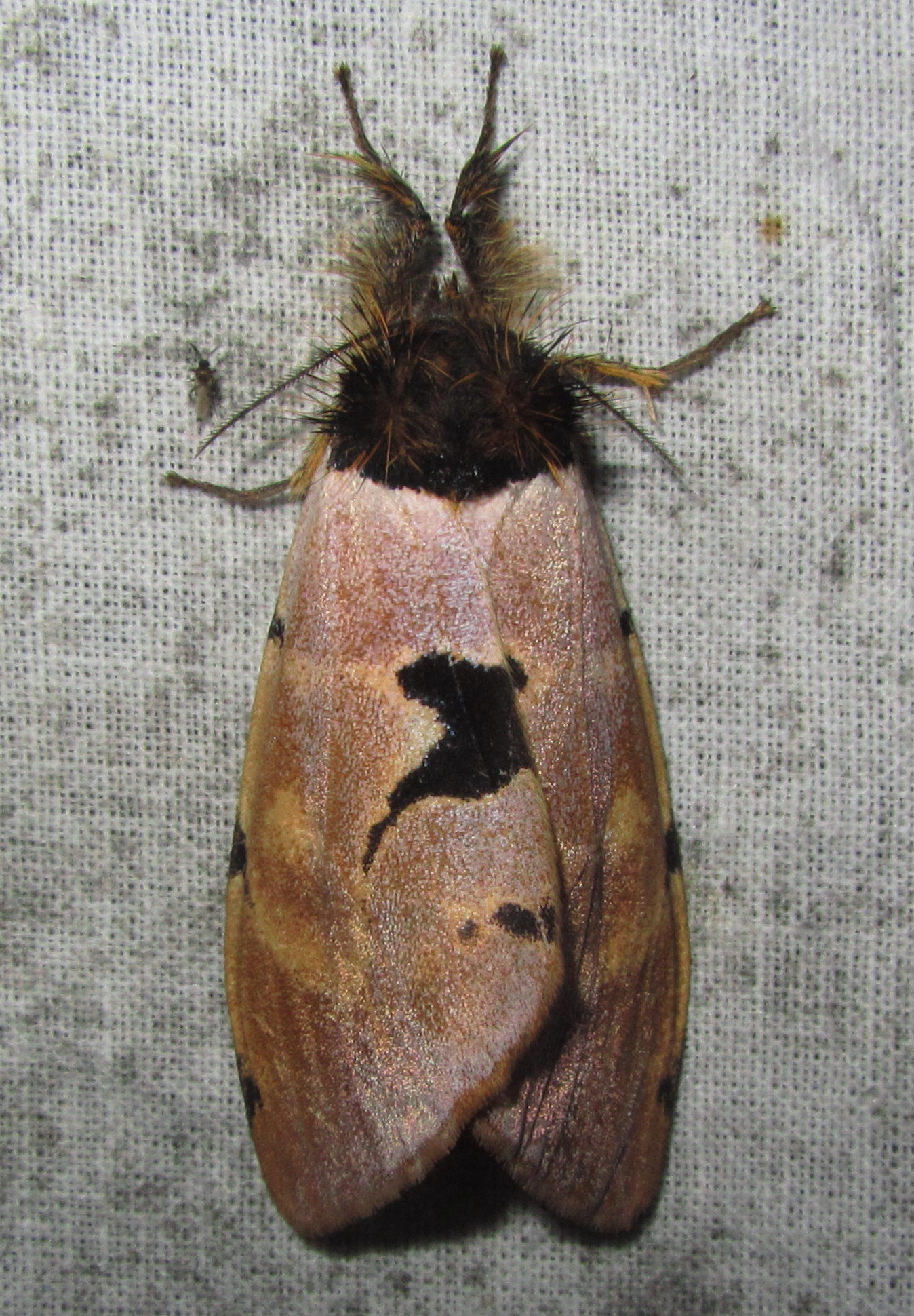

Scientific classification
- Domain: Eukaryota
- Kingdom: Animalia
- Phylum: Arthropoda
- Class: Insecta
- Order: Lepidoptera
- Superfamily: Noctuoidea
- Family: Erebidae
- Genus: Pida
- Species: P. patrana

Binomial name
- Pida patrana (Moore, 1859)

Synonyms
- Numenes patrana Moore, 1859; Numenes partita Walker, 1866

= Pida patrana =

Species of moth

Pida patrana is a moth of the family Erebidae first described by Frederic Moore in 1859. It is found in north-eastern Bhutan, India (Bengal), Nepal and Taiwan.
