= Euproctidion =

Scientific classification
- Domain: Eukaryota
- Kingdom: Animalia
- Phylum: Arthropoda
- Class: Insecta
- Order: Lepidoptera
- Superfamily: Noctuoidea
- Family: Erebidae
- Tribe: Lymantriini
- Genus: Euproctidion; Holland, 1893

Synonyms
- Liparodonta Hering, 1927

Genus of moths

Euproctidion is a genus of moths in the subfamily Lymantriinae. The genus was erected by William Jacob Holland in 1893.

== Species ==
- Euproctidion conradti Collenette, 1931 Cameroon
- Euproctidion convexa (Hering, 1927) Cameroon
- Euproctidion gabunica Holland, 1893 Gabon
- Euproctidion pallida (Holland, 1893) western Africa
- Euproctidion periblepta Collenette, 1954 Congo
- Euproctidion rhodobaphes Collenette, 1931 Zimbabwe
- Euproctidion rhodoides Collenette, 1931 Zimbabwe
- Euproctidion striata Collenette, 1931 Malawi
- Euproctidion uniformis (Hering, 1927) Niger
