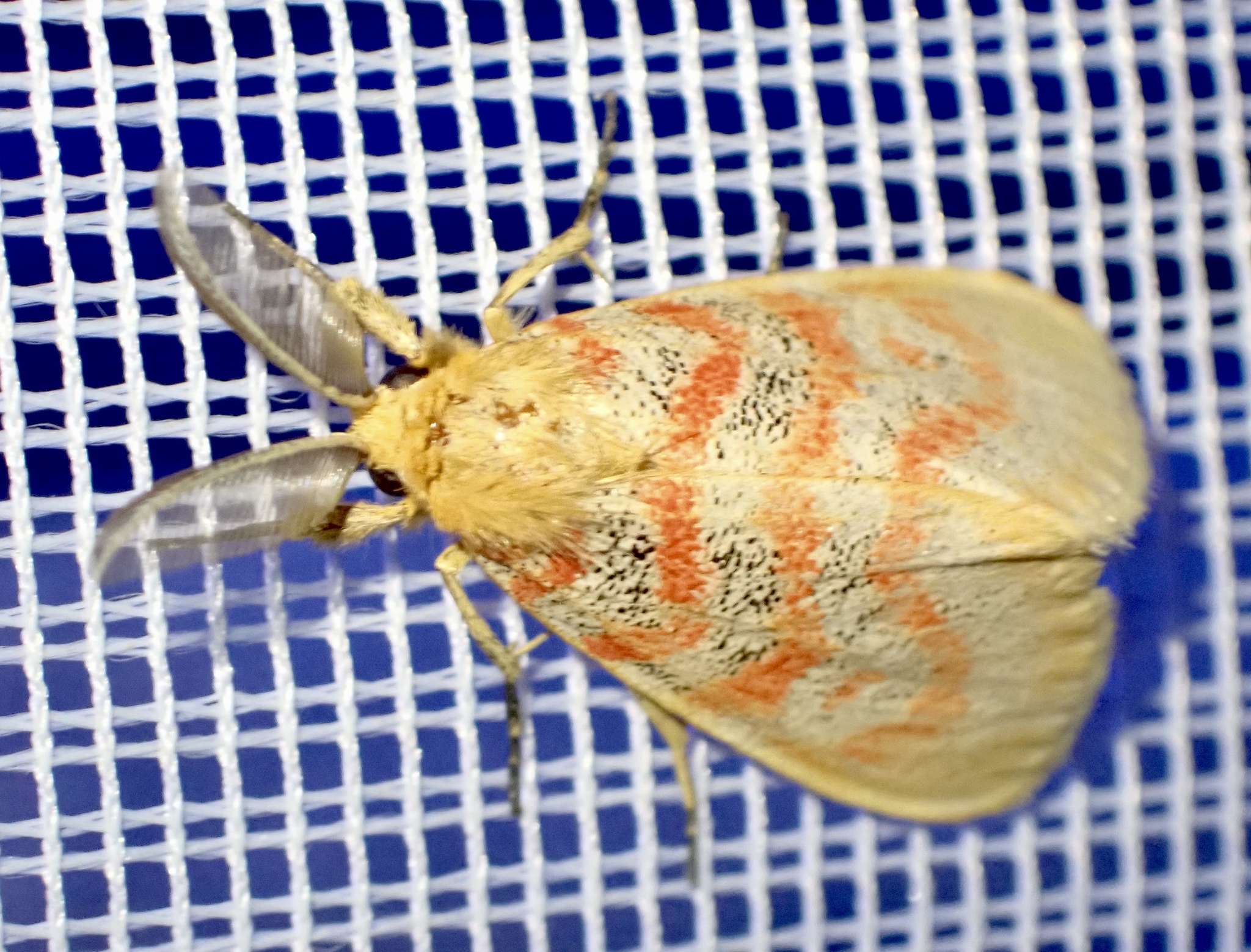
- Euproctoides acrisia

Scientific classification
- Domain: Eukaryota
- Kingdom: Animalia
- Phylum: Arthropoda
- Class: Insecta
- Order: Lepidoptera
- Superfamily: Noctuoidea
- Family: Erebidae
- Subfamily: Lymantriinae
- Tribe: Locharnini
- Genus: Euproctoides; Bethune-Baker, 1911

= Euproctoides =

Genus of moths

Euproctoides is a genus of moths in the subfamily Lymantriinae. The genus was erected by George Thomas Bethune-Baker in 1911.

== Species ==
- Euproctoides acrisia (Plötz, 1880) western Africa, Congo
- Euproctoides ansorgei (Jordan, 1904) Angola
- Euproctoides ertli (Wichgraf, 1922) Angola
- Euproctoides miniata Bethune-Baker, 1911 Angola
- Euproctoides pavonacea (Romieux, 1934) Congo
