= Epeuproctis =

Scientific classification
- Domain: Eukaryota
- Kingdom: Animalia
- Phylum: Arthropoda
- Class: Insecta
- Order: Lepidoptera
- Superfamily: Noctuoidea
- Family: Erebidae
- Genus: Epeuproctis; Matsumura, 1933
- Species: E. tamahonis

Binomial name
- Epeuproctis tamahonis (Matsumura, 1927)

Synonyms
- Euproctis tamahonis Matsumura, 1927

Genus of moths

Epeuproctis is a monotypic moth genus in the family Erebidae. Its only species, Epeuproctis tamahonis, is found in Taiwan. Both the genus and species were first described by Shōnen Matsumura, the genus in 1933 and the species in 1927.

The Global Lepidoptera Names Index gives this name as a synonym of Euproctis Hübner, [1819].
