= Etobema =

Scientific classification
- Kingdom: Animalia
- Phylum: Arthropoda
- Class: Insecta
- Order: Lepidoptera
- Superfamily: Noctuoidea
- Family: Erebidae
- Tribe: Lymantriini
- Genus: Etobema; Walker, 1865

Synonyms
- Rajacoa Swinhoe, 1903

Genus of moths

Etobema is a genus of moths in the subfamily Lymantriinae. The genus was erected by Francis Walker in 1865.

== Species ==
- Etobema antra (Swinhoe, 1903) New Guinea
- Etobema circumdata Walker, 1865 New Guinea
- Etobema eleuterioides (Semper, 1899) Philippines (Luzon)
- Etobema forbesi (H. Druce, 1899) New Guinea
- Etobema fusciapicalis (Rothschild, 1915) New Guinea
- Etobema melanophleps (Collenette, 1930) New Guinea
- Etobema rotundata (Rothschild, 1915) New Guinea
