= Eala (moth) =

Scientific classification
- Kingdom: Animalia
- Phylum: Arthropoda
- Clade: Pancrustacea
- Class: Insecta
- Order: Lepidoptera
- Superfamily: Noctuoidea
- Family: Erebidae
- Tribe: Lymantriini
- Genus: Eala; Collenette, 1937

Genus of moths

Eala is a genus of moths in the subfamily Lymantriinae. The genus was erected by Cyril Leslie Collenette in 1937.

== Species ==
- Eala hemiluta Collenette, 1937 Congo
- Eala lasia Collenette, 1957 Nigeria
