= Eopirga =

Scientific classification
- Domain: Eukaryota
- Kingdom: Animalia
- Phylum: Arthropoda
- Class: Insecta
- Order: Lepidoptera
- Superfamily: Noctuoidea
- Family: Erebidae
- Tribe: Lymantriini
- Genus: Eopirga; Hering, 1926

Genus of moths

Eopirga is a genus of moths in the subfamily Lymantriinae. The genus was described by Hering in 1926. Both species are known from Madagascar.

== Species ==
- Eopirga candida (Hering, 1926)
- Eopirga heptastica (Mabille, 1878)
