= Eala (surname) =

Eala is a Filipino surname. It may refer to:

- Alexandra Eala (born 2005), Filipina tennis player
- Noli Eala, Filipino sports executive and disbarred lawyer
- Rizza Maniego-Eala (born 1968 or 1969), Filipino businesswoman and former competitive swimmer
