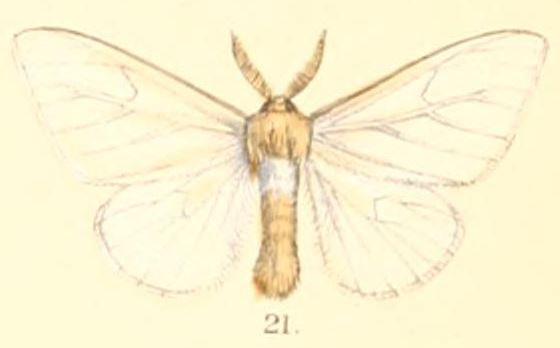
- Euzora costalis

Scientific classification
- Domain: Eukaryota
- Kingdom: Animalia
- Phylum: Arthropoda
- Class: Insecta
- Order: Lepidoptera
- Superfamily: Noctuoidea
- Family: Erebidae
- Tribe: Lymantriini
- Genus: Euzora; Turner, 1915

Type species
- Caragola costalis Moore, 1879

Synonyms
- Caragola Moore, 1879; Caragolina Strand, 1928

= Euzora =

Genus of moths

Euzora is a genus of moths in the subfamily Lymantriinae. The genus was described by Turner in 1915.

== Species ==
- Euzora collucens (Lucas, 1890)
- Euzora costalis Moore, 1879
