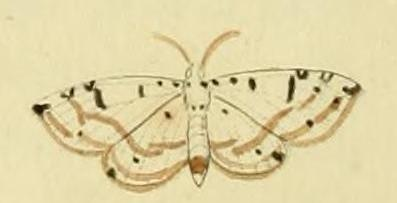
- Eloria diaphana

Scientific classification
- Kingdom: Animalia
- Phylum: Arthropoda
- Class: Insecta
- Order: Lepidoptera
- Superfamily: Noctuoidea
- Family: Erebidae
- Tribe: Locharnini
- Genus: Eloria; Walker, 1855

Synonyms
- Penora Walker, 1855; Axuenna Walker, [1865]

= Eloria =

Genus of moths

Eloria is a genus of moths in the subfamily Lymantriinae. The genus was erected by Francis Walker in 1855.

== Species ==
Eloria contains the following species:

- Eloria albifasciata Dognin 1923
- Eloria apicalis Walker, 1855
- Eloria aroensis Schaus 1906
- Eloria batesi Collenette 1950
- Eloria borealis Collenette 1950
- Eloria burityensis Collenette 1950
- Eloria captiosa Draudt 1927
- Eloria cavallo Collenette 1950
  - Eloria cavallo zoyga Collenette 1950
- Eloria charassomena Collenette 1950
- Eloria chares H. Druce 1893
- Eloria chorax H. Druce 1893
- Eloria cissusa H. Druce 1893
- Eloria clodia H. Druce 1893
- Eloria compulsa Draudt 1927
- Eloria copharpe Collenette 1950
- Eloria corvicoa Schaus 1927
- Eloria cubana Schaus 1906
- Eloria demortua Hübner 1825
- Eloria diaphana Stoll 1751
- Eloria discalis Walker, 1856
- Eloria discifera Walker, 1869
- Eloria ebba Schaus 1927
- Eloria edana Schaus 1927
- Eloria festiva Cramer 1775
- Eloria flavicollis Dognin 1924
- Eloria fumicosta Collenette 1950
- Eloria gigantea H. Druce 1895
- Eloria goyaz Collenette 1950
- Eloria grandis H. Druce 1899
- Eloria gueneei Collenette 1950
- Eloria hiulca Draudt 1927 - Valid Name
- Eloria hoplochares Collenette 1950
- Eloria insulsa Draudt 1927
- Eloria intacta Walker, 1855
- Eloria jocosa Dognin 1923
- Eloria limata Draudt 1927
- Eloria lucida Walker, 1856
- Eloria lyra Collenette 1950
- Eloria mallalia Schaus, 1927
- Eloria manesia Schaus 1927
- Eloria marginalis Walker, 1855
- Eloria melaphleba Collenette 1950
- Eloria melarrhoys Collenette 1950
- Eloria moeonia H. Druce 1899
- Eloria moeschleri Dognin 1923
- Eloria moesta Walker, 1856
- Eloria mossi Collenette 1950
- Eloria muzo Collenette 1950
- Eloria nigella Dognin 1923
- Eloria nimbosa Dognin 1923
- Eloria ninya Dognin 1923
- Eloria noyesi Schaus 1927
- Eloria ombrea H. Druce 1886
- Eloria onaba H. Druce 1886
- Eloria opaca Dognin 1923
- Eloria orosi Collenette 1950
- Eloria pellucida Hübner 1823
- Eloria pelocraspeda Collenette 1950
- Eloria peruviana Collenette 1950
- Eloria remota Walker, 1855
- Eloria roraima Collenette 1950
- Eloria rosenbergi Collenette 1950
- Eloria schausi Draudt 1927
- Eloria serena Schaus 1906
- Eloria sixola Schaus 1910
- Eloria spectra Hübner 1819-1826
- Eloria subapicalis Walker, 1863
- Eloria subnuda Walker, 1855
- Eloria teffe Collenette 1950
- Eloria torrida Schaus 1910
- Eloria ucayali Collenette 1950
- Eloria velhoa Schaus 1920
- Eloria venosa Walker, 1855
- Eloria walkeri Collenette 1950
