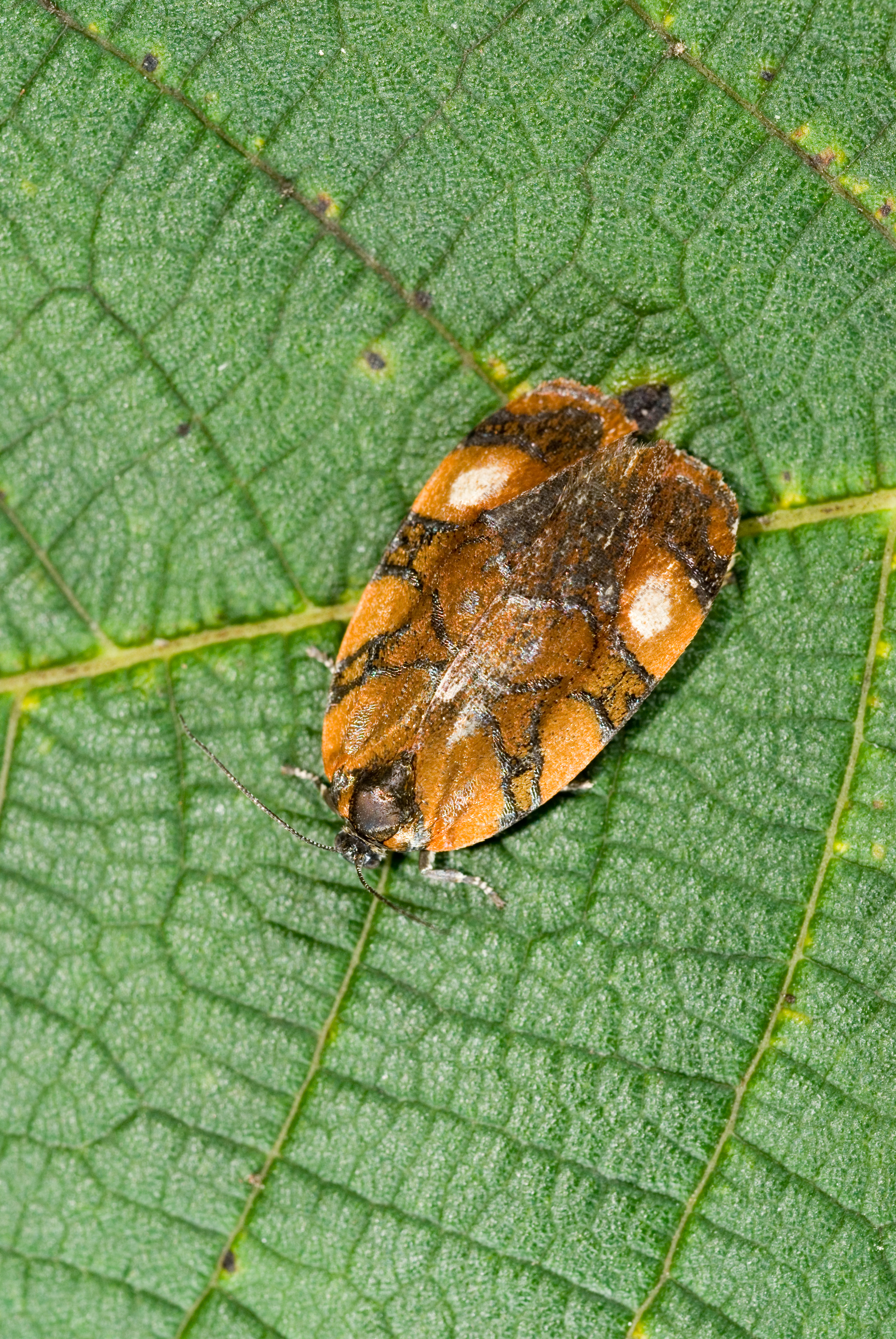

Scientific classification
- Kingdom: Animalia
- Phylum: Arthropoda
- Class: Insecta
- Order: Lepidoptera
- Family: Tortricidae
- Genus: Pentacitrotus
- Species: P. tetrakore

Binomial name
- Pentacitrotus tetrakore (Wileman & Stringer, 1929)

Synonyms
- Eucosma tetrakore Wileman & Stringer, 1929

= Pentacitrotus tetrakore =

Species of moth

Pentacitrotus tetrakore is a species of moth of the family Tortricidae. It is found in Taiwan.
