= Pentacitrotus =

Scientific classification
- Domain: Eukaryota
- Kingdom: Animalia
- Phylum: Arthropoda
- Class: Insecta
- Order: Lepidoptera
- Family: Tortricidae
- Tribe: Ceracini
- Genus: Pentacitrotus; Butler, 1881

Genus of tortrix moths

Pentacitrotus is a genus of moths belonging to the subfamily Tortricinae of the family Tortricidae.

== Species ==
- Pentacitrotus leechi Diakonoff sensu Diakonoff, 1950, 1970
- Pentacitrotus maculatus Kawabe, 1993
- Pentacitrotus quercivorus Diakonoff, 1950
- Pentacitrotus tetrakore (Wileman & Stringer, 1929)
- Pentacitrotus vulneratus Butler, 1881

== See also ==
- List of Tortricidae genera
