= Eurydoxa rhodopa =

Scientific classification
- Domain: Eukaryota
- Kingdom: Animalia
- Phylum: Arthropoda
- Class: Insecta
- Order: Lepidoptera
- Family: Tortricidae
- Genus: Eurydoxa
- Species: E. rhodopa

Binomial name
- Eurydoxa rhodopa Diakonoff, 1950

Species of moth

Eurydoxa rhodopa is a species of moth of the family Tortricidae. It is found in China.

The wingspan is about 29 mm.
