= Bathypluta triphaenella =

Scientific classification
- Kingdom: Animalia
- Phylum: Arthropoda
- Class: Insecta
- Order: Lepidoptera
- Family: Tortricidae
- Genus: Bathypluta
- Species: B. triphaenella

Binomial name
- Bathypluta triphaenella (Snellen, 1903)

Synonyms
- Cerace triphaenella Snellen, 1903; Cerace triphaenella var. melanoptera Diakonoff, 1941; Cerace triphaenella var. nox Diakonoff, 1941; Bathypluta triphaenella sparna Diakonoff, 1950; Bathypluta sulawesiensis Kawabe, 1993; Cerace triphanella Diakonoff, 1941

Species of moth

Bathypluta triphaenella is a species of moth of the family Tortricidae. It is found in Indonesia on the islands of Java and Sulawesi.

The length of the forewings is about 22 mm.

The larvae have been reported as a minor pest on Camellia sinensis and Cinchona species.
