= Cerace onustana =

Scientific classification
- Kingdom: Animalia
- Phylum: Arthropoda
- Class: Insecta
- Order: Lepidoptera
- Family: Tortricidae
- Genus: Cerace
- Species: C. onustana

Binomial name
- Cerace onustana Walker, 1863

Synonyms
- Cerace guttana Felder & Rogenhofer, 1875; Cerace guttana obscura Diakonoff, 1950

Species of moth

Cerace onustana is a species of moth of the family Tortricidae. It is found in Nepal and India (Assam, Bengal).

The wingspan is 39–60 mm.
