= Cerace semnologa =

Scientific classification
- Domain: Eukaryota
- Kingdom: Animalia
- Phylum: Arthropoda
- Class: Insecta
- Order: Lepidoptera
- Family: Tortricidae
- Genus: Cerace
- Species: C. semnologa

Binomial name
- Cerace semnologa Diakonoff, 1976

Species of moth

Cerace semnologa is a species of moth of the family Tortricidae. It is found in Nepal.
