= Cerace myriopa =

Scientific classification
- Kingdom: Animalia
- Phylum: Arthropoda
- Class: Insecta
- Order: Lepidoptera
- Family: Tortricidae
- Genus: Cerace
- Species: C. myriopa

Binomial name
- Cerace myriopa Meyrick, 1922

Species of moth

Cerace myriopa is a species of moth of the family Tortricidae. It is found in Sichuan, China.

The wingspan is about 56 mm.
