= Cerace lemeepauli =

Scientific classification
- Domain: Eukaryota
- Kingdom: Animalia
- Phylum: Arthropoda
- Class: Insecta
- Order: Lepidoptera
- Family: Tortricidae
- Genus: Cerace
- Species: C. lemeepauli

Binomial name
- Cerace lemeepauli Leme, in Leme & Tams, 1950

Species of moth

Cerace lemeepauli is a species of moth of the family Tortricidae. It is found in northern Vietnam.

The wingspan is about 51 mm.
