= Pentacitrotus quercivorus =

Scientific classification
- Domain: Eukaryota
- Kingdom: Animalia
- Phylum: Arthropoda
- Class: Insecta
- Order: Lepidoptera
- Family: Tortricidae
- Genus: Pentacitrotus
- Species: P. quercivorus

Binomial name
- Pentacitrotus quercivorus Diakonoff, 1950

Species of moth

Pentacitrotus quercivorus is a species of moth of the family Tortricidae. It is found in the north-eastern Himalayas.

The wingspan is about 26 mm.

The larvae feed on Quercus semicarpifolia.
