= Cerace euchrysa =

Scientific classification
- Domain: Eukaryota
- Kingdom: Animalia
- Phylum: Arthropoda
- Class: Insecta
- Order: Lepidoptera
- Family: Tortricidae
- Genus: Cerace
- Species: C. euchrysa

Binomial name
- Cerace euchrysa Diakonoff, 1974

Species of moth

Cerace euchrysa is a species of moth of the family Tortricidae. It is found in Thailand.
