= Cerace diehli =

Scientific classification
- Domain: Eukaryota
- Kingdom: Animalia
- Phylum: Arthropoda
- Class: Insecta
- Order: Lepidoptera
- Family: Tortricidae
- Genus: Cerace
- Species: C. diehli

Binomial name
- Cerace diehli Buchsbaum & Miller, 2002

Species of moth

Cerace diehli is a species of moth of the family Tortricidae. It is found in Papua New Guinea and on Sumatra.
