= Pentacitrotus vulneratus =

Scientific classification
- Domain: Eukaryota
- Kingdom: Animalia
- Phylum: Arthropoda
- Class: Insecta
- Order: Lepidoptera
- Family: Tortricidae
- Genus: Pentacitrotus
- Species: P. vulneratus

Binomial name
- Pentacitrotus vulneratus Butler, 1881

Synonyms
- Pentacitrotus aeneus Leech, 1890; Pentacitrotus vulneratus var. congruens Diakonoff, 1950; Pentacitrotus vulneratus var. distinctus Diakonoff, 1950; Cerace vulnerata

Species of moth

Pentacitrotus vulneratus is a species of moth of the family Tortricidae. It is found in China and India (Assam, Punjab).

The wingspan is 23–25 mm.
