= Cerace anthera =

Scientific classification
- Domain: Eukaryota
- Kingdom: Animalia
- Phylum: Arthropoda
- Class: Insecta
- Order: Lepidoptera
- Family: Tortricidae
- Genus: Cerace
- Species: C. anthera

Binomial name
- Cerace anthera Diakonoff, 1950

Species of moth

Cerace anthera is a species of moth of the family Tortricidae. It is found in China.

The wingspan is about 33 mm.
