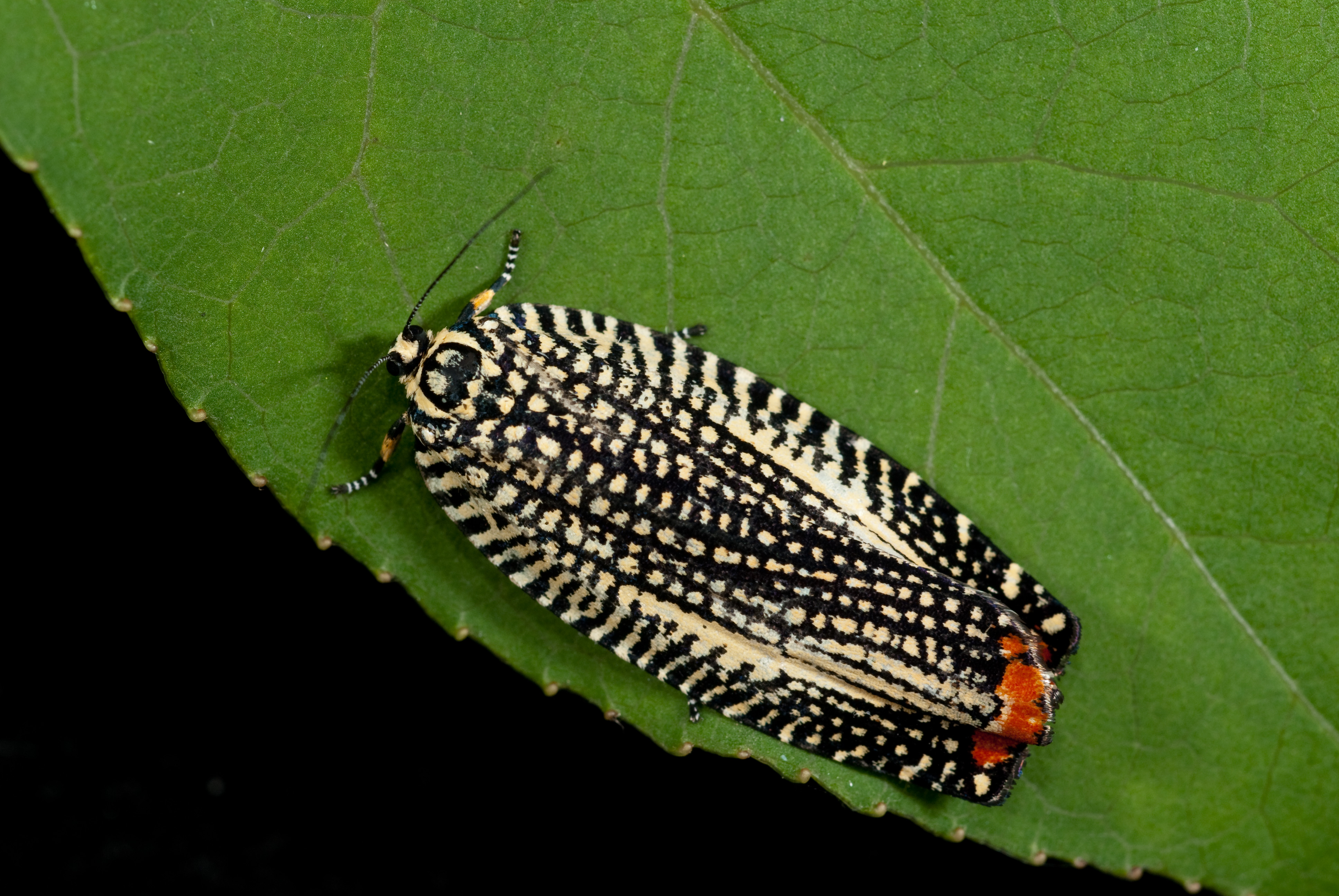

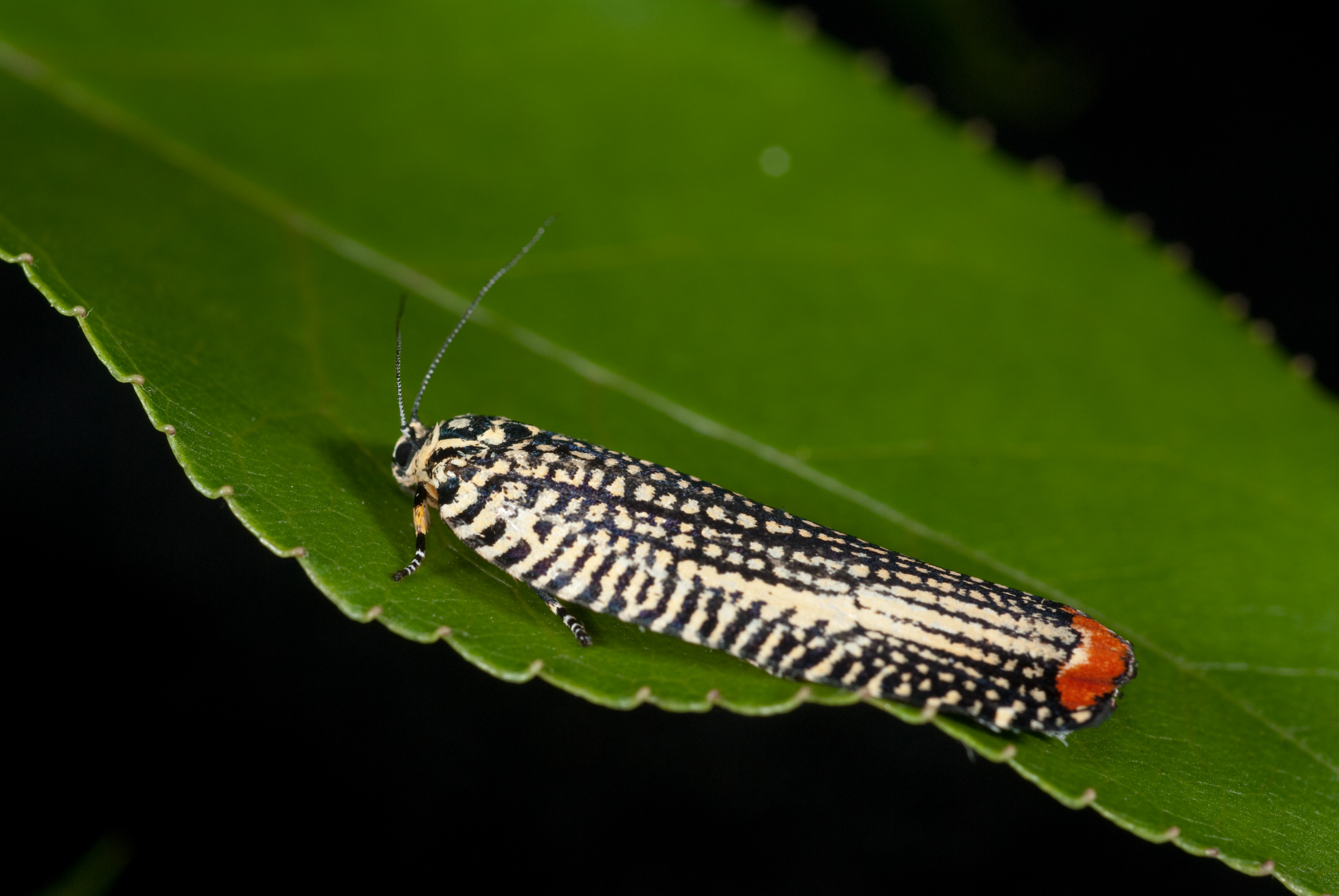

Scientific classification
- Kingdom: Animalia
- Phylum: Arthropoda
- Clade: Pancrustacea
- Class: Insecta
- Order: Lepidoptera
- Family: Tortricidae
- Genus: Eurydoxa
- Species: E. indigena

Binomial name
- Eurydoxa indigena Yasuda, 1978

= Eurydoxa indigena =

Species of moth

Eurydoxa indigena is a moth species belonging to the family Tortricidae. It is found in Taiwan.
