= Cerace xanthothrix =

Scientific classification
- Domain: Eukaryota
- Kingdom: Animalia
- Phylum: Arthropoda
- Class: Insecta
- Order: Lepidoptera
- Family: Tortricidae
- Genus: Cerace
- Species: C. xanthothrix

Binomial name
- Cerace xanthothrix Diakonoff, 1950

Species of moth

Cerace xanthothrix is a species of moth of the family Tortricidae. It is found in Assam, India, and was first described in 1950 by Alexey Diakonoff.

The wingspan is 33–48 mm.
