= Cerace vietnamna =

Scientific classification
- Kingdom: Animalia
- Phylum: Arthropoda
- Class: Insecta
- Order: Lepidoptera
- Family: Tortricidae
- Genus: Cerace
- Species: C. vietnamna

Binomial name
- Cerace vietnamna Kawabe, 1993

Species of moth

Cerace vietnamna is a species of moth of the family Tortricidae. It is found in northern Vietnam.

The wingspan is about 20 mm.
