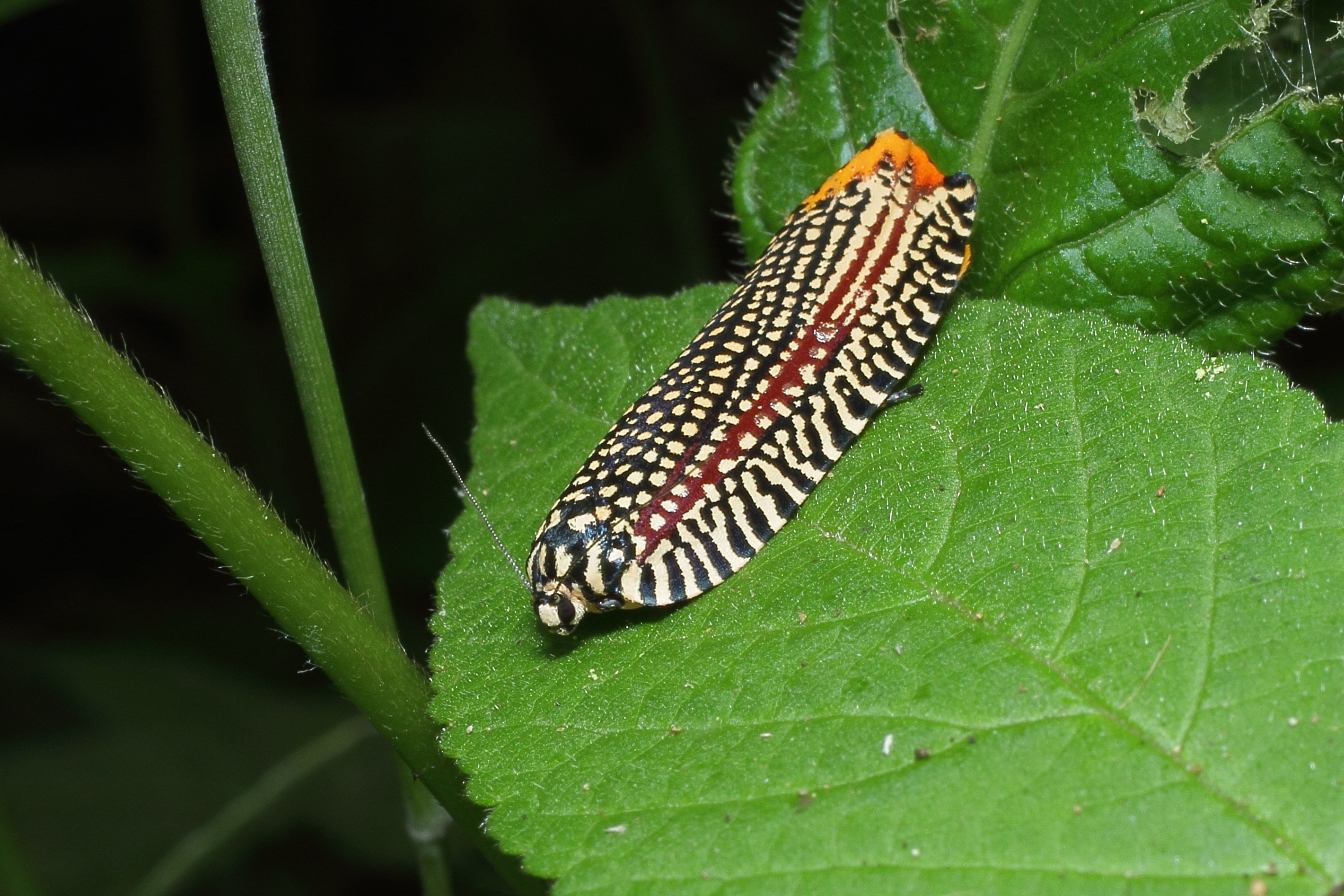

Scientific classification
- Domain: Eukaryota
- Kingdom: Animalia
- Phylum: Arthropoda
- Class: Insecta
- Order: Lepidoptera
- Family: Tortricidae
- Genus: Cerace
- Species: C. xanthocosma

Binomial name
- Cerace xanthocosma Diakonoff, 1950

= Cerace xanthocosma =

Species of moth

Cerace xanthocosma, the kaleidoscope moth, is a species of moth of the family Tortricidae. It is found in Russia, Japan (Honshu, Shikoku, Kyushu) and Taiwan.

The wingspan is 35–60 mm. There are two generations per year in Japan.

The larvae are polyphagous and have been recorded feeding on Quercus acuta, Punica granatum, Magnolia grandiflora, Ilex pedunculosa, Acer palmatum, Clethra barvinensis, Pieris japonica, Lyonia ovalifolia, Prunus and Cinnamonum species.
