= Cerace tonkinana =

Scientific classification
- Kingdom: Animalia
- Phylum: Arthropoda
- Clade: Pancrustacea
- Class: Insecta
- Order: Lepidoptera
- Family: Tortricidae
- Genus: Cerace
- Species: C. tonkinana

Binomial name
- Cerace tonkinana Heppner, 2010

Species of moth

Cerace tonkinana is a species of moth of the family Tortricidae. It is found in Vietnam.
