= Pentacitrotus leechi =

Scientific classification
- Domain: Eukaryota
- Kingdom: Animalia
- Phylum: Arthropoda
- Class: Insecta
- Order: Lepidoptera
- Family: Tortricidae
- Genus: Pentacitrotus
- Species: P. leechi

Binomial name
- Pentacitrotus leechi Diakonoff sensu Diakonoff, 1950, 1970

Synonyms
- Pentacitrotus aeneus Diakonoff, 1950; Phaecasiophora obligata Kawabe, 1993

Species of moth

Pentacitrotus leechi is a species of moth of the family Tortricidae. It is found in central China and Taiwan.

The wingspan is about 32 mm.
