= Eurydoxa advena =

Scientific classification
- Domain: Eukaryota
- Kingdom: Animalia
- Phylum: Arthropoda
- Class: Insecta
- Order: Lepidoptera
- Family: Tortricidae
- Genus: Eurydoxa
- Species: E. advena

Binomial name
- Eurydoxa advena Filipjev, 1930

Synonyms
- Ceraceopsis advena orbimaculata Kurentsov, 1956; Ceraceopsis sapporensis Matsumura, 1931; Eurydoxa sapporensis; Ceraceopsis ussuriensis Kurentsov, 1956

Species of moth

Eurydoxa advena is a species of moth of the family Tortricidae described by Ivan Nikolayevich Filipjev in 1930. It is found in the Russian Far East, China (Sichuan, Heilongjiang) and Japan (Hokkaido, Honshu).

The wingspan is about 33 mm for males and about 38 mm for females. Adults are on wing in mid-July in China.

The larvae feed on Picea jezoensis, Abies veitchii and Abies sachalinensis.
