= Cerace malayana =

Scientific classification
- Domain: Eukaryota
- Kingdom: Animalia
- Phylum: Arthropoda
- Class: Insecta
- Order: Lepidoptera
- Family: Tortricidae
- Genus: Cerace
- Species: C. malayana

Binomial name
- Cerace malayana Diakonoff, 1970

Species of moth

Cerace malayana is a species of moth of the family Tortricidae. It is found on Peninsular Malaysia.

The wingspan is about 44.5 mm.
