= Cerace tetraonis =

Scientific classification
- Domain: Eukaryota
- Kingdom: Animalia
- Phylum: Arthropoda
- Class: Insecta
- Order: Lepidoptera
- Family: Tortricidae
- Genus: Cerace
- Species: C. tetraonis

Binomial name
- Cerace tetraonis Butler, 1886

Synonyms
- Cerace perdicina Moore, 1888; Cerace tetraonis archimedis Diakonoff, 1950

Species of moth

Cerace tetraonis is a species of moth of the family Tortricidae. It is found in China, Pakistan and India.

The wingspan is 25–39 mm.
