= Eurydoxa mesoclasta =

Scientific classification
- Kingdom: Animalia
- Phylum: Arthropoda
- Class: Insecta
- Order: Lepidoptera
- Family: Tortricidae
- Genus: Eurydoxa
- Species: E. mesoclasta

Binomial name
- Eurydoxa mesoclasta (Meyrick, 1908)

Synonyms
- Cerace mesoclasta Meyrick, 1908; Eurydoxa tamsi Diakonoff, 1950

Species of moth

Eurydoxa mesoclasta is a species of moth of the family Tortricidae. It is found in the eastern Himalayas and Sikkim, India.

The wingspan is 41–47 mm.
