= Eurydoxa =

Scientific classification
- Domain: Eukaryota
- Kingdom: Animalia
- Phylum: Arthropoda
- Class: Insecta
- Order: Lepidoptera
- Family: Tortricidae
- Tribe: Ceracini
- Genus: Eurydoxa; Filipjev, 1930

Synonyms
- Ceraceopsis Matsumura, 1931

Genus of tortrix moths

Eurydoxa is a genus of moths belonging to the subfamily Tortricinae of the family Tortricidae.

== Species ==
- Eurydoxa advena Filipjev, 1930
- Eurydoxa indigena Yasuda, 1978
- Eurydoxa mesoclasta (Meyrick, 1908)
- Eurydoxa rhodopa Diakonoff, 1950

== See also ==
- List of Tortricidae genera
