= Bathypluta metoeca =

Scientific classification
- Domain: Eukaryota
- Kingdom: Animalia
- Phylum: Arthropoda
- Class: Insecta
- Order: Lepidoptera
- Family: Tortricidae
- Genus: Bathypluta
- Species: B. metoeca

Binomial name
- Bathypluta metoeca Diakonoff, 1950

Species of moth

Bathypluta metoeca is a species of moth of the family Tortricidae. It is found on the Lesser Sunda Islands north of Australia.
