= Cerace ios =

Scientific classification
- Domain: Eukaryota
- Kingdom: Animalia
- Phylum: Arthropoda
- Class: Insecta
- Order: Lepidoptera
- Family: Tortricidae
- Genus: Cerace
- Species: C. ios

Binomial name
- Cerace ios Diakonoff, 1941

Species of moth

Cerace ios is a species of moth of the family Tortricidae. It is found on Borneo.

The wingspan is about 45 mm.
