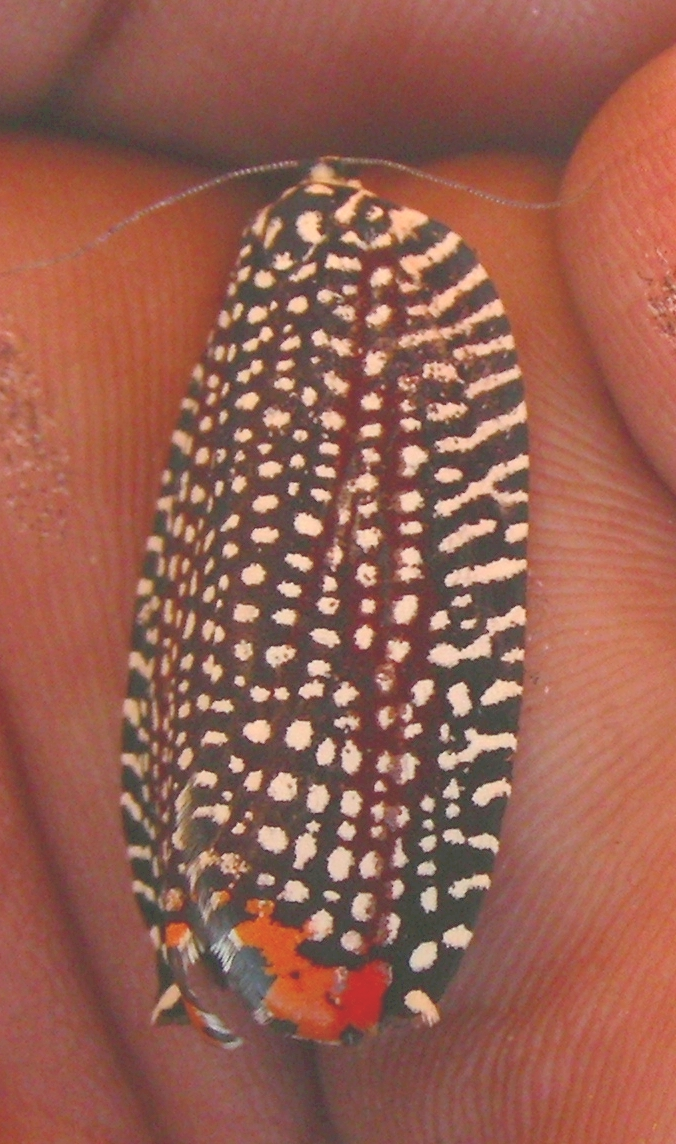
- Cerace stipatana

Scientific classification
- Kingdom: Animalia
- Phylum: Arthropoda
- Class: Insecta
- Order: Lepidoptera
- Family: Tortricidae
- Subfamily: Tortricinae
- Tribe: Ceracini
- Genus: Cerace; Walker, 1863

= Cerace =

Genus of tortrix moths

Cerace is a genus of moths belonging to the subfamily Tortricinae of the family Tortricidae.

== Species ==
- Cerace anthera Diakonoff, 1950
- Cerace charidotis Razowski, 1992
- Cerace cyanopyga Diakonoff, 1950
- Cerace diehli Buchsbaum & Miller, 2002
- Cerace euchrysa Diakonoff, 1974
- Cerace ios Diakonoff, 1941
- Cerace lemeepauli Leme, in Leme & Tams, 1950
- Cerace loxodes Meyrick, 1912
- Cerace malayana Diakonoff, 1970
- Cerace myriopa Meyrick, 1922
- Cerace onustana Walker, 1863
- Cerace sardias Meyrick, 1907
- Cerace semnologa Diakonoff, 1976
- Cerace stipatana Walker, 1863
- Cerace tetraonis Butler, 1886
- Cerace tonkinana Heppner, 2010
- Cerace vietnamna Kawabe, 1993
- Cerace xanthocosma Diakonoff, 1950
- Cerace xanthothrix Diakonoff, 1950

== See also ==
- List of Tortricidae genera
