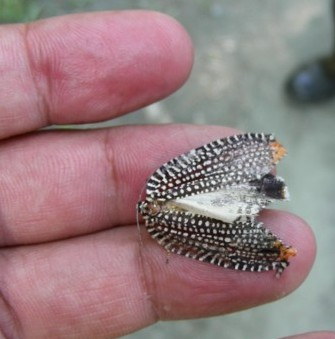
- Cerace stipatana

Scientific classification
- Domain: Eukaryota
- Kingdom: Animalia
- Phylum: Arthropoda
- Class: Insecta
- Order: Lepidoptera
- Family: Tortricidae
- Subfamily: Tortricinae
- Tribe: Ceracini; Cotes and Swinhoe, 1889

Genera
- See text

Synonyms
- Ceracidae

= Ceracini =

Tribe of moths

The Ceracini are a tribe of tortrix moths.

== Genera ==
Bathypluta
Cerace
Eurydoxa
Pentacitrotus
