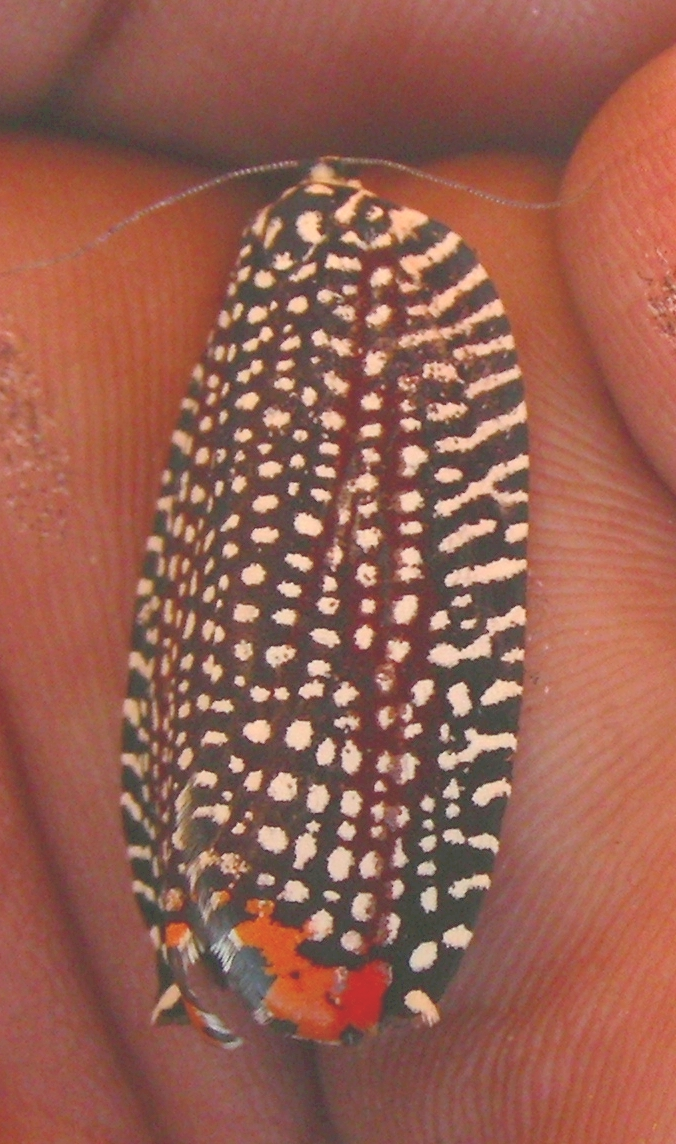

Scientific classification
- Kingdom: Animalia
- Phylum: Arthropoda
- Class: Insecta
- Order: Lepidoptera
- Family: Tortricidae
- Genus: Cerace
- Species: C. stipatana

Binomial name
- Cerace stipatana Walker, 1863

= Cerace stipatana =

Species of moth

Cerace stipatana is a moth of the family Tortricidae and type species of the genus Cerace. It is found in Asia. See the subspecies section for more details.

The wingspan is 38–60 mm, but varies greatly per subspecies. It is a day-flying moth.

== Subspecies ==
- Cerace stipatana stipatana (India: Sylhet, Assam, Khasia Hills; China: Chung King)
- Cerace stipatana birmensis Diakonoff, 1950 (Burma)
- Cerace stipatana clara Diakonoff, 1950 (India)
- Cerace stipatana exul Diakonoff, 1950 (China: Chusan Island)
- Cerace stipatana formosana Diakonoff, 1950 (Formosa, Koshum)
- Cerace stipatana nepalensis Diakonoff, 1976 (Nepal)
- Cerace stipatana sinensis Diakonoff, 1950 (China: Ichang, Chang Yang)
