= Cerace sardias =

Scientific classification
- Kingdom: Animalia
- Phylum: Arthropoda
- Clade: Pancrustacea
- Class: Insecta
- Order: Lepidoptera
- Family: Tortricidae
- Genus: Cerace
- Species: C. sardias

Binomial name
- Cerace sardias Meyrick, 1907

Species of moth

Cerace sardias is a species of moth of the family Tortricidae. It is found in Assam, India.

The wingspan is 40–42 mm (1.6–1.7 in).
