= Cerace loxodes =

Scientific classification
- Kingdom: Animalia
- Phylum: Arthropoda
- Class: Insecta
- Order: Lepidoptera
- Family: Tortricidae
- Genus: Cerace
- Species: C. loxodes

Binomial name
- Cerace loxodes Meyrick, 1912

Species of moth

Cerace loxodes is a species of moth of the family Tortricidae. It is found in Tenasserim, India.

The wingspan is about 52 mm. The forewings are dark coppery purple fuscous with an orange-red apical blotch and numerous ochreous-white dots and round spots. The hindwings are orange with a dark purple-fuscous blotch.
