= Bathypluta =

Scientific classification
- Domain: Eukaryota
- Kingdom: Animalia
- Phylum: Arthropoda
- Class: Insecta
- Order: Lepidoptera
- Family: Tortricidae
- Tribe: Ceracini
- Genus: Bathypluta; Diakonoff, 1950

Genus of tortrix moths

Bathypluta is a genus of moths belonging to the subfamily Tortricinae of the family Tortricidae.

== Species ==
- Bathypluta metoeca Diakonoff, 1950
- Bathypluta triphaenella (Snellen, 1903)

== See also ==
- List of Tortricidae genera
