= Cerace cyanopyga =

Scientific classification
- Domain: Eukaryota
- Kingdom: Animalia
- Phylum: Arthropoda
- Class: Insecta
- Order: Lepidoptera
- Family: Tortricidae
- Genus: Cerace
- Species: C. cyanopyga

Binomial name
- Cerace cyanopyga Diakonoff, 1950

Species of moth

Cerace cyanopyga is a species of moth of the family Tortricidae. It is found in Burma.
