= Pentacitrotus maculatus =

Scientific classification
- Kingdom: Animalia
- Phylum: Arthropoda
- Class: Insecta
- Order: Lepidoptera
- Family: Tortricidae
- Genus: Pentacitrotus
- Species: P. maculatus

Binomial name
- Pentacitrotus maculatus Kawabe, 1993

Species of moth

Pentacitrotus maculatus is a species of moth of the family Tortricidae. It is found in Nepal.
