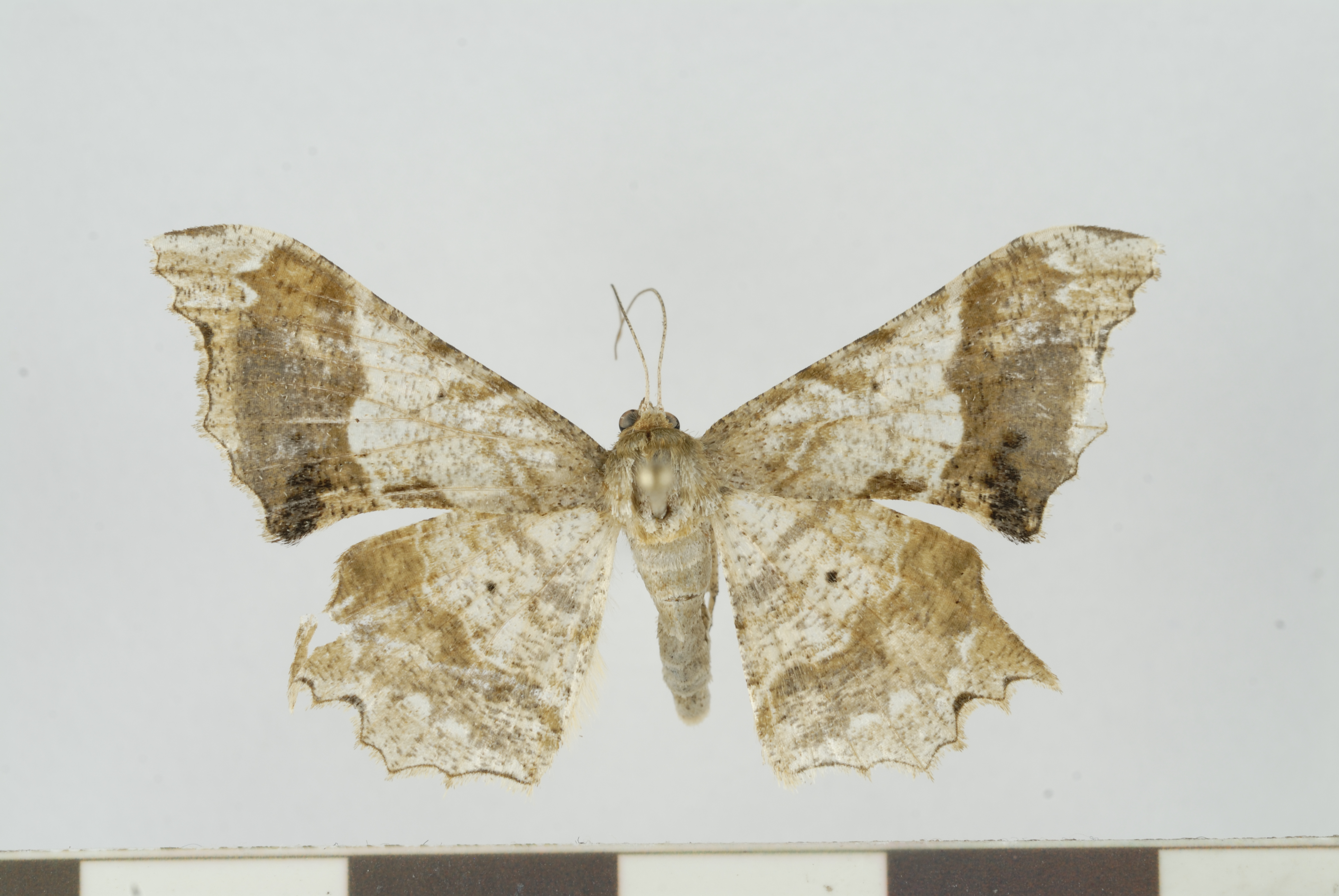

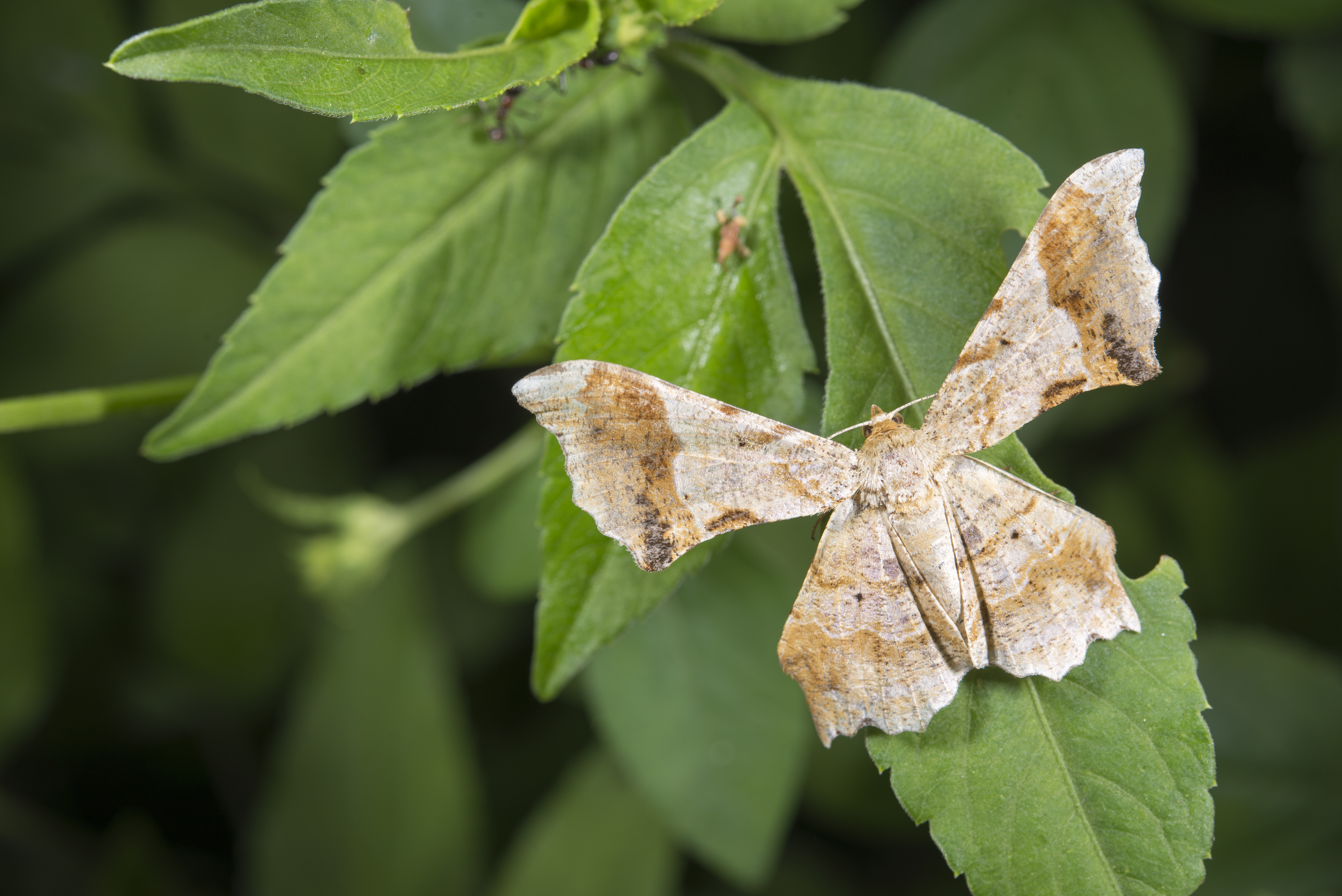

Scientific classification
- Domain: Eukaryota
- Kingdom: Animalia
- Phylum: Arthropoda
- Class: Insecta
- Order: Lepidoptera
- Family: Geometridae
- Genus: Krananda
- Species: K. oliveomarginata

Binomial name
- Krananda oliveomarginata C. Swinhoe, 1894

Synonyms
- Krananda nicolasi Herbulot, 1987

= Krananda oliveomarginata =

Species of moth

Krananda oliveomarginata is a moth in the family Geometridae first described by Charles Swinhoe in 1894. It is found in the north-eastern Himalayas, China, Taiwan, northern Vietnam, Thailand and on Peninsular Malaysia, Sumatra and Borneo.
