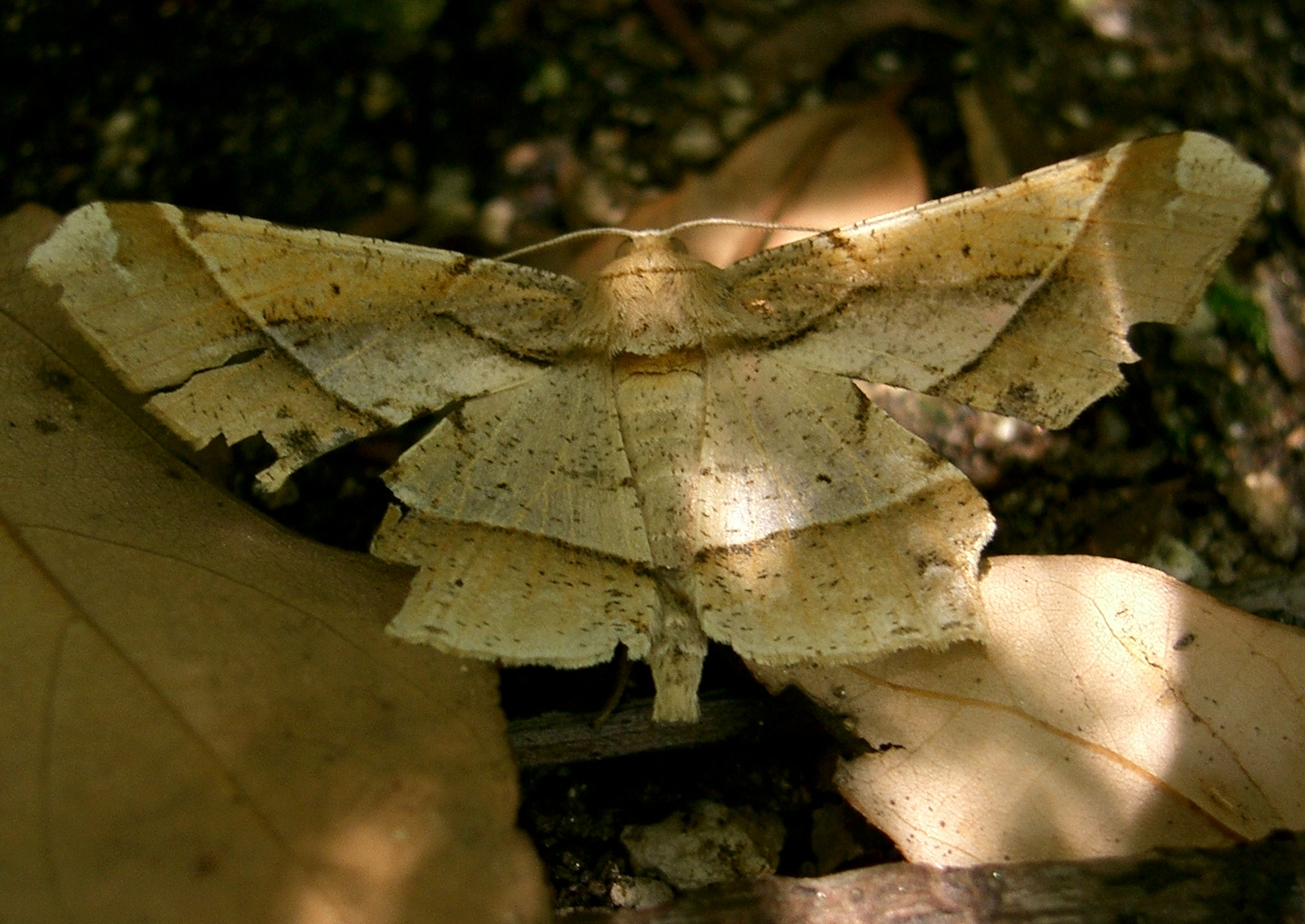

Scientific classification
- Domain: Eukaryota
- Kingdom: Animalia
- Phylum: Arthropoda
- Class: Insecta
- Order: Lepidoptera
- Family: Geometridae
- Genus: Krananda
- Species: K. latimarginaria

Binomial name
- Krananda latimarginaria (Leech, 1891)

Synonyms
- Krananda latimarginaria Leech, 1891

= Trigonoptila latimarginaria =

Species of moth

Trigonoptila latimarginaria is a moth of the family Geometridae first described by John Henry Leech in 1891. It is found in Japan, the Korean Peninsula, Taiwan and China.

The wingspan is 33–40 mm. There are five generations per year.

The larvae feed on Cinnamomum species and are considered a serious pest in China.
