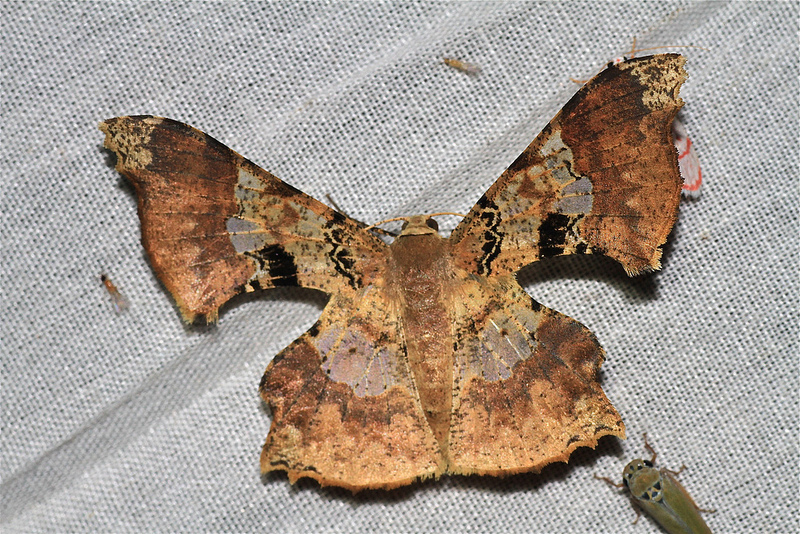
- Borneo, Trusmadi lower montane dipterocarp forest

Scientific classification
- Domain: Eukaryota
- Kingdom: Animalia
- Phylum: Arthropoda
- Class: Insecta
- Order: Lepidoptera
- Family: Geometridae
- Genus: Krananda
- Species: K. lucidaria

Binomial name
- Krananda lucidaria Leech, 1897

= Krananda lucidaria =

Species of moth

Krananda lucidaria is a geometer moth in the subfamily Ennominae first described by John Henry Leech in 1897. It is found in Western and Southern China, Northern Thailand, Peninsular Malaysia, Sumatra, and Borneo in lower montane forests.
