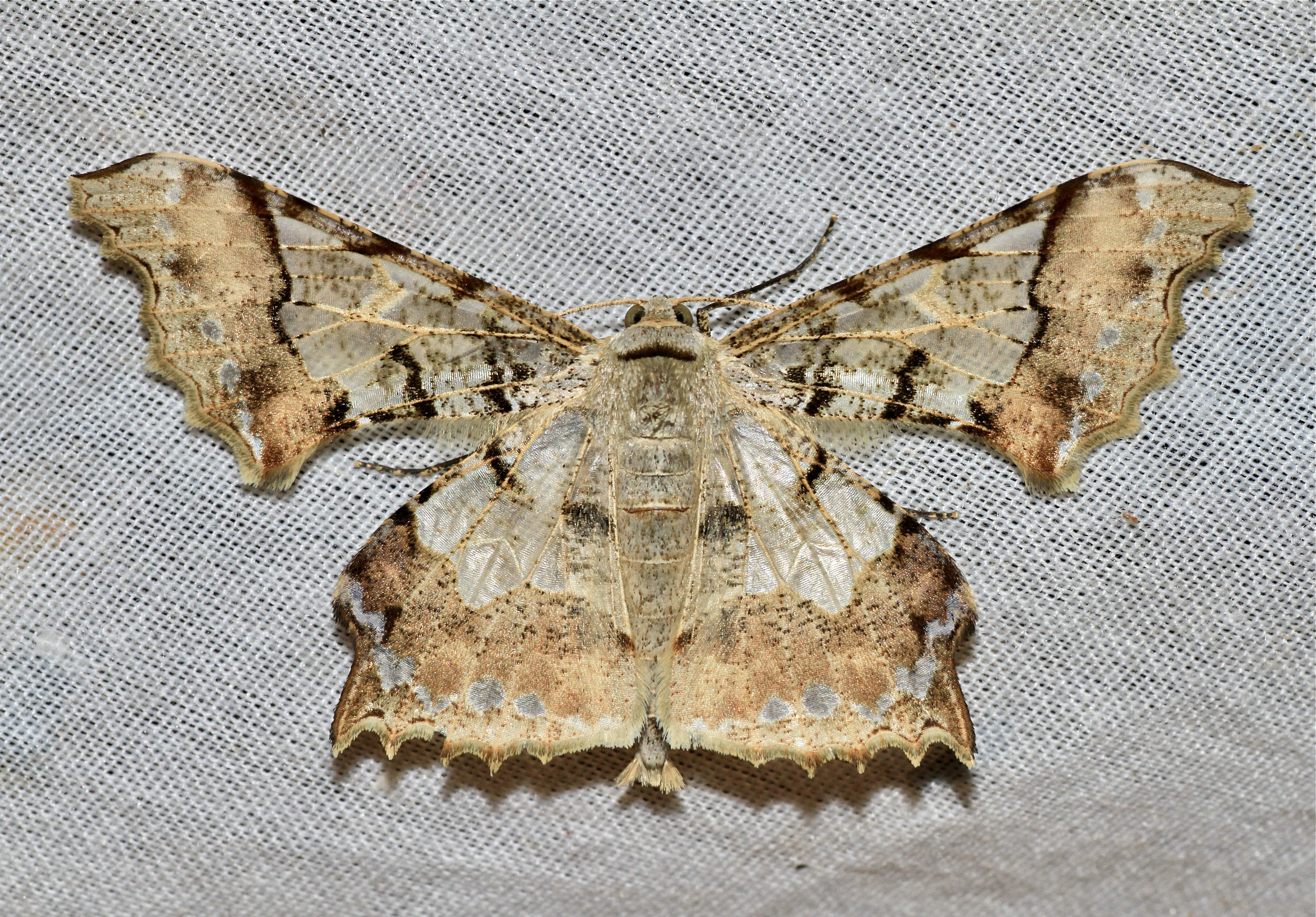
- Krananda semihyalina (male) in Trusmadi area, Borneo.

Scientific classification
- Domain: Eukaryota
- Kingdom: Animalia
- Phylum: Arthropoda
- Class: Insecta
- Order: Lepidoptera
- Family: Geometridae
- Genus: Krananda
- Species: K. semihyalina

Binomial name
- Krananda semihyalina Moore, [1868]

Synonyms
- Krananda vitraria Felder & Rogenhofer, 1875

= Krananda semihyalina =

Species of moth

Krananda semihyalina is a moth of the family Geometridae first described by Frederic Moore in 1868. It is found from the Oriental tropics to Japan, Sulawesi and the southern Moluccas.

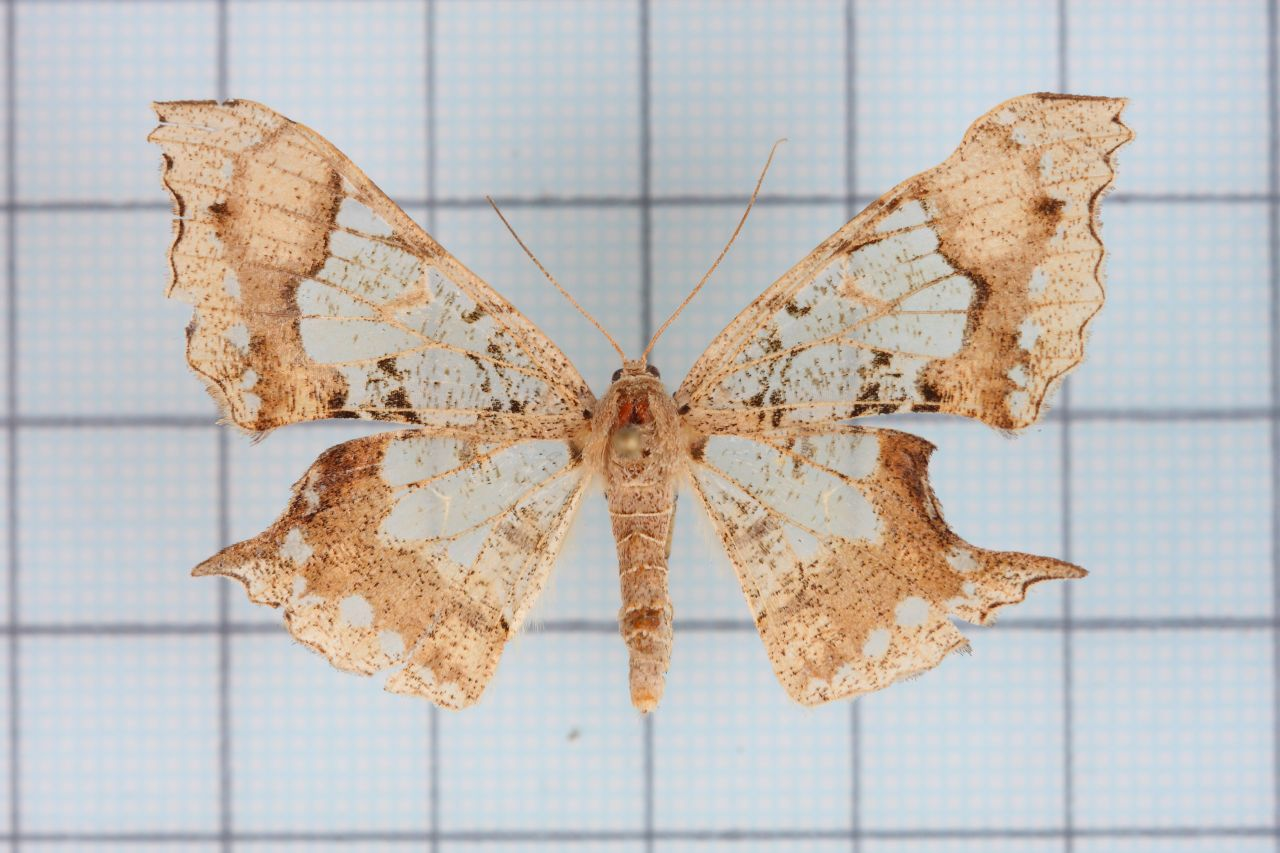
Female

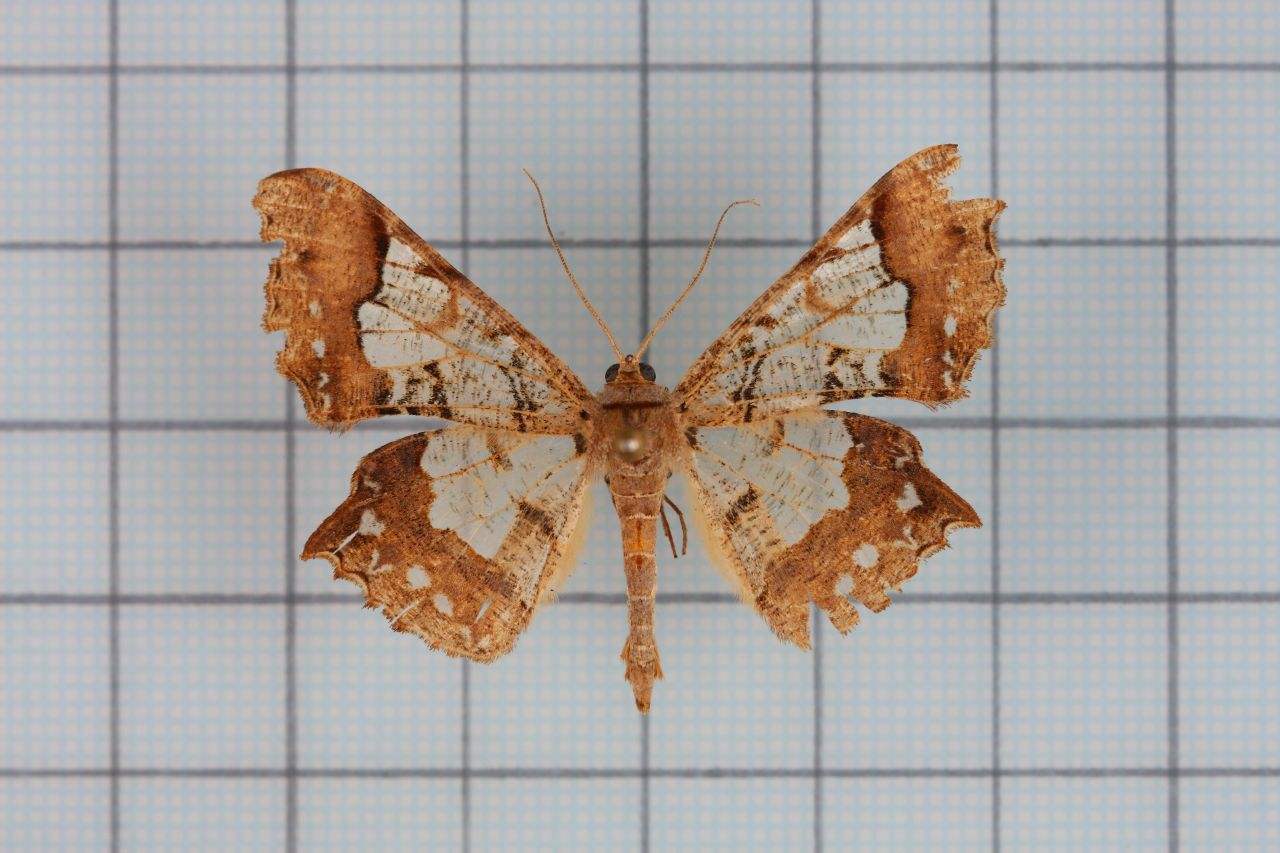
Male

The wingspan is 39–44 mm.
