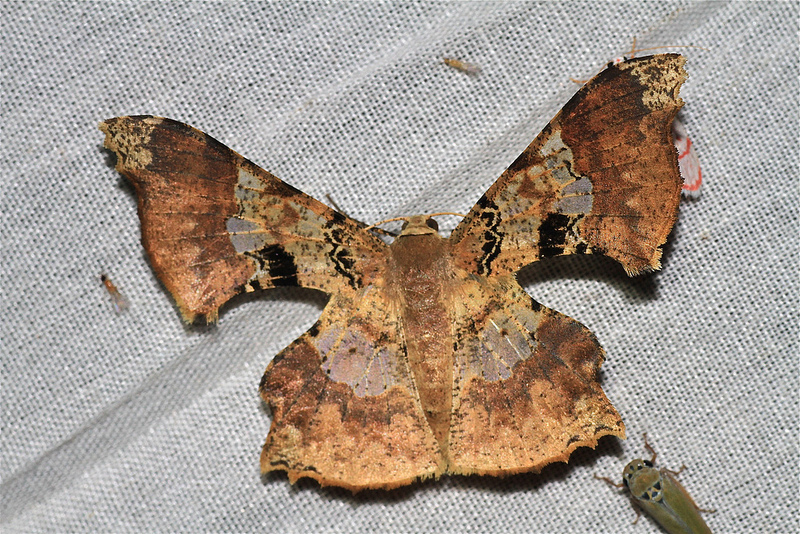
- Krananda lucidaria from Borneo

Scientific classification
- Domain: Eukaryota
- Kingdom: Animalia
- Phylum: Arthropoda
- Class: Insecta
- Order: Lepidoptera
- Family: Geometridae
- Tribe: Boarmiini
- Genus: Krananda; Moore, [1868]

Type species
- Trigonoptila latimarginaria Leech, 1891

Synonyms
- Trigonoptila Warren, 1894

= Krananda =

Genus of moths

Krananda is a genus of moths in the family Geometridae described by Frederic Moore in 1868.

== Species ==
- Krananda diversa Warren, 1894
- Krananda extranotata Prout, 1926
- Krananda latimarginaria Leech, 1891
- Krananda lucidaria Leech, 1897
- Krananda nepalensis Yazaki, 1992
- Krananda oliveomarginata C. Swinhoe, 1894
- Krananda orthotmeta Prout, 1926
- Krananda peristena Wehrli, 1938
- Krananda postexcisa (Wehrli, 1924)
- Krananda semihyalina Moore, 1868
