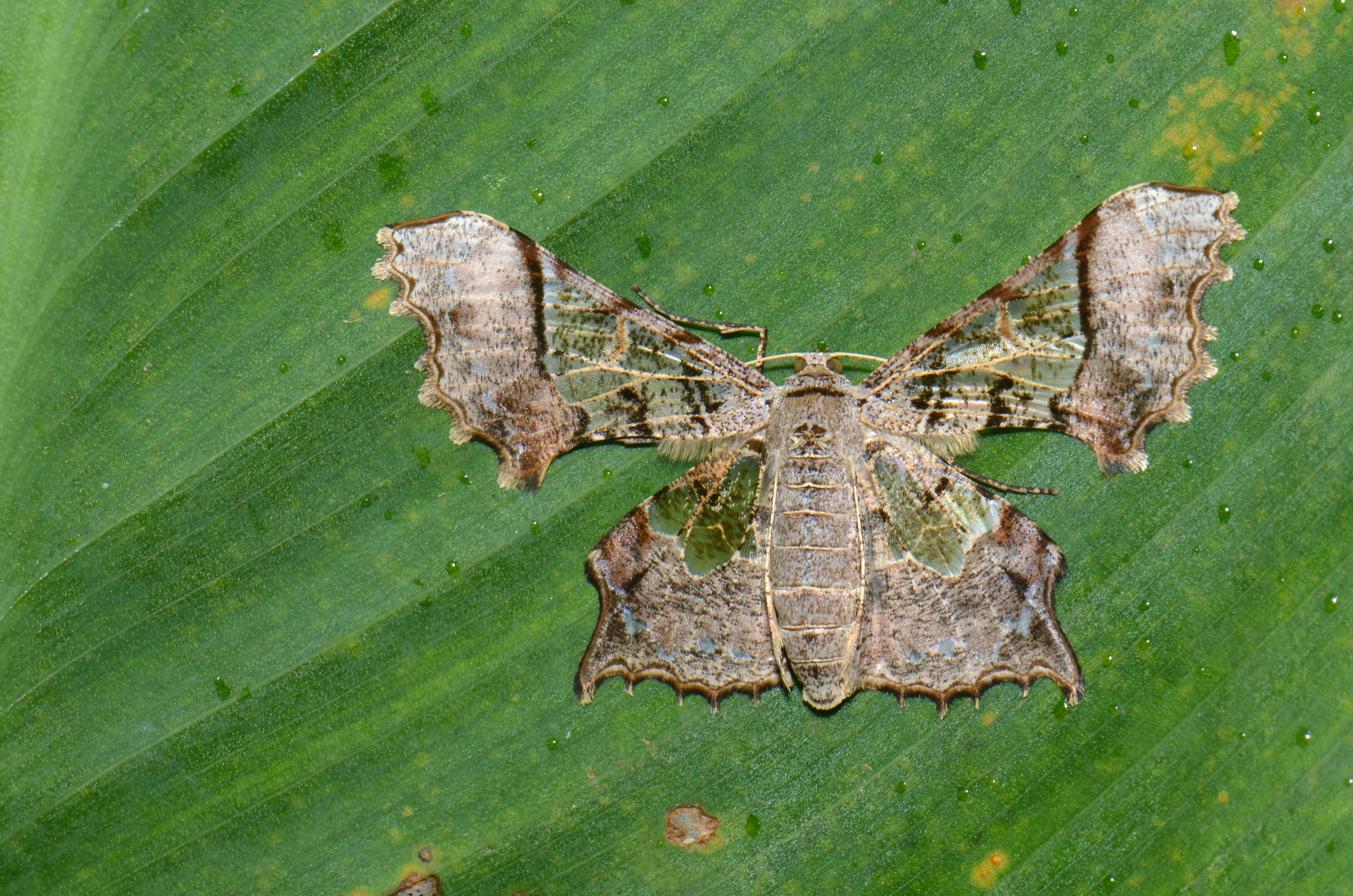

Scientific classification
- Domain: Eukaryota
- Kingdom: Animalia
- Phylum: Arthropoda
- Class: Insecta
- Order: Lepidoptera
- Family: Geometridae
- Genus: Krananda
- Species: K. extranotata

Binomial name
- Krananda extranotata (L.B. Prout 1926)

= Krananda extranotata =

Species of moth

Krananda extranotata is a moth in the subtribe Boarmiini of the family Geometridae first described by Louis Beethoven Prout in 1926, from specimens collected in Dutch New Guinea (Irianjaya), in the central Arfak mountains.
