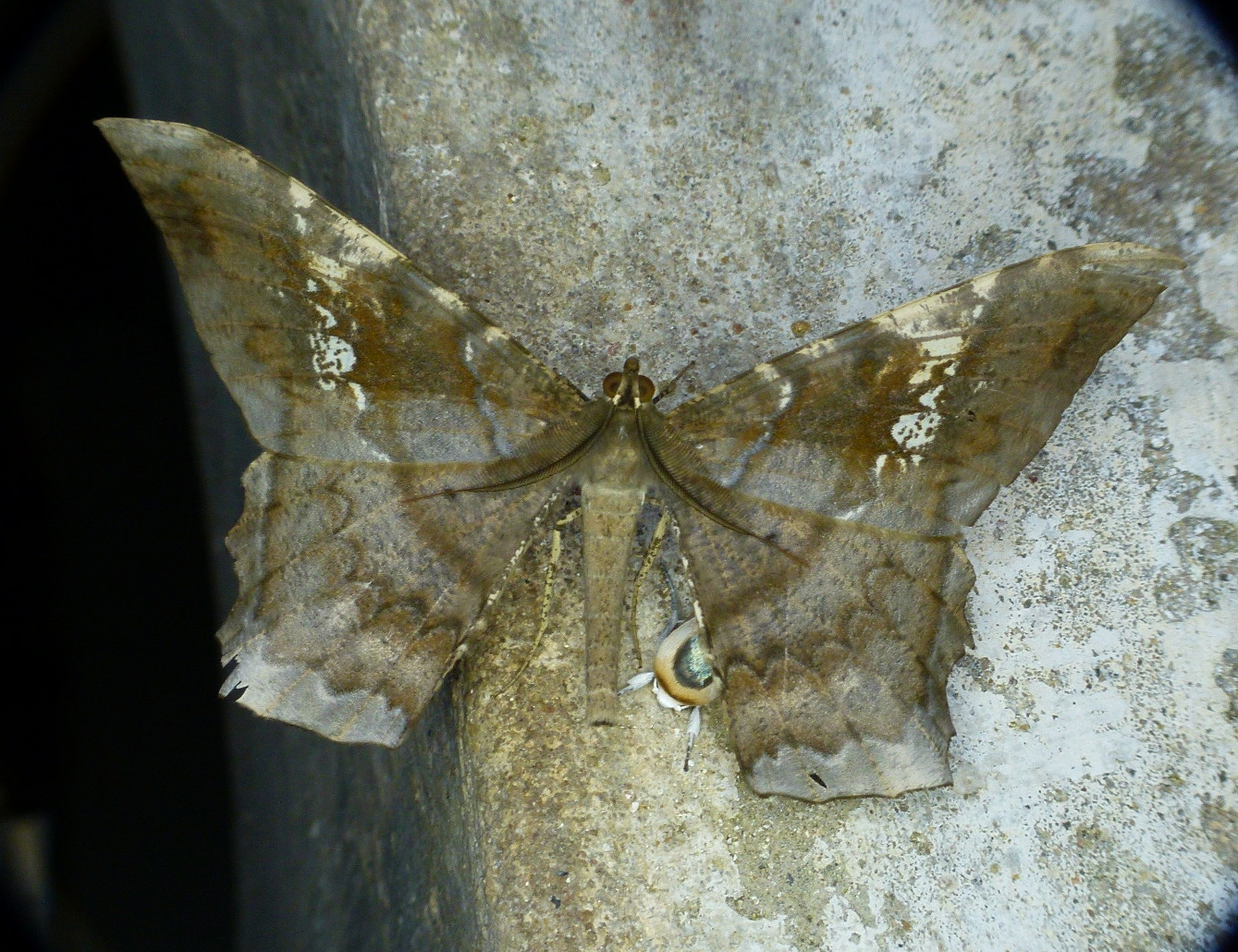
- Amblychia angeronaria

Scientific classification
- Kingdom: Animalia
- Phylum: Arthropoda
- Class: Insecta
- Order: Lepidoptera
- Family: Geometridae
- Tribe: Boarmiini
- Genus: Amblychia; Guenée in Boisduval & Guenée, 1857

Synonyms
- Elphos Guenée, 1857

= Amblychia =

Genus of geometer moths

Amblychia is a genus of moths in the family Geometridae described by Achille Guenée in 1857.

== Description ==
Palpi upturned, reaching vertex of head and fringed with long hair in front. Antenna of male usually bipectinated with long branches to three-fourths length. Hind tibia usually dilated and with a tuft of hair from base on inner side. Forewings of male with fovea. Apex somewhat acute and produced. Vein 3 from before angle of cell and veins 7 to 9 stalked from before upper angle. Vein 11 free. Hindwings with produced outer margin at vein 4. Vein 3 from before angle of cell.

== Species ==
- Amblychia angeronaria Guenée, 1857
- Amblychia cavimargo (Prout, 1925)
- Amblychia hymenaria (Guenée, 1857)
- Amblychia infoveata Prout, 1932
- Amblychia lutulenta (West)
- Amblychia moltrechti (Bastelberger, 1909)
- Amblychia nimia (Prout, 1925)
- Amblychia pardicelata (Walker, [1863])
- Amblychia praeumbrata (Warren, 1893)
- Amblychia sauteri (Prout, 1914)
- Amblychia sommereri Holloway, 1993
- Amblychia subrubida (Warren, 1896)
- Amblychia torrida Moore

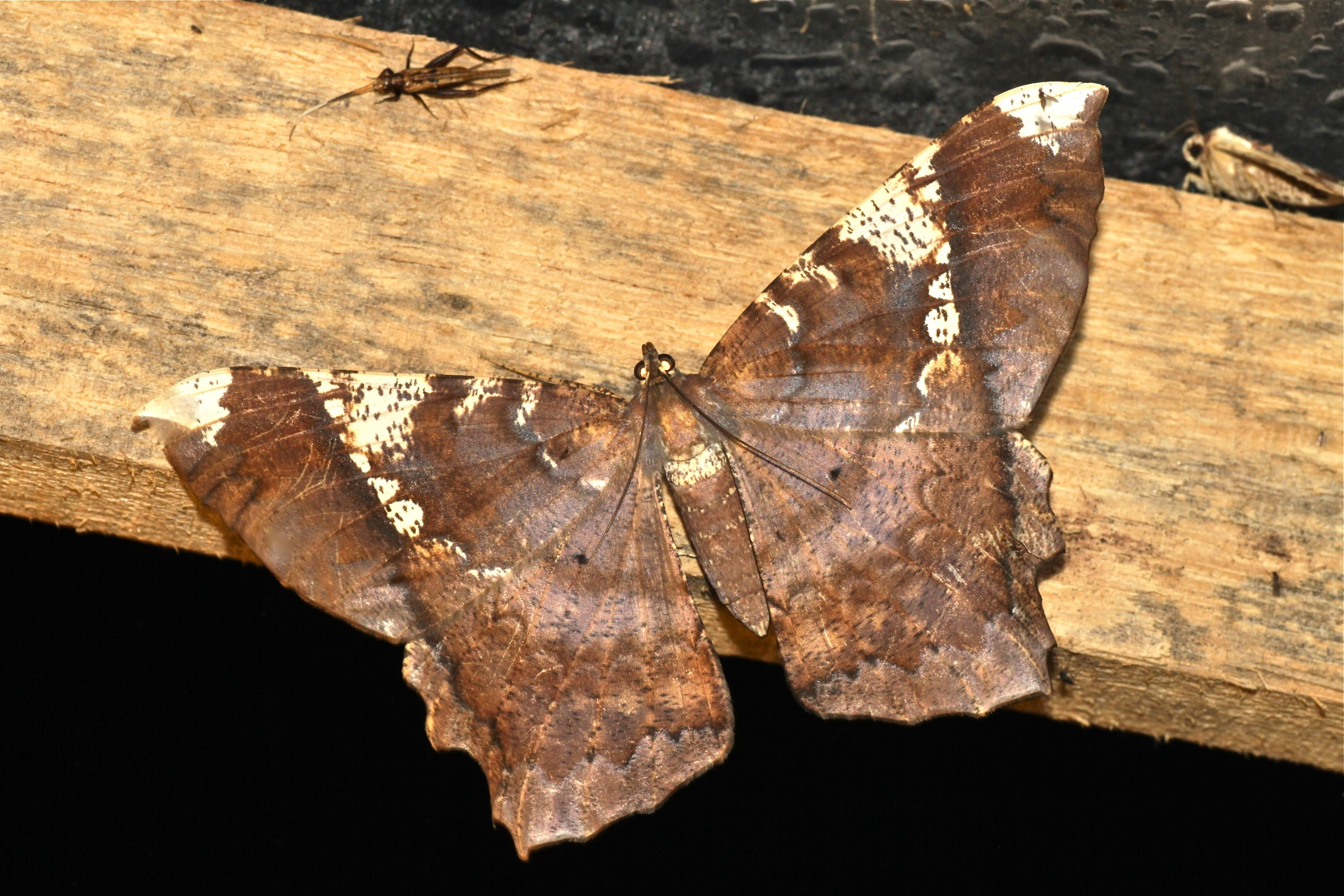
Female
