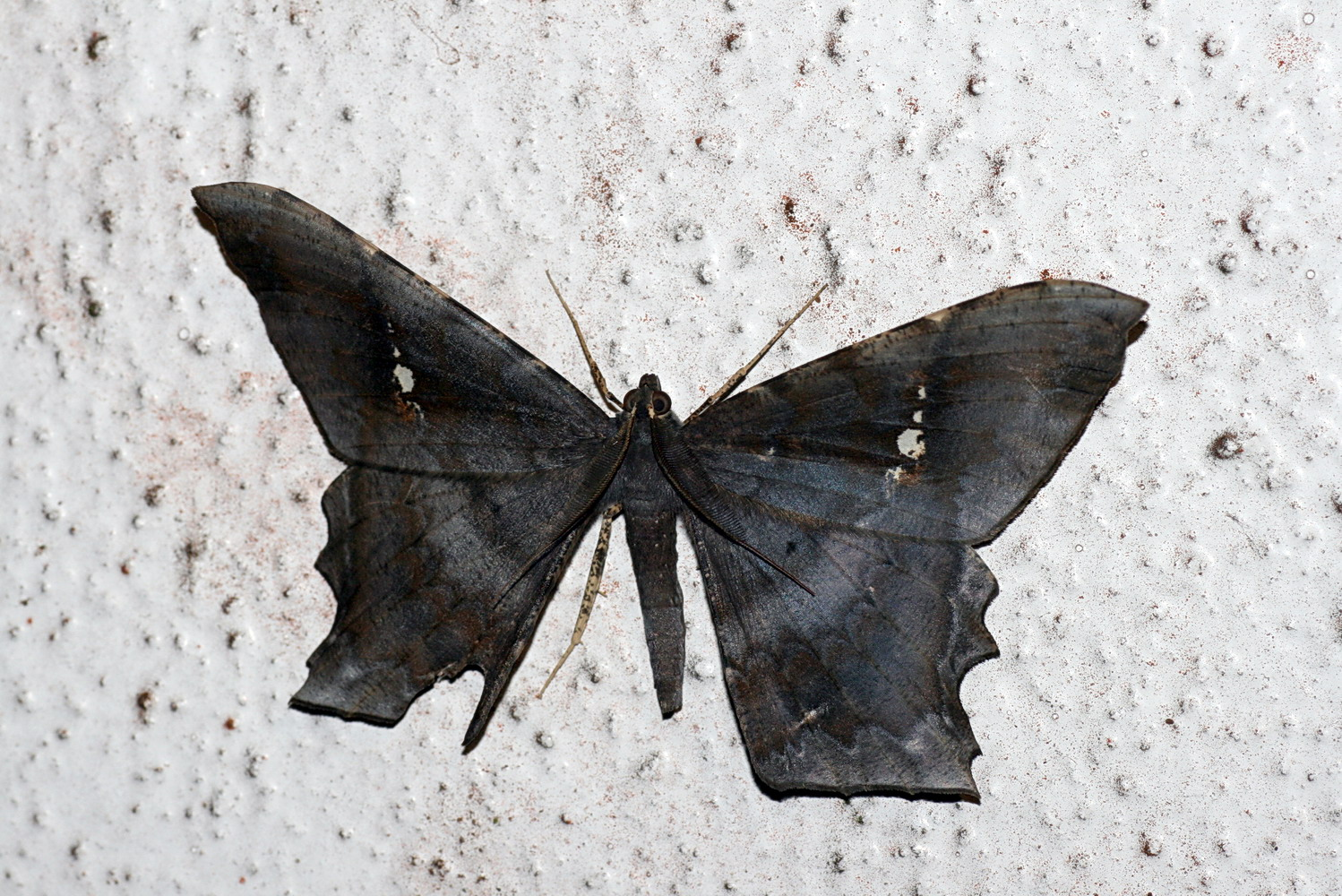

Scientific classification
- Kingdom: Animalia
- Phylum: Arthropoda
- Clade: Pancrustacea
- Class: Insecta
- Order: Lepidoptera
- Family: Geometridae
- Subfamily: Ennominae
- Tribe: Boarmiini
- Genus: Amblychia
- Species: A. infoveata

Binomial name
- Amblychia infoveata Prout, 1932

Synonyms
- Omiza patularia Walker, 1860

= Amblychia infoveata =

Species of moth

Amblychia infoveata is a moth in the family Geometridae. It is found in Borneo, Peninsular Malaysia and Sumatra.

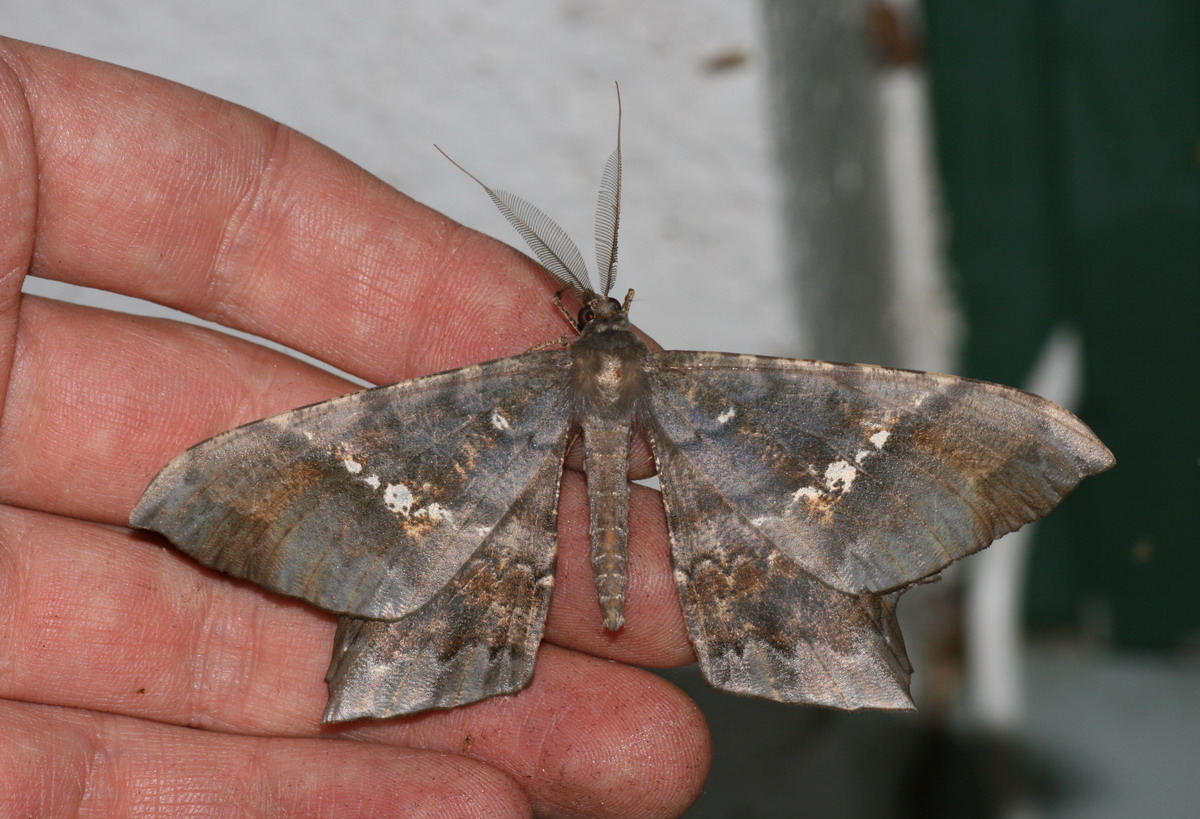
