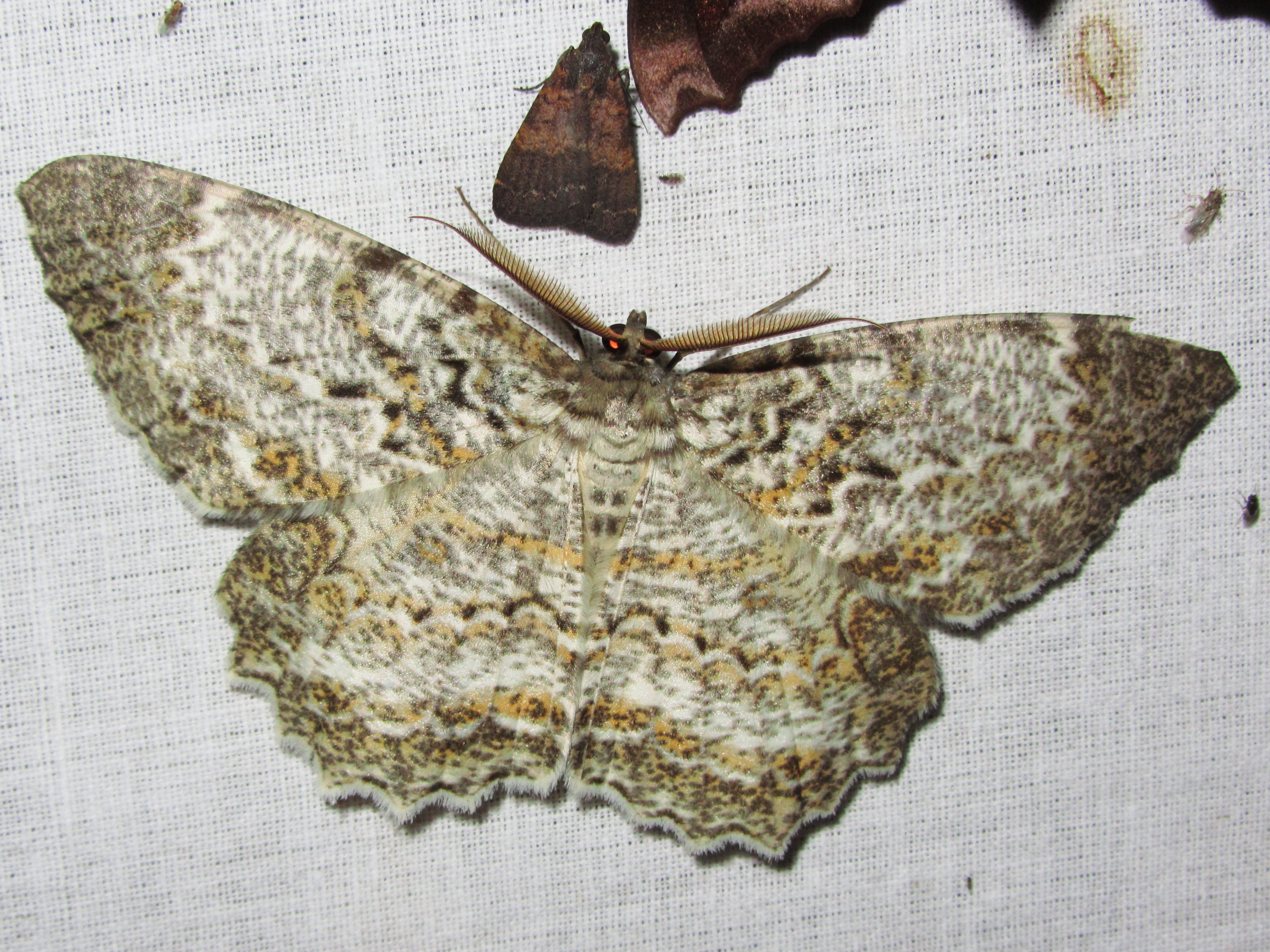
- Male

Scientific classification
- Kingdom: Animalia
- Phylum: Arthropoda
- Class: Insecta
- Order: Lepidoptera
- Family: Geometridae
- Genus: Amblychia
- Species: A. hymenaria

Binomial name
- Amblychia hymenaria (Guenée, 1858)

Synonyms
- Elphos hymenaria Guenée, 1857; Ephos brabanti Thierry-Mieg, 1893; Elphos albifascia Warren, 1894; Elphos obliterata Warren, 1894; Elphos procellosa Warren, 1894

= Amblychia hymenaria =

Species of moth

Amblychia hymenaria is a moth of the family Geometridae first described by Achille Guenée in 1858. It is found in India, Singapore, Sundaland, Sulawesi, Nepal, Bangladesh, Malaysia and may be in Sri Lanka.

The wingspan of the female is 42 mm. The male has bipectinate (comb-like on both sides) antennae, and the female has filiform (thread-like) antennae. Both sexes have brownish wings with white dots and irrorations (speckles). However, in the male, the diffuse, oblique band which cross the forewing from the center of the costa to the tornal angle is off white, and it is white in female. The caterpillar is known to feed on Cinnamomum iners.
