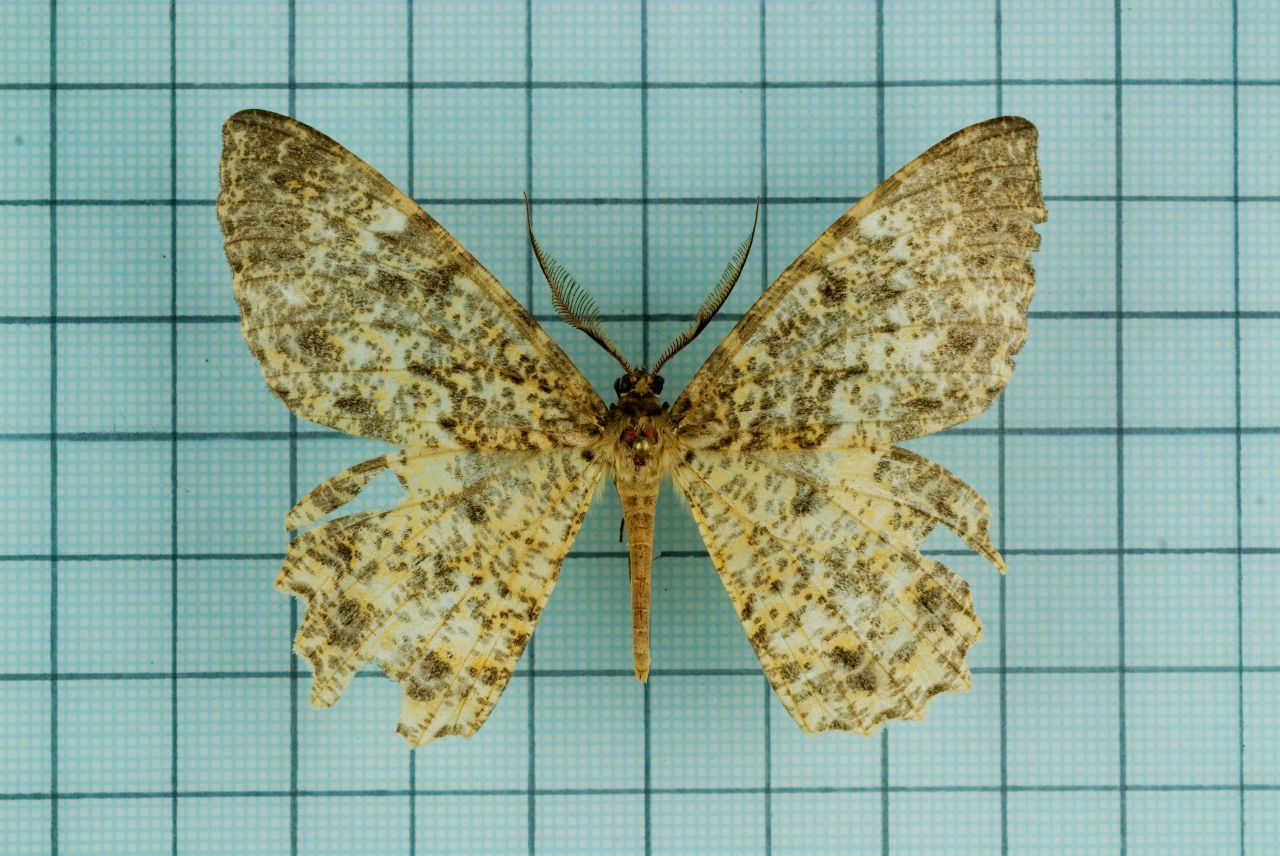

Scientific classification
- Kingdom: Animalia
- Phylum: Arthropoda
- Class: Insecta
- Order: Lepidoptera
- Family: Geometridae
- Subfamily: Ennominae
- Tribe: Boarmiini
- Genus: Amblychia
- Species: A. moltrechti

Binomial name
- Amblychia moltrechti (Bastelberger, 1909)

Synonyms
- Elphos moltrechti Bastelberger, 1909

= Amblychia moltrechti =

Species of moth

Amblychia moltrechti is a moth of the family Geometridae. It is found in south-east Asia, including Borneo and Taiwan. The species name is after the collector Arnold Moltrecht.
