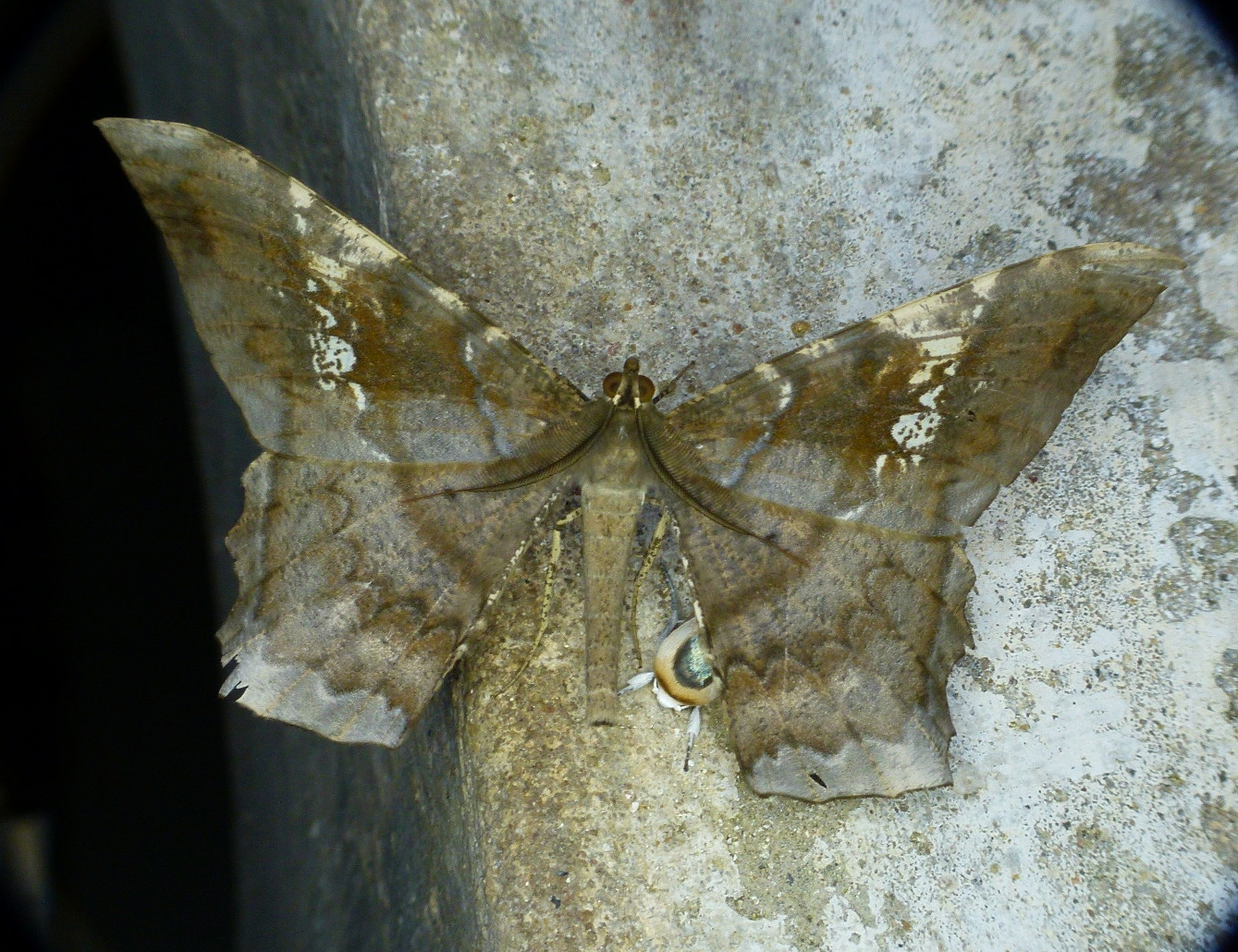
- Male

Scientific classification
- Kingdom: Animalia
- Phylum: Arthropoda
- Class: Insecta
- Order: Lepidoptera
- Family: Geometridae
- Genus: Amblychia
- Species: A. angeronaria

Binomial name
- Amblychia angeronaria Guenée, [1858]

Synonyms
- Amblychia sinibia Wehrli, 1938; Amblychia torrida Moore, 1877

= Amblychia angeronaria =

Species of moth

Amblychia angeronaria is a moth of the family Geometridae first described by Achille Guenée in 1858. It is found in Sri Lanka, northern India, Korea, Andaman Islands to Taiwan, Borneo, Sumatra, Korea Japan and Australia.

The species' wingspan is about 90 mm. Male has bipectinate antennae whereas female has filiform antennae. Male has pale brownish wings often mottled with ochreous. Fovea present. Body and legs of both sexes are covered with yellowish-white hairs.

Female also mottled in some extent with orange-brown wings. Medial fasciae narrow and clearly defined. Margin of the hindwing is more strongly and broadly excavate. Underside of wings is pale brownish. The caterpillar is ochreous with cinnamon-grey-brown suffusion. Caterpillars feed on Lauraceae plants.
