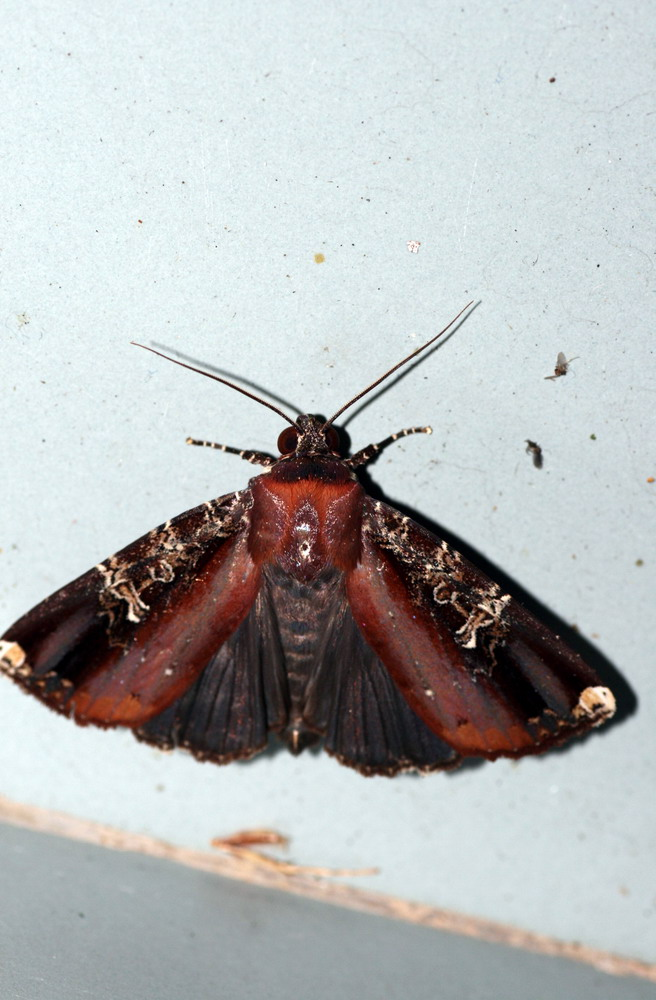
- Callyna semivitta

Scientific classification
- Kingdom: Animalia
- Phylum: Arthropoda
- Class: Insecta
- Order: Lepidoptera
- Superfamily: Noctuoidea
- Family: Noctuidae
- Tribe: Dypterygiini
- Genus: Callyna; Guenée, 1852

Synonyms
- Akonus Matsumura, 1929

= Callyna =

Genus of moths

Callyna is a genus of moths of the family Noctuidae.

== Description ==
Palpi slender and closely appressed to frons, where the third joint reaching just above vertex of head. Antennae of male minutely ciliated. Thorax and abdomen smoothly scaled. Forewings nearly even breadth throughout. The apex and outer margin rounded. Hindwings with vein 5 from below center of discocellulars.

== Species ==
- Callyna contrastans Hampson, 1914
- Callyna costiplaga Moore, 1885
- Callyna cupricolor Hampson, 1902
- Callyna decora Walker, 1858
- Callyna figurans Walker, 1858
- Callyna gaedei Hacker & Fibiger, 2006
- Callyna holophaea Hampson, 1911
- Callyna jugaria Walker, 1858
- Callyna laurae Bryk, 1915
- Callyna leuconota Lower, 1903
- Callyna leucosticha Turner, 1911
- Callyna monoleuca Walker, 1858
- Callyna nigerrima Hampson, 1902
- Callyna obscura Hampson, 1910
- Callyna pectinicornis Gaede, 1915
- Callyna perfecta Berio, 1956
- Callyna robinsoni Viette, 1965
- Callyna semivitta Moore, 1882
- Callyna trisagittata Berio, 1970
- Callyna unicolor Hampson, 1920
