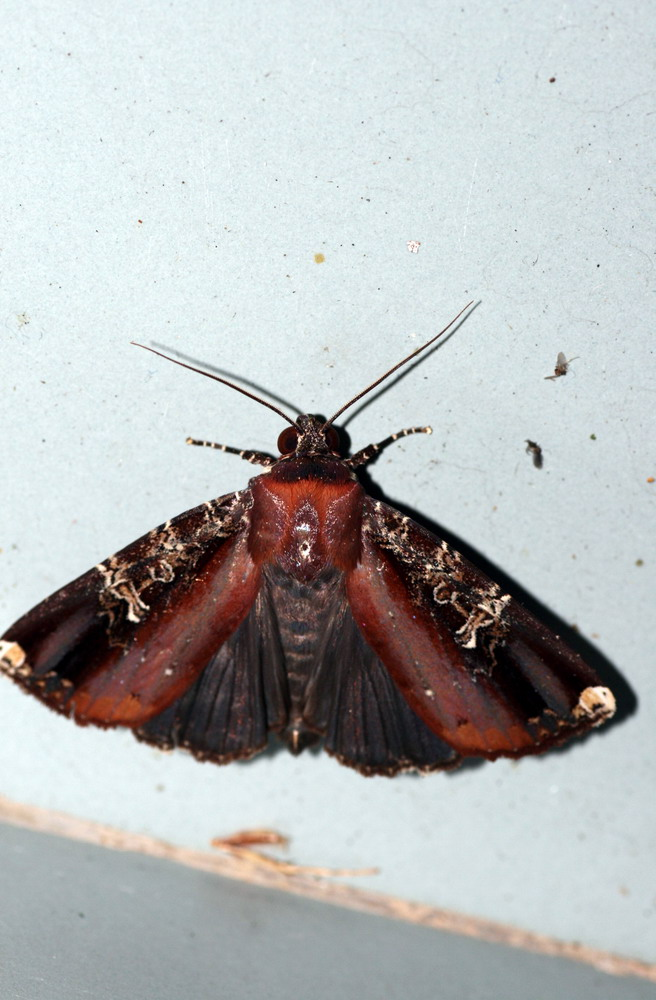

Scientific classification
- Domain: Eukaryota
- Kingdom: Animalia
- Phylum: Arthropoda
- Class: Insecta
- Order: Lepidoptera
- Superfamily: Noctuoidea
- Family: Noctuidae
- Genus: Callyna
- Species: C. semivitta

Binomial name
- Callyna semivitta Moore, 1882

= Callyna semivitta =

Species of moth

Callyna semivitta is a moth of the family Noctuidae first described by Frederic Moore in 1882. It is found in India, Taiwan, Vietnam and Malaysia.
