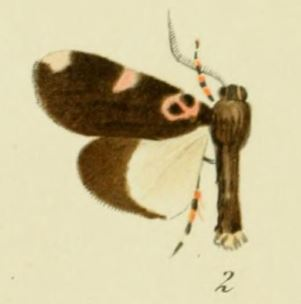

Scientific classification
- Kingdom: Animalia
- Phylum: Arthropoda
- Class: Insecta
- Order: Lepidoptera
- Superfamily: Noctuoidea
- Family: Noctuidae
- Genus: Callyna
- Species: C. laurae

Binomial name
- Callyna laurae Bryk, 1915

= Callyna laurae =

Species of moth

Callyna laurae is a moth of the family Noctuidae.

== Distribution ==
It is found in Equatorial Guinea.
