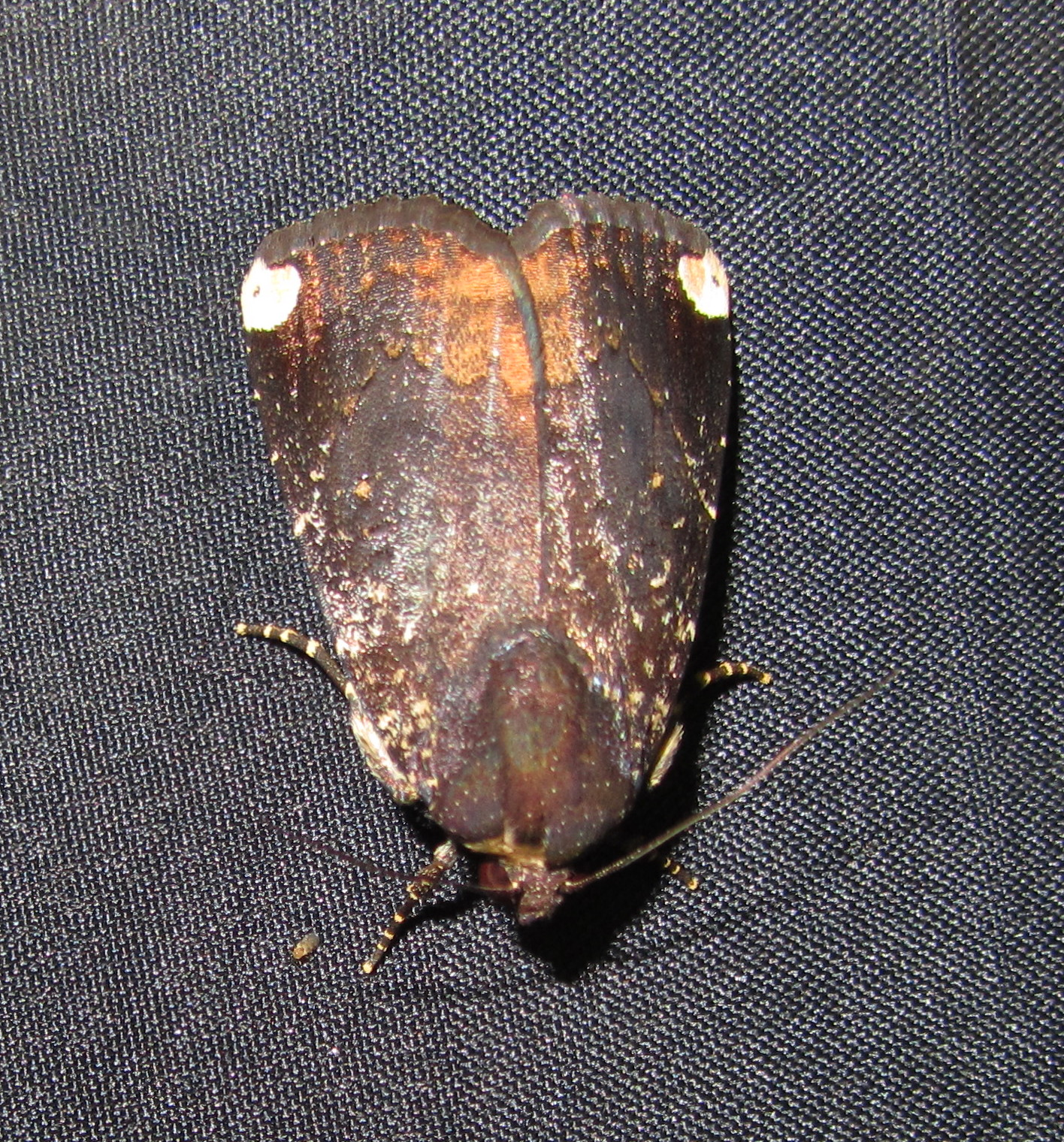

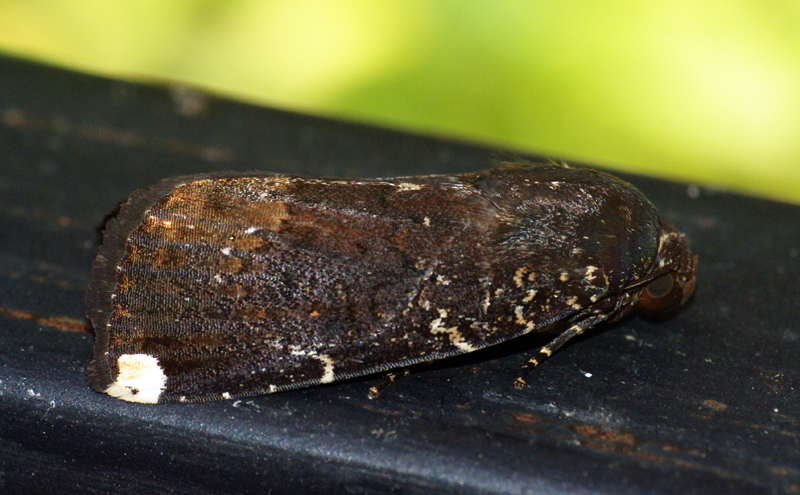

Scientific classification
- Kingdom: Animalia
- Phylum: Arthropoda
- Class: Insecta
- Order: Lepidoptera
- Superfamily: Noctuoidea
- Family: Noctuidae
- Genus: Callyna
- Species: C. monoleuca

Binomial name
- Callyna monoleuca Walker, 1858

= Callyna monoleuca =

Species of moth

Callyna monoleuca is a moth of the family Noctuidae first described by Francis Walker in 1858. It is found in Sri Lanka, India, China, Japan, Taiwan, Myanmar, Indonesia, New Guinea and Australia.

The adult is typically brown. Some adults possess a white spot near the wingtip of each forewing. Underside fawn colored. Some adults have a big yellow patch under each forewing by the base. Larval host plants include Cordia macleodii, Cordia myxa.
