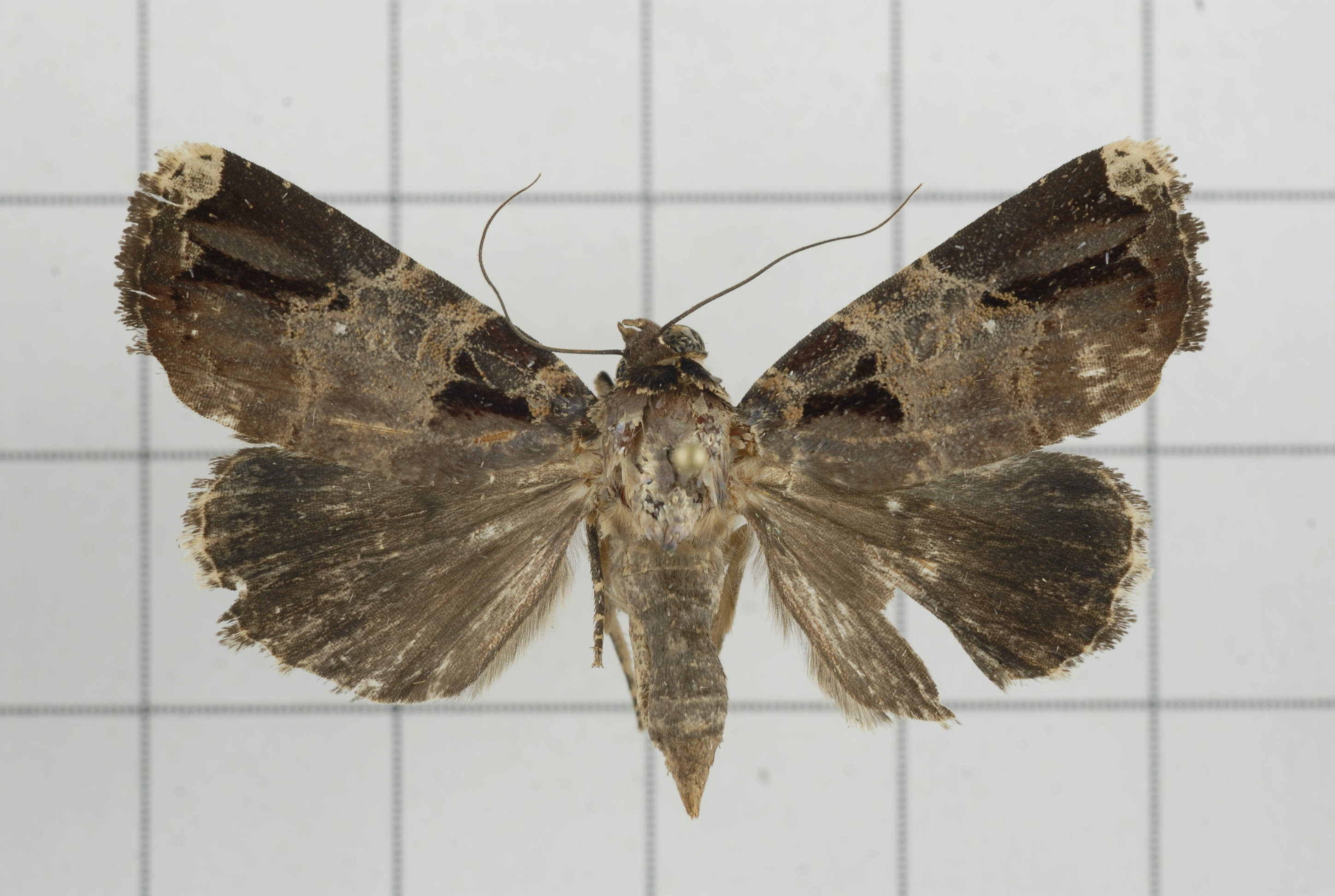

Scientific classification
- Kingdom: Animalia
- Phylum: Arthropoda
- Class: Insecta
- Order: Lepidoptera
- Superfamily: Noctuoidea
- Family: Noctuidae
- Genus: Callyna
- Species: C. jugaria

Binomial name
- Callyna jugaria Walker, 1858

= Callyna jugaria =

Species of moth

Callyna jugaria is a moth of the family Noctuidae first described by Francis Walker in 1858. It is found in Sri Lanka, India, China, Taiwan, Hong Kong and the Philippines.

The wingspan of the adult is 45 mm. Palpi slender. Antennae of male minutely ciliated. Head and thorax purplish red brown. Abdomen fuscous. Thorax and abdomen smoothly scaled. Forewing deep chestnut red with the purplish-grey inner area and a subapical streak. A broad medial ochreous or grey-speckled band is present which is more or less obsolete towards the inner margin. This band is bounded by waved antemedial and postmedial lines. Orbicular and reniform spots present. Apical white patch is found. Hindwing fuscous.

Larval host plants include Cordia myxa and Cordia macleodii.
