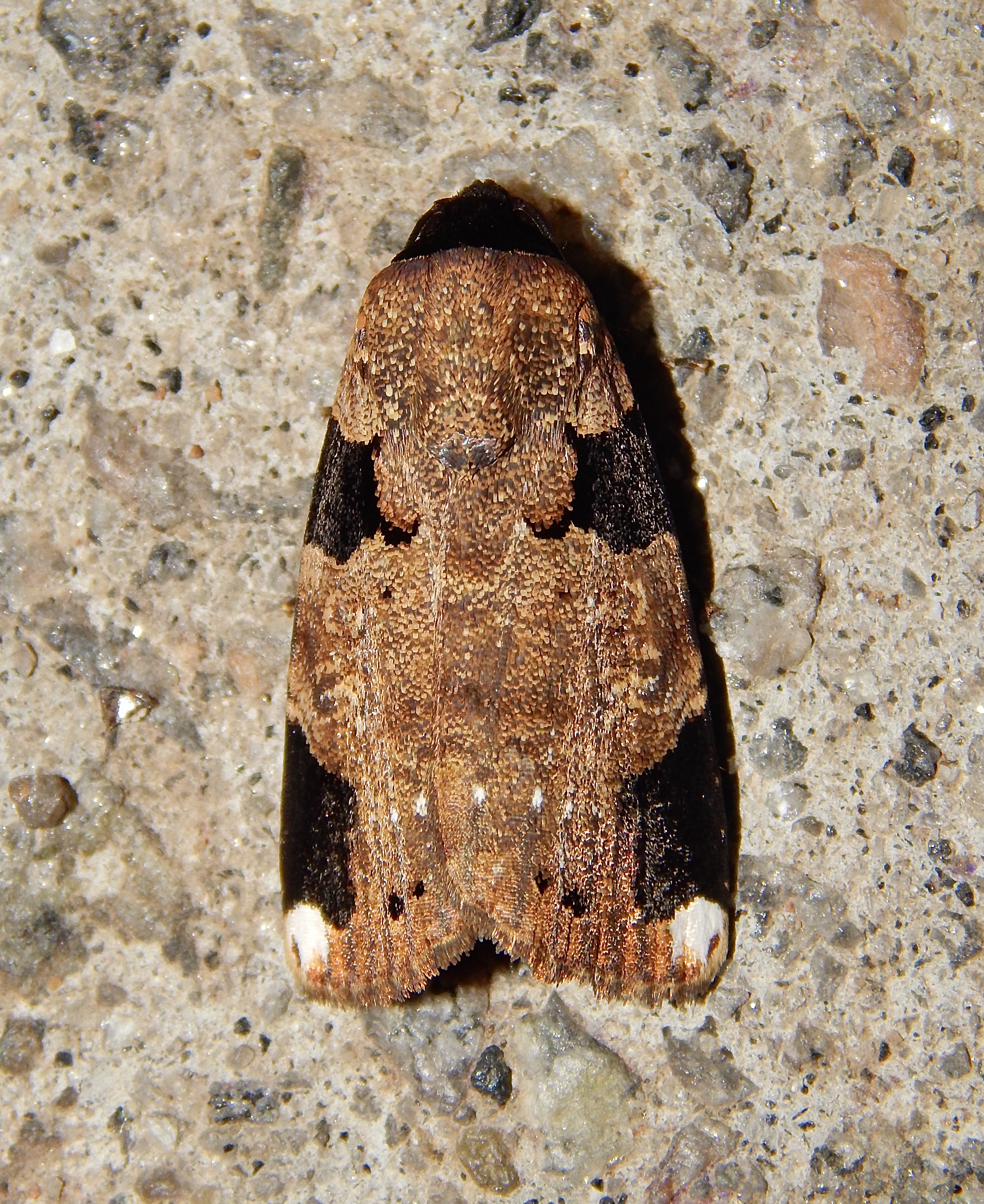

Scientific classification
- Domain: Eukaryota
- Kingdom: Animalia
- Phylum: Arthropoda
- Class: Insecta
- Order: Lepidoptera
- Superfamily: Noctuoidea
- Family: Noctuidae
- Genus: Callyna
- Species: C. costiplaga

Binomial name
- Callyna costiplaga Moore, 1885

= Callyna costiplaga =

Species of moth

Callyna costiplaga is a moth of the family Noctuidae first described by Frederic Moore in 1885. It is found in India, Sri Lanka and China.

Adult wingspan is 43 mm. Palpi slender. Antennae ciliated in both sexes. Head dark reddish brown with a black collar. Thorax and abdomen brownish. Forewings brown with indistinct subbasal, antemedial, postmedial and submarginal waved lines. There are large quadrate black costal patches found between the subbasal and antemedial as well as the postmedial and submarginal lines. Orbicular and reniform indistinct. An apical white patch found. Hindwings dark fuscous with ochreous cilia.
