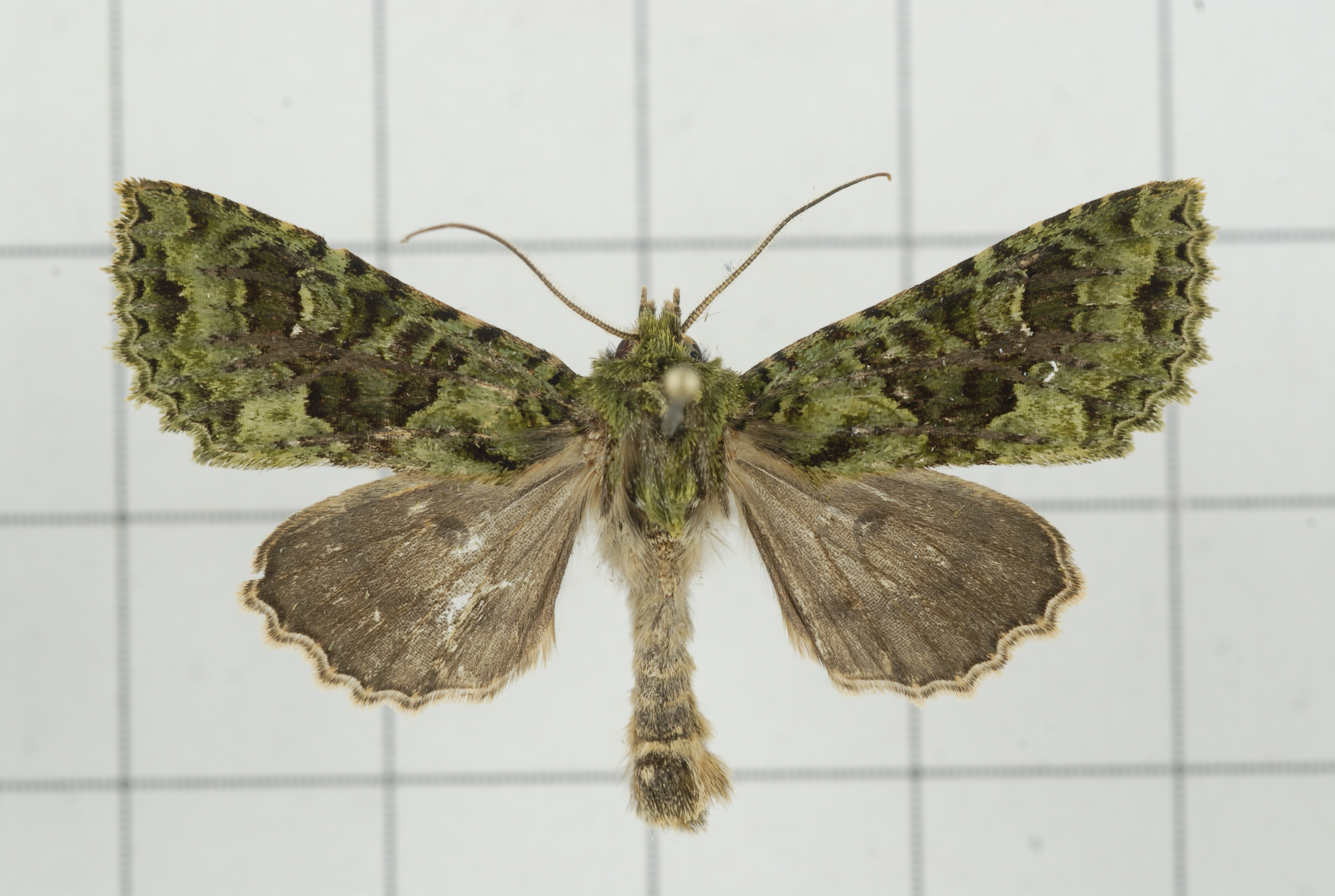

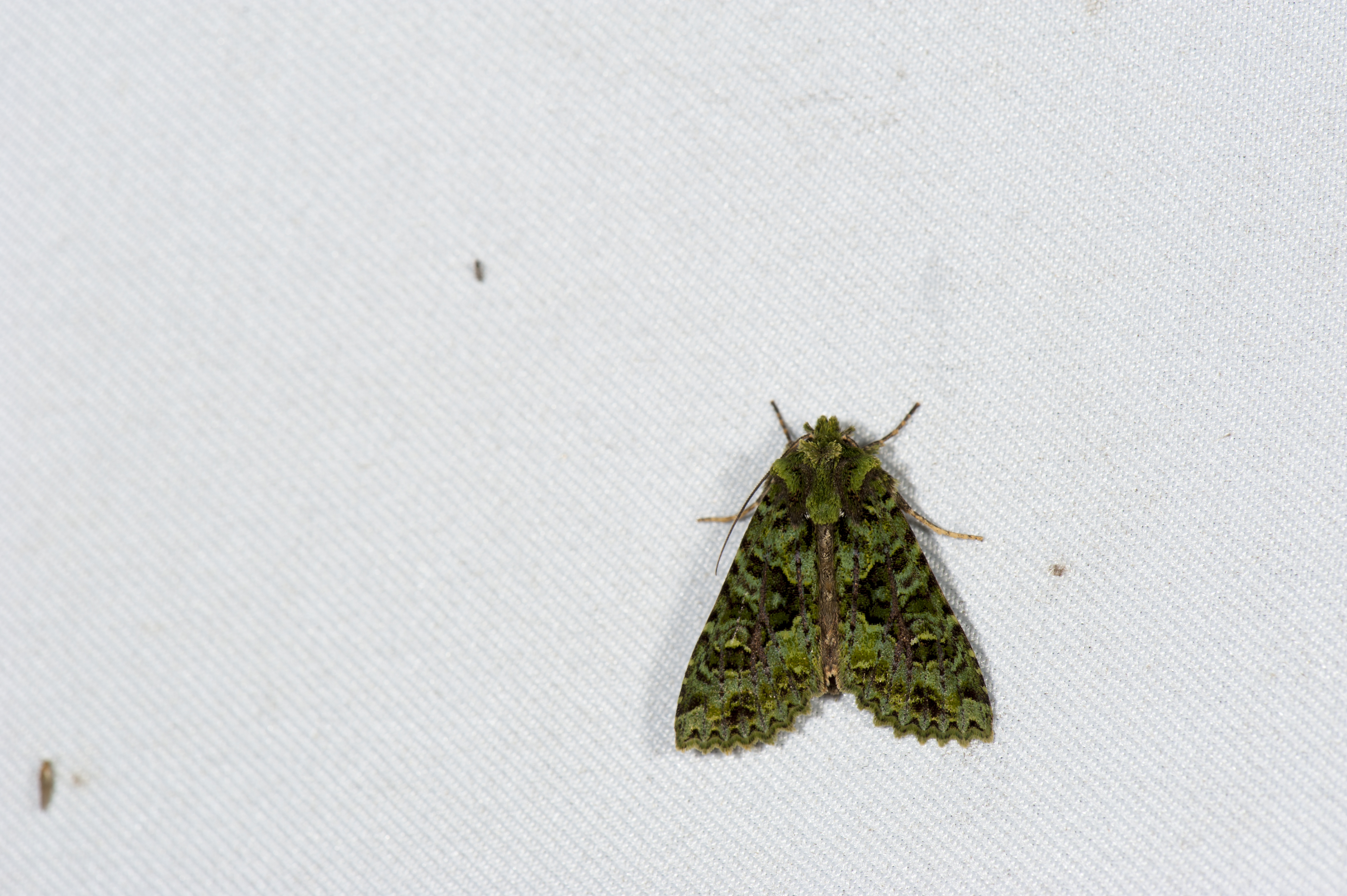

Scientific classification
- Kingdom: Animalia
- Phylum: Arthropoda
- Clade: Pancrustacea
- Class: Insecta
- Order: Lepidoptera
- Superfamily: Noctuoidea
- Family: Noctuidae
- Genus: Potnyctycia
- Species: P. nemesi

Binomial name
- Potnyctycia nemesi Ronkay & Ronkay, 2001

= Potnyctycia nemesi =

Species of Noctuid moth

Potnyctycia nemesi is a species of moth in the family Noctuidae. It is endemic to Taiwan and occurs in mixed forest.

== Description ==
They can have a wingspan of 36–39 mm (1.4–1.5 in) with the length of the forewing being 17–19 mm (0.67–0.75 in). This species is difficult to distinguish from Potnyctycia taiwana. It can be distinguished with the greenish pattern of the forewing being a paler grass-greenish color that lacks a dark olive-green irroration. The last sternite of the female is larger, wider and broader with a V-shape caudal incision.
