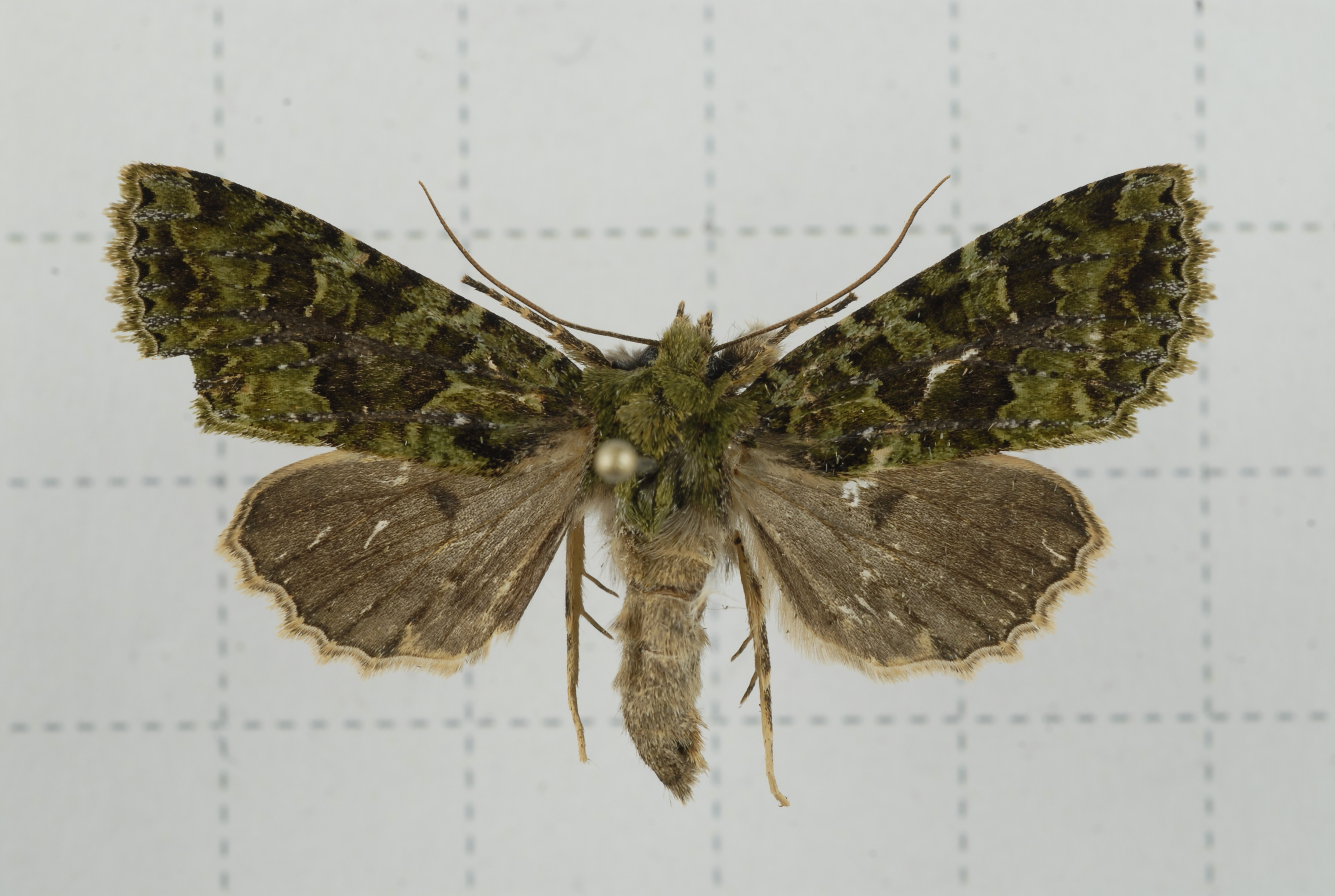

Scientific classification
- Kingdom: Animalia
- Phylum: Arthropoda
- Class: Insecta
- Order: Lepidoptera
- Superfamily: Noctuoidea
- Family: Noctuidae
- Genus: Potnyctycia
- Species: P. taiwana

Binomial name
- Potnyctycia taiwana (Chang, 1991)

Synonyms
- Antivaleria taiwana Chang, 1991; Atrachea taiwana (Chang, 1991)

= Potnyctycia taiwana =

Species of Noctuid moth

Potnyctycia taiwana is a species of moth that belongs to the family Noctuidae. It is native to Taiwan.

== Description ==
They are similar in appearance to Potnyctycia nemesi, being hardly distinguishable externally. This species is however is easily distinguished by its male genitalia, female genitalia are similar to P. nemesi.

== Taxonomic history ==
This species originally placed into the genus Antivaleria before being reassigned to Potnyctycia. Its placement into its current genus was due to the discovery on a series of large A. taiwana which revealed that there were two species which are partly sympatric.
