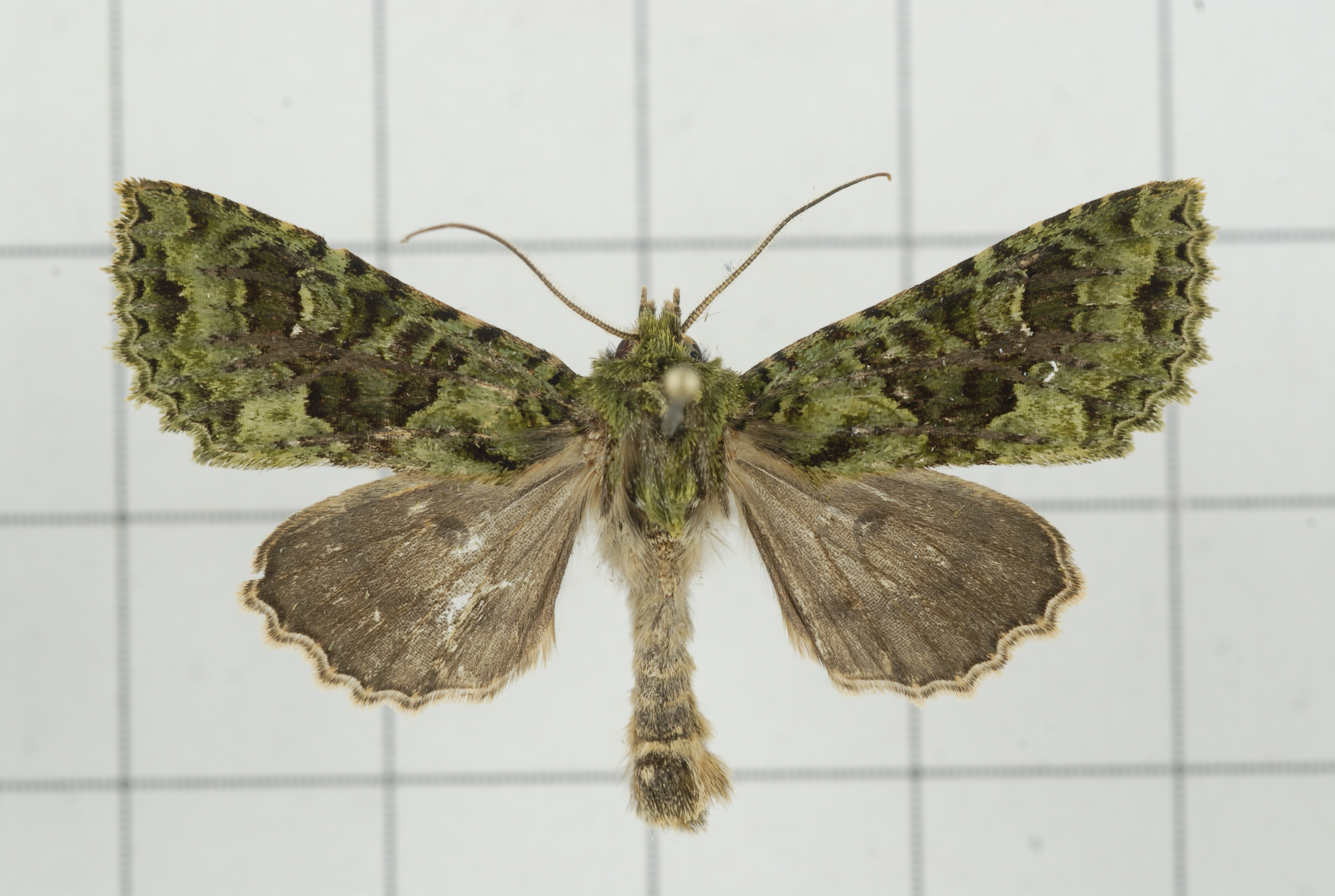
- Potnyctycia nemesi
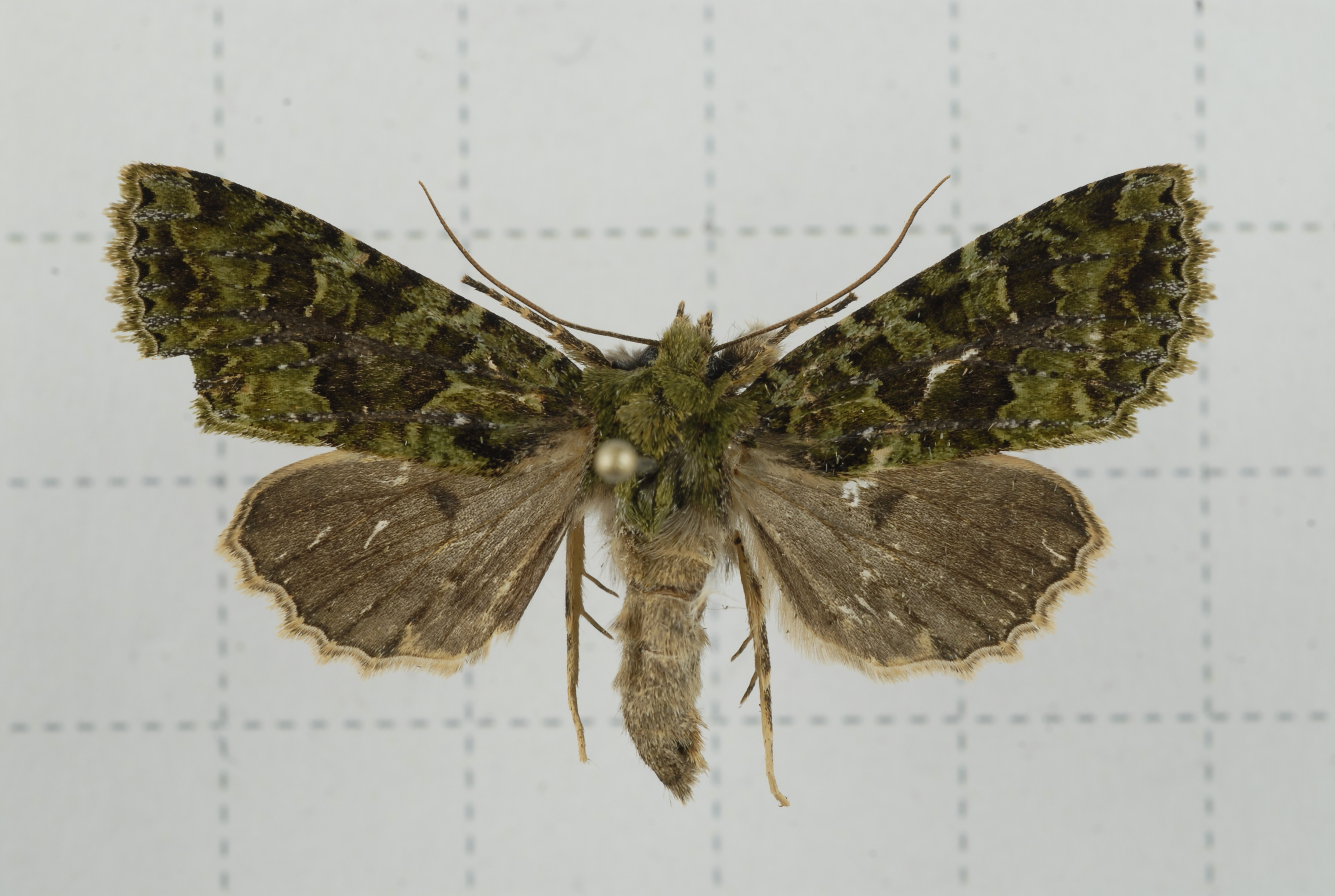
- Potnyctycia taiwana

Scientific classification
- Kingdom: Animalia
- Phylum: Arthropoda
- Clade: Pancrustacea
- Class: Insecta
- Order: Lepidoptera
- Superfamily: Noctuoidea
- Family: Noctuidae
- Subfamily: Xyleninae
- Genus: Potnyctycia; Hreblay & Ronkay, 1998

= Potnyctycia =

Genus of moths

Potnyctycia is a genus of moths that belongs to the family Noctuidae (owlet moths).

== Species ==
This genus currently contains seven recognized species:

- Potnyctycia argillacea (Draudt, 1950)
- Potnyctycia cristifera Hreblay & Ronkay, 1997
- Potnyctycia frontieri Hreblay, Peregovits & Ronkay, 1999
- Potnyctycia laerkeae Benedek, Babics & Saldaitis, 2013
- Potnyctycia nemesi Ronkay & Ronkay, 2001
- Potnyctycia recta Hreblay, Katona & Tóth, 2023
- Potnyctycia taiwana (Chang, 1991)

"Lepidoptera and some other life forms" includes further species that are assigned to other genera in the "Global Lepidoptera Index".
