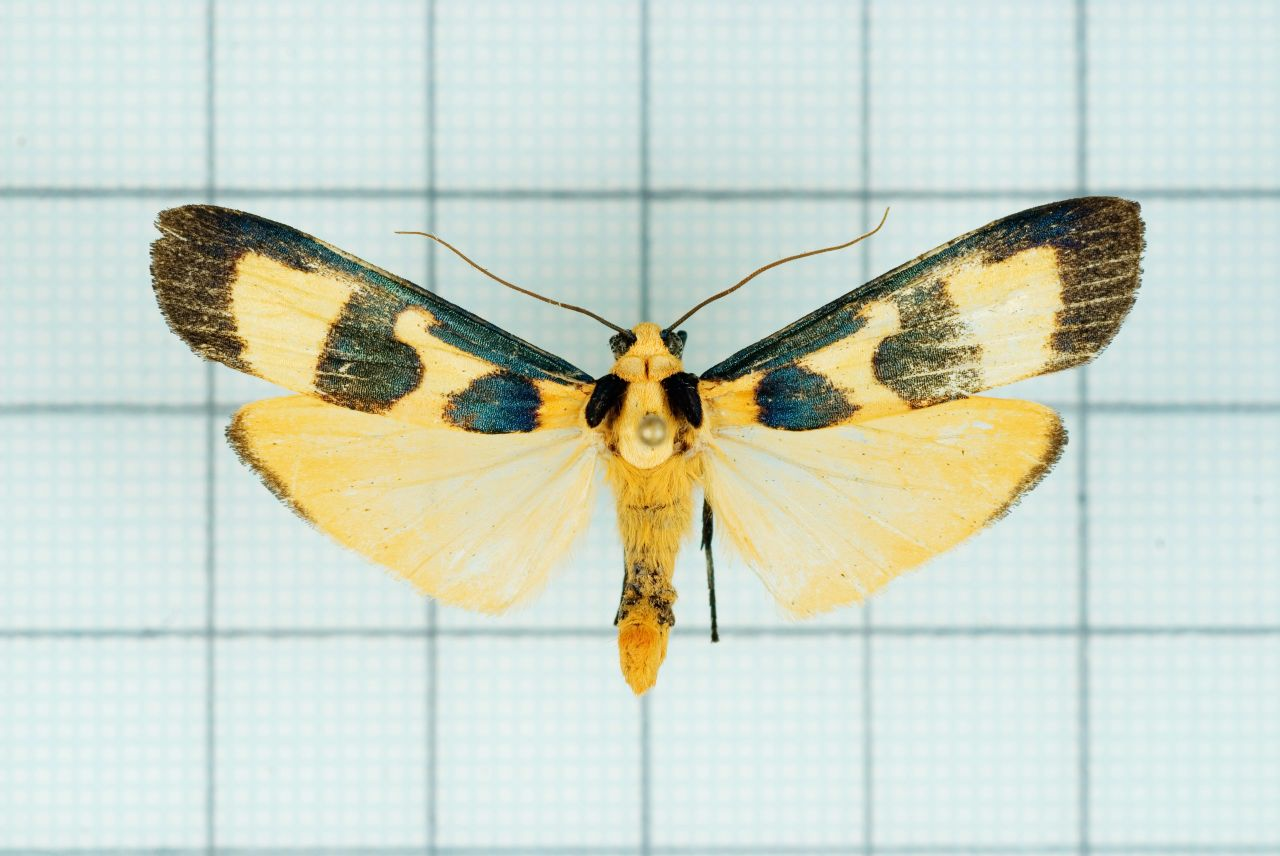
- Chrysaeglia magnifica

Scientific classification
- Domain: Eukaryota
- Kingdom: Animalia
- Phylum: Arthropoda
- Class: Insecta
- Order: Lepidoptera
- Superfamily: Noctuoidea
- Family: Erebidae
- Subfamily: Arctiinae
- Tribe: Lithosiini
- Genus: Chrysaeglia; Butler, 1877

= Chrysaeglia =

Genus of moths

Chrysaeglia is a genus of moths in the subfamily Arctiinae. The genus was erected by Arthur Gardiner Butler in 1877.

== Species ==
- Chrysaeglia magnifica (Walker, 1862)
- Chrysaeglia perpendicularis Cerny, 1995
- Chrysaeglia xantha Kishida, 1996
