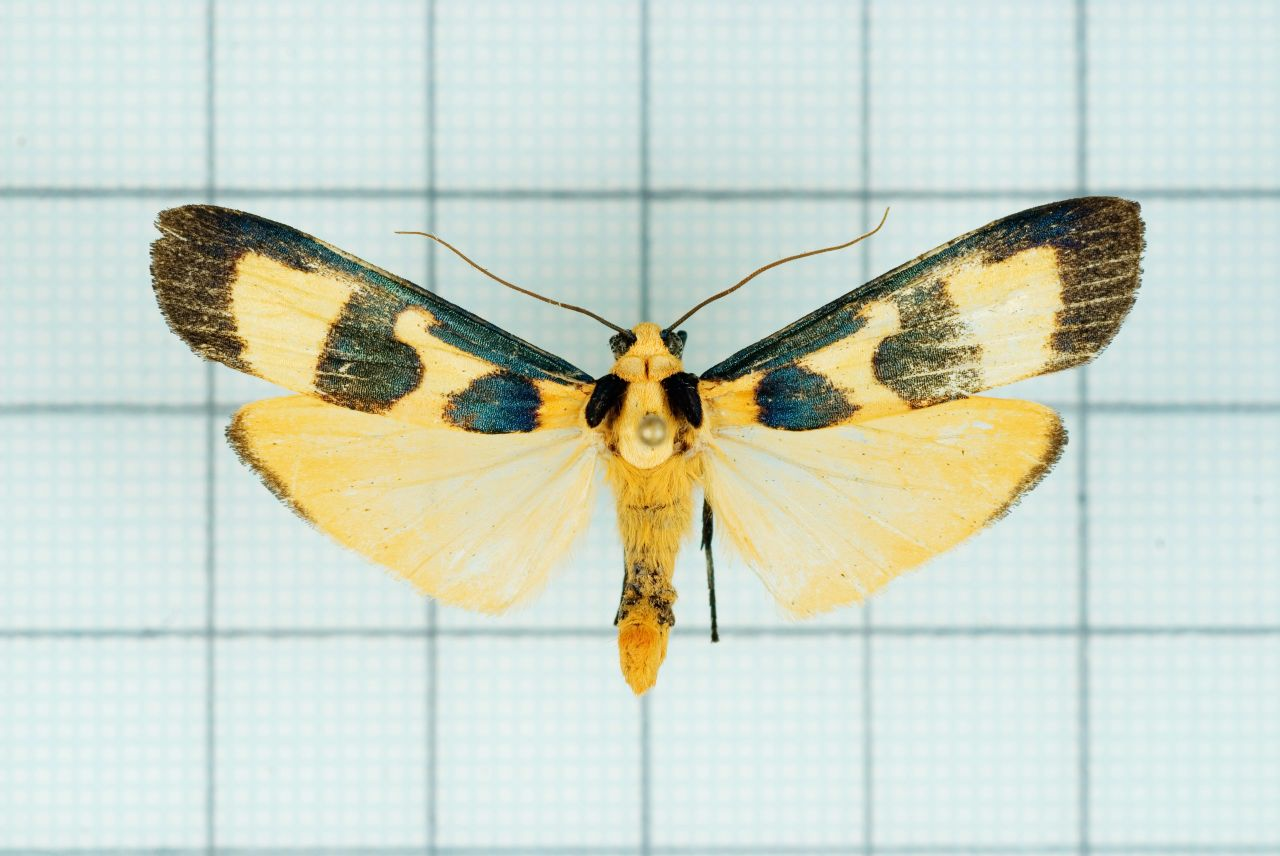

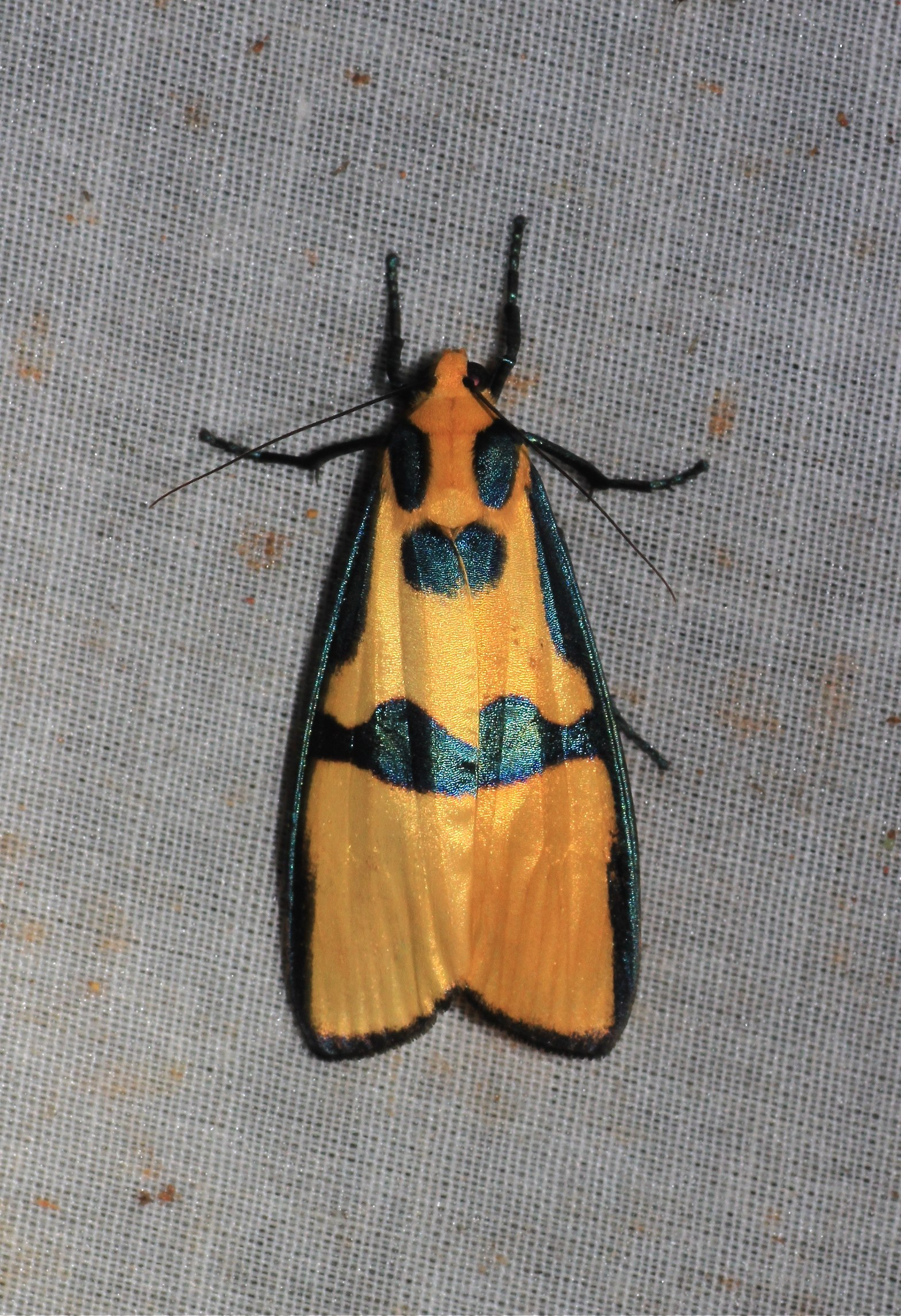

Scientific classification
- Kingdom: Animalia
- Phylum: Arthropoda
- Class: Insecta
- Order: Lepidoptera
- Superfamily: Noctuoidea
- Family: Erebidae
- Subfamily: Arctiinae
- Genus: Chrysaeglia
- Species: C. magnifica

Binomial name
- Chrysaeglia magnifica (Walker, 1862)

Synonyms
- Lithosia magnifica Walker, 1862; Chrysaeglia ferrifasciata Moore, 1878; Chrysaeglia magnifica ab. taiwana Wileman, 1910; Chrysaeglia magnifica gigas Kishida, 1996; Chrysaeglia taiwana

= Chrysaeglia magnifica =

Species of moth

Chrysaeglia magnifica is a species of moth in the family Erebidae, subfamily Arctiinae (formerly treated as the subfamily Arctiinae). It was first described by Francis Walker in 1862 and is found in India, Nepal, Sikkim, Borneo, Sulawesi and Taiwan.

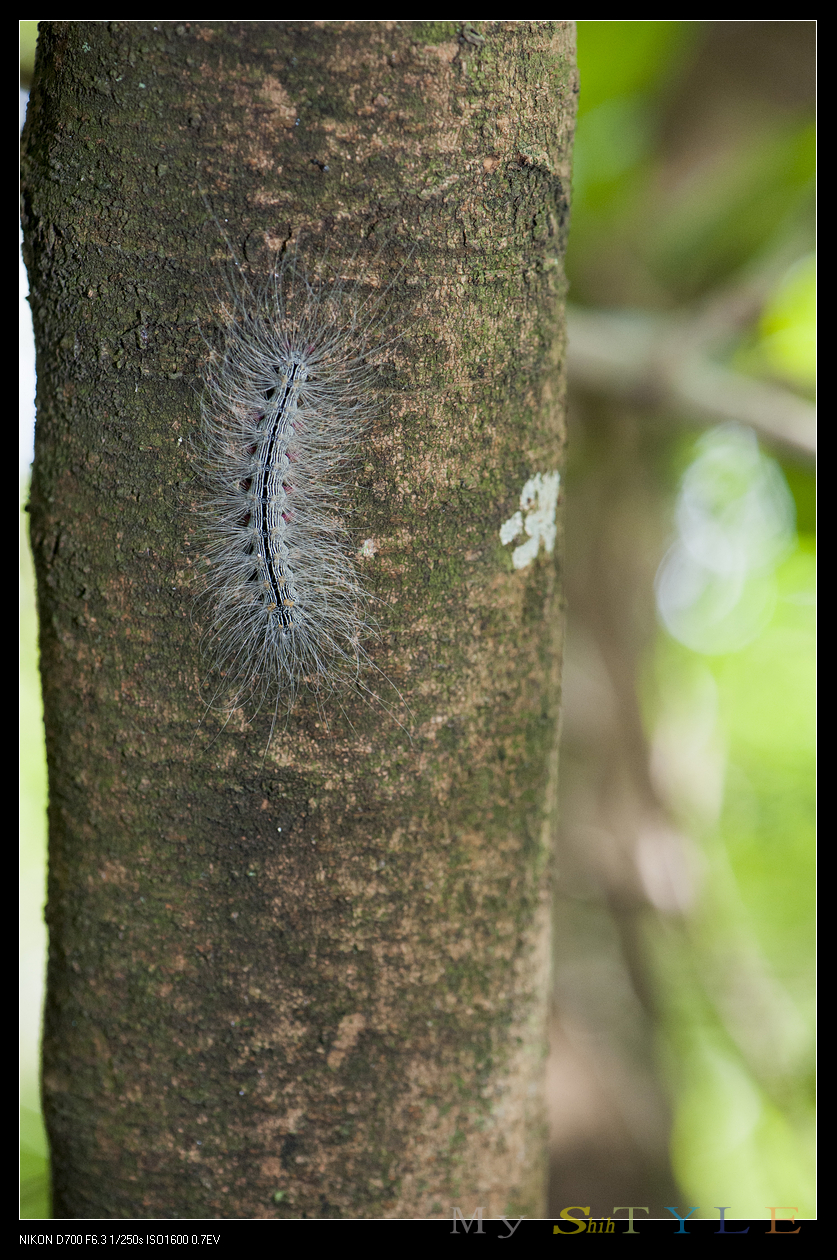
Larva

== Subspecies ==
- Chrysaeglia magnifica magnifica
- Chrysaeglia magnifica gigas Kishida, 1996 (Sulawesi)
- Chrysaeglia magnifica taiwana Wileman, 1910 (Taiwan)
