= Chrysaeglia perpendicularis =

Scientific classification
- Domain: Eukaryota
- Kingdom: Animalia
- Phylum: Arthropoda
- Class: Insecta
- Order: Lepidoptera
- Superfamily: Noctuoidea
- Family: Erebidae
- Subfamily: Arctiinae
- Genus: Chrysaeglia
- Species: C. perpendicularis

Binomial name
- Chrysaeglia perpendicularis Černý, 1995

Synonyms
- Chrysaeglia negrosensis Kishida, 1996

Species of moth

Chrysaeglia perpendicularis is a moth of the subfamily Arctiinae. It was described by Karel Černý in 1995. It is found in the Philippines and on Sulawesi.
