= Chrysaeglia xantha =

Scientific classification
- Domain: Eukaryota
- Kingdom: Animalia
- Phylum: Arthropoda
- Class: Insecta
- Order: Lepidoptera
- Superfamily: Noctuoidea
- Family: Erebidae
- Subfamily: Arctiinae
- Genus: Chrysaeglia
- Species: C. xantha

Binomial name
- Chrysaeglia xantha Kishida, 1996

Species of moth

Chrysaeglia xantha is a moth of the subfamily Arctiinae. It was described by Yasunori Kishida in 1996. It is found on Sulawesi.
