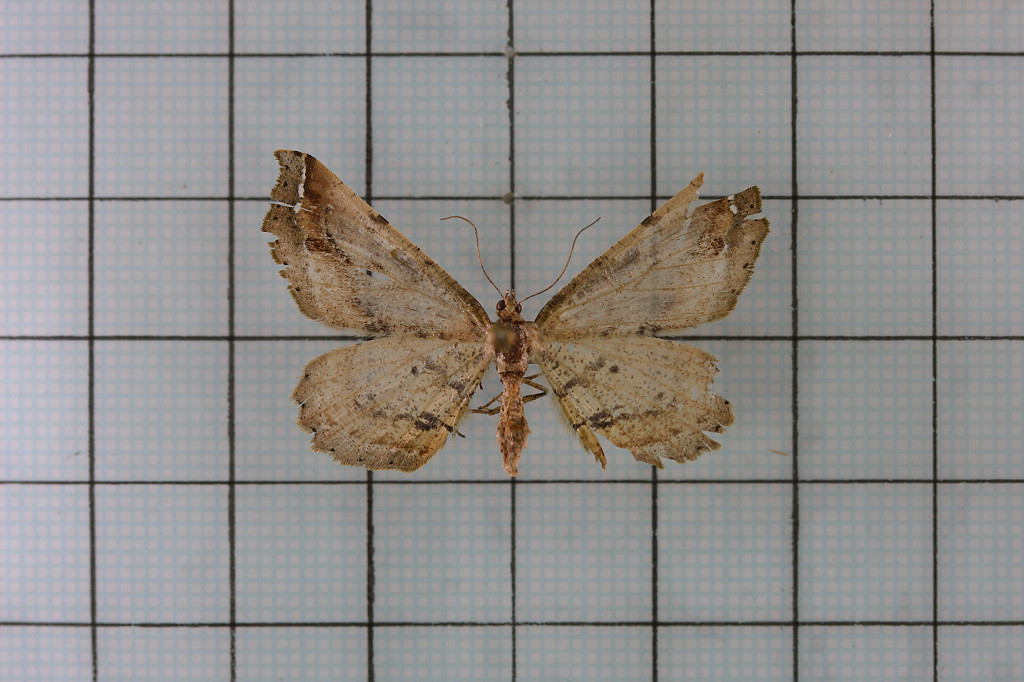
- Heterocallia truncaria

Scientific classification
- Kingdom: Animalia
- Phylum: Arthropoda
- Class: Insecta
- Order: Lepidoptera
- Family: Geometridae
- Tribe: Macariini
- Genus: Heterocallia; Leech, 1897

= Heterocallia =

Genus of moths

Heterocallia is a genus of moths in the family Geometridae erected by John Henry Leech in 1897. It is sometimes listed as a synonym of Oxymacaria.

== Selected species ==
- Heterocallia deformis Inoue, 1986
- Heterocallia truncaria Leech, 1897
