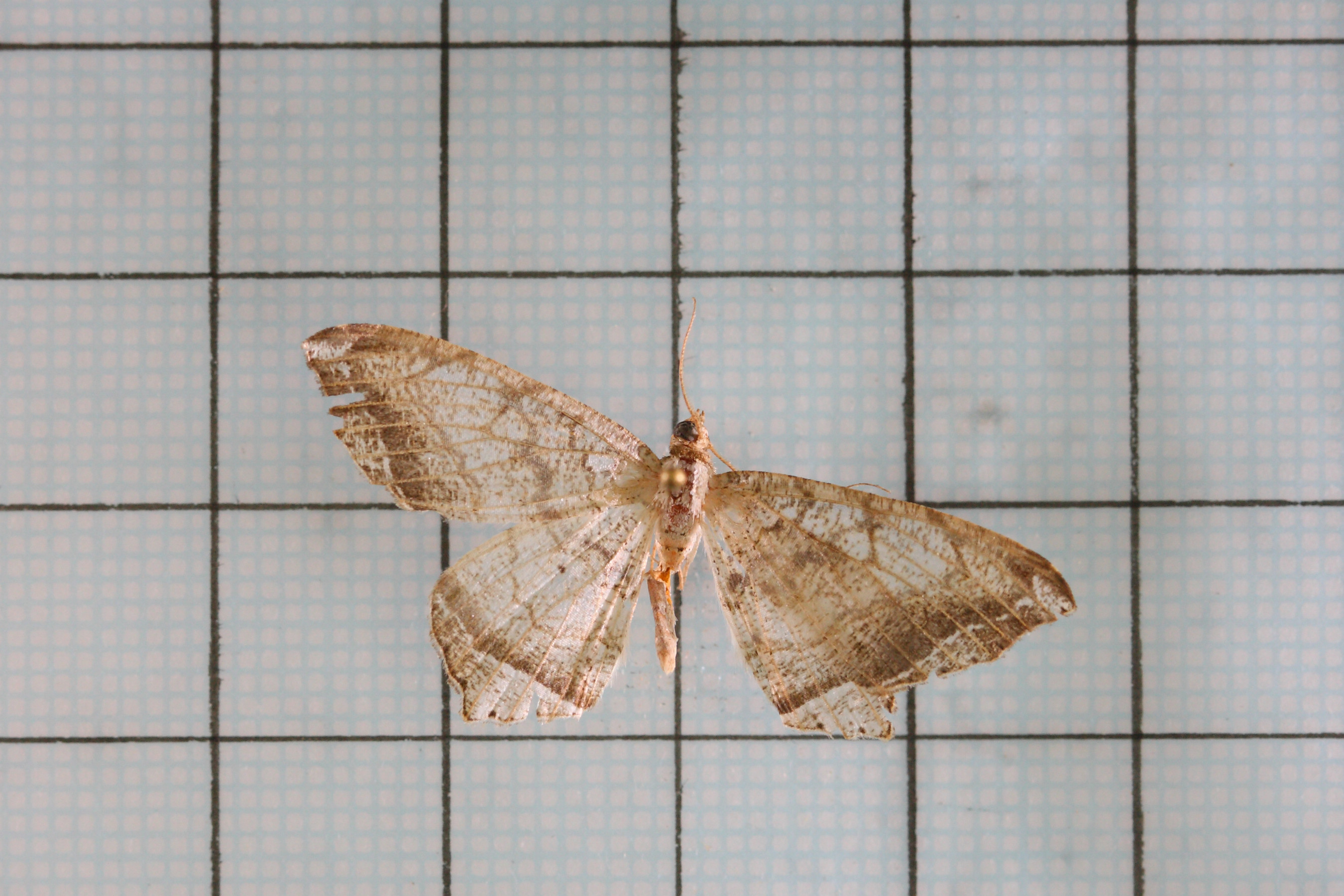

Scientific classification
- Domain: Eukaryota
- Kingdom: Animalia
- Phylum: Arthropoda
- Class: Insecta
- Order: Lepidoptera
- Family: Geometridae
- Genus: Oxymacaria
- Species: O. temeraria

Binomial name
- Oxymacaria temeraria (Swinhoe, 1891)

Synonyms
- Macaria temeraria Swinhoe, 1891; Semiothisa temeraria ab. fumosa Warren, 1896; Semiothisa temeraria cruda Prout, 1935

= Oxymacaria temeraria =

Species of moth

Oxymacaria temeraria is a moth of the family Geometridae first described by Swinhoe in 1891. It is found in the Indian region, western China, Taiwan, Japan, Borneo and Java.

The wingspan is 29–34 mm.
