= Oxymacaria ceylonica =

Scientific classification
- Kingdom: Animalia
- Phylum: Arthropoda
- Class: Insecta
- Order: Lepidoptera
- Family: Geometridae
- Genus: Oxymacaria
- Species: O. ceylonica

Binomial name
- Oxymacaria ceylonica Hampson, 1902

Species of moth

Oxymacaria ceylonica is a moth of the family Geometridae first described by George Hampson in 1902. It is found in Sri Lanka.
