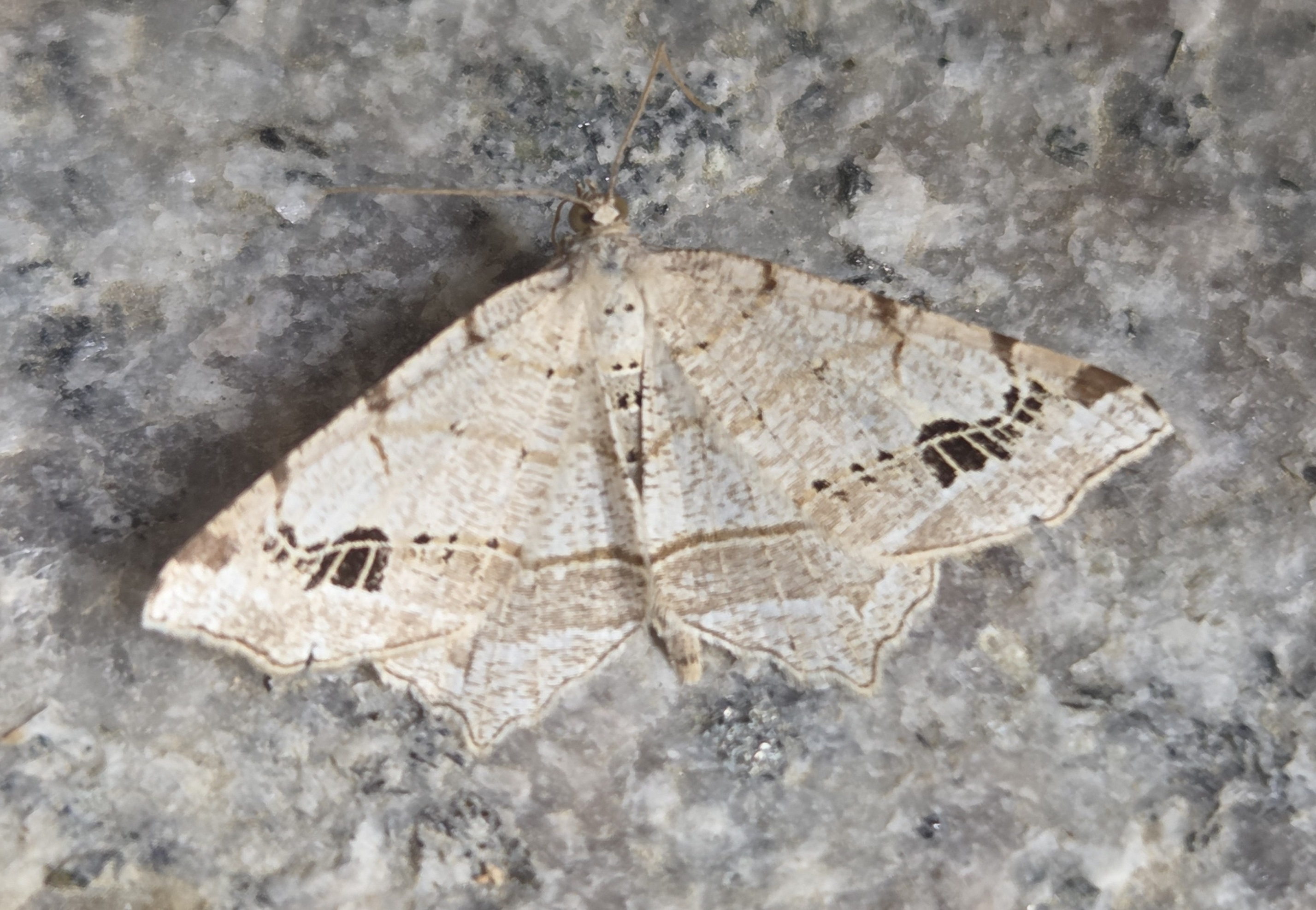
- Oxymacaria normata, South Korea

Scientific classification
- Kingdom: Animalia
- Phylum: Arthropoda
- Clade: Pancrustacea
- Class: Insecta
- Order: Lepidoptera
- Family: Geometridae
- Genus: Oxymacaria; Warren, 1894

= Oxymacaria =

Genus of moths

Oxymacaria is a genus of moths in the family Geometridae described by Warren in 1894.

== Species ==
- Oxymacaria ceylonica Hampson, 1902
- Oxymacaria normata Alpheraky, 1892
- Oxymacaria odontias (Lower, 1893) Australia
- Oxymacaria oliva (Swinhoe, 1894) northern Himalayas, Java, Borneo
- Oxymacaria penumbrata (Warren) Himalayas
- Oxymacaria palliata (Hampson, 1891) India
- Oxymacaria temeraria (Swinhoe, 1891) India, western China, Taiwan, Japan, Borneo
- Oxymacaria truncaria Leech
