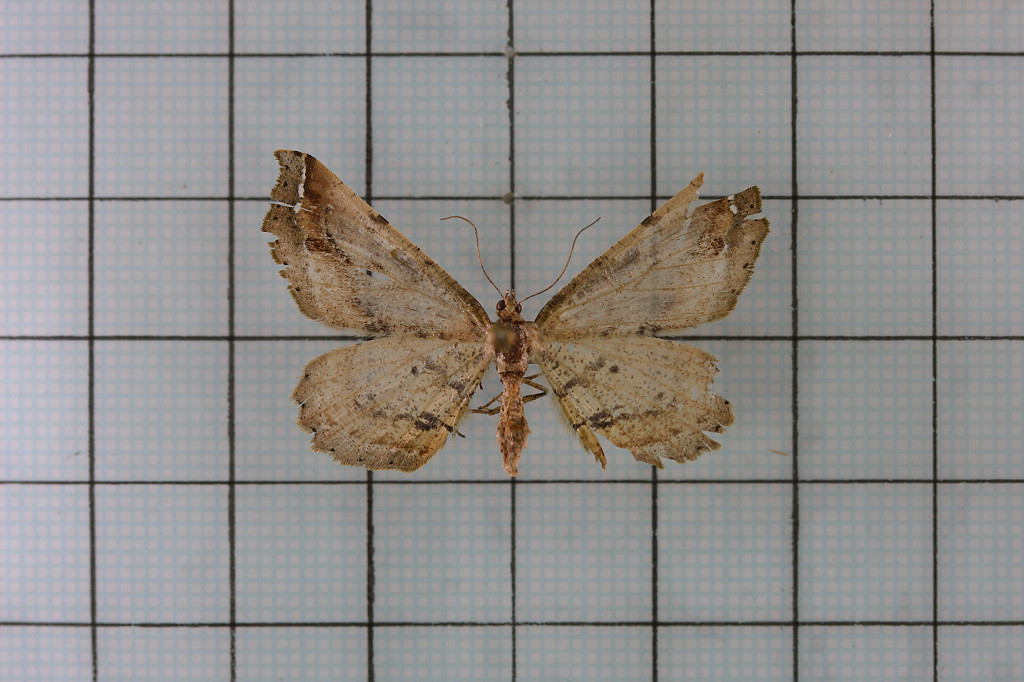

Scientific classification
- Kingdom: Animalia
- Phylum: Arthropoda
- Class: Insecta
- Order: Lepidoptera
- Family: Geometridae
- Genus: Heterocallia
- Species: H. truncaria

Binomial name
- Heterocallia truncaria Leech, 1897

Synonyms
- Heterocallia likiangensis Wehrli, 1940; Oxymacaria truncaria

= Heterocallia truncaria =

Species of moth

Heterocallia truncaria is a moth of the family Geometridae first described by John Henry Leech in 1897. It is found in China and Taiwan.
