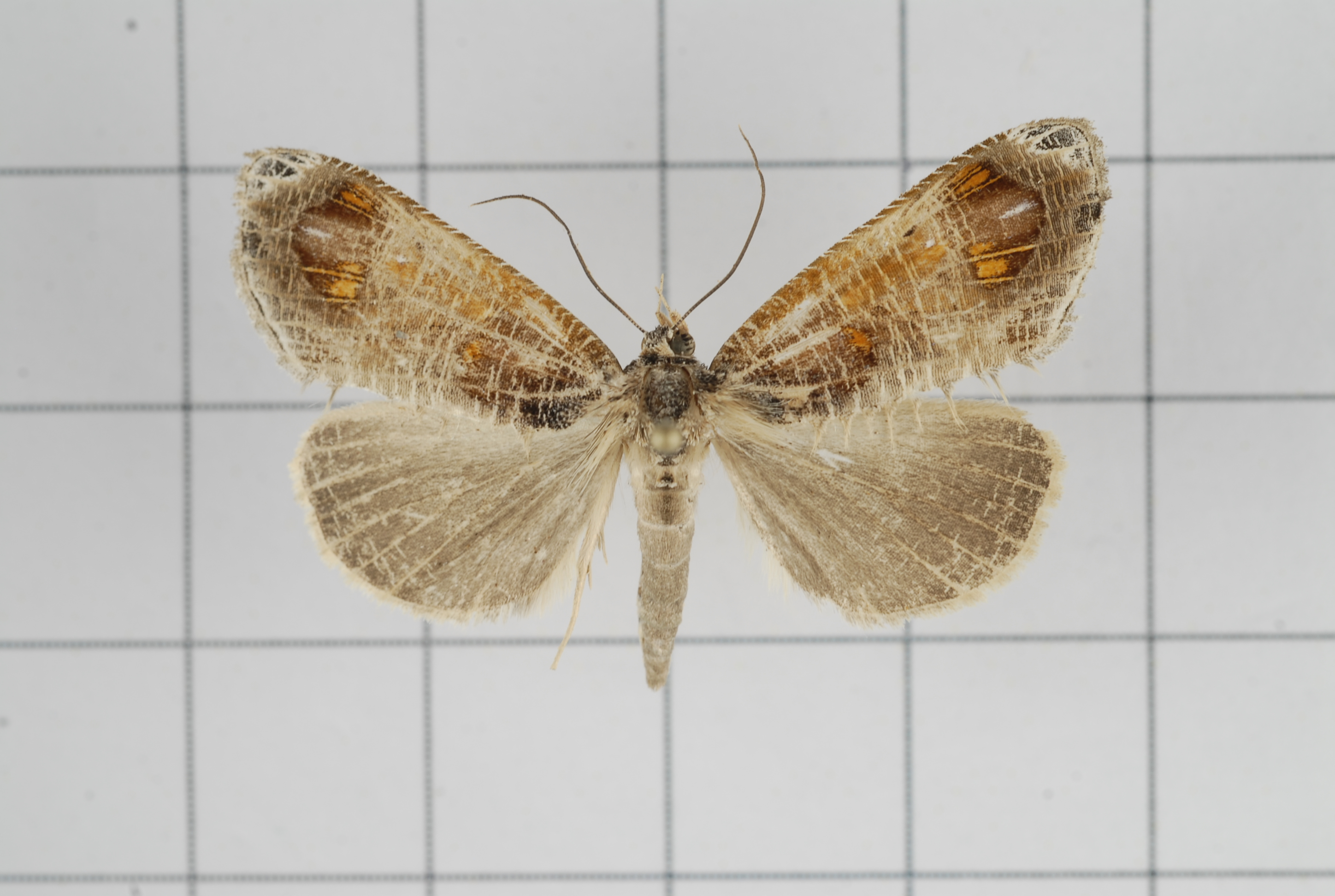

Scientific classification
- Kingdom: Animalia
- Phylum: Arthropoda
- Clade: Pancrustacea
- Class: Insecta
- Order: Lepidoptera
- Superfamily: Noctuoidea
- Family: Erebidae
- Genus: Pilipectus
- Species: P. prunifera

Binomial name
- Pilipectus prunifera (Hampson, 1894)

= Pilipectus prunifera =

Species of moth

Pilipectus prunifera is a moth of the family Noctuidae first described by George Hampson in 1894. It is found in Sri Lanka, China, Taiwan and Japan.
