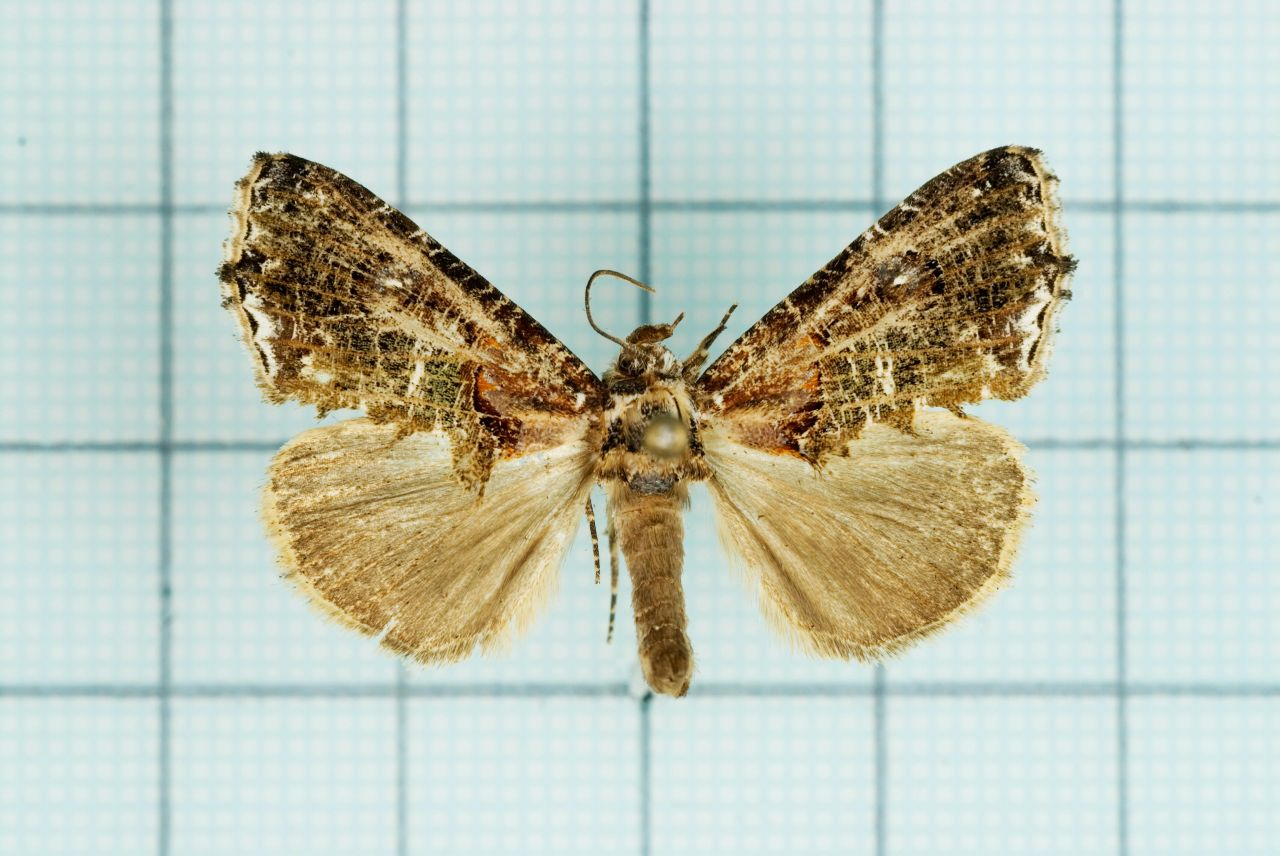

Scientific classification
- Domain: Eukaryota
- Kingdom: Animalia
- Phylum: Arthropoda
- Class: Insecta
- Order: Lepidoptera
- Superfamily: Noctuoidea
- Family: Erebidae
- Genus: Pilipectus
- Species: P. taiwanus

Binomial name
- Pilipectus taiwanus Wileman, 1915

= Pilipectus taiwanus =

Species of moth

Pilipectus taiwanus is a species of moth of the family Noctuidae first described by Wileman in 1915. It is found in Taiwan.
