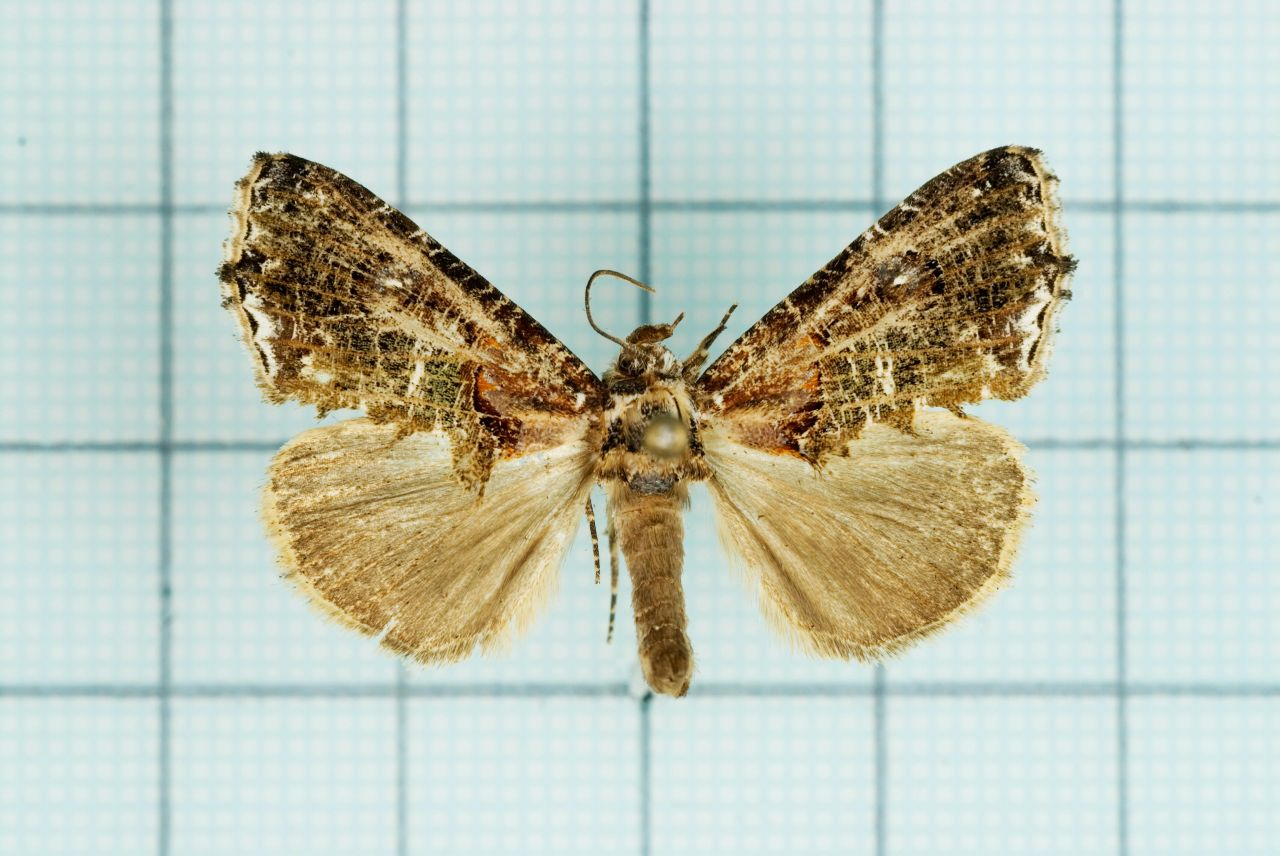
- Pilipectus taiwanus

Scientific classification
- Domain: Eukaryota
- Kingdom: Animalia
- Phylum: Arthropoda
- Class: Insecta
- Order: Lepidoptera
- Superfamily: Noctuoidea
- Family: Erebidae
- Subfamily: Calpinae
- Genus: Pilipectus; Bethune-Baker, 1910

= Pilipectus =

Genus of moths

Pilipectus is a genus of moths in the family Erebidae. The genus was erected by George Thomas Bethune-Baker in 1910.

== Species ==
- Pilipectus chinensis Draeseke, 1931
- Pilipectus cyclopis Hampson, 1912
- Pilipectus ocellatus Bethune-Baker, 1910
- Pilipectus prunifera (Hampson, 1894)
- Pilipectus taiwanus Wileman, 1915
