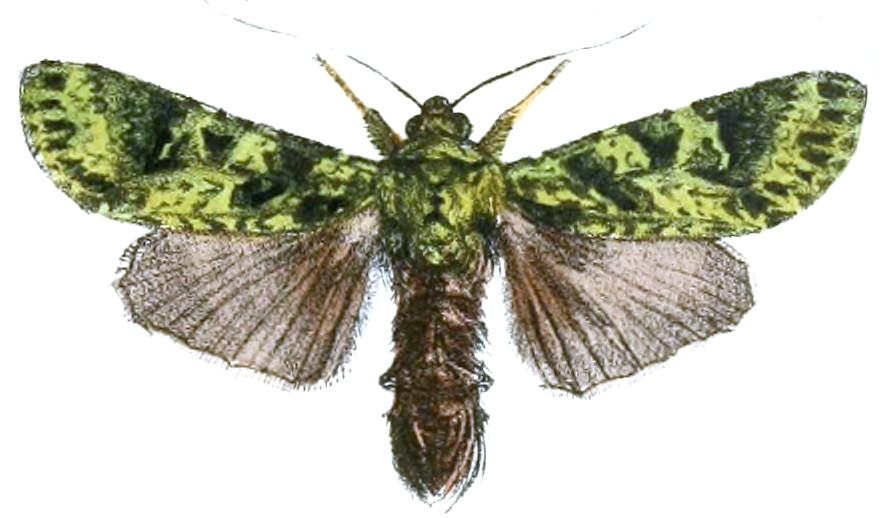

Scientific classification
- Domain: Eukaryota
- Kingdom: Animalia
- Phylum: Arthropoda
- Class: Insecta
- Order: Lepidoptera
- Superfamily: Noctuoidea
- Family: Noctuidae
- Genus: Checupa
- Species: C. fortissima

Binomial name
- Checupa fortissima Moore, 1867

= Checupa fortissima =

Species of moth

Checupa fortissima is a species of moth of the family Noctuidae. It is found in the north-eastern Himalaya.
