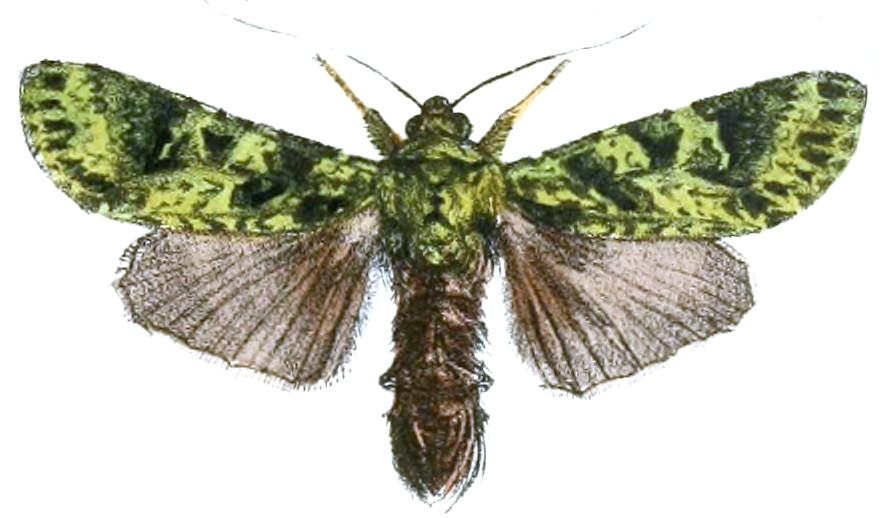
- Checupa fortissima

Scientific classification
- Domain: Eukaryota
- Kingdom: Animalia
- Phylum: Arthropoda
- Class: Insecta
- Order: Lepidoptera
- Superfamily: Noctuoidea
- Family: Noctuidae
- Genus: Checupa; Moore, 1867

= Checupa =

Genus of moths

Checupa is a genus of moths of the family Noctuidae.

== Species ==
- Checupa curvivena Prout, 1924
- Checupa equifortis Prout, 1924
- Checupa fortissima Moore, 1867
- Checupa stegeri Hreblay & Thöny, 1995
