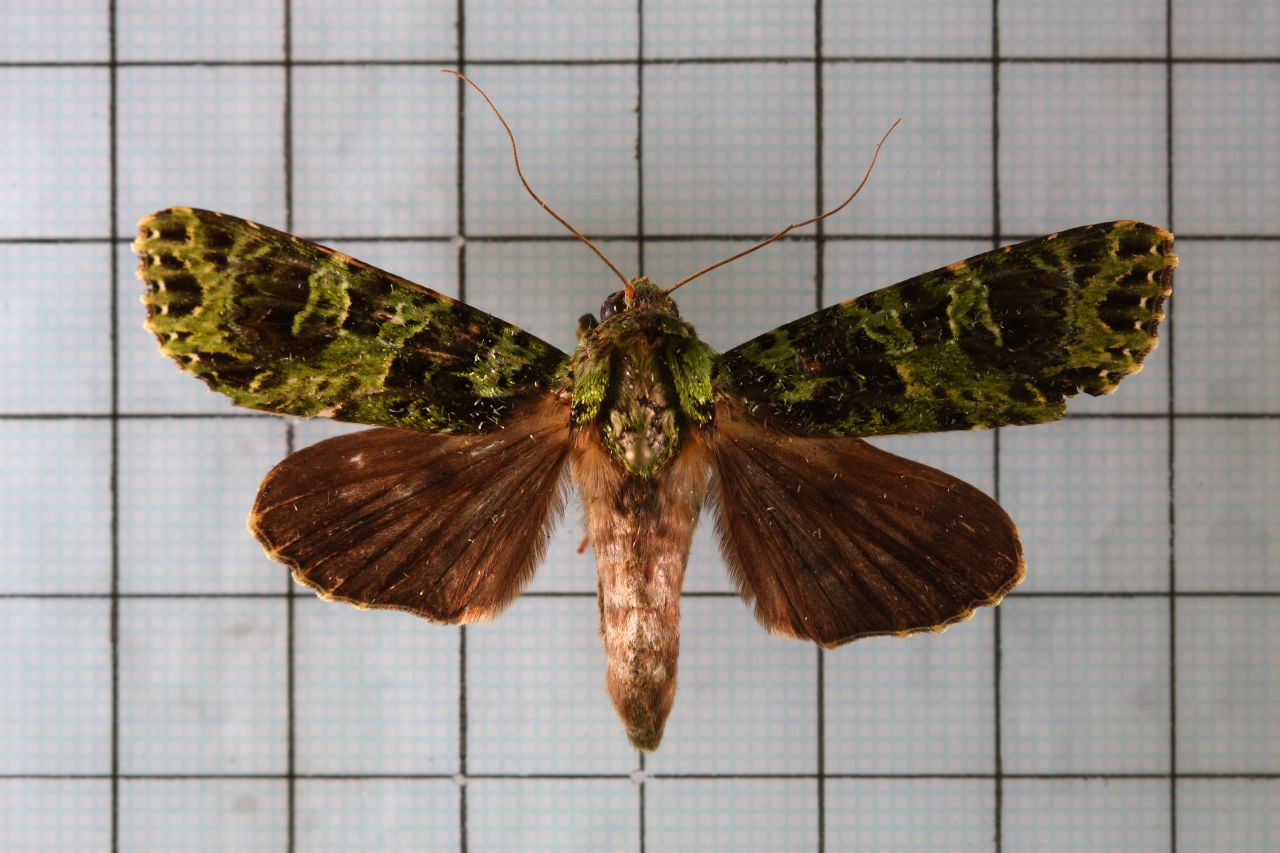

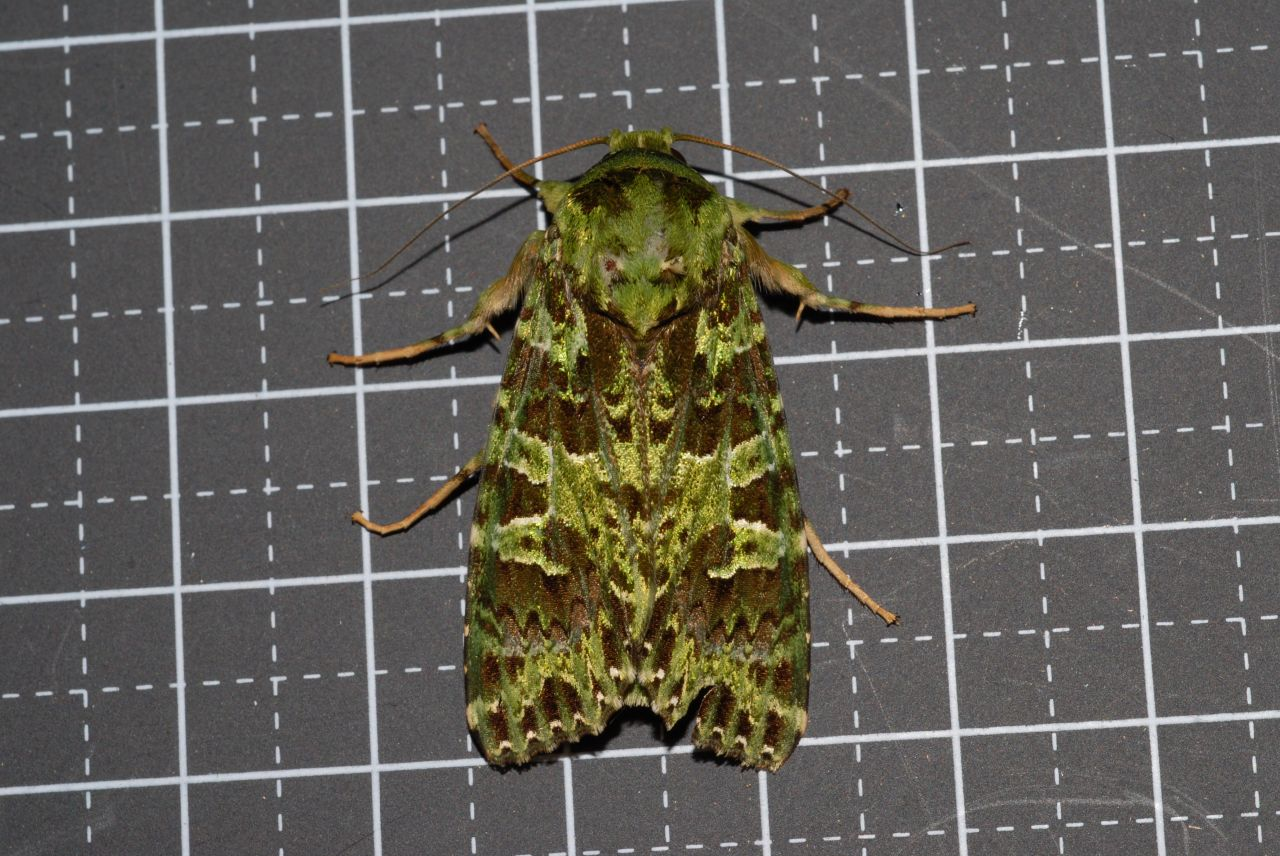

Scientific classification
- Domain: Eukaryota
- Kingdom: Animalia
- Phylum: Arthropoda
- Class: Insecta
- Order: Lepidoptera
- Superfamily: Noctuoidea
- Family: Noctuidae
- Genus: Checupa
- Species: C. stegeri

Binomial name
- Checupa stegeri Hreblay & Thöny, 1995

= Checupa stegeri =

Species of moth

Checupa stegeri is a moth of the family Noctuidae. It is found in Taiwan.
