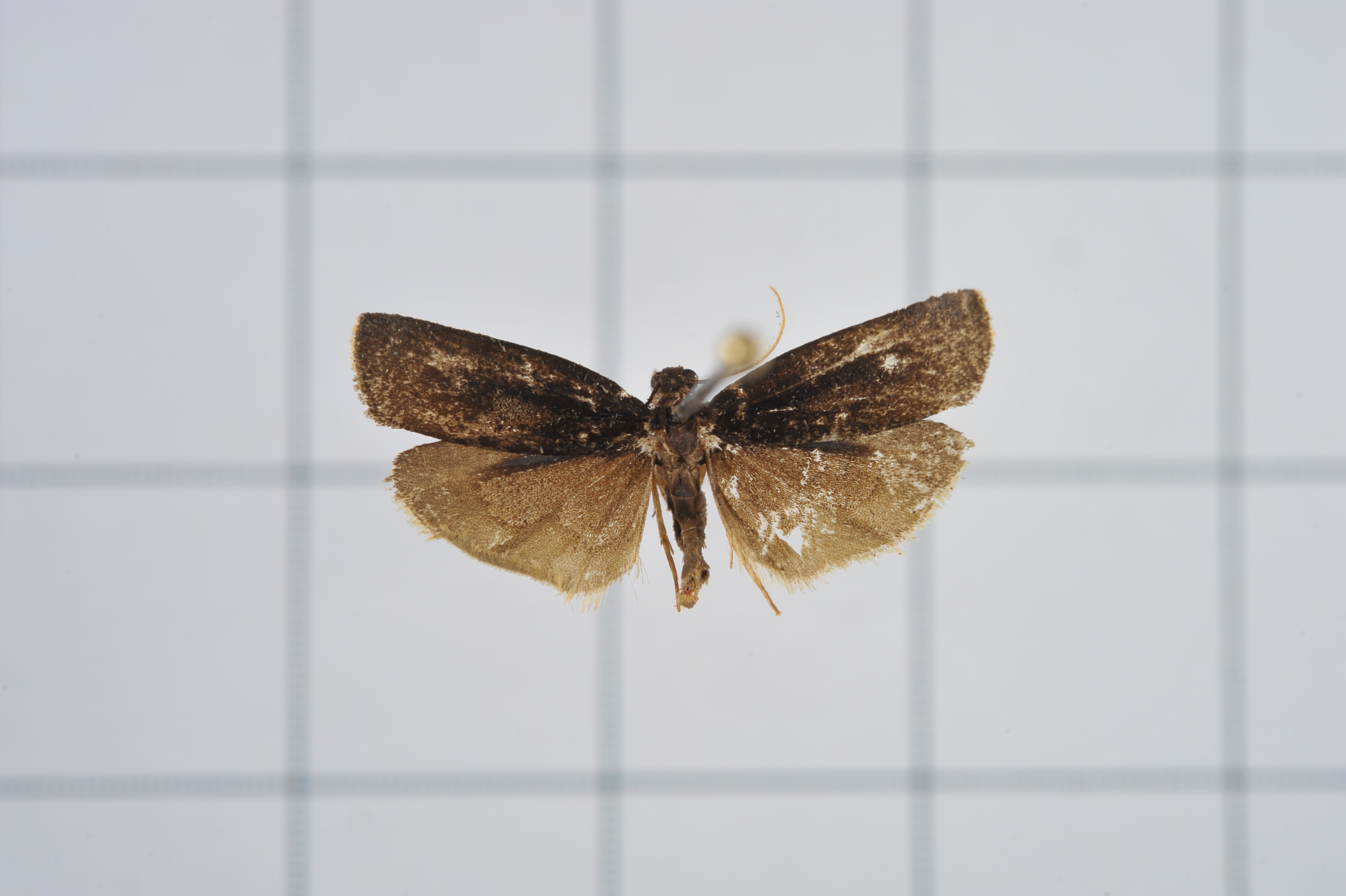

Scientific classification
- Kingdom: Animalia
- Phylum: Arthropoda
- Class: Insecta
- Order: Lepidoptera
- Superfamily: Noctuoidea
- Family: Erebidae
- Subfamily: Arctiinae
- Genus: Blavia
- Species: B. scoteola

Binomial name
- Blavia scoteola (Hampson, 1900)

Synonyms
- Neoblavia scoteola Hampson, 1900

= Blavia scoteola =

Species of moth

Blavia scoteola is a moth of the subfamily Arctiinae first described by George Hampson in 1900. It is found in the Indian state of Sikkim and Taiwan.
