= Blavia caliginosa =

Scientific classification
- Kingdom: Animalia
- Phylum: Arthropoda
- Class: Insecta
- Order: Lepidoptera
- Superfamily: Noctuoidea
- Family: Erebidae
- Subfamily: Arctiinae
- Genus: Blavia
- Species: B. caliginosa

Binomial name
- Blavia caliginosa Walker, 1862

Species of moth

Blavia caliginosa is a moth of the subfamily Arctiinae first described by Francis Walker in 1862. It is found on Borneo.
