= Blavia =

Scientific classification
- Kingdom: Animalia
- Phylum: Arthropoda
- Class: Insecta
- Order: Lepidoptera
- Superfamily: Noctuoidea
- Family: Erebidae
- Subfamily: Arctiinae
- Tribe: Lithosiini
- Genus: Blavia; Walker, 1862

Synonyms
- Neoblavia Hampson, 1900

Genus of moths

Blavia is a genus of moths in the subfamily Arctiinae. The genus was erected by Francis Walker in 1862.

== Species ==
- Blavia caliginosa Walker, 1862
- Blavia scoteola (Hampson, 1900)
