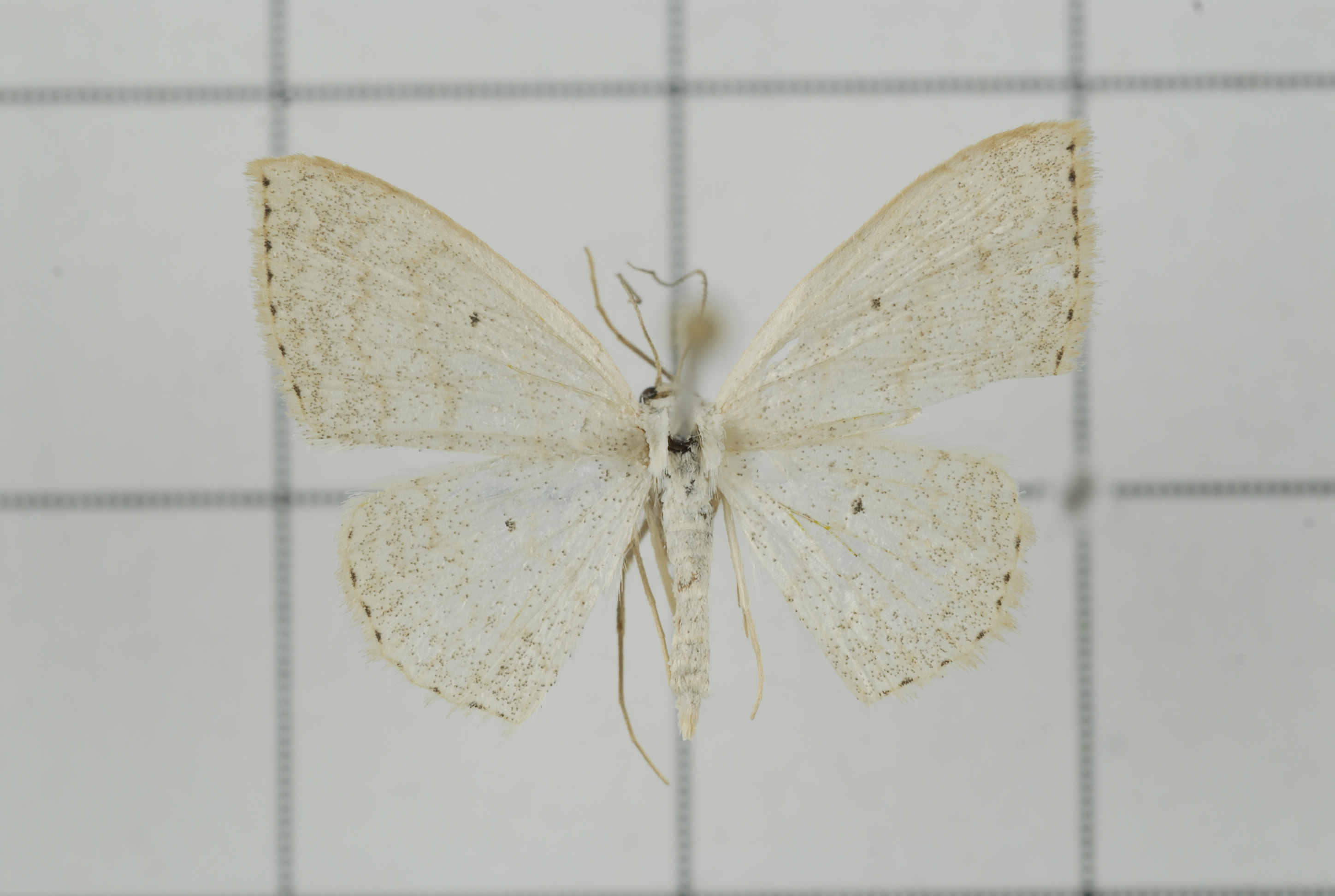

Scientific classification
- Domain: Eukaryota
- Kingdom: Animalia
- Phylum: Arthropoda
- Class: Insecta
- Order: Lepidoptera
- Family: Geometridae
- Genus: Scopula
- Species: S. attentata

Binomial name
- Scopula attentata (Walker, 1861)

Synonyms
- Acidalia attentata Walker 1861; Scopula nicobarica Prout 1938

= Scopula attentata =

Species of geometer moth in subfamily Sterrhinae

Scopula attentata is a moth of the family Geometridae. It was described by Francis Walker in 1861. It is found in India, Myanmar and Taiwan.
