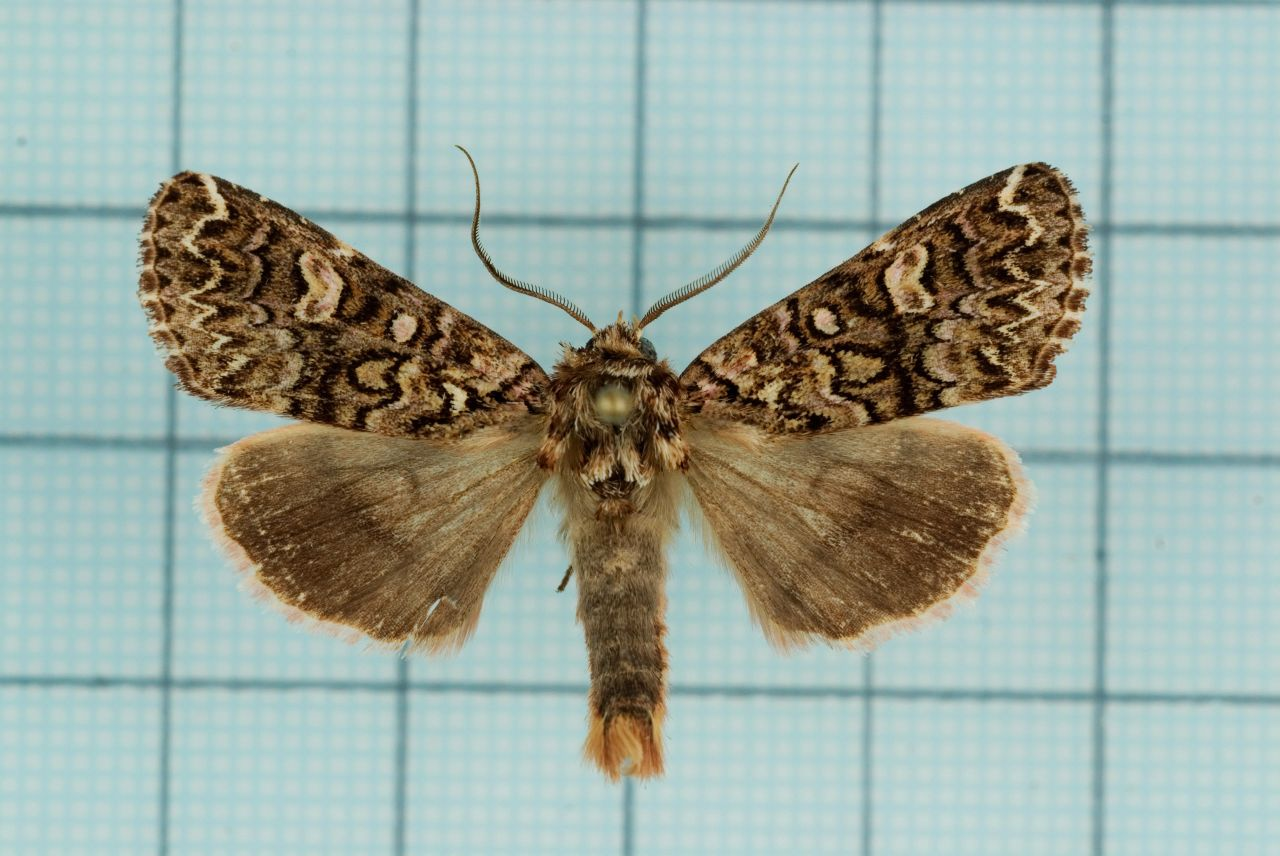

Scientific classification
- Domain: Eukaryota
- Kingdom: Animalia
- Phylum: Arthropoda
- Class: Insecta
- Order: Lepidoptera
- Superfamily: Noctuoidea
- Family: Noctuidae
- Subfamily: Xyleninae
- Genus: Taeneremina; Ronkay & Ronkay, 2001
- Species: T. scripta

Binomial name
- Taeneremina scripta Ronkay & Ronkay, 2001

= Taeneremina =

Taeneremina scripta

Genus of moths

Taeneremina is a genus of moths in the family Noctuidae. It contains only one species, Taeneremina scripta, which is found in Taiwan.
