= Scopula sybillaria =

Scientific classification
- Kingdom: Animalia
- Phylum: Arthropoda
- Class: Insecta
- Order: Lepidoptera
- Family: Geometridae
- Genus: Scopula
- Species: S. sybillaria

Binomial name
- Scopula sybillaria (C. Swinhoe, 1902)

Synonyms
- Craspedia sybillaria C. Swinhoe, 1902

Species of geometer moth in subfamily Sterrhinae

Scopula sybillaria is a moth of the family Geometridae first described by Charles Swinhoe in 1902. It is found in western China, Hong Kong and possibly Borneo.

Adults are greyish fawn in colour.
