= Scopula albilarvata =

Scientific classification
- Domain: Eukaryota
- Kingdom: Animalia
- Phylum: Arthropoda
- Class: Insecta
- Order: Lepidoptera
- Family: Geometridae
- Genus: Scopula
- Species: S. albilarvata

Binomial name
- Scopula albilarvata (Warren, 1899)

Synonyms
- Craspedia albilarvata Warren, 1899

Species of geometer moth in subfamily Sterrhinae

Scopula albilarvata is a moth of the family Geometridae. It was described Warren in 1899. It is found in Taiwan.
