= Scopula formosana =

Scientific classification
- Domain: Eukaryota
- Kingdom: Animalia
- Phylum: Arthropoda
- Class: Insecta
- Order: Lepidoptera
- Family: Geometridae
- Genus: Scopula
- Species: S. formosana

Binomial name
- Scopula formosana Prout, 1934

Synonyms
- Scopula moorei orientalis Prout, 1914 (preocc. Alphéraky, 1875)

Species of geometer moth in subfamily Sterrhinae

Scopula formosana is a moth of the family Geometridae. It is found in Taiwan.
