= Eudonia umbrosa =

Scientific classification
- Kingdom: Animalia
- Phylum: Arthropoda
- Class: Insecta
- Order: Lepidoptera
- Family: Crambidae
- Genus: Eudonia
- Species: E. umbrosa

Binomial name
- Eudonia umbrosa Sasaki, 1998

Species of moth

Eudonia umbrosa is a moth in the family Crambidae. It was described by Sasaki in 1998. It is found in Taiwan.
