= List of moths of India (Bombycidae) =

This is a list of moths of the family Bombycidae that are found in India. It also acts as an index to the species articles and forms part of the full List of moths of India.

== Subfamily Bombycinae ==
=== Genus Bombyx ===
- Bombyx mori Linnaeus, 1758 Note: an exotic species maintained in domestic situations only for the silk trade; native to China
- Bombyx lugubris (Drury, 1782) (= Theophila lugubris (Drury, 1782) sensu Hampson, 1892)
- Bombyx huttoni Westwood, 1847

=== Genus Triuncina ===
- Triuncina religiosae (Helfer, 1837) (= Theophila huttoni (Westwood, 1847) sensu Hampson, 1892)

=== Genus Ocinara ===
- Ocinara albicollis Walker, 1862

=== Genus Ectrocta ===
- Ectrocta diaphana Hampson, 1892 [1893]

=== Genus Trilocha ===
- Trilocha varians (Walker, 1855) (= Ocinara varians Walker, 1855 sensu Hampson, 1892)

=== Genus Penicillifera ===
- Penicillifera apicalis (Walker, 1862) (= Ocinara apicalis Walker, 1862 and Ocinara signifera Walker, 1862 sensu Hampson, 1892)

=== Genus Gunda ===
- Gunda thwaitesii Hampson, 1892
- Gunda sikkima Moore, 1879
- Gunda ochracea Walker, 1862

=== Genus Norasuma ===
- Norasuma javanica (Moore, 1872) (= Gunda javanica Moore, 1872 sensu Hampson, 1892)

== Subfamily Prismostictinae ==
=== Genus Mustilia ===
- Mustilia falcipennis Walker, 1865
- Mustilia sphingiformis Moore, 1879
- Mustilia hepatica Moore, 1879

=== Genus Andraca ===
- Andraca bipunctata Walker, 1865

== See also ==
- Bombycidae
- Moths
- Lepidoptera
- List of moths of India
