= Bombyx hybrid =

Scientific classification
- Kingdom: Animalia
- Phylum: Arthropoda
- Class: Insecta
- Order: Lepidoptera
- Family: Bombycidae
- Genus: Bombyx
- Species: B. mandarina♂ × B. mori♀

Species of moth

The Bombyx hybrid is a hybrid between a male Bombyx mandarina moth and a female Bombyx mori moth. They produce larvae called silkworms, like all species of Bombyx. The larvae look a lot like the other variations. They are brown in the first half and gray at the bottom half, but they get larger black spots than other variations. Generally, they look like a normal Bombyx moth, but a bit darker. Hybrids are not used for silk, but for research. Because Bombyx mori males lost their ability to fly, their females are much more likely to mate with a male Bombyx mandarina. The reverse is possible, but both species have to be kept in the same container. Since Bombyx hybrids are much more common than the other variation, more is known about them.

B. mori is a domesticated version of the wild B. mandarina. This domestication occurred over 5,000 years ago.

== See also ==
- Bombyx second hybrid
