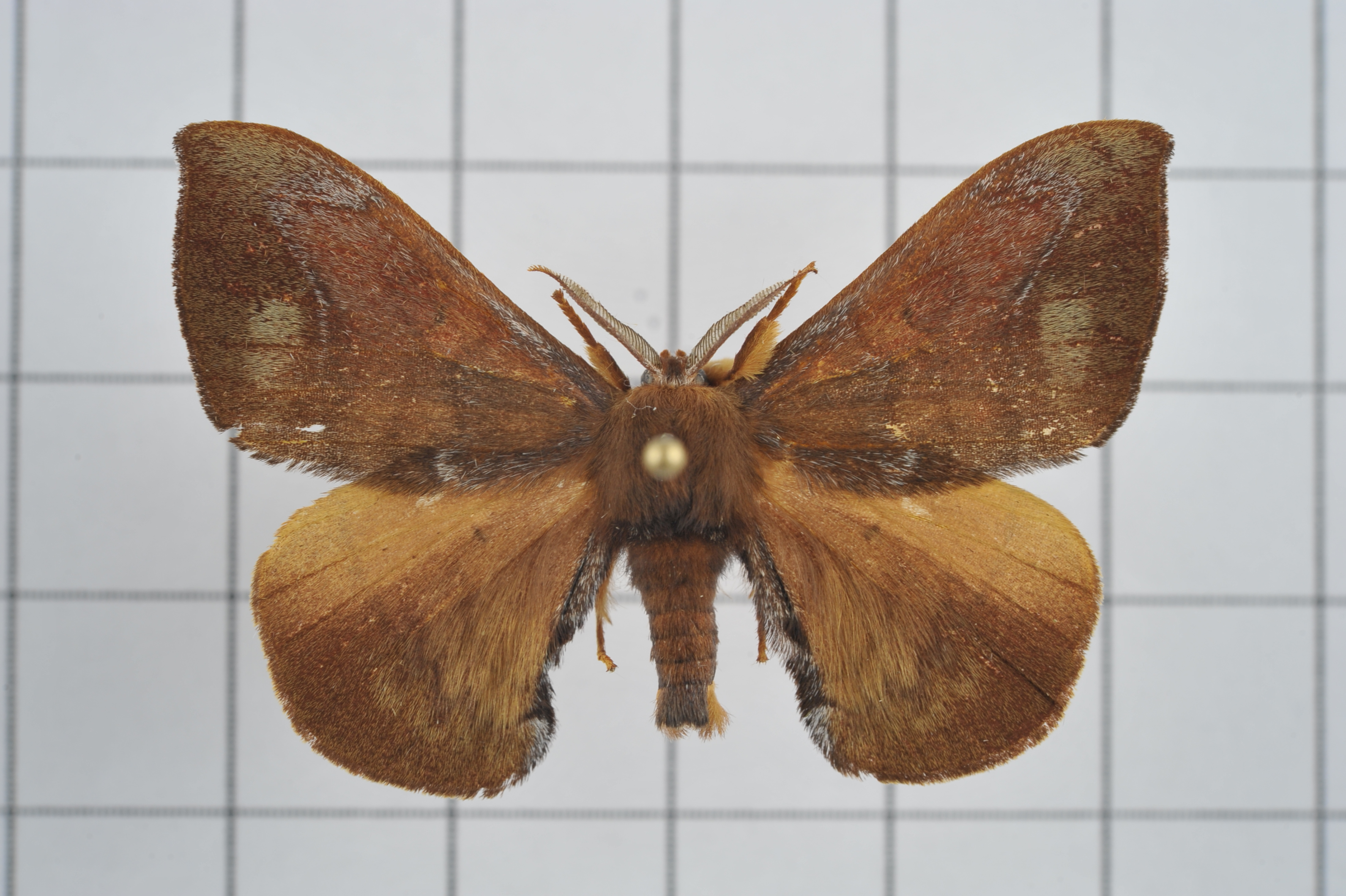
- Andraca yauichui

Scientific classification
- Kingdom: Animalia
- Phylum: Arthropoda
- Class: Insecta
- Order: Lepidoptera
- Family: Endromidae
- Genus: Andraca
- Species: A. yauichui

Binomial name
- Andraca yauichui Wu & Chang, 2016

= Andraca yauichui =

Species of moth

Andraca yauichui is a moth of the Andraca genus of the Endromidae family that is endemic to Taiwan.

== Taxonomy ==
Andraca yauichui was described as a new species in 2016, by Taiwanese lepidopterists Shipher Wu and Wei-Chun Chang. Its specific epithet is dedicated to Dr. Yau-I Chu, a renowned Taiwanese entomologist and Professor Emeritus of the Department of Entomology at National Taiwan University. The type specimen is housed at the Taiwan Forestry Research Institute. It has been misidentified several times in the past as Andraca theae (Matsumura, 1909), a similar-looking species. However, the two can be reliably distinguished by observing their appearance and reproductive organs.

== Distribution and occurrence ==
This species is distributed in the mountainous areas of Taiwan, at elevations ranging from 1,700 to 2,500 m (5,600 to 8,200 ft) above sea level.

== Diet ==
According to the original literature, it is known that the larvae of this species feed on Eurya strigillosa.
