= Andraca paradisea =

Scientific classification
- Kingdom: Animalia
- Phylum: Arthropoda
- Clade: Pancrustacea
- Class: Insecta
- Order: Lepidoptera
- Family: Endromidae
- Genus: Andraca
- Species: A. paradisea

Binomial name
- Andraca paradisea Zolotuhin, 2012

Species of moth

Andraca paradisea is a moth of the family Endromidae. It is found in the Philippines (Mindanao).

The wingspan is 34–41 mm for males and 46–48 mm for females. Adults are on wing from July to mid-January, probably in two generations per year.
