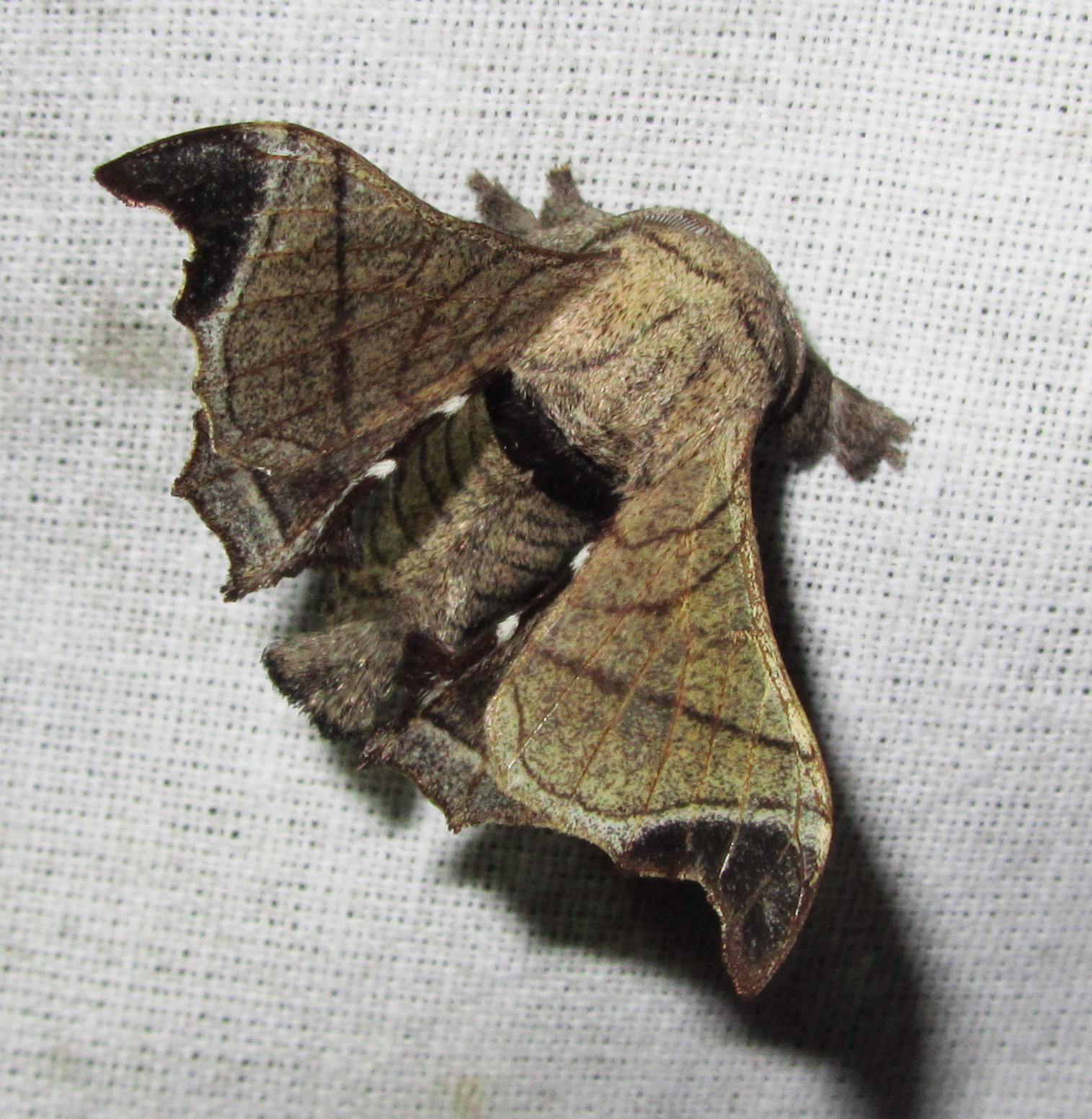

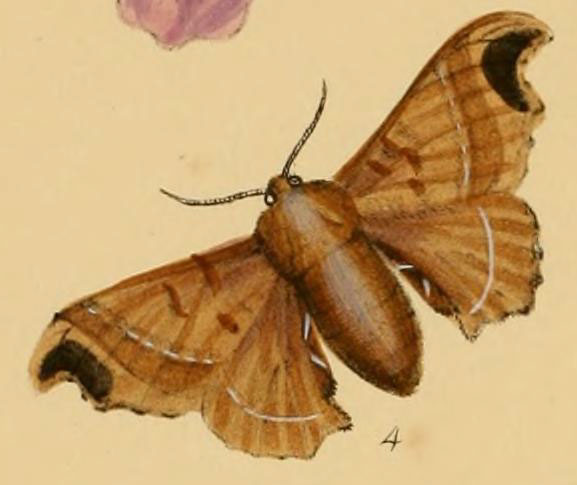
- Illustration accompanying Westwood's description

Scientific classification
- Kingdom: Animalia
- Phylum: Arthropoda
- Clade: Pancrustacea
- Class: Insecta
- Order: Lepidoptera
- Family: Bombycidae
- Genus: Bombyx
- Species: B. huttoni

Binomial name
- Bombyx huttoni Westwood, 1847

Synonyms
- Theophila huttoni (Westwood, 1847); Bombyx bengalensis Moore, 1862; Bombyx sherwilli Hutton, 1865

= Bombyx huttoni =

Species of moth

Bombyx huttoni, or the chocolate-tipped silk moth, is a moth belonging to the silk moth family, Bombycidae. It is closely related to the domestic silk moth (Bombyx mori).

It was described by John O. Westwood in 1847. Westwood named the species after a Captain Thomas Hutton, FRGS of Mussoorie who forwarded the specimen to him. The type specimen was collected by Hutton in Simla in 1837 but illness of the collector and the advent of the First Anglo-Afghan War delayed its dispatch to Europe till 1842. Bombyx huttoni is one of the moths of the superfamily Bombycoidea which have had their complete mitochondrial genome reconstructed from whole-genome Illumina sequencing data.

== Description ==
The wings of the adult moth B. huttoni have concave margins. The wingspan is 40 millimetres (1.6 in) in males and 50 millimetres (2.0 in) in females. The forewings are grey-brown with a dark brown line across the forewing; the innermost lines near the base of the wing are double curves. The tip of the forewing has a dark chocolate-coloured patch. The hindwing is darker. Its inner margin is chequered brown and white with a broad grey border along the outer margin.

== Range ==
It is found in Pakistan, India, Vietnam, Nepal, Bhutan and Taiwan.

It ranges in India from the Northwest Himalayas to Sikkim, Assam and Arunachal Pradesh.

== Natural history ==
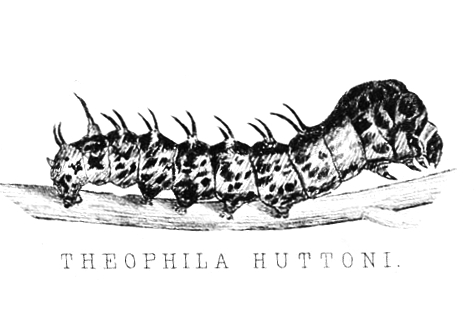
Caterpillar of B. huttoni

The food plant of the wild silk moth B. huttoni is recorded by Hutton as the wild indigenous mulberry tree of the Northwest Himalayas, possibly Morus indica. The moth is bivoltine, with one brood in the spring and the other in the autumn. The eggs are laid in the previous season on bark, either of the trunk, or the underside of the branches, where they are sheltered from rain, snow and dust, and also from predators. They hatch just after the time the mulberry tree comes into leaf in the spring, typically in March. The eggs are similar to those of Bombyx mori but a pale-straw yellow in colour. The caterpillar has black, brown and yellow streaks on its body. The first three segments are enlarged and it has paired-spines at the rear.

Hutton describes the caterpillar in detail as follows:

When the caterpillar is newly hatched its appearance, as seen under a good lens, is as follows :- Head and pro-legs shining jet black; body dark brown, approaching to black; the first segment whitish-ash, the fourth pale rufous, as are the anal feet; tubercles disposed in longitudinal rows, giving forth short tufts of hair; a small anal tubercle on the penultimate segment: thus far there is scarcely a difference between it and the young Chinese worm. Length fully 1/8th of an inch: strong and robust, as compared with the best domestic stock. In the course of a, day or two, the four anterior segments become greatly swollen and of a faint livid cream colour, the dorsal portion being mottled or dotted with deep brown; the orange or rufous colour of the fourth segment somewhat deeper.
About the fourth day the four anterior segments become swollen up very remarkably into a globular form, the dark spots being apparently beneath the skin; the rest of the body dark brown, with here and there a tinge of dull yellowish. On the fifth day they prepared to moult. After the first moult, the second and third segments form a globular ball, apparently out of all proportion to the rest of the body; the general ground colour becomes creamy-white, with the fourth segment yellow, the second and third being dotted above with dull leaden-grey; the remainder closely marbled over, or variegated without any definite arrangement, with black, grey, orange, ash and yellow blending like tortoise-shell; the fleshy tubercles or spines short, conical and brown; skin smooth. In the subsequent stages the general appearance remains the same, except that the spines are long and taper to a point, being fleshy at the base, but becoming somewhat horny towards the summits; all bend backwards in a curve except the central one on the penultimate segment, which lies down horizontally and points forward.

The cocoon is whitish in colour and of a "soft loose consistence, not unlike the cocoons of some Bengal Bombyx silk worms, but is much less compact; it is formed between the leaves of the food plant".

However, the caterpillars are so numerous as to denude the mulberry tree including the leaves in which cocoons have already been spun forcing the caterpillars to die of hunger or to descend the tree and spin their cocoons on nearby bushes and plants, during which they fall prey to birds. The mulberry tree sets forth shoots and leaves by end June and well in time for the autumnal brood.

Hutton reports the silk of wild B. huttoni moths to be of the best quality but not commercially viable due to uncertainties of supply in the wild. Hutton attempted to farm the moths for silk but found it impractical due to the tendency of caterpillars to wander off trays while being raised and their resultant predation. The moth also did not cross-breed with related wild silk moth species in his experiments, forcing him to conclude his enterprise.
