= Trilocha myodes =

Scientific classification
- Domain: Eukaryota
- Kingdom: Animalia
- Phylum: Arthropoda
- Class: Insecta
- Order: Lepidoptera
- Family: Bombycidae
- Genus: Trilocha
- Species: T. myodes

Binomial name
- Trilocha myodes West, 1932

Species of moth

Trilocha myodes is a moth in the family Bombycidae first described by West in 1932. It is found in the Philippines.

The wingspan is 23–29 mm. Adults are variable, ranging in colour from yellowish brown to brown and dark grey brown.
