= Andraca stueningi =

Scientific classification
- Kingdom: Animalia
- Phylum: Arthropoda
- Clade: Pancrustacea
- Class: Insecta
- Order: Lepidoptera
- Family: Endromidae
- Genus: Andraca
- Species: A. stueningi

Binomial name
- Andraca stueningi Zolotuhin & Witt, 2009

Species of moth

Andraca stueningi is a moth of the family Endromidae. It is found in Vietnam.
