= Bombyx shini =

Scientific classification
- Kingdom: Animalia
- Phylum: Arthropoda
- Class: Insecta
- Order: Lepidoptera
- Family: Bombycidae
- Genus: Bombyx
- Species: B. shini

Binomial name
- Bombyx shini Park & Sohn, 2002

Species of moth

Bombyx shini is a moth in the family Bombycidae. It was described by Kyu-Tek Park and Jae-Cheon Sohn in 2002. It is found in Korea.
