= Gunda subnotata =

Scientific classification
- Kingdom: Animalia
- Phylum: Arthropoda
- Class: Insecta
- Order: Lepidoptera
- Family: Bombycidae
- Genus: Gunda
- Species: G. subnotata

Binomial name
- Gunda subnotata (Walker, 1859)

Synonyms
- Bombyx subnotata Walker, 1859; Hanisa subnotata

Species of moth

Gunda subnotata is a species of moth in the family Bombycidae. It was described by Francis Walker in 1859. It is found in Singapore and on Peninsular Malaysia, Sumatra, Borneo and Palawan. The habitat consists of both montane and lowland areas.
