= Trilocha pallescens =

Scientific classification
- Domain: Eukaryota
- Kingdom: Animalia
- Phylum: Arthropoda
- Class: Insecta
- Order: Lepidoptera
- Family: Bombycidae
- Genus: Trilocha
- Species: T. pallescens

Binomial name
- Trilocha pallescens Schaus, 1921

Species of moth

Trilocha pallescens is a moth in the family Bombycidae. It was described by William Schaus in 1921. It is found in Brazil.
