= Andraca lawa =

Scientific classification
- Kingdom: Animalia
- Phylum: Arthropoda
- Clade: Pancrustacea
- Class: Insecta
- Order: Lepidoptera
- Family: Endromidae
- Genus: Andraca
- Species: A. lawa

Binomial name
- Andraca lawa Zolotuhin, 2012

Species of moth

Andraca lawa is a moth of the family Endromidae. It is found in the Philippines (Palawan).

The wingspan is 39–48 mm for males and about 60 mm for females. Adults are on wing in March, July, August, October and November, probably in two or more generations per year.
