= Trilocha pulcherioides =

Scientific classification
- Domain: Eukaryota
- Kingdom: Animalia
- Phylum: Arthropoda
- Class: Insecta
- Order: Lepidoptera
- Family: Bombycidae
- Genus: Trilocha
- Species: T. pulcherioides

Binomial name
- Trilocha pulcherioides (Thiaucourt, 2009)

Synonyms
- Naprepa pulcherioides Thiaucourt, 2009

Species of moth

Trilocha pulcherioides is a moth in the family Bombycidae. It was described by Paul Thiaucourt in 2009. It is found in Peru.
