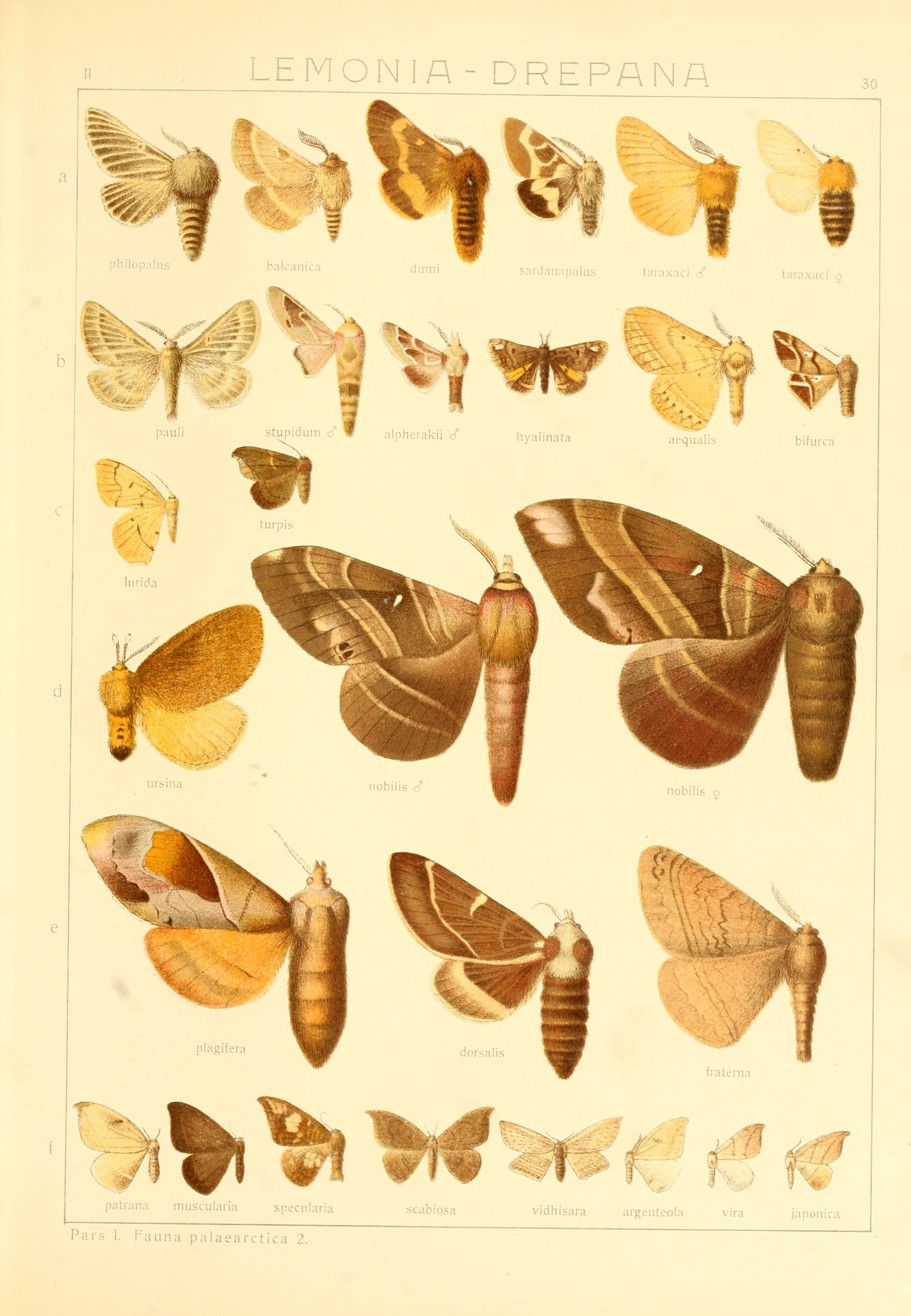

Scientific classification
- Domain: Eukaryota
- Kingdom: Animalia
- Phylum: Arthropoda
- Class: Insecta
- Order: Lepidoptera
- Family: Bombycidae
- Genus: Rondotia
- Species: R. lineata

Binomial name
- Rondotia lineata Leech, 1898

Synonyms
- Rondotia lurida Fixsen, 1887

= Rondotia lineata =

Species of moth

Rondotia lineata is a moth in the family Bombycidae. It was described by John Henry Leech in 1898. It is found in China and Korea.
