= Gunda aroa =

Scientific classification
- Domain: Eukaryota
- Kingdom: Animalia
- Phylum: Arthropoda
- Class: Insecta
- Order: Lepidoptera
- Family: Bombycidae
- Genus: Gunda
- Species: G. aroa

Binomial name
- Gunda aroa Bethune-Baker, 1904

Species of moth

Gunda aroa is a species of moth in the family Bombycidae. It was described by George Thomas Bethune-Baker in 1904 . It is found in New Guinea.

The wingspan is about 50mm. The forewings are blackish brown, the costa ochreous grey to beyond the cell and the medial area with a brownish tinge. The hindwings are blackish, with the apex and termen brown to near the inner angle.
