= Gunda engonata =

Scientific classification
- Domain: Eukaryota
- Kingdom: Animalia
- Phylum: Arthropoda
- Class: Insecta
- Order: Lepidoptera
- Family: Bombycidae
- Genus: Gunda
- Species: G. engonata

Binomial name
- Gunda engonata (C. Swinhoe, 1899)

Synonyms
- Clenora engonata C. Swinhoe, 1899

Species of moth

Gunda engonata is a species of moth from the Bombycidae family. It was described by Charles Swinhoe in 1899. It is found in India.

The larvae have been recorded feeding on Ficus species.
