= Andraca trilochoides =

Scientific classification
- Kingdom: Animalia
- Phylum: Arthropoda
- Class: Insecta
- Order: Lepidoptera
- Family: Endromidae
- Genus: Andraca
- Species: A. trilochoides

Binomial name
- Andraca trilochoides Moore, 1865

Synonyms
- Andraca roepkei Bryk, 1944; Andraca henosa Chu et Wang, 1993

Species of moth

Andraca trilochoides is a moth of the family Endromidae. It is found in south-east Asia, including India, Burma and Vietnam.

== Subspecies ==
- Andraca trilochoides trilochoides (India)
- Andraca trilochoides roepkei Bryk, 1944 (Burma, Vietnam)
