= Trilocha friedeli =

Scientific classification
- Domain: Eukaryota
- Kingdom: Animalia
- Phylum: Arthropoda
- Class: Insecta
- Order: Lepidoptera
- Family: Bombycidae
- Genus: Trilocha
- Species: T. friedeli

Binomial name
- Trilocha friedeli Dierl, 1978

Species of moth

Trilocha friedeli is a moth in the family Bombycidae. It was described by Wolfgang Dierl in 1978. It is found in Thailand and Vietnam, as well as on Peninsular Malaysia and Borneo. The habitat consists of hill dipterocarp forests and lower montane forests.

The wingspan is 20–25 mm.
