= Bombyx horsfieldi =

Scientific classification
- Domain: Eukaryota
- Kingdom: Animalia
- Phylum: Arthropoda
- Class: Insecta
- Order: Lepidoptera
- Family: Bombycidae
- Genus: Bombyx
- Species: B. horsfieldi

Binomial name
- Bombyx horsfieldi Moore, 1860

Species of moth

Bombyx horsfieldi is a moth in the family Bombycidae. It was described by Frederic Moore in 1860. It is found in Taiwan.
