= Bombyx lemeepauli =

Scientific classification
- Domain: Eukaryota
- Kingdom: Animalia
- Phylum: Arthropoda
- Class: Insecta
- Order: Lepidoptera
- Family: Bombycidae
- Genus: Bombyx
- Species: B. lemeepauli

Binomial name
- Bombyx lemeepauli Lemée, 1950

Synonyms
- Theophila albicurva Chu & Wang, 1993

Species of moth

Bombyx lemeepauli is a species of Bombycidae in the genus Bombyx. It was described by Albert Marie Victor Lemée in 1950. It is found in Vietnam and China.
