= Trilocha guianensis =

Scientific classification
- Domain: Eukaryota
- Kingdom: Animalia
- Phylum: Arthropoda
- Class: Insecta
- Order: Lepidoptera
- Family: Bombycidae
- Genus: Trilocha
- Species: T. guianensis

Binomial name
- Trilocha guianensis (Thiaucourt, 2009)

Synonyms
- Naprepa guianensis Thiaucourt, 2009

Species of moth

Trilocha guianensis is a moth in the family Bombycidae. It was described by Paul Thiaucourt in 2009. It is found in French Guiana.
