= Trilocha arabica =

Scientific classification
- Kingdom: Animalia
- Phylum: Arthropoda
- Class: Insecta
- Order: Lepidoptera
- Family: Bombycidae
- Genus: Trilocha
- Species: T. arabica

Binomial name
- Trilocha arabica Wiltshire, 1982

Synonyms
- Ocinara arabica

Species of moth

Trilocha arabica is a moth in the Bombycidae family. It was described by Wiltshire in 1982. It is found in Saudi Arabia.
