= Trilocha annae =

Scientific classification
- Domain: Eukaryota
- Kingdom: Animalia
- Phylum: Arthropoda
- Class: Insecta
- Order: Lepidoptera
- Family: Bombycidae
- Genus: Trilocha
- Species: T. annae

Binomial name
- Trilocha annae (Thiaucourt, 1997)

Synonyms
- Naprepa annae Thiaucourt, 1997

Species of moth

Trilocha annae is a moth in the family Bombycidae. It was described by Paul Thiaucourt in 1997. It is found in Napo Province, Ecuador.
