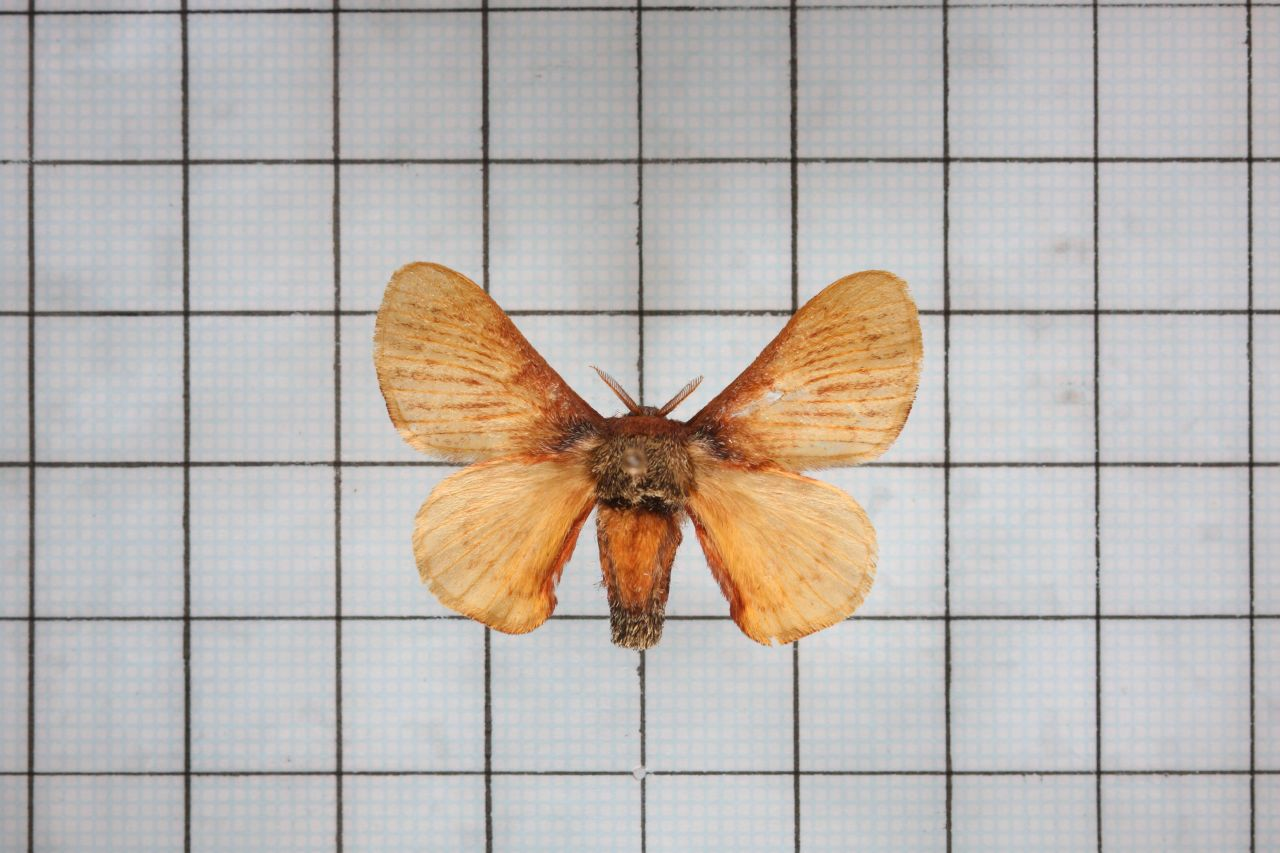

Scientific classification
- Domain: Eukaryota
- Kingdom: Animalia
- Phylum: Arthropoda
- Class: Insecta
- Order: Lepidoptera
- Family: Bombycidae
- Genus: Bombyx
- Species: B. rotundapex

Binomial name
- Bombyx rotundapex Miyata & Kishida, 1990

= Bombyx rotundapex =

Species of moth

Bombyx rotundapex is a moth of the family Bombycidae. It is found in Taiwan.
