= Andraca chrysocollis =

Scientific classification
- Kingdom: Animalia
- Phylum: Arthropoda
- Clade: Pancrustacea
- Class: Insecta
- Order: Lepidoptera
- Family: Endromidae
- Genus: Andraca
- Species: A. chrysocollis

Binomial name
- Andraca chrysocollis Zolotuhin, 2012

Species of moth

Andraca chrysocollis is a moth of the family Endromidae. It is found in the Philippines (Luzon).

The wingspan is 39–42 mm. Adults are on wing in April and from September to October, probably in multiple generations per year.
