= Gunda proxima =

Scientific classification
- Domain: Eukaryota
- Kingdom: Animalia
- Phylum: Arthropoda
- Class: Insecta
- Order: Lepidoptera
- Family: Bombycidae
- Genus: Gunda
- Species: G. proxima

Binomial name
- Gunda proxima Roepke, 1924

Synonyms
- Clenora epigrypa West, 1932; Clemora epigrypa; Theophoba ostruma Chu & Wang, 1993

Species of moth

Gunda proxima is a species of moth in the family Bombycidae. It was described by Roepke in 1924. It is found in Asia, including Indonesia and Vietnam.

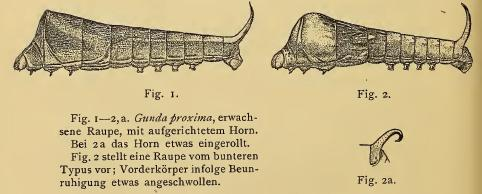
Illustration of larva

The wingspan is 45–50 mm for females and 32–34 mm for males.

The larvae have been recorded feeding on Ficus elastica.
