= Andraca draco =

Scientific classification
- Kingdom: Animalia
- Phylum: Arthropoda
- Clade: Pancrustacea
- Class: Insecta
- Order: Lepidoptera
- Family: Endromidae
- Genus: Andraca
- Species: A. draco

Binomial name
- Andraca draco Zolotuhin, 2012

Species of moth

Andraca draco is a moth of the family Endromidae. It is found on Java.

The wingspan is 44–45 mm for males and about 59 mm for females. Adults are on wing from February to July, probably in multiple generations per year.
