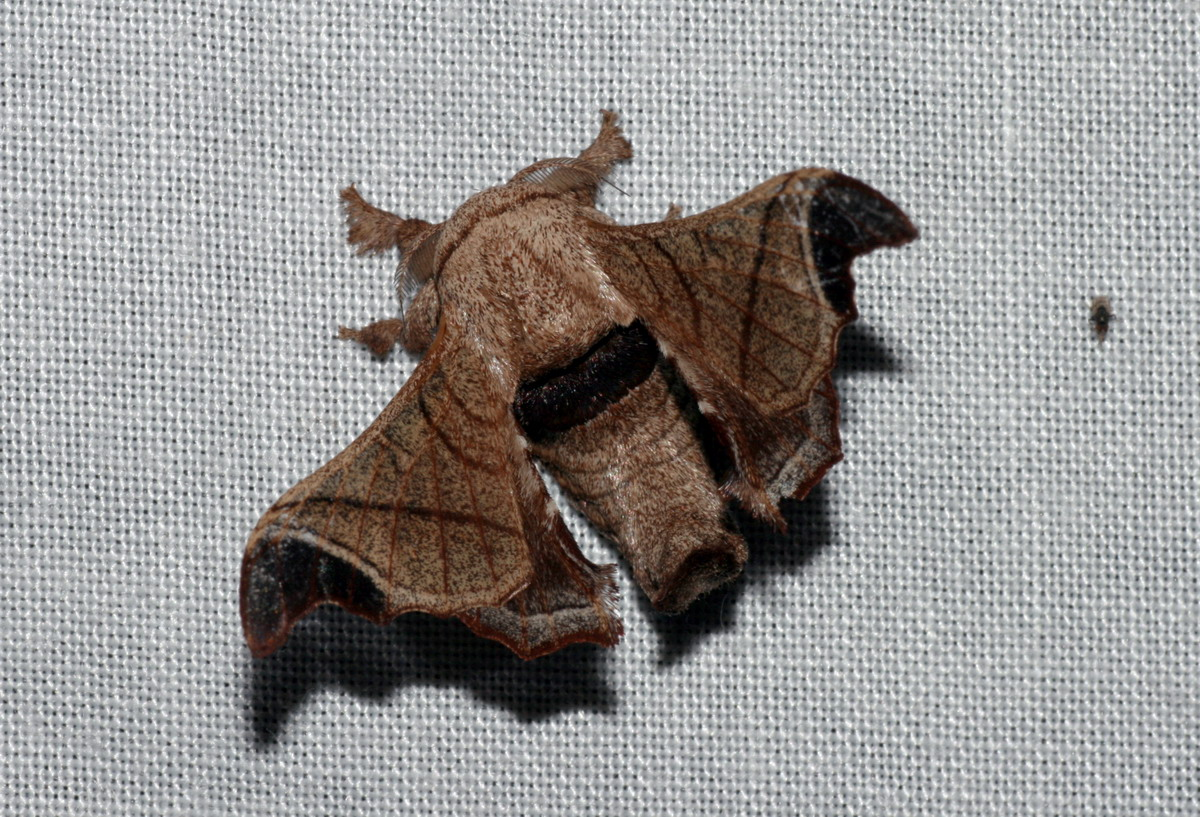

Scientific classification
- Domain: Eukaryota
- Kingdom: Animalia
- Phylum: Arthropoda
- Class: Insecta
- Order: Lepidoptera
- Family: Bombycidae
- Genus: Bombyx
- Species: B. incomposita

Binomial name
- Bombyx incomposita (van Eecke, 1929)

Synonyms
- Theophila incomposita van Eecke, 1929

= Bombyx incomposita =

Species of moth

Bombyx incomposita is a moth in the family Bombycidae. It was described by van Eecke in 1929. It is found on Sumatra, Peninsular Malaysia and Borneo. The habitat consists of lowland rainforests.
