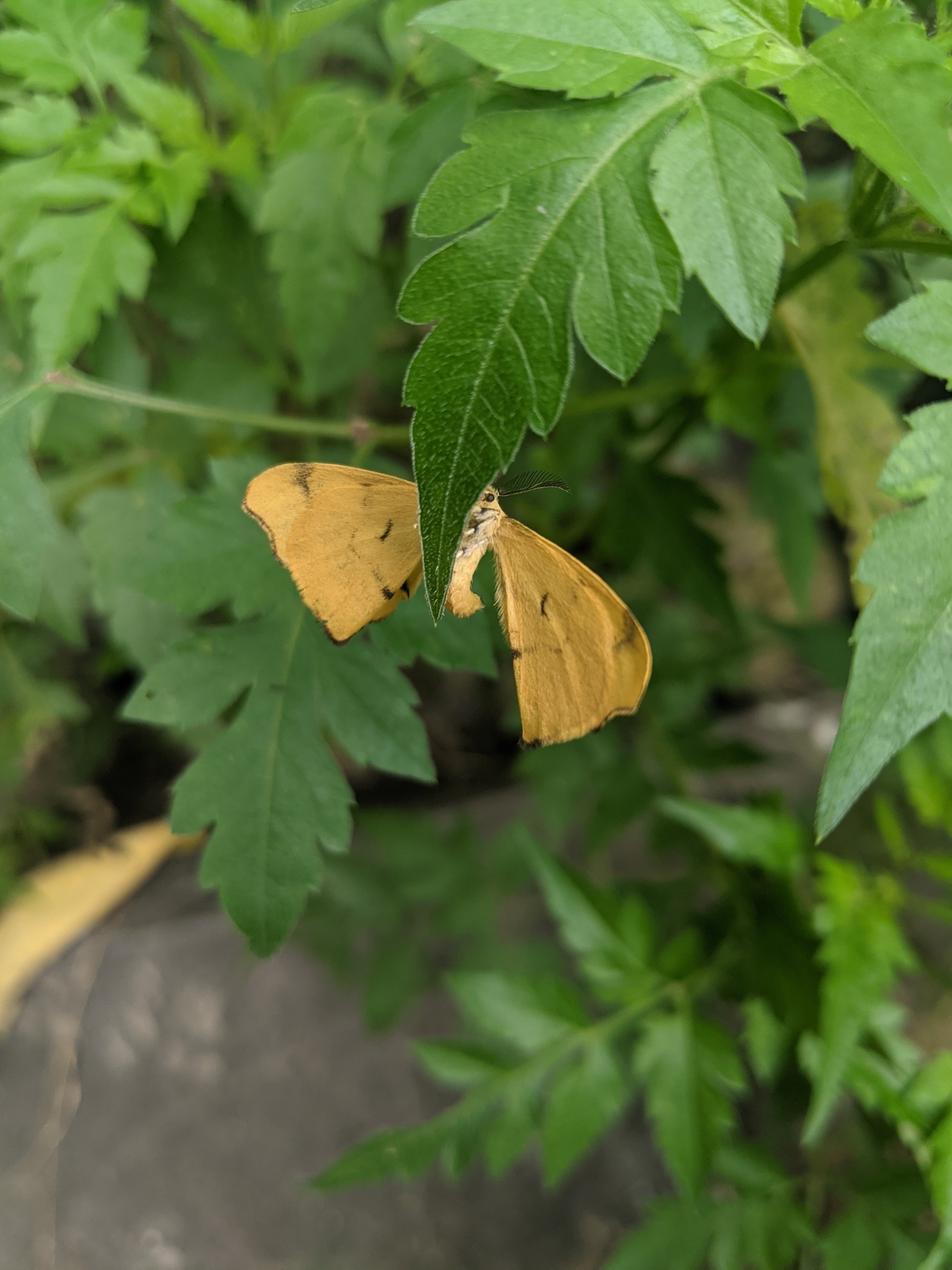

Scientific classification
- Kingdom: Animalia
- Phylum: Arthropoda
- Class: Insecta
- Order: Lepidoptera
- Family: Bombycidae
- Genus: Rondotia
- Species: R. menciana

Binomial name
- Rondotia menciana Moore, 1885

= Rondotia menciana =

Species of moth

Rondotia menciana is a moth in the family Bombycidae. It was described by Frederic Moore in 1885. It is found in Zhejiang, China.
