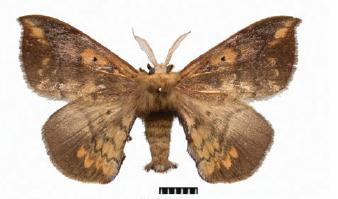

Scientific classification
- Kingdom: Animalia
- Phylum: Arthropoda
- Class: Insecta
- Order: Lepidoptera
- Family: Endromidae
- Genus: Andraca
- Species: A. flavamaculata

Binomial name
- Andraca flavamaculata Yang, 1995

Synonyms
- Andraca nabesan Kishida & Owada, 2002; Pseudandraca flavamaculata

= Andraca flavamaculata =

Species of moth

Andraca flavamaculata is a moth of the family Endromidae. It is found in China (Zhejiang, Hunan, Guangdong, Guangxi) and Vietnam.

The wingspan is 40–44 mm. Adults have a stout body. The forewing apex is falcate, the outer edge is smooth and straight and the tornus is almost rectangular.
