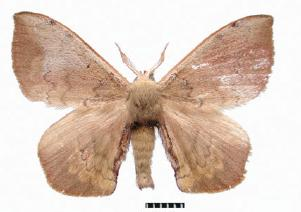

Scientific classification
- Kingdom: Animalia
- Phylum: Arthropoda
- Class: Insecta
- Order: Lepidoptera
- Family: Endromidae
- Genus: Andraca
- Species: A. olivacea

Binomial name
- Andraca olivacea Matsumura, 1927

Synonyms
- Andraca hedra Chu & Wang, 1993

= Andraca olivacea =

Species of moth

Andraca olivacea is a moth of the family Endromidae. It is found in China (Fujian, Guangdong, Guangxi, Hainan), Taiwan and Vietnam.

The wingspan is 36–38 mm (1.4–1.5 in).

The larvae feed on Ficus concinna var. pusillifolia.

== Subspecies ==
- Andraca olivacea olivacea
- Andraca olivacea olivacens Mell, 1958 (Fujian)
