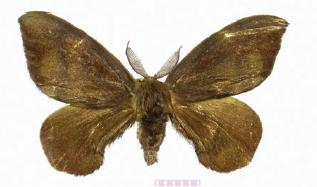

Scientific classification
- Kingdom: Animalia
- Phylum: Arthropoda
- Clade: Pancrustacea
- Class: Insecta
- Order: Lepidoptera
- Family: Endromidae
- Genus: Andraca
- Species: A. melli

Binomial name
- Andraca melli Zolotuhin & Witt, 2009

= Andraca melli =

Species of moth

Andraca melli is a moth of the family Endromidae. It is found in China (Zhejiang, Jiangxi, Fujian, Guangdong, Hainan), Vietnam and Thailand.

The wingspan is 37–39 millimetres (1.5–1.5 in). The head is thinly covered with brown-green hairs. The forewings are bluntly pointed apically and the outer edge is smooth and straight. The tornus is nearly rectangular.

The larvae feed on Camellia sinensis, Camellia oleifera, Fraxinus pennsylvanica, Ternstroemia japonica and Pentaphylax euryoides.
