= Andraca nobilorum =

Scientific classification
- Kingdom: Animalia
- Phylum: Arthropoda
- Class: Insecta
- Order: Lepidoptera
- Family: Endromidae
- Genus: Andraca
- Species: A. nobilorum

Binomial name
- Andraca nobilorum Zolotuhin, 2012

Species of moth

Andraca nobilorum is a moth of the family Endromidae. It is found in central Vietnam and south-eastern China (Guangxi).

The wingspan is 38–39 mm. Adults have been recorded on wing in April and June.

== Subspecies ==
- Andraca nobilorum nobilorum (Vietnam)
- Andraca nobilorum houtuae Wang & Zolotuhin, 2012 (China: Guangxi)
