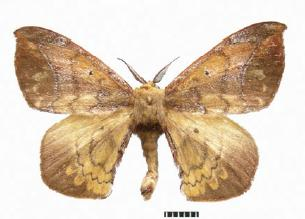

Scientific classification
- Kingdom: Animalia
- Phylum: Arthropoda
- Class: Insecta
- Order: Lepidoptera
- Family: Endromidae
- Genus: Andraca
- Species: A. gongshanensis

Binomial name
- Andraca gongshanensis Wang, Zeng & Wang, 2011

= Andraca gongshanensis =

Species of moth

Andraca gongshanensis is a moth of the family Endromidae. It is found in China (Yunnan).

The wingspan is 46–48 mm. The ground colour of the wings is dark brown with dark brow fasciae and reddish-yellow patterns, consisting of antemedian, discocellar, postmedian fascia, and reddish-yellow patterns placed on nearly the whole wing except the termen. The forewing apex is falcate and the outer edge is smooth and straight. The tornus is almost rectangular.

== Etymology ==
The specific epithet refers to the type locality (the Gongshan Mountain in China).
