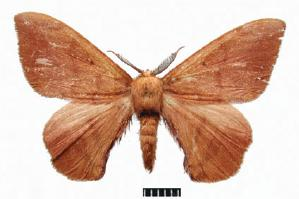

Scientific classification
- Kingdom: Animalia
- Phylum: Arthropoda
- Class: Insecta
- Order: Lepidoptera
- Family: Endromidae
- Genus: Andraca
- Species: A. apodecta

Binomial name
- Andraca apodecta C. Swinhoe, 1907

= Andraca apodecta =

Species of moth

Andraca apodecta is a moth of the family Endromidae first described by Charles Swinhoe in 1907. It is found in China (Guangxi, Yunnan, Fujian, Shaanxi), Vietnam, Thailand (Chiang Mai, Nan) and Indonesia (Sumatra, Borneo, Sulawesi).

The wingspan is 37–39 mm. The head is covered with reddish-brown hairs. There is a black discal spot on the forewing, which has a smooth outer margin and is not falcate apically.
