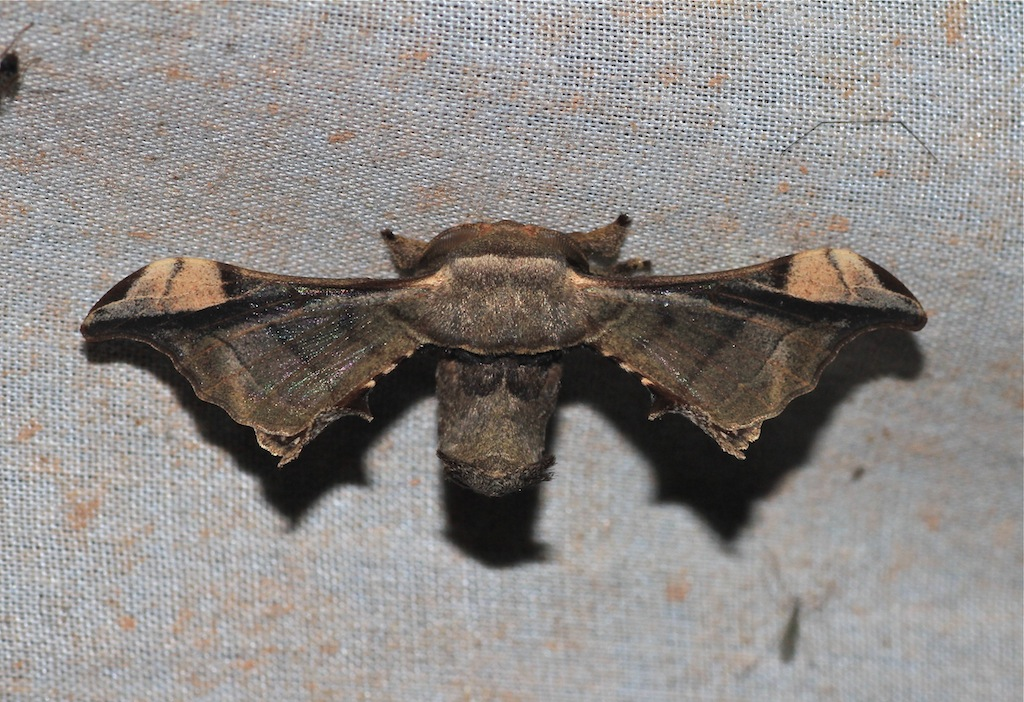

Scientific classification
- Kingdom: Animalia
- Phylum: Arthropoda
- Class: Insecta
- Order: Lepidoptera
- Family: Bombycidae
- Genus: Gunda
- Species: G. javanica

Binomial name
- Gunda javanica (Moore, 1872)

Synonyms
- Norasuma javanica Moore, 1872; Norasuma richteri Weymer, 1890; Gunda javanica palawana Schultze, 1925; Gunda tonkinensis Lemee, 1950

= Gunda javanica =

Species of moth

Gunda javanica is a moth of the family Bombycidae first described by Frederic Moore in 1872. It is found in the north-eastern parts of the Himalayas, Myanmar, Sundaland, Palawan and Sulawesi. The habitat consists of lowland rainforest.
