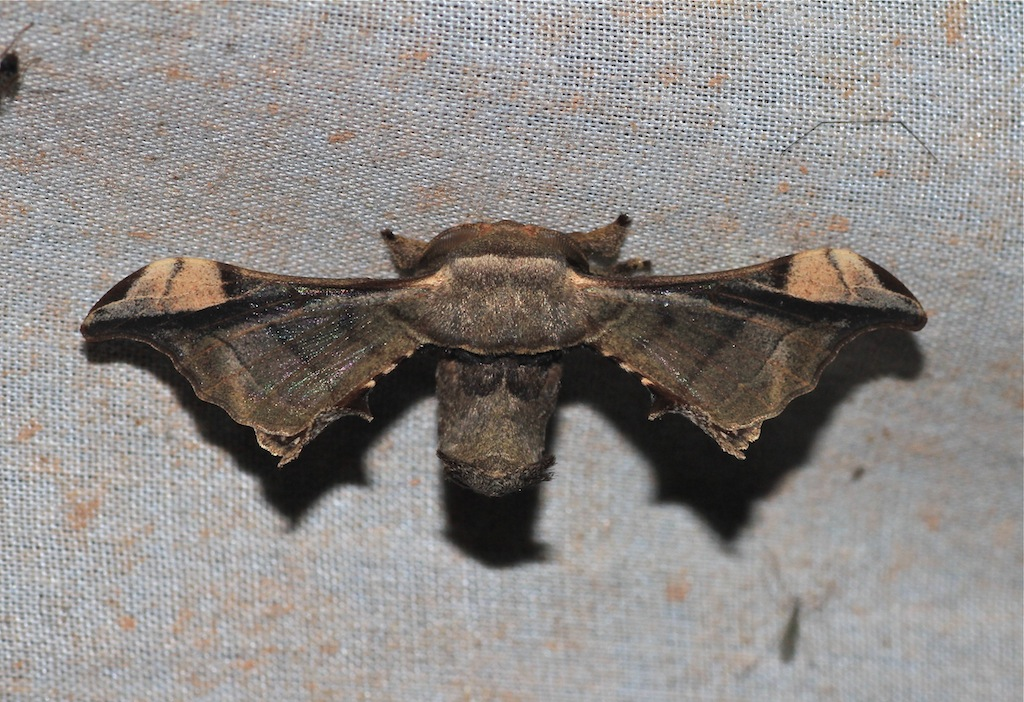
- Gunda javanica from Borneo

Scientific classification
- Kingdom: Animalia
- Phylum: Arthropoda
- Class: Insecta
- Order: Lepidoptera
- Family: Bombycidae
- Subfamily: Bombycinae
- Genus: Gunda; Walker, 1862

Synonyms
- Norasuma Moore, 1872; Aristhala Moore, 1878; Clenora Swinhoe, 1899; Clenera West, 1932; Hanisa Moore, 1879

= Gunda =

Genus of moths

Gunda is a genus of moths of the family Bombycidae (silk moths). The genus was erected by Francis Walker in 1862. It is primarily an Oriental genus, found in India, China and South-east Asia.

== Species ==
- Gunda aroa Bethune-Baker, 1904
- Gunda engonata (Swinhoe, 1899)
- Gunda javanica (Moore, 1872)
- Gunda ochracea Walker, 1862
- Gunda proxima Roepke, 1924
- Gunda subnotata (Walker, 1859)
- Gunda thwaitesii (Moore, 1883)
