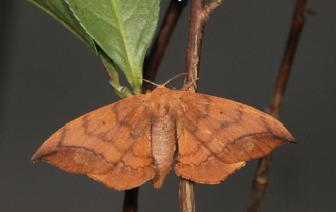

Scientific classification
- Kingdom: Animalia
- Phylum: Arthropoda
- Class: Insecta
- Order: Lepidoptera
- Family: Endromidae
- Genus: Andraca; Walker, 1865

Type species
- Andraca bipunctata Walker, 1865

Synonyms
- Pseudoeupterote Shiraki, 1911

= Andraca =

Genus of moths

Andraca is a genus of moths of the family Endromidae.

The genus had been placed in the family Bombycidae for over 150 years, but was recently transferred to family Endromidae based on the molecular study of Zwick et al. in 2011.

== Species ==
- Subgenus Andraca
  - Andraca bipunctata Walker, 1865
  - Andraca draco Zolotuhin, 2012
  - Andraca lawa Zolotuhin, 2012
  - Andraca stueningi Zolotuhin & Witt, 2009
  - Andraca trilochoides Moore, 1865
    - Andraca trilochoides roepkei Bryk, 1944
    - Andraca trilochoides trilochoides Moore, 1865
- Subgenus Chrypathemola Zolotuhin, 2012
  - Andraca apodecta Swinhoe, 1907
  - Andraca chrysocollis Zolotuhin, 2012
  - Andraca melli Zolotuhin & Witt, 2009
  - Andraca nobilorum Zolotuhin, 2012
  - Andraca olivacea Matsumura, 1927
    - Andraca olivacea olivacea Matsumura, 1927
    - Andraca olivacea olivacens Mell, 1958
  - Andraca paradisea Zolotuhin, 2012
  - Andraca theae Matsumura, 1909
- Subgenus unknown
  - Andraca flavamaculata (Yang, 1995)
  - Andraca gongshanensis Wang, Zeng & Wang, 2011
  - Andraca yauichui Wu & Chang, 2016

== Former species ==
- Andraca angulata Kishida, 1993
