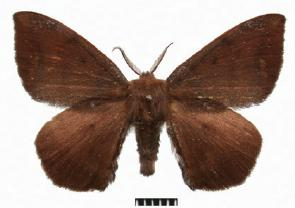

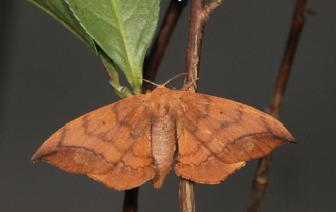

Scientific classification
- Kingdom: Animalia
- Phylum: Arthropoda
- Class: Insecta
- Order: Lepidoptera
- Family: Endromidae
- Genus: Andraca
- Species: A. theae

Binomial name
- Andraca theae (Matsumura, 1909)

Synonyms
- Oreta theae Matsumura, 1909

= Andraca theae =

Species of moth

Andraca theae is a moth of the family Endromidae. It is widely distributed in Taiwan and Southern China.

The wingspan is 35–37 mm. The head is densely covered with dark brown hairs. The forewing apex is inconspicuously falcate and the exterior margin is straight. The forewings and hindwings each have a dark discal spot.

The larvae feed on the leaves of Camellia tenuifolia and Camellia sinensis.

== Gallery ==
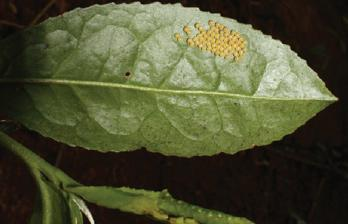
Eggs

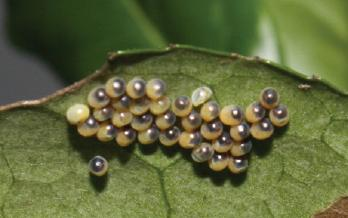
Eggs

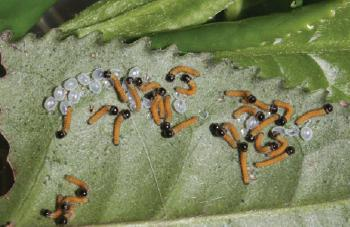
First instar larvae

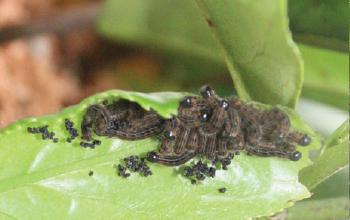
Third instar larvae

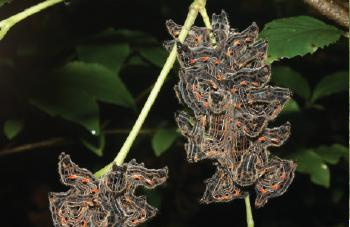
Final instar larvae

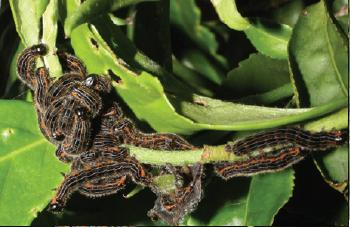
Final instar larvae

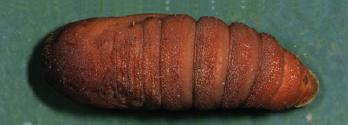
Pupa

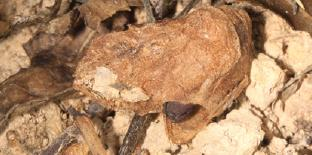
Cocoon
