= Lao silk =

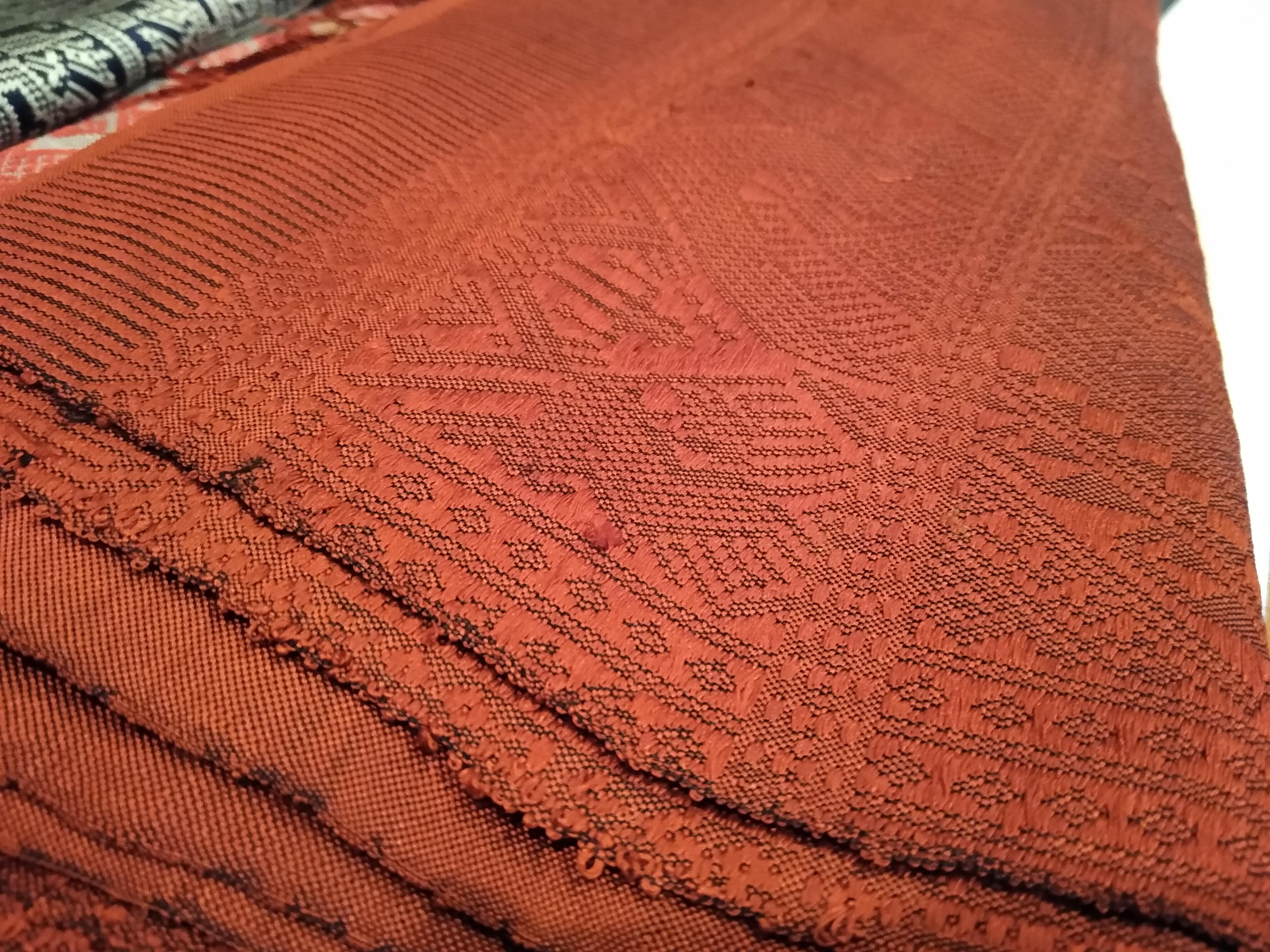
A Lao silk pha biang

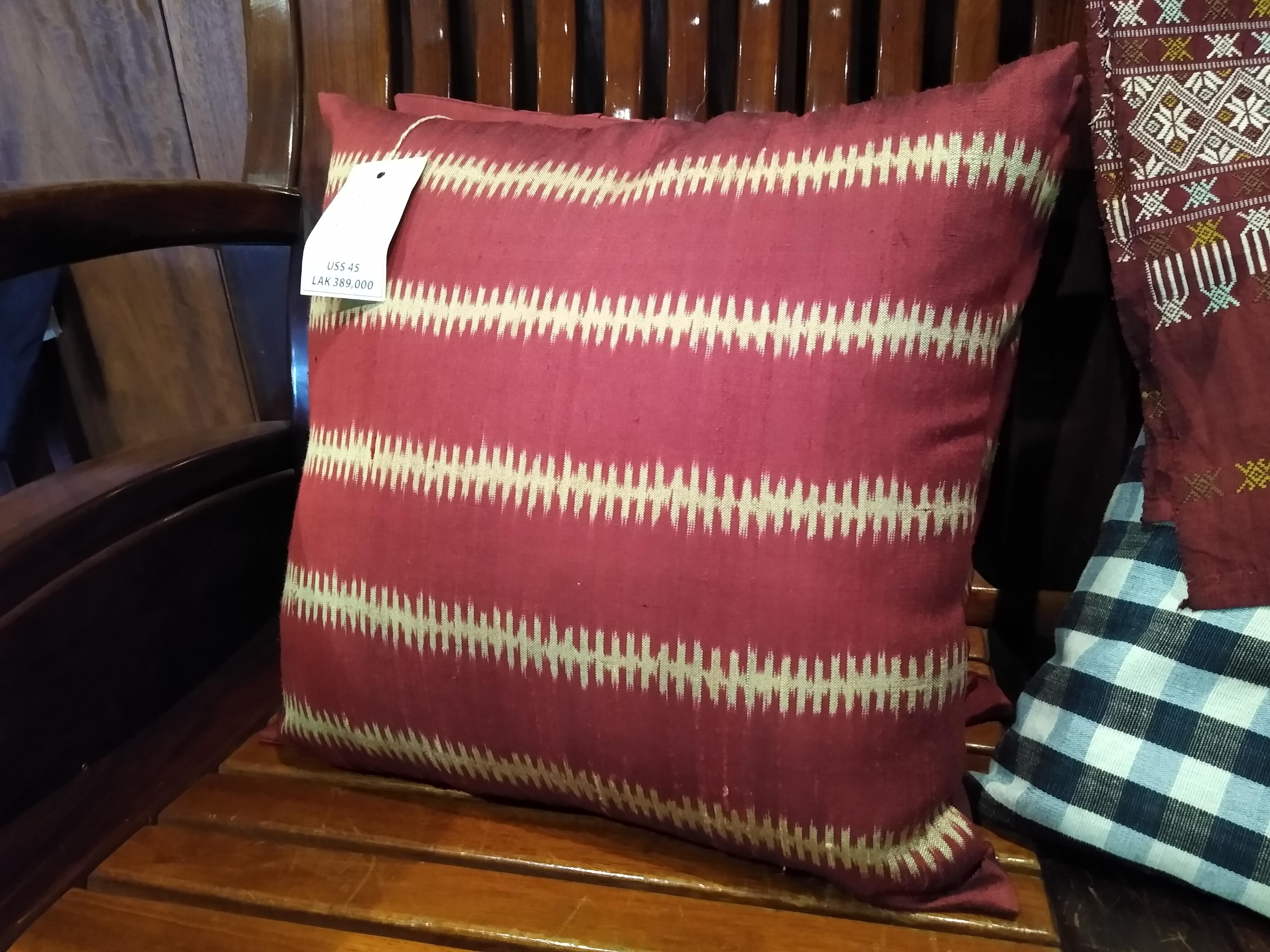
A Lao silk pillowcase

Lao silk is produced in Laos with ancient weaving techniques that produce high quality silk. This woven cloth has traditionally been used for a wide range of purposes, including religious, ritual, and everyday uses. It is used for garments and home decorations by both upper class and rural individuals. Traditional patterns use bold color combinations, such as red and yellow.
