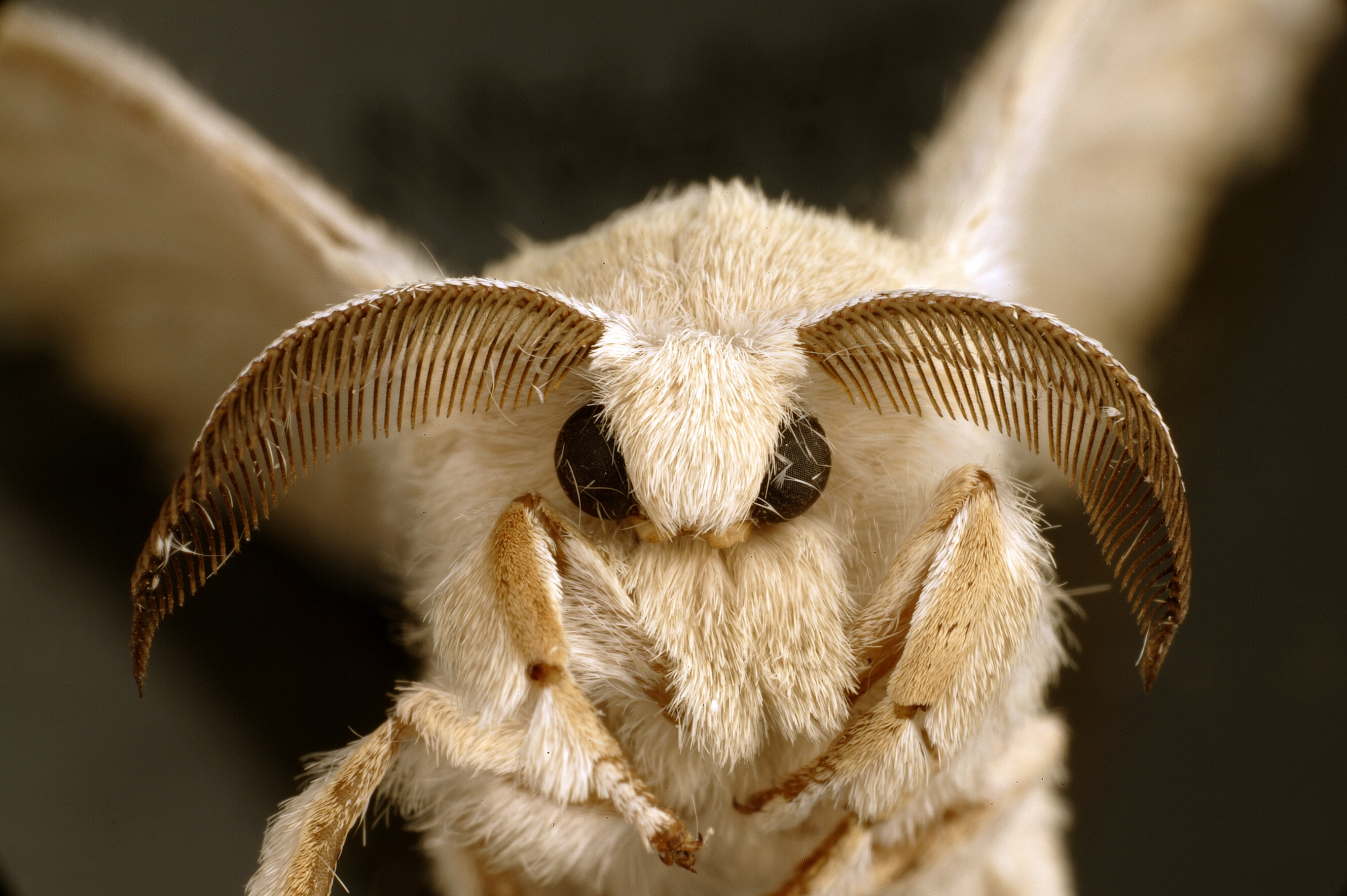
- Bombyx mori, the silk moth.

Scientific classification
- Kingdom: Animalia
- Phylum: Arthropoda
- Clade: Pancrustacea
- Class: Insecta
- Order: Lepidoptera
- Family: Bombycidae
- Subfamily: Bombycinae
- Genus: Bombyx; Linnaeus, 1758

Type species
- Phalaena mori Linnaeus, 1758

Synonyms
- Theophila Moore, 1862

= Bombyx =

Genus of moths

Bombyx is the genus of true silk moths or mulberry silk moths of the family Bombycidae, also known as silkworms, which are the larvae or caterpillars of silk moths. The genus was erected as a subgenus by Carl Linnaeus in his 10th edition of Systema Naturae (1758).

== Etymology ==
The word bombyx comes from Ancient Greek βόμβυξ, which means "silk-worm" or "silk garment".

== Species ==
- Bombyx horsfieldi (Moore, 1860)
- Bombyx huttoni Westwood, 1847
- Bombyx incomposita van Eecke, 1929
- Bombyx lemeepauli Lemée, 1950
- Bombyx mandarina (Moore, 1872) – wild silk moth
- Bombyx mori (Linnaeus, 1758) – domestic silk moth
- Bombyx rotundapex Miyata & Kishida, 1990
- Bombyx shini Park and Sohn, 2002

== Hybrids ==
Two instances of semi-natural hybridisation are known within this genus:

- Bombyx hybrid, a hybrid between a male B. mandarina and a female B. mori
- Bombyx second hybrid, a hybrid between a male B. mori and a female B. mandarina

== Food ==
The caterpillars feed on Moraceae, especially on mulberries (Morus species). Domestic silkworms may be fed artificial mulberry chow.
