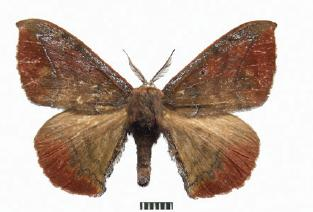

Scientific classification
- Kingdom: Animalia
- Phylum: Arthropoda
- Class: Insecta
- Order: Lepidoptera
- Family: Endromidae
- Genus: Andraca
- Species: A. bipunctata

Binomial name
- Andraca bipunctata Walker, 1865

Synonyms
- Andraca angulata Kishida, 1993

= Andraca bipunctata =

Species of moth

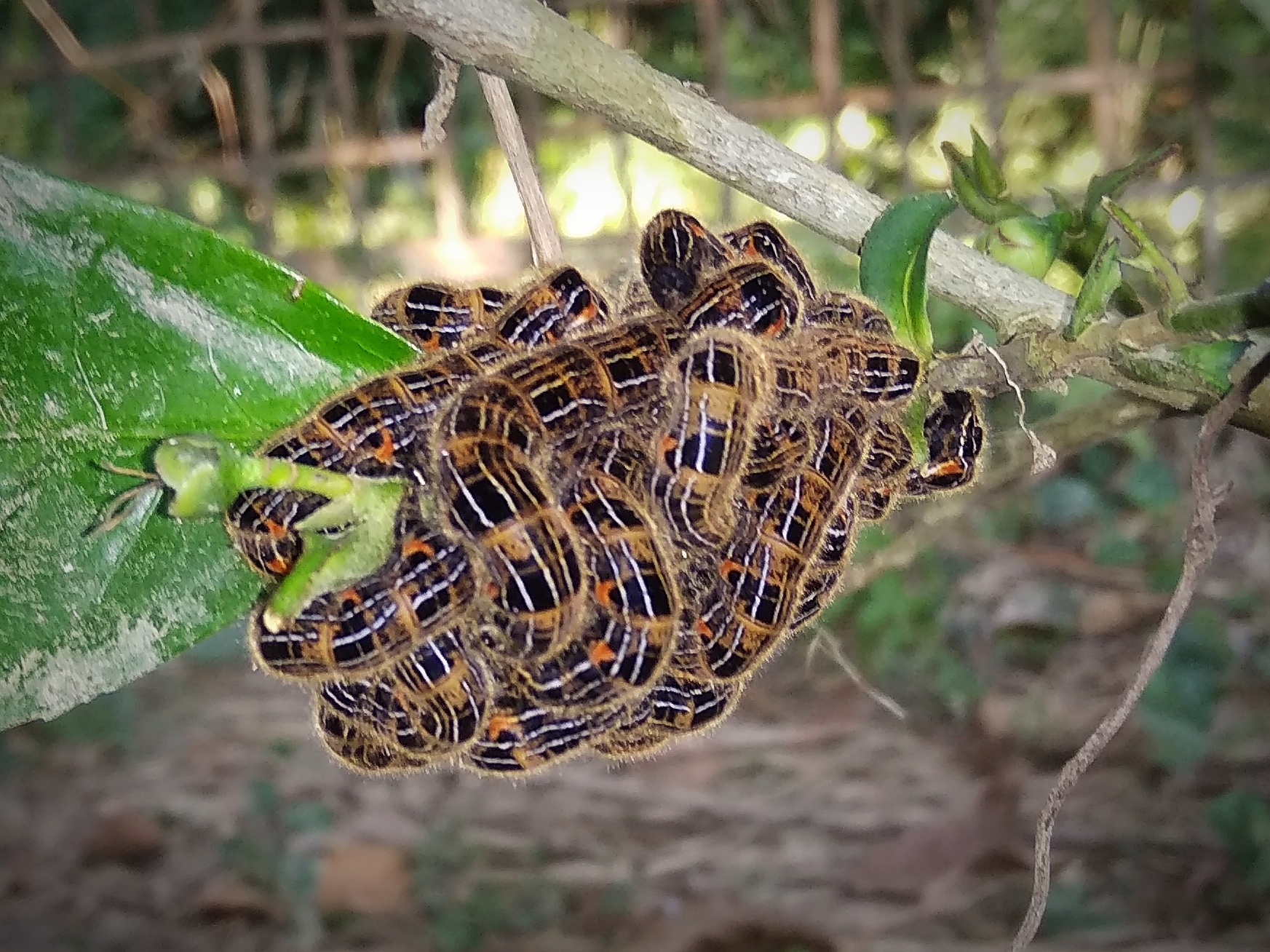
larva

Andraca bipunctata is a moth of the family Endromidae. It is found in China (Yunnan), India (Sikkim, Darjeeling, Meghalaya), Bhutan, northern Thailand, Myanmar and Nepal. The larvae are referred to as bunch caterpillars.

The wingspan is 42–45 mm. Adults are rather variable in coloration and size. Adults have been recorded from March to April, May to June, July to August and October to November.

The larvae feed on Camellia sinensis, Camellia assamica and Camellia oleifera and are a well-known serious pests of tea trees. They feed on the young leaves and remove the epidermis. Larvae can be found from March to April, May to June, July to August and October to November.
