= Rondotia =

Scientific classification
- Kingdom: Animalia
- Phylum: Arthropoda
- Class: Insecta
- Order: Lepidoptera
- Family: Bombycidae
- Subfamily: Bombycinae
- Genus: Rondotia; Moore, 1885

Type species
- Rondotia menciana Moore, 1885

Synonyms
- Ectrocta Hampson, [1893]

Genus of moths

Rondotia is a genus of moths of the family Bombycidae erected by Frederic Moore in 1885.

== Selected species ==
- Rondotia diaphana (Hampson, [1893])
- Rondotia lineata Leech, 1898
- Rondotia melanoleuca Cao & Liu, 2024
- Rondotia menciana Moore, 1885
