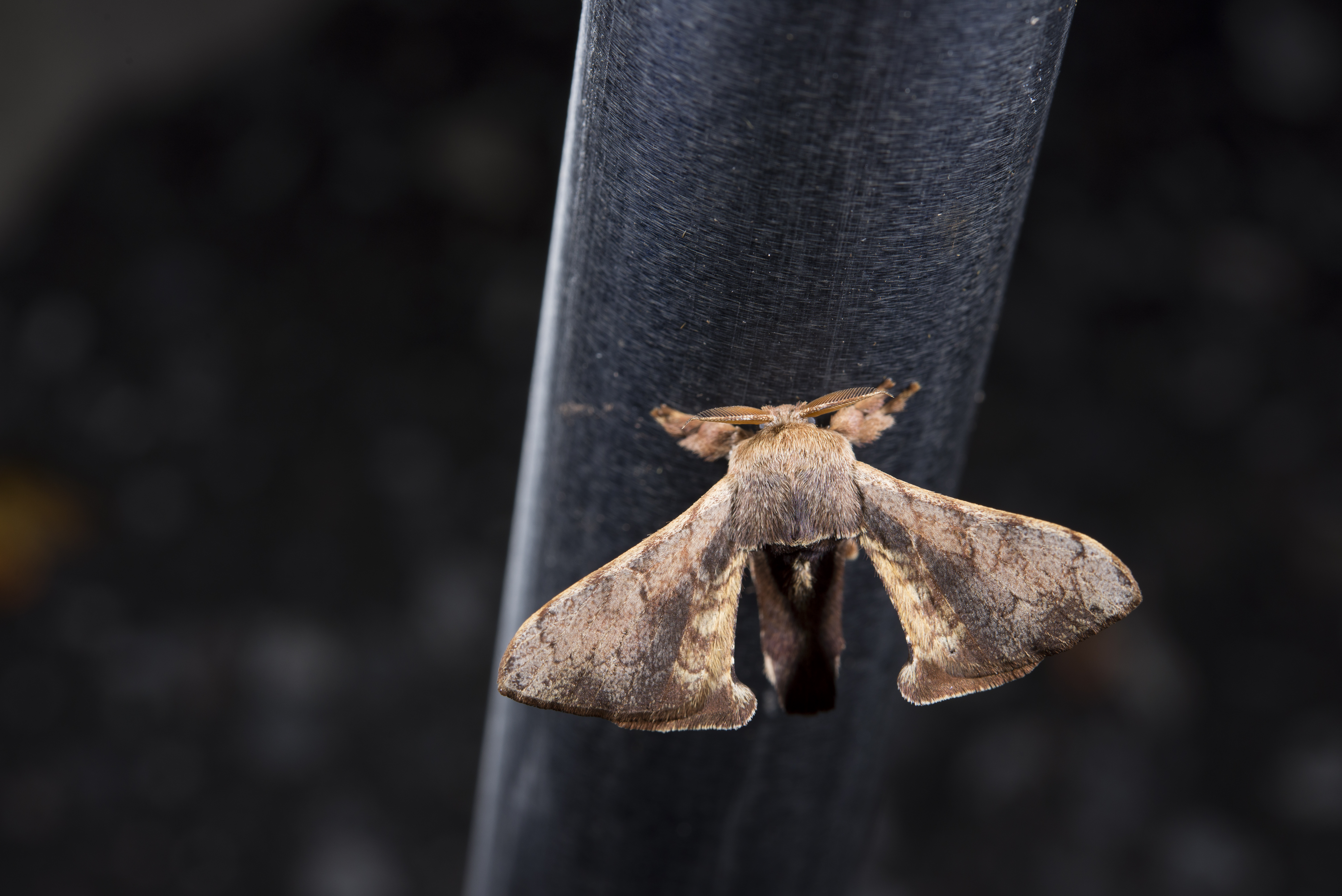

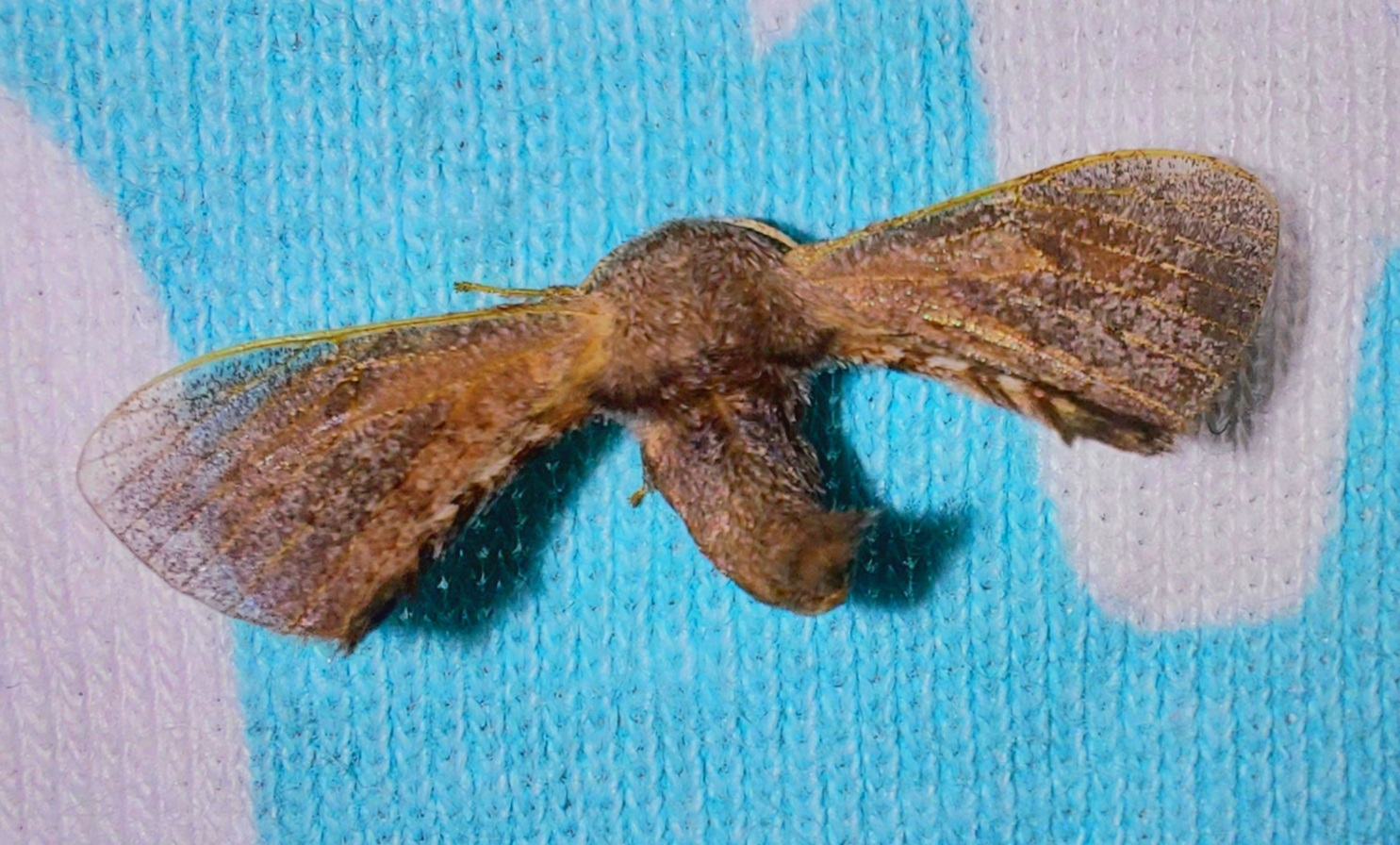

Scientific classification
- Kingdom: Animalia
- Phylum: Arthropoda
- Class: Insecta
- Order: Lepidoptera
- Family: Bombycidae
- Genus: Trilocha
- Species: T. varians

Binomial name
- Trilocha varians (Walker, 1855)

Synonyms
- Naprepa varians Walker, 1855; Chazena velata Walker, 1869

= Trilocha varians =

Species of moth

Trilocha varians, the Greenish silk-moth is a moth in the family Bombycidae described by Francis Walker in 1855. It is widespread in the Oriental region from India, Sri Lanka, China, extending to Taiwan, the Philippines, Pakistan, Sulawesi and Java.

== Description ==
The wingspan is 25–27 mm. There are two colour varieties in the species; albicollis is the greyish form and varians is the reddish form.

Head, thorax and abdomen of males are pale or dark reddish brown. Forewings are pale reddish brown or greyish, with two antemedial curved waved lines. There is a dark patch on the outer margin below the apex. The costal edge is paler with cilia being dark reddish brown. Hindwings are pale or dark reddish brown or with greyish with outer reddish brown area. The postmedial line is indistinct. Ventral surface is paler with some dark red stripes.

Larvae are elongated and brown with dark dots and a lateral row of black spots. There is a slight protuberance on each of the thoracic and 5th, 8th somites. A long slender horn can be seen on anal somite. The larvae feed on Streblus and Ficus species. A silken cocoon is oval and pale.

== Subspecies ==
- Trilocha varians varians
- Trilocha varians lineata Dierl, 1978 (Philippines)
