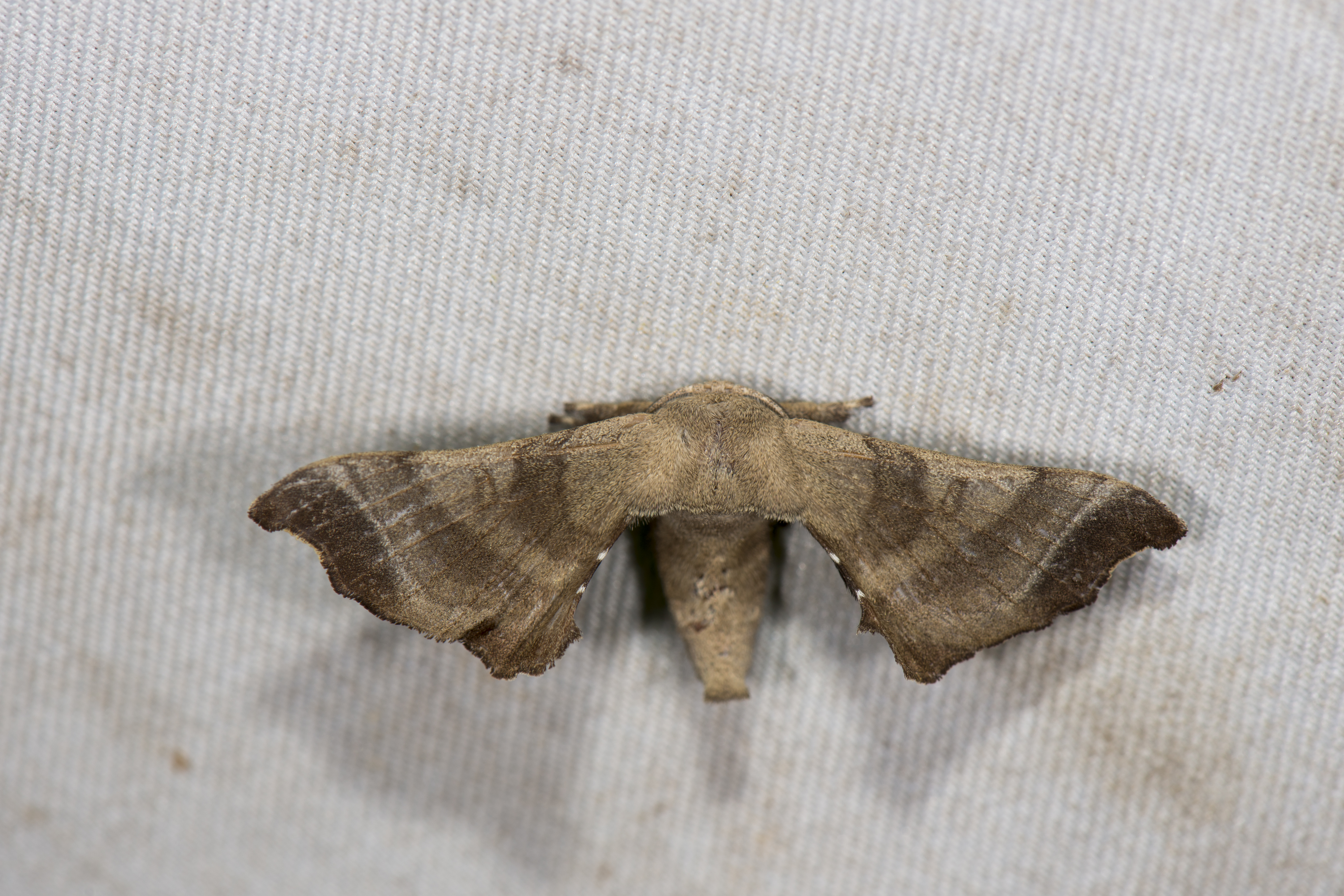

Scientific classification
- Kingdom: Animalia
- Phylum: Arthropoda
- Clade: Pancrustacea
- Class: Insecta
- Order: Lepidoptera
- Family: Bombycidae
- Genus: Bombyx
- Species: B. mandarina

Binomial name
- Bombyx mandarina (Moore, 1872)

Synonyms
- Bombyx mori mandarina (Moore, 1872); Theophila mandarina Moore, 1872

= Bombyx mandarina =

Wild silk moth

Species of moth

Bombyx mandarina, the wild silk moth, is a species of moth in the family Bombycidae. It is the closest relative of Bombyx mori, the domesticated silk moth. The larvae (caterpillars) of both species are called silkworms, famous for producing the fibroinous cocoon that is harvested by humans for silk.

Unlike its domesticated relative, who has lost the ability to fly and is too synanthropic to even survive outside human cultivation, B. mandarina is a fairly ordinary moth. The main difference between the wild B. mandarina and the domesticated B. mori is that the former has a more slender body with well-developed wings in males, and is dull greyish-brown in colour.

== Phylogeny and systematics ==
Bombyx mandarina and the domesticated Bombyx mori constitute two of the currently identified eight species of the genus Bombyx, the true or mulberry silk moths. The origin of the domestic silk moth is enigmatic. It has been suggested that it is the survivor of an extinct species that diverged from the ancestors of Bombyx mandarina millions of years ago. However, this is based on an untenable molecular clock hypothesis that assumes that wild and domestic silk moths evolved equally fast after their lineages diverged. Rather, the effects of artificial selection have accelerated evolution in the domestic form to a point where it is hard to trace the origin of the numerous breeds of domestic silk moths even with the most modern molecular phylogeny methods. Conceivably, today's domestic silk moths are all descended from an initial stock of B. mandarina collected as far back as 5,000 years ago. While wild silk could have been collected and used as threads, etc., since much earlier, the technology to breed and use silkworms from a domesticated stock did not exist before the late Neolithic.

However, it has been possible to trace the geographical origin of the domestic silk moth. The wild species occurs over a considerable range from inland China to Korea and Japan, and shows much (albeit subtle) variation; Chinese specimens have 56 chromosomes and Japanese specimens have 54. The populations from the northeastern end of the range, for example, differ in karyotype from those of inland China. Domestic silk moths are closer to the latter regarding mtDNA sequence data, and especially lack some genetic apomorphies of the northeastern B. mandarina. Thus, the initial domestic stock came from inland China.

B. mandarina is able to hybridize with B. mori. Both in the wild and a domesticated environment, females release pheromones and wait for males to be attracted and fly to them. However, B. mori males cannot fly. Hybridisation in the wild, therefore, inevitably means breeding between wild (B. mandarina) males and domestic (B. mori) females. Hybridization is possible in both directions in a domesticated environment.

Consequently, the two silk moths have been united as subspecies of a single species; in this case, the name Bombyx mori, which was published first, applies to both. However, today it is usually recognized that the domestic silk moth is entirely dependent on human care for its survival and thus has a level of reproductive isolation from its wild relatives.
