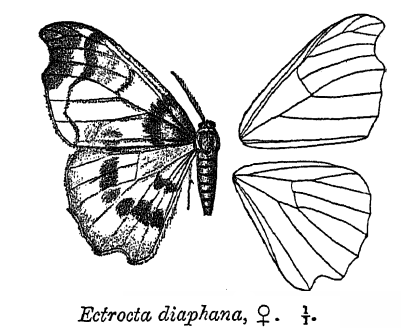

Scientific classification
- Domain: Eukaryota
- Kingdom: Animalia
- Phylum: Arthropoda
- Class: Insecta
- Order: Lepidoptera
- Family: Bombycidae
- Genus: Rondotia
- Species: R. diaphana

Binomial name
- Rondotia diaphana (Hampson, [1893])

Synonyms
- Ectrocta diaphana Hampson, [1893]

= Rondotia diaphana =

Species of moth

Rondotia diaphana is a moth in the family Bombycidae. It was described by George Hampson in 1893. It is found in China, Myanmar, India and Vietnam.
