= Gunda thwaitesii =

Scientific classification
- Domain: Eukaryota
- Kingdom: Animalia
- Phylum: Arthropoda
- Class: Insecta
- Order: Lepidoptera
- Family: Bombycidae
- Genus: Gunda
- Species: G. thwaitesii

Binomial name
- Gunda thwaitesii (Moore, 1883)

Synonyms
- Dasychira thwaitesii Moore, 1883; Gunda apicalis Hampson, 1892

Species of moth

Gunda thwaitesii is a species of moth in the family Bombycidae. It was described by Frederic Moore in 1883 and is found in Sri Lanka.

Adult is about 62 mm in length. The female is yellowish brown. The antennae are ochreous. There is a pale streak on the vertex of abdomen. Forewings with outer line less angled. There is a dark apical patch.
