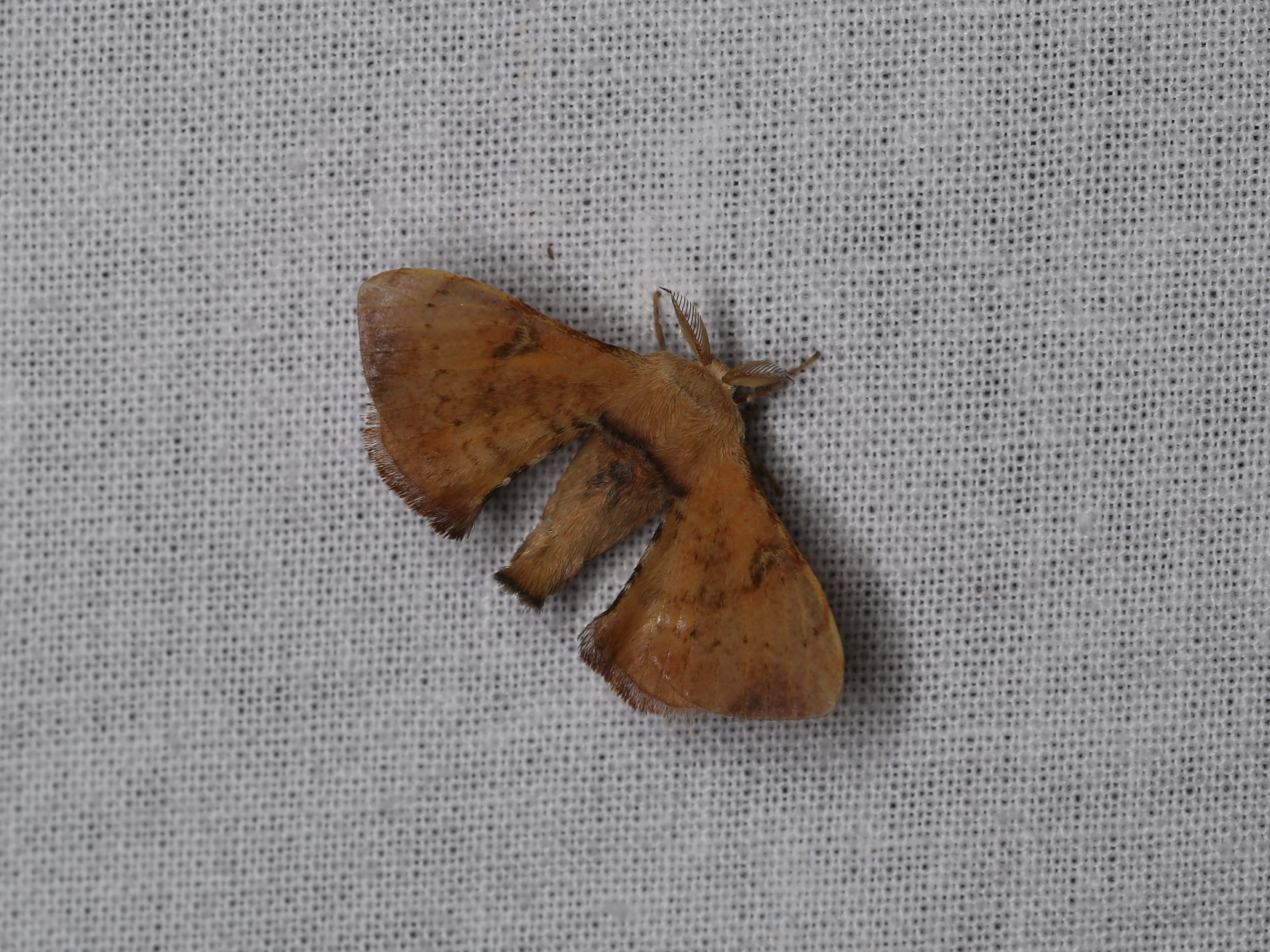
- Trilocha varians

Scientific classification
- Kingdom: Animalia
- Phylum: Arthropoda
- Class: Insecta
- Order: Lepidoptera
- Family: Bombycidae
- Subfamily: Bombycinae
- Genus: Trilocha; Moore, [1860]

Type species
- Naprepa varians Walker, 1855

Synonyms
- Naprepa Walker, 1855; Chazena Walker, 1869

= Trilocha =

Genus of moths

Trilocha is a genus of moths of the family Bombycidae first described by Frederic Moore in 1855. It is sometimes treated as a synonym of Ocinara.

== Selected species ==
- Trilocha annae (Thiaucourt, 1997)
- Trilocha arabica (Wiltshire, 1982)
- Trilocha friedeli Dierl, 1978
- Trilocha guianensis (Thiaucourt, 2009)
- Trilocha myodes West, 1932
- Trilocha pallescens Schaus, 1921
- Trilocha pulcherioides (Thiaucourt, 2009)
- Trilocha varians (Walker, 1855)

== Former species ==
- Trilocha sinica Dierl, 1979
