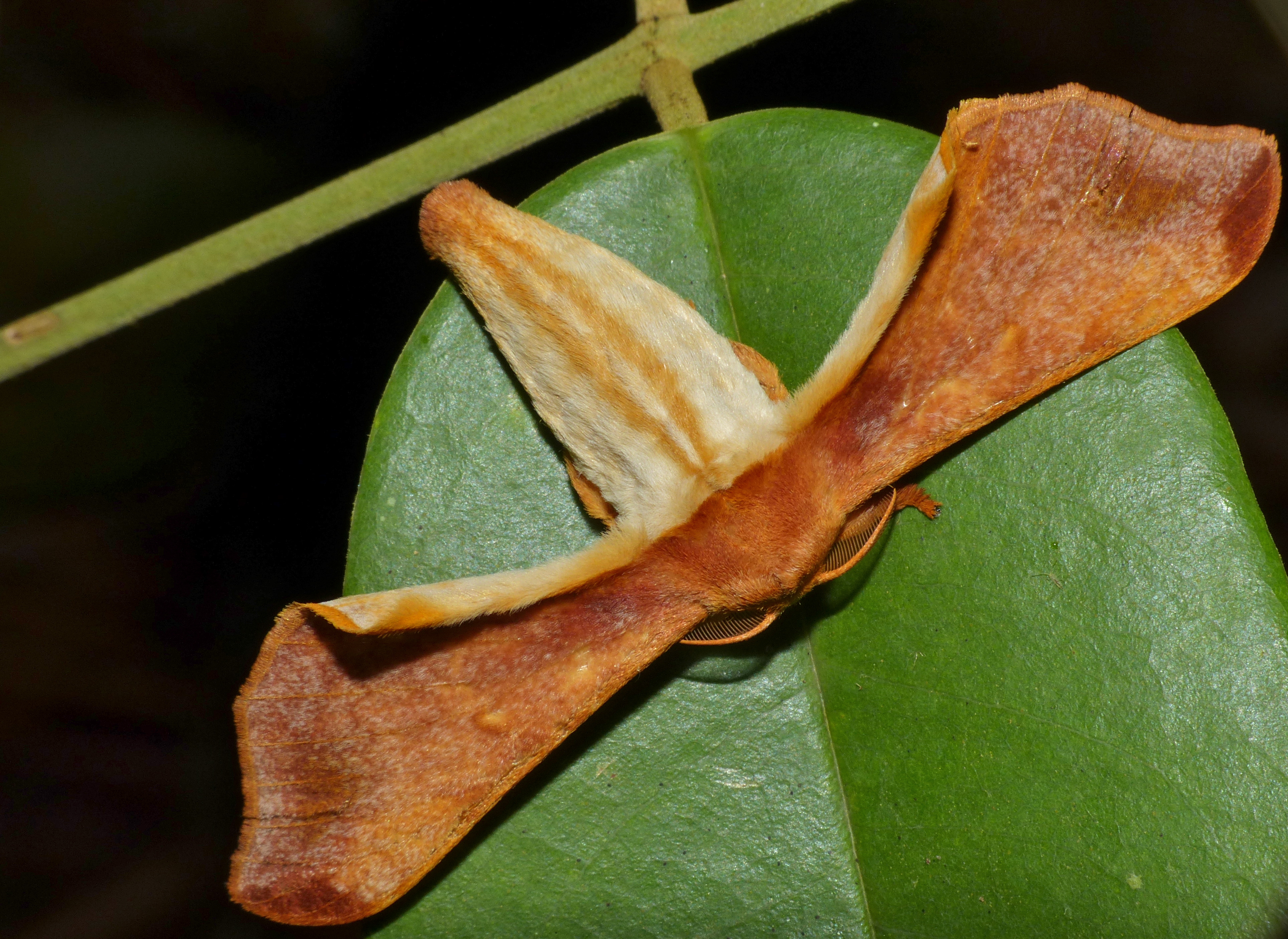

Scientific classification
- Kingdom: Animalia
- Phylum: Arthropoda
- Class: Insecta
- Order: Lepidoptera
- Family: Bombycidae
- Genus: Gunda
- Species: G. ochracea

Binomial name
- Gunda ochracea Walker, 1862

Synonyms
- Aristhala hainana Moore 1878; Aristhala sikkima Moore, 1878; Norasuma variegata Hampson, 1893; Gunda leefmansi Roepke, 1924

= Gunda ochracea =

Species of moth

Gunda ochracea is a species of moth in the family Bombycidae. It was described by Francis Walker in 1862. It is found in the Indian subregion and from South-east Asia to Sumatra, Borneo and the Philippines. The habitat consists of various lowland forest types.

== Description ==
Male has reddish-brown head, thorax and abdomen which is grizzled with grey. Forewings are ochreous brown much suffused with reddish brown at inner and outer areas. Two dark spots can be seen near the base. Hindwings are reddish brown, ochreous towards anal angle and outer margin. There are two indistinct waved lines, where the inner area is dark reddish brown, suffused with grey. Ventral side of hindwings with two dark specks in the cell and lines are more distinct.

Female is yellow. Thorax is suffused with reddish brown. Colour of the forewings is reddish brown near inner and outer margins. Hindwings are suffused with reddish brown at base.
