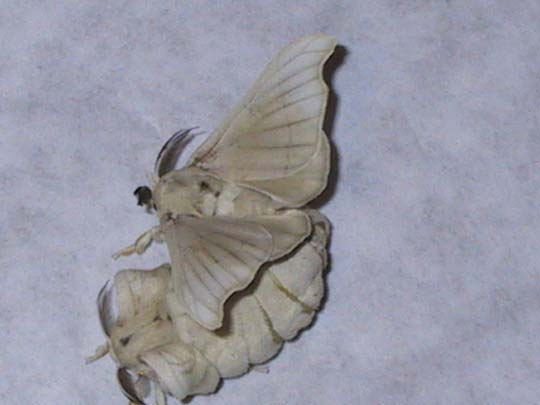
- Paired male (above) and female (below)
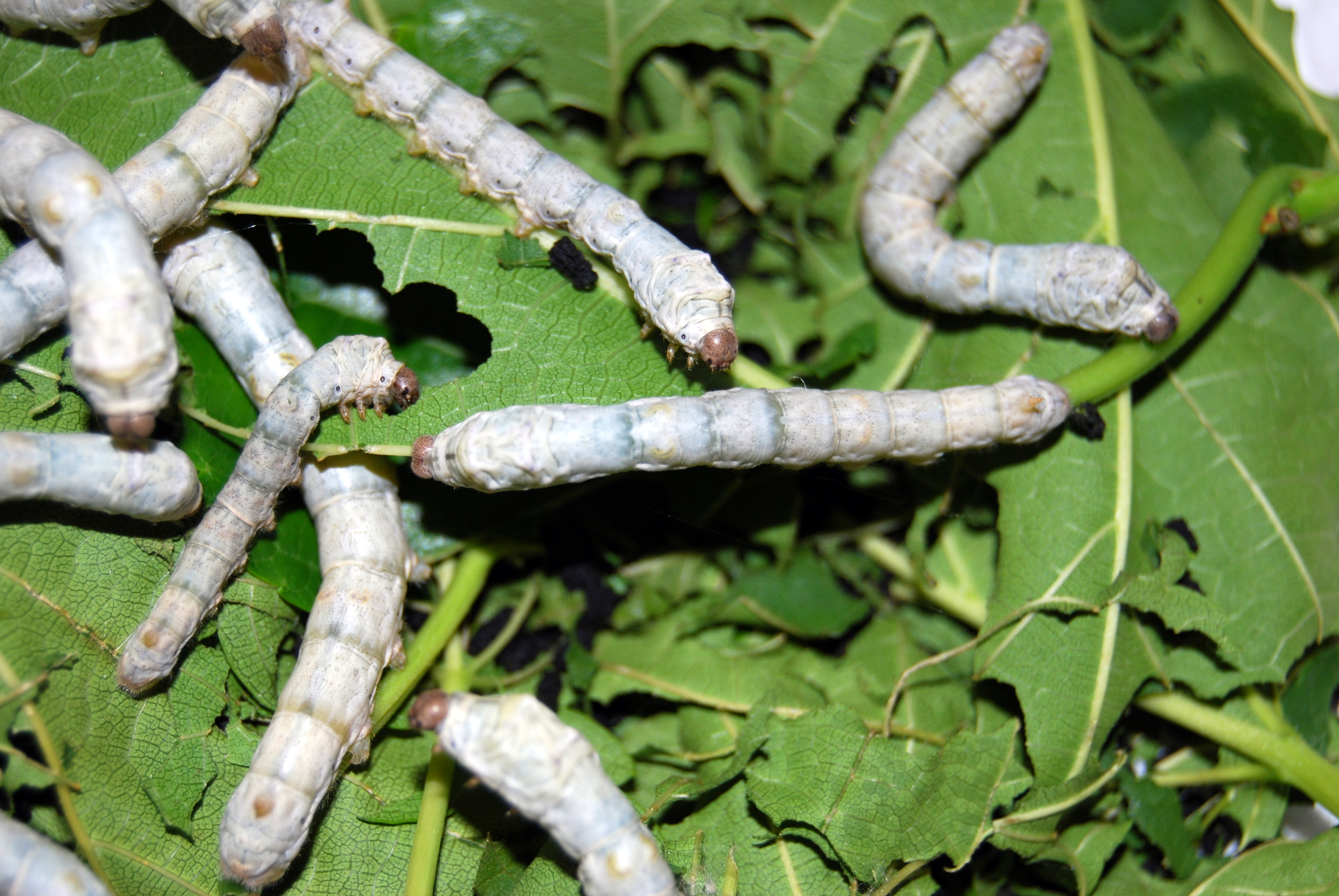
- Fourth instar

Conservation status
- Domesticated

Scientific classification
- Kingdom: Animalia
- Phylum: Arthropoda
- Clade: Pancrustacea
- Class: Insecta
- Order: Lepidoptera
- Family: Bombycidae
- Genus: Bombyx
- Species: B. mori

Binomial name
- Bombyx mori (Linnaeus, 1758)

Synonyms
- Phalaena mori Linnaeus, 1758; Bombyx arracanensis Moore & Hutton, 1862; Bombyx brunnea Grünberg, 1911; Bombyx croesi Moore & Hutton, 1862; Bombyx fortunatus Moore & Hutton, 1862; Bombyx meridionalis Wood-Mason, 1886; Bombyx sinensis Moore & Hutton, 1862; Bombyx textor Moore & Hutton, 1862

= Bombyx mori =

Moth mainly used in the production of silk

Bombyx mori, commonly known as the domestic silk moth, is a domesticated moth species belonging to the family Bombycidae. It is the closest relative of Bombyx mandarina, the wild silk moth. Silkworms are the larvae of silk moths. The silkworm is of particular economic value, being a primary producer of silk. The silkworm's preferred food are the leaves of white mulberry, though they may eat other species of mulberry, and even leaves of other plants. Domestic silk moths are entirely dependent on humans for reproduction, as a result of millennia of selective breeding. Wild silk moths, which are other species of Bombyx, are not as commercially viable in the production of silk.

Sericulture, the practice of breeding silk moths for the production of raw silk, has existed for at least 5,000 years in China, whence it spread to India, Korea, Nepal, Japan, and then the West. The conventional process of sericulture kills the silkworm in the pupal stage. The domestic silk moth was domesticated from the wild silk moth Bombyx mandarina, which has a range from northern India to northern China, Korea, Japan, and the far eastern regions of Russia. The domestic silk moth derives from Chinese rather than Japanese or Korean stock.

Silk moths were unlikely to have been domestically bred before the Neolithic period. Before then, the tools to manufacture quantities of silk thread had not been developed. The domesticated Bombyx mori and the wild Bombyx mandarina can still breed and sometimes produce hybrids. It is unknown if B. mori can hybridize with other Bombyx species. Compared to most members in the genus Bombyx, domestic silk moths have lost their coloration as well as their ability to fly.

== Types ==
Mulberry silk moths can be divided into three major categories based on seasonal brood frequency. Univoltine silk moths produce only one brood a season, and they are generally found in and around Europe. Univoltine eggs must hibernate through the winter, ultimately cross-fertilizing in spring. Bivoltine varieties are normally found in East Asia, and their accelerated breeding process is made possible by warmer climates. In addition, there are polyvoltine silk moths found only in the tropics. Their eggs typically hatch within 9 to 12 days, meaning there can be up to eight generations of larvae throughout the year. Mulberry silkworms are highly sensitive to environmental variables, and diapause - a physiological arrest in development - can be significantly influenced by photoperiod, temperature and humidity. Recent studies have reported the occurrence of non-diapause eggs in bivoltine races, indicating a more flexible diapause expression than previously understood.

== Description and life cycle ==
=== Larvae (silkworms) ===
Eggs take about 14 days to hatch into larvae. Larvae have a preference for white mulberry, having an attraction to the mulberry odorant cis-jasmone. There are five instars before pupation.

The silkworm is essentially monophagous, exclusively eating mulberry leaves (Morus spp.). By developing techniques for using artificial diets, the amino acids needed for development are known.

=== Pupae (cocoon) ===
After they have molted four times, their bodies become slightly yellow, and the skin becomes tighter. The larvae then prepare to enter the pupal phase of their life cycle, and enclose themselves in a cocoon made up of raw silk produced by the salivary glands. The final molt from larva to pupa takes place within the cocoon, which provides a layer of protection during the vulnerable, almost motionless pupal state. Many other Lepidoptera produce cocoons, but only a few — the Bombycidae, in particular the genus Bombyx, and the Saturniidae, in particular the genus Antheraea — have been exploited for fabric production.

The cocoon is made of a thread of raw silk from 300 to about 900 metres (1,000 to about 3,000 ft) long. The fibers are fine and lustrous, about 10 μm in diameter. The number of cocoons required to produce a final yield of silk is approximately 4,000–7,000 per kilogram (2,000–3,000/lb); at least 32 million kilograms (70 million pounds) of raw silk are produced each year, requiring nearly 10 billion cocoons.

If the animal survives through the pupal phase of its life cycle, it releases proteolytic enzymes to make a hole in the cocoon so it can emerge as an adult moth. These enzymes are destructive to the silk and can cause the silk fibers to break down from over a mile in length to segments of random length, which reduces the value of the silk threads, although these damaged silk cocoons are still used as "stuffing" available in China and elsewhere in the production of duvets, jackets, and other purposes. To prevent this, silkworm cocoons are boiled in water. The heat kills the silkworms, and the water makes the cocoons easier to unravel. Often, the silkworm is eaten.

As the process of harvesting the silk from the cocoon kills the pupa, sericulture has been criticized by animal welfare and rights activists. Mahatma Gandhi was critical of silk production based on the ahimsa philosophy "not to hurt any living thing". This led to Gandhi's promotion of cotton spinning machines, an example of which can be seen at the Gandhi Institute, and an extension of this principle has led to the modern production practice known as Ahimsa silk, which is wild silk (from wild and semiwild silk moths) made from the cocoons of moths that are allowed to emerge before the silk is harvested.

=== Moth ===
The moth is the adult phase of the silk worm's life cycle. Silk moths have a wingspan of 3–5 cm (1–2 in) and a white, hairy body. Females are about two to three times bulkier than males (due to carrying many eggs). All adult Bombycidae moths have reduced mouthparts and do not feed.

The wings of the silk moth develop from larval imaginal disks. The moth is not capable of functional flight, in contrast to the wild B. mandarina and other Bombyx species, whose males fly to meet females. Some may emerge with the ability to lift off and stay airborne, but sustained flight cannot be achieved as their bodies are too big and heavy for their small wings.

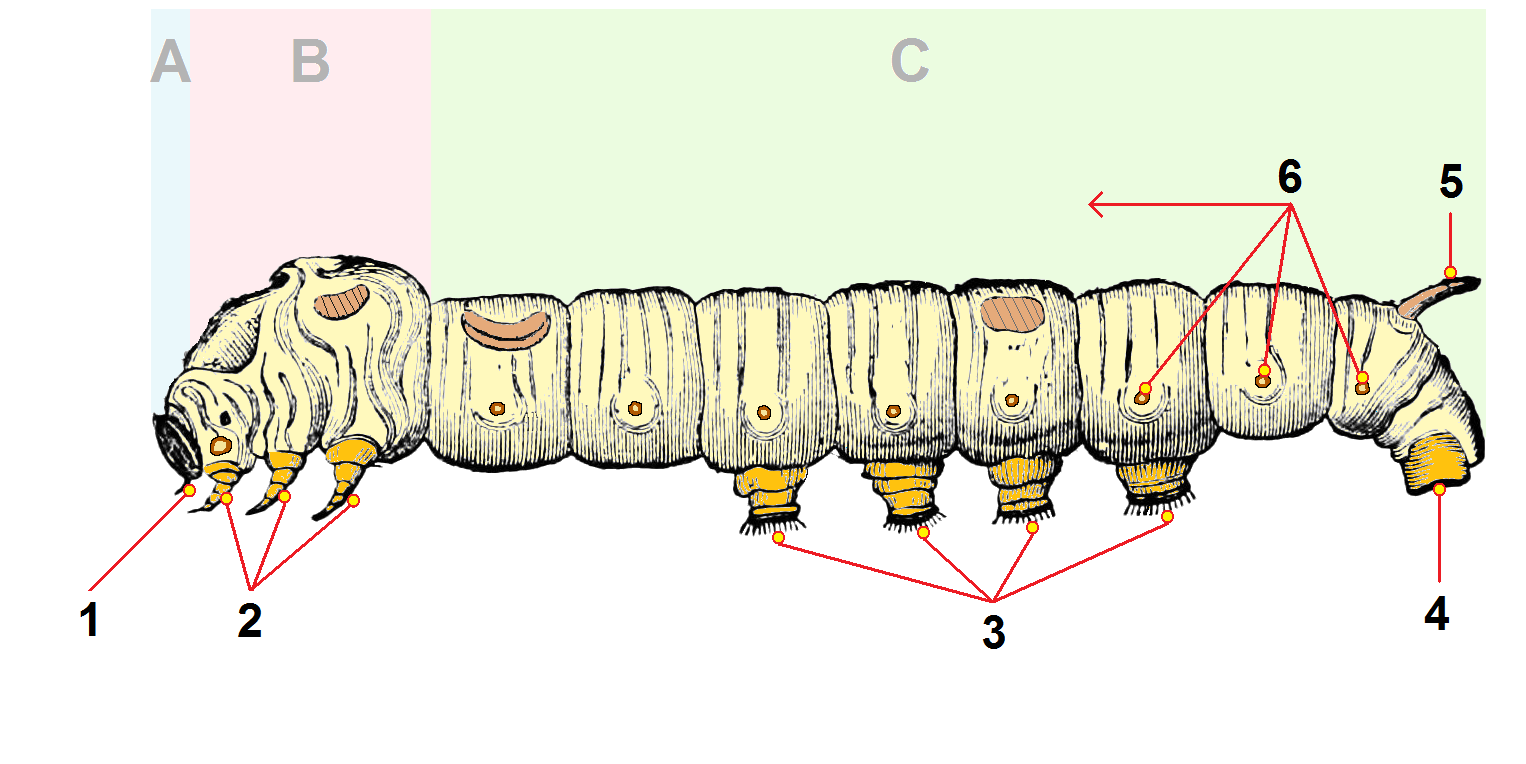
2- thoracic legs

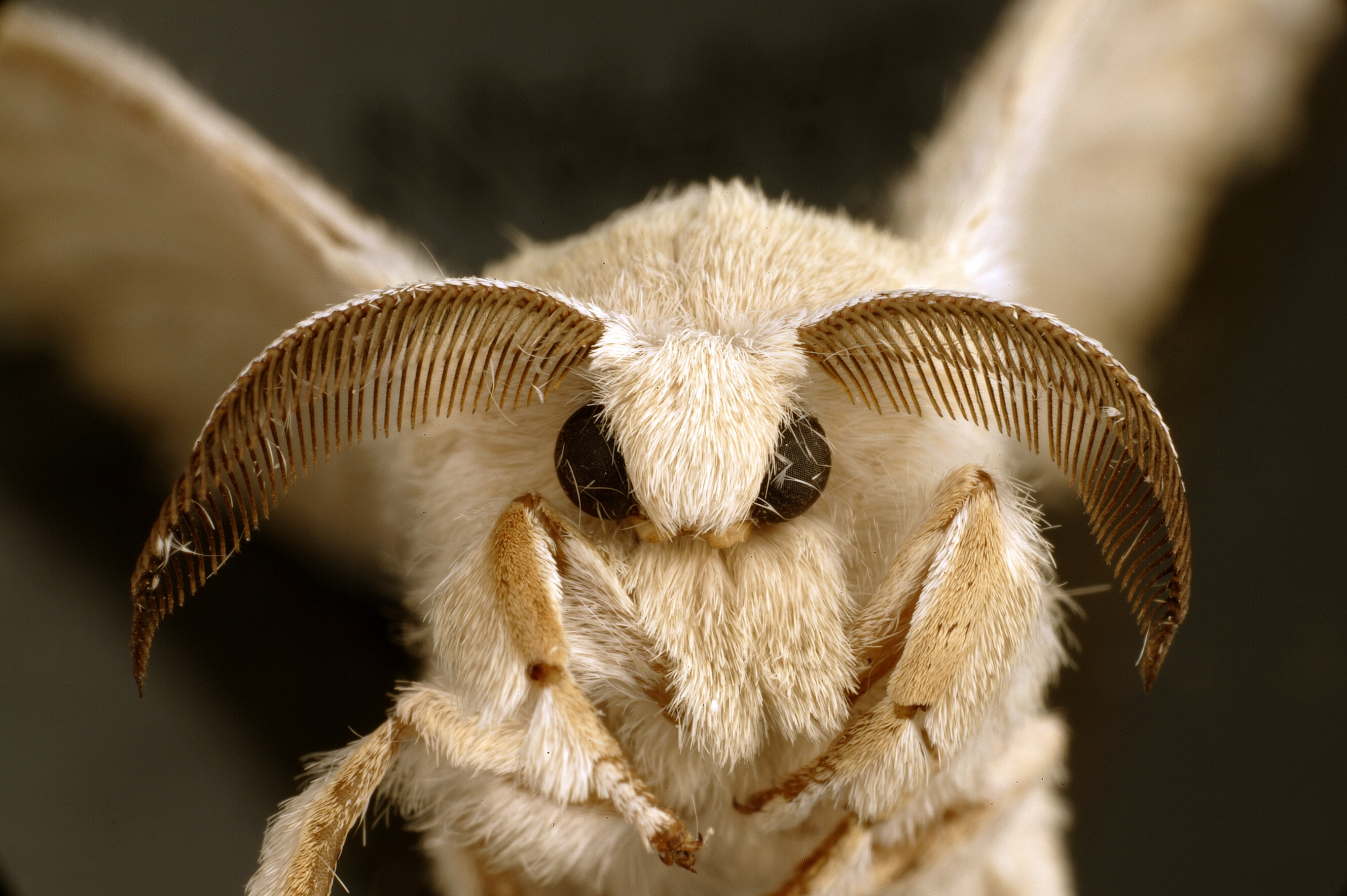
Adult silk moth

The legs of the silk moth develop from the silkworm's larval (thoracic) legs. Developmental genes like Distalless and extradenticle have been used to mark leg development. In addition, removing specific segments of the thoracic legs at different ages of the larva resulted in the adult silk moth not developing the corresponding adult leg segments.

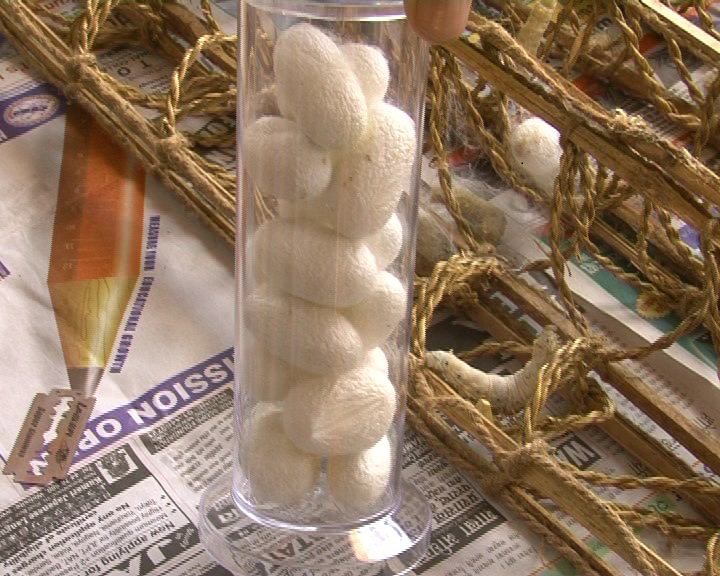
Cocoon of B. mori

=== Genome ===
The full genome of the domestic silk moth was published in 2008 by the International Silkworm Genome Consortium. Draft sequences were published in 2004.

The genome of the domestic silk moth is mid-range with a genome size around 432 million base pairs. A notable feature is that 43.6% of the genome are repetitive sequences, most of which are transposable elements. At least 3,000 silkworm genes are unique, and have no homologous equivalents in other genomes. The silkworm's ability to produce large amounts of silk correlates with the presence of specific tRNA clusters, as well as some clustered sericin genes. Additionally, the silkworm's ability to consume toxic mulberry leaves is linked to specialized sucrase genes, which appear to have been acquired from bacterial genes.

In 2018, Illumina's short reads for 137 strain genomes were published. In 2022, Nanopore's long reads for 545 strain genomes were published.

== Interaction with humans ==
=== Domestication ===
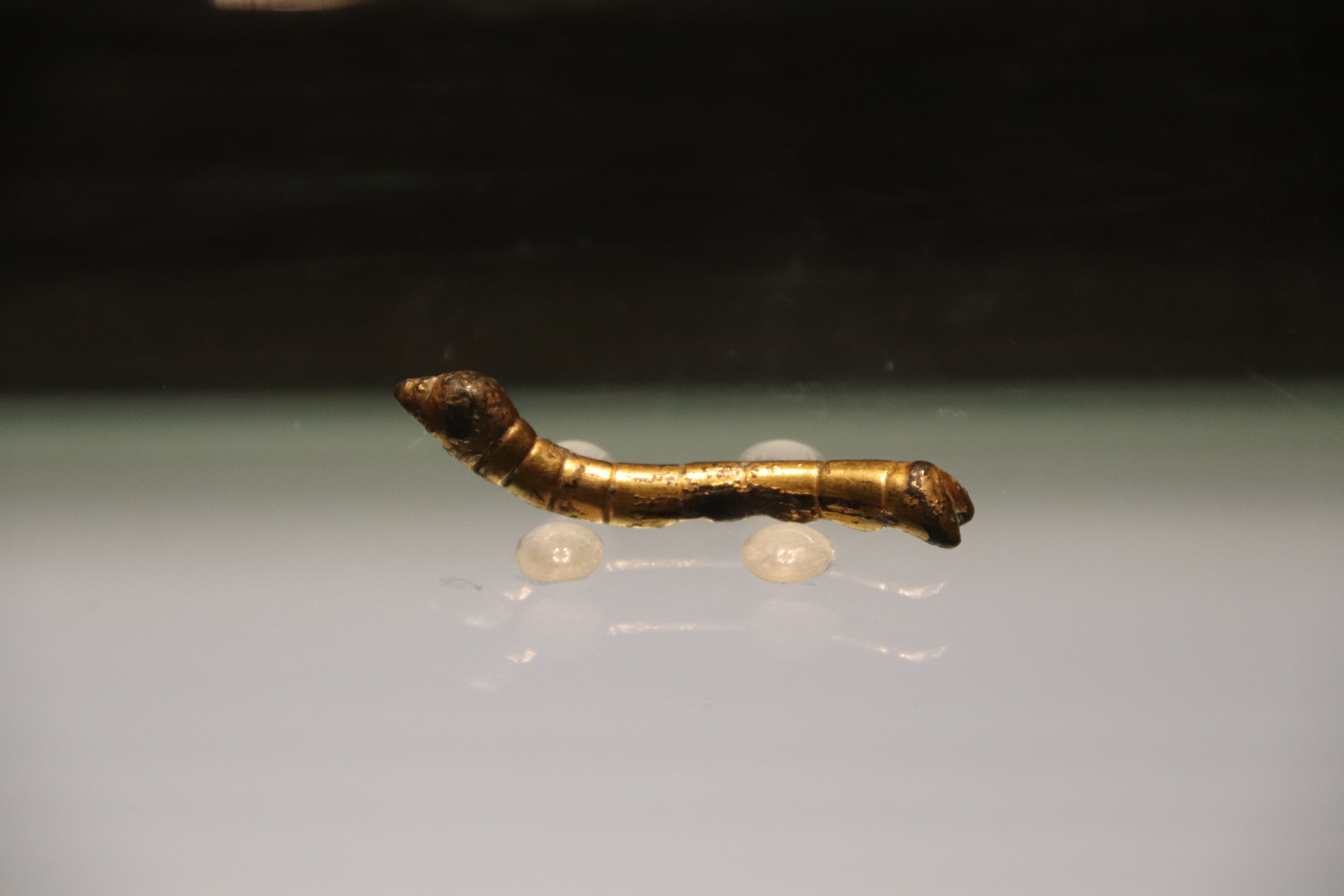
Gold silkworm, Han dynasty

The domestic species B. mori, compared to the wild species (e.g., B. mandarina), has increased cocoon size, body size, growth rate, and efficiency of its digestion. It has gained tolerance to human presence and handling, and also to living in crowded conditions. The domestic silk moths cannot fly, so the males need human assistance in finding a mate, and it lacks fear of potential predators. The native color pigments have also been lost, so the domestic silk moths are leucistic, since camouflage is not useful when they only live in captivity. These changes have made B. mori entirely dependent upon humans for survival, and it does not exist in the wild. The eggs are kept in incubators to aid in their hatching.

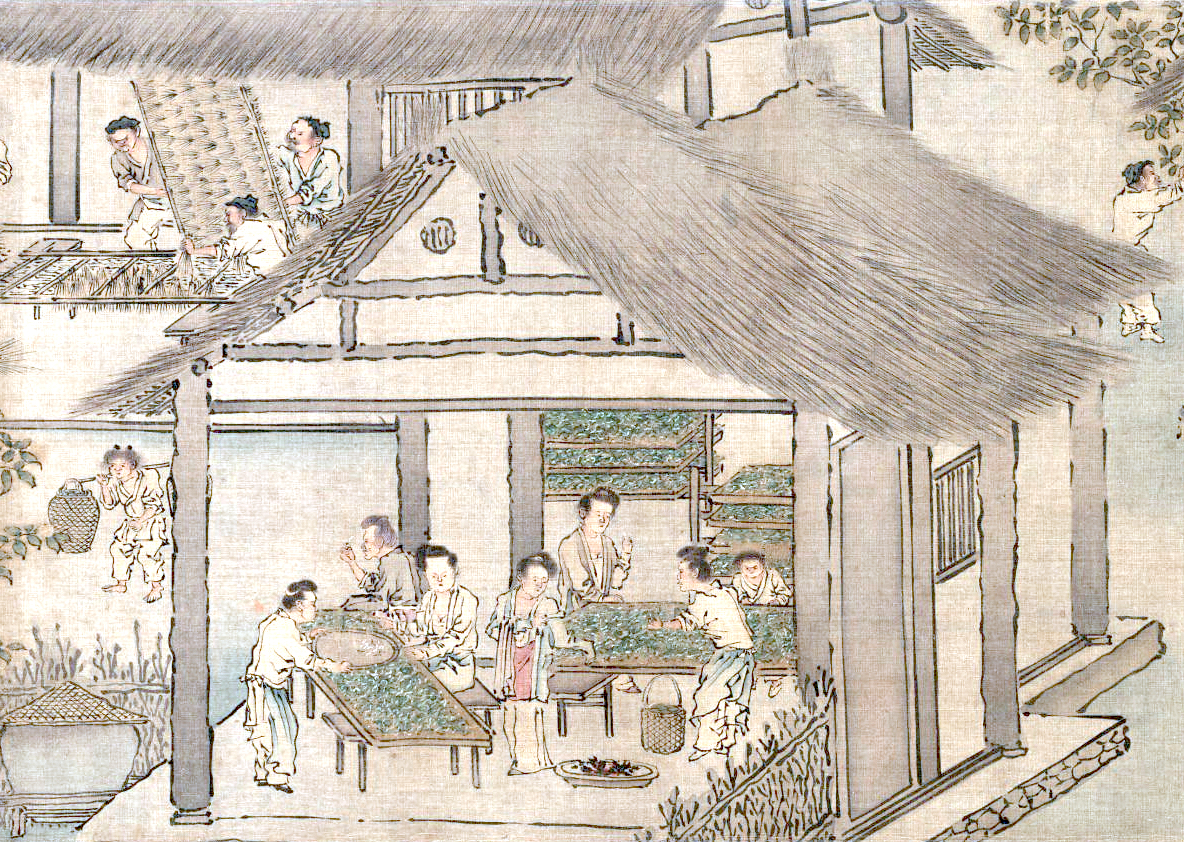
Silkworms and mulberry leaves placed on trays (Liang Kai's Sericulture c. 13th century)

The earliest archaeological evidence for silk moth domestication is associated with the Yangshao culture of northern China, dating to more than 5,000 years ago. The Chinese also domesticated the common carp over 5,000 years ago. Carp were often raised in ponds on silk farms and were fed silk moth larvae and faeces. This allowed sericulture and aquaculture to be practiced in conjunction.

=== Economic value ===
Silk is a valuable product, representing under 0.2% of the world's production of fibre but with a market value predicted to be $18.1 billion in 2027. Production is labour-intensive as it takes over 100 kg of mulberry leaves to produce 1 kg of raw silk. 70% of the world's silk is produced in China.

=== Breeding ===
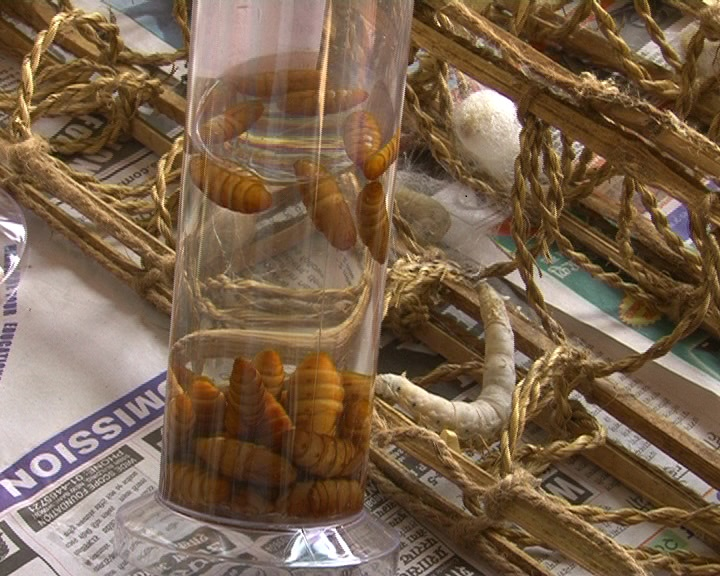
Pupae

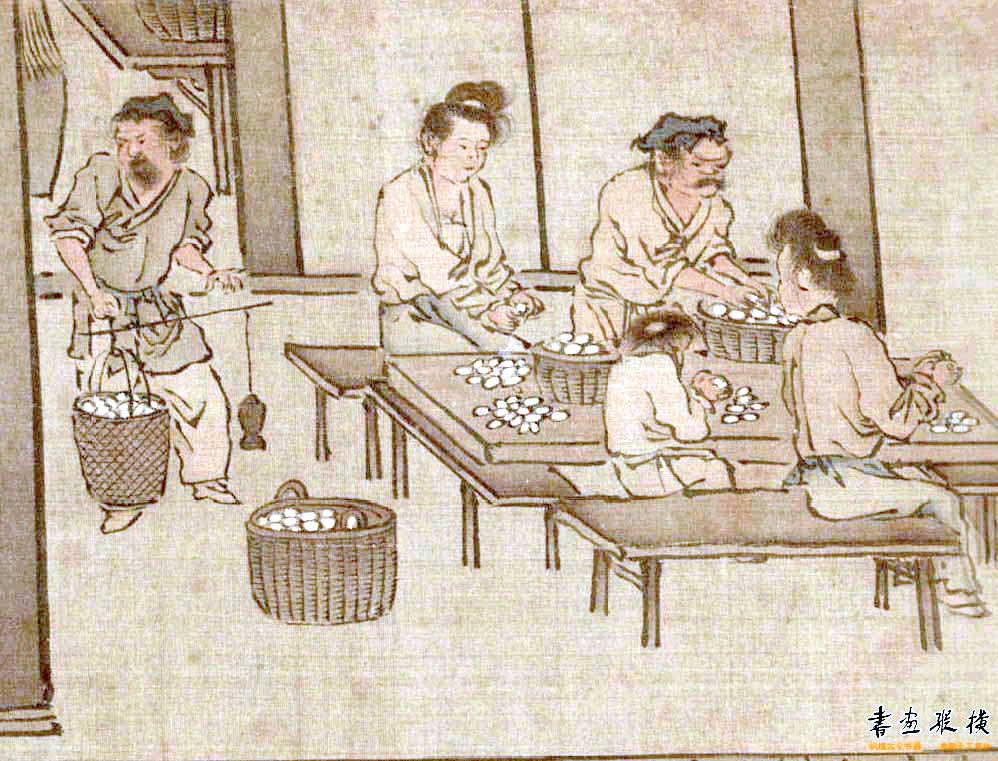
Silkworm cocoons weighed and sorted (Liang Kai's Sericulture)

Silk moth breeding is aimed at the overall improvement of silkworms from a commercial point of view. The major objectives are improving fecundity, the health of larvae, quantity of cocoon and silk production, and disease resistance. Healthy larvae lead to a healthy cocoon crop. Health is dependent on factors such as better pupation rate, fewer dead larvae in the mountage, shorter larval duration (this lessens the chance of infection) and bluish-tinged fifth-instar larvae (which are healthier than the reddish-brown ones). Quantity of cocoon and silk produced are directly related to the pupation rate and larval weight. Healthier larvae have greater pupation rates and cocoon weights. Quality of cocoon and silk depends on a number of factors, including genetics.

In the U.S., teachers sometimes introduce the insect life cycle to their students by raising domestic silk moths in the classroom as a science project. Students have a chance to observe complete life cycles of insects from eggs to larvae to pupae to moths. Other than the U.S., this domestic silk moth is utilized in educational settings in several countries, including China, South Africa, Zimbabwe, Iran, and Taiwan.

=== Research ===
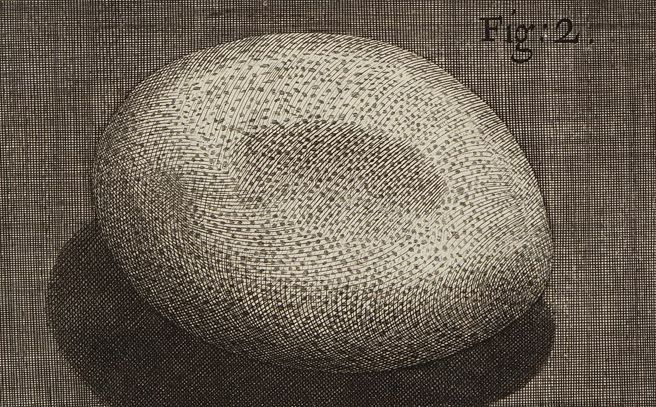
A study of an egg of a silkworm from Hooke's Micrographia, 1665

1679 study of the silkworm metamorphosis by Maria Sibylla Merian, it depicts the fruit and leaves of a mulberry tree and the eggs and larvae of the silkworm moth.

Due to its small size and ease of culture, the silkworm has become a model organism in the study of lepidopteran and arthropod biology. Many research works have focused on the genetics of silk moths and the possibility of genetic engineering. Hundreds of strains are maintained, and over 400 Mendelian mutations have been described. Another source suggests 1,000 inbred domesticated strains are kept worldwide. One useful development for the silk industry is silkworms that can feed on food other than mulberry leaves, including an artificial diet. Research on the genome also raises the possibility of genetically engineering silkworms to produce proteins, including pharmacological drugs, in the place of silk proteins. Bombyx mori females are also one of the few organisms with homologous chromosomes held together only by the synaptonemal complex (and not crossovers) during meiosis. In the oocytes of B. mori, meiosis is completely achiasmate (lacking crossovers). Even though synaptonemal complexes are formed during the pachytene stage of meiosis in B. mori, crossing-over homologous recombination does not occur between the paired chromosomes.

Kraig Biocraft Laboratories has used research from the Universities of Wyoming and Notre Dame in a collaborative effort to create a silkworm that is genetically altered to produce spider silk. In September 2010, the effort was announced as successful.

Researchers at Tufts developed scaffolds made of spongy silk that feel and look similar to human tissue. They are implanted during reconstructive surgery to support or restructure damaged ligaments, tendons, and other tissue. They created under-skin implants made of silk and drug compounds for steady and gradual time release of medications.

Researchers at the MIT Media Lab experimented with silkworms to see what they would weave when left on surfaces with different curvatures. They found that on particularly straight webs of lines, the silkworms connected neighboring lines with silk, weaving directly onto the given shape. Using this knowledge they built a silk pavilion with 6,500 silkworms over a number of days.

Silkworms have been used in antibiotic discovery, as they have several advantageous traits compared to other invertebrate models. Antibiotics such as lysocin E, a non-ribosomal peptide synthesized by Lysobacter sp. RH2180-5 and GPI0363 are among the notable antibiotics discovered using silkworms. In addition, antibiotics with appropriate pharmacokinetic parameters were selected that correlated with therapeutic activity in the silkworm infection model.

Silkworms have been used for the identification of novel virulence factors of pathogenic microorganisms. A first large-scale screening using transposon mutant library of Staphylococcus aureus USA300 strain was performed which identified 8 new genes with roles in full virulence of S. aureus. Another study by the same team of researchers revealed, for the first time, the role of YjbH in virulence and oxidative stress tolerance in vivo.

=== As food ===
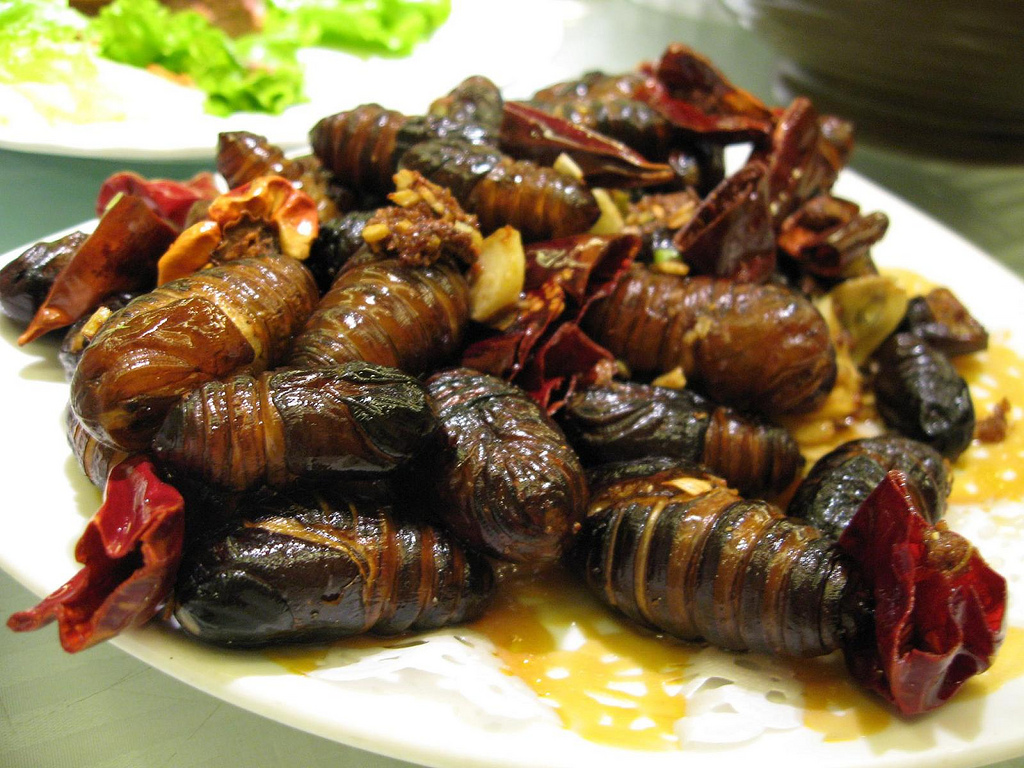
Silkworm pupae dishes

Silk moth pupae are edible insects and are eaten in some cultures:

- In Assam, India, they are boiled for extracting silk and the boiled pupae are eaten directly with salt or fried with chili pepper or herbs as a snack or dish. Live pupae may be eaten raw, boiled or fried.
- In Korea, they are boiled and seasoned to make a popular snack food known as beondegi (번데기).
- In China, street vendors sell roasted silk moth pupae. The silkworm droppings (cánshā, 蠶沙/蚕沙) are secretions used in traditional Chinese medicine.
- In Japan, silkworms are usually served as a tsukudani (佃煮), i.e., boiled in a sweet-sour sauce made with soy sauce and sugar.
- In Vietnam, this is known as nhộng tằm, usually boiled, seasoned with fish sauce, then stir-fried and eaten as main dish with rice.
- In Thailand, roasted silkworm is often sold at open markets. They are also sold as packaged snacks.

In China, silkworms have also been proposed for cultivation as space food on long-term missions.

== In culture ==
=== China ===
The Chinese guarded their knowledge of silk, but, according to one story, a Chinese princess given in marriage to a Khotan prince brought to the oasis the secret of silk manufacture, "hiding silkworms in her hair as part of her dowry", probably in the first half of the first century AD.

=== Vietnam ===
According to a Vietnamese folk tale, silkworms were originally a beautiful housemaid running away from her gruesome masters and living in the mountain, where she was protected by the mountain god. One day, a lecherous god from the heaven came down to Earth to seduce women. When he saw her, he tried to rape her but she was able to escape and was hidden by the mountain god. The lecherous god then tried to find and capture her by setting a net trap around the mountain. With the blessing of Guanyin, the girl was able to safely swallow that net into her stomach. Finally, the evil god summons his fellow thunder and rain gods to attack and burn away her clothes, forcing her to hide in a cave. Naked and cold, she spit out the net and used it as a blanket to sleep. The girl died in her sleep, and as she wished to continue to help other people, her soul turned into silkworms.

== Diseases ==
- Beauveria bassiana, a fungus, destroys the entire silkworm body. This fungus usually appears when silkworms are raised under cold conditions with high humidity. This disease is not passed on to the eggs from moths, as the infected silkworms cannot survive to the moth stage. This fungus, however, can spread to other insects.
- Grasserie, also known as nuclear polyhedrosis, milky disease, or hanging disease, is caused by infection with the Bombyx mori nucleopolyhedrovirus (aka Bombyx mori nuclear polyhedrosis virus, genus Alphabaculovirus).
- Pébrine is a disease caused by a parasitic microsporidian, Nosema bombycis.
- Flacherie is a viral disease, important in Indian sericulture.
- Several diseases caused by fungi are collectively named Muscardine.

== See also ==
- Cocoonase
- History of silk
- Japanese silk
- Lao silk
- List of animals that produce silk
- List of domesticated animals
- Samia cynthia
- Silk Road
- Thai silk
