= Racinoa signicosta =

Scientific classification
- Domain: Eukaryota
- Kingdom: Animalia
- Phylum: Arthropoda
- Class: Insecta
- Order: Lepidoptera
- Family: Bombycidae
- Genus: Racinoa
- Species: R. signicosta

Binomial name
- Racinoa signicosta (Strand, 1910)

Synonyms
- Ocinara signicosta Strand, 1910

Species of moth

Racinoa signicosta is a moth in the Bombycidae family. It was described by Embrik Strand in 1910. It is found in Tanzania and possibly Ethiopia.
