= Cheneya morissa =

Scientific classification
- Domain: Eukaryota
- Kingdom: Animalia
- Phylum: Arthropoda
- Class: Insecta
- Order: Lepidoptera
- Family: Bombycidae
- Subfamily: Epiinae
- Genus: Cheneya
- Species: C. morissa

Binomial name
- Cheneya morissa Schaus, 1929

Species of moth

Cheneya morissa is a moth in the Bombycidae family. It was described by Schaus in 1929. It is found in Mexico.
