= Racinoa albivertex =

Scientific classification
- Kingdom: Animalia
- Phylum: Arthropoda
- Class: Insecta
- Order: Lepidoptera
- Family: Bombycidae
- Genus: Racinoa
- Species: R. albivertex

Binomial name
- Racinoa albivertex (Strand, 1910)

Synonyms
- Ocinara albivertex Strand, 1910

Species of moth

Racinoa albivertex is a moth in the Bombycidae family. It was described by Strand in 1910. It is found in Togo.
