= Colla coelestis =

Scientific classification
- Domain: Eukaryota
- Kingdom: Animalia
- Phylum: Arthropoda
- Class: Insecta
- Order: Lepidoptera
- Family: Bombycidae
- Genus: Colla
- Species: C. coelestis

Binomial name
- Colla coelestis Schaus, 1910

Species of moth

Colla coelestis is a moth in the Bombycidae family. It was described by Schaus in 1910. It is found in Costa Rica.
