= Colla similis =

Scientific classification
- Domain: Eukaryota
- Kingdom: Animalia
- Phylum: Arthropoda
- Class: Insecta
- Order: Lepidoptera
- Family: Bombycidae
- Genus: Colla
- Species: C. similis

Binomial name
- Colla similis (Felder, 1874)

Synonyms
- Orgyopsis similis Felder, 1874

Species of insect

Colla similis is a moth in the Bombycidae family. It was described by Felder in 1868. It is found in the Neotropical realm.
