= Elachyophtalma flava =

Scientific classification
- Domain: Eukaryota
- Kingdom: Animalia
- Phylum: Arthropoda
- Class: Insecta
- Order: Lepidoptera
- Family: Bombycidae
- Genus: Elachyophtalma
- Species: E. flava

Binomial name
- Elachyophtalma flava van Eecke, 1924

Species of moth

Elachyophtalma flava is a moth in the Bombycidae family. It was described by van Eecke in 1924. It is found in New Guinea.
