= Elachyophtalma keiensis =

Scientific classification
- Domain: Eukaryota
- Kingdom: Animalia
- Phylum: Arthropoda
- Class: Insecta
- Order: Lepidoptera
- Family: Bombycidae
- Genus: Elachyophtalma
- Species: E. keiensis

Binomial name
- Elachyophtalma keiensis Rothschild, 1920

Species of moth

Elachyophtalma keiensis is a moth in the family Bombycidae. It was described by Walter Rothschild in 1920. It is found on Little Kai Island in Indonesia.

The wingspan is about 47 mm.
