= Triuncina cervina =

Scientific classification
- Kingdom: Animalia
- Phylum: Arthropoda
- Class: Insecta
- Order: Lepidoptera
- Family: Bombycidae
- Genus: Triuncina
- Species: T. cervina

Binomial name
- Triuncina cervina (Walker, 1865)

Synonyms
- Naprepa cervina Walker, 1865; Trilocha cervina; Ocinara cervina

Species of moth

Triuncina cervina is a moth in the family Bombycidae described by Francis Walker in 1865. It is found in northern India and Nepal.

The wingspan is 27–31 mm.
