= Quentalia veca =

Scientific classification
- Domain: Eukaryota
- Kingdom: Animalia
- Phylum: Arthropoda
- Class: Insecta
- Order: Lepidoptera
- Family: Bombycidae
- Genus: Quentalia
- Species: Q. veca

Binomial name
- Quentalia veca (H. Druce, 1887)

Synonyms
- Carthara veca H. Druce, 1887

Species of moth

Quentalia veca is a moth in the family Bombycidae. It was described by Herbert Druce in 1887. It is found in Panama.
