= Quentalia crenulosa =

Scientific classification
- Kingdom: Animalia
- Phylum: Arthropoda
- Class: Insecta
- Order: Lepidoptera
- Family: Bombycidae
- Genus: Quentalia
- Species: Q. crenulosa

Binomial name
- Quentalia crenulosa (Dyar, 1918)

Synonyms
- Carthara crenulosa Dyar, 1918

Species of moth

Quentalia crenulosa is a moth in the family Bombycidae. It was described by Harrison Gray Dyar Jr. in 1918. It is found in Mexico.
