= Quentalia lividia =

Scientific classification
- Domain: Eukaryota
- Kingdom: Animalia
- Phylum: Arthropoda
- Class: Insecta
- Order: Lepidoptera
- Family: Bombycidae
- Genus: Quentalia
- Species: Q. lividia

Binomial name
- Quentalia lividia (H. Druce, 1887)

Synonyms
- Carthara lividia H. Druce, 1887

Species of moth

Quentalia lividia is a moth in the family Bombycidae. It was described by Herbert Druce in 1887. It is found in Panama.
