= Anticla ortygia =

Scientific classification
- Kingdom: Animalia
- Phylum: Arthropoda
- Class: Insecta
- Order: Lepidoptera
- Family: Bombycidae
- Genus: Anticla
- Species: A. ortygia

Binomial name
- Anticla ortygia H. Druce, 1887

Synonyms
- Anthocroca amphea H. Druce, 1890

Species of moth

Anticla ortygia is a moth in the family Bombycidae. It was described by Herbert Druce in 1887. It is found in Panama.
