= Ocinara abbreviata =

Scientific classification
- Domain: Eukaryota
- Kingdom: Animalia
- Phylum: Arthropoda
- Class: Insecta
- Order: Lepidoptera
- Family: Bombycidae
- Genus: Ocinara
- Species: O. abbreviata

Binomial name
- Ocinara abbreviata Dierl, 1978

Species of moth

Ocinara abbreviata is a moth in the family Bombycidae. It was described by Wolfgang Dierl in 1978. It is found in the Philippines and Sulawesi.

The wingspan is 17–28 mm.
