= Epia casnonia =

Scientific classification
- Kingdom: Animalia
- Phylum: Arthropoda
- Class: Insecta
- Order: Lepidoptera
- Family: Bombycidae
- Genus: Epia
- Species: E. casnonia

Binomial name
- Epia casnonia (H. Druce, 1887)

Synonyms
- Hygrochroa casnonia H. Druce, 1887

Species of moth

Epia casnonia is a moth in the family Bombycidae first described by Herbert Druce in 1887. It is found in Panama.
