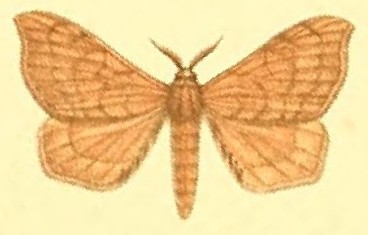

Scientific classification
- Domain: Eukaryota
- Kingdom: Animalia
- Phylum: Arthropoda
- Class: Insecta
- Order: Lepidoptera
- Family: Bombycidae
- Genus: Racinoa
- Species: R. metallescens

Binomial name
- Racinoa metallescens (Möschler, 1887)

Synonyms
- Opsirhina metallescens Möschler, 1887

= Racinoa metallescens =

Species of moth

Racinoa metallescens is a moth of the family Bombycidae first described by Heinrich Benno Möschler in 1887. It is found in the Democratic Republic of the Congo and in Ghana.
