= Quentalia drepanoides =

Scientific classification
- Kingdom: Animalia
- Phylum: Arthropoda
- Class: Insecta
- Order: Lepidoptera
- Family: Bombycidae
- Genus: Quentalia
- Species: Q. drepanoides

Binomial name
- Quentalia drepanoides (Walker, 1866)

Synonyms
- Pamea drepanoides Walker, 1866

Species of moth

Quentalia drepanoides is a moth in the family Bombycidae. It was described by Francis Walker in 1866. It is found from Mexico, Honduras and Guatemala to Colombia.
