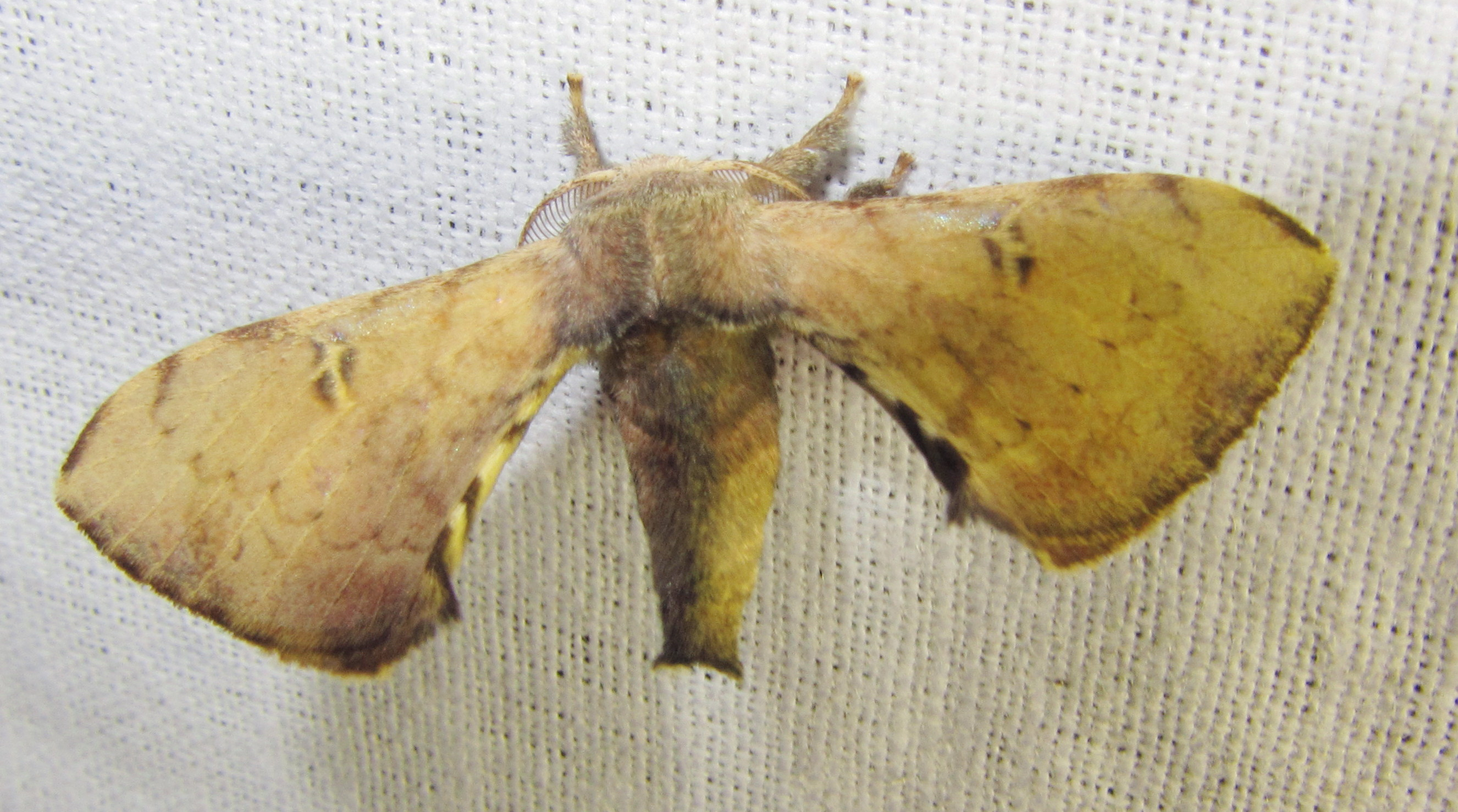
- Ocinara albicollis - Langka, East Kameng, Arunachal Pradesh, India, 12 April 2012

Scientific classification
- Kingdom: Animalia
- Phylum: Arthropoda
- Clade: Pancrustacea
- Class: Insecta
- Order: Lepidoptera
- Family: Bombycidae
- Genus: Ocinara
- Species: O. albicollis

Binomial name
- Ocinara albicollis (Walker, 1862)

Synonyms
- Naprepa albicollis Walker, 1862; Trilocha albicollis

= Ocinara albicollis =

Species of moth

Ocinara albicollis is a moth in the family Bombycidae. It was described by Francis Walker in 1862. It is found in Kenya, China, Thailand, Malaysia, India, Sri Lanka and on Sumatra, Java and Borneo. The habitat consists of lower and upper montane forests, but it has also been recorded in the lowlands.
