= Bivincula watsoni =

Scientific classification
- Kingdom: Animalia
- Phylum: Arthropoda
- Class: Insecta
- Order: Lepidoptera
- Family: Bombycidae
- Genus: Bivincula
- Species: B. watsoni

Binomial name
- Bivincula watsoni Dierl, 1978

Species of moth

Bivincula watsoni is a moth in the family Bombycidae. It was described by Wolfgang Dierl in 1978. It is found in Sikkim, India.

The wingspan is about 32 mm. The ground colour is white with grey markings.
