= Elachyophtalma flavolivacea =

Scientific classification
- Domain: Eukaryota
- Kingdom: Animalia
- Phylum: Arthropoda
- Class: Insecta
- Order: Lepidoptera
- Family: Bombycidae
- Genus: Elachyophtalma
- Species: E. flavolivacea

Binomial name
- Elachyophtalma flavolivacea (Rothschild, 1920)

Synonyms
- Gunda flavolivacea Rothschild, 1920

Species of moth

Elachyophtalma flavolivacea is a moth in the family Bombycidae. It was described by Walter Rothschild in 1920. It is found on New Guinea.
