= Epia parsenia =

Scientific classification
- Domain: Eukaryota
- Kingdom: Animalia
- Phylum: Arthropoda
- Class: Insecta
- Order: Lepidoptera
- Family: Bombycidae
- Genus: Epia
- Species: E. parsenia

Binomial name
- Epia parsenia Schaus, 1934

Species of moth

Epia parsenia is a moth in the Bombycidae family. It was described by Schaus in 1934. It is found in Peru.
