= Elachyophtalma inturbida =

Scientific classification
- Kingdom: Animalia
- Phylum: Arthropoda
- Class: Insecta
- Order: Lepidoptera
- Family: Bombycidae
- Genus: Elachyophtalma
- Species: E. inturbida

Binomial name
- Elachyophtalma inturbida (Walker, 1865)

Synonyms
- Leucoma inturbida Walker, 1865; Artaxa megaxantha Walker, 1866

Species of moth

Elachyophtalma inturbida is a moth in the family Bombycidae. It was described by Francis Walker in 1865. It is found on Sulawesi in Indonesia.
