= Racinoa spiralis =

Scientific classification
- Domain: Eukaryota
- Kingdom: Animalia
- Phylum: Arthropoda
- Class: Insecta
- Order: Lepidoptera
- Family: Bombycidae
- Genus: Racinoa
- Species: R. spiralis

Binomial name
- Racinoa spiralis (Kühne, 2008)

Synonyms
- Ocinara spiralis Kühne, 2008

Species of moth

Racinoa spiralis is a moth in the family Bombycidae. It was described by Lars Kühne in 2008. It is found in Kenya and Rwanda.
