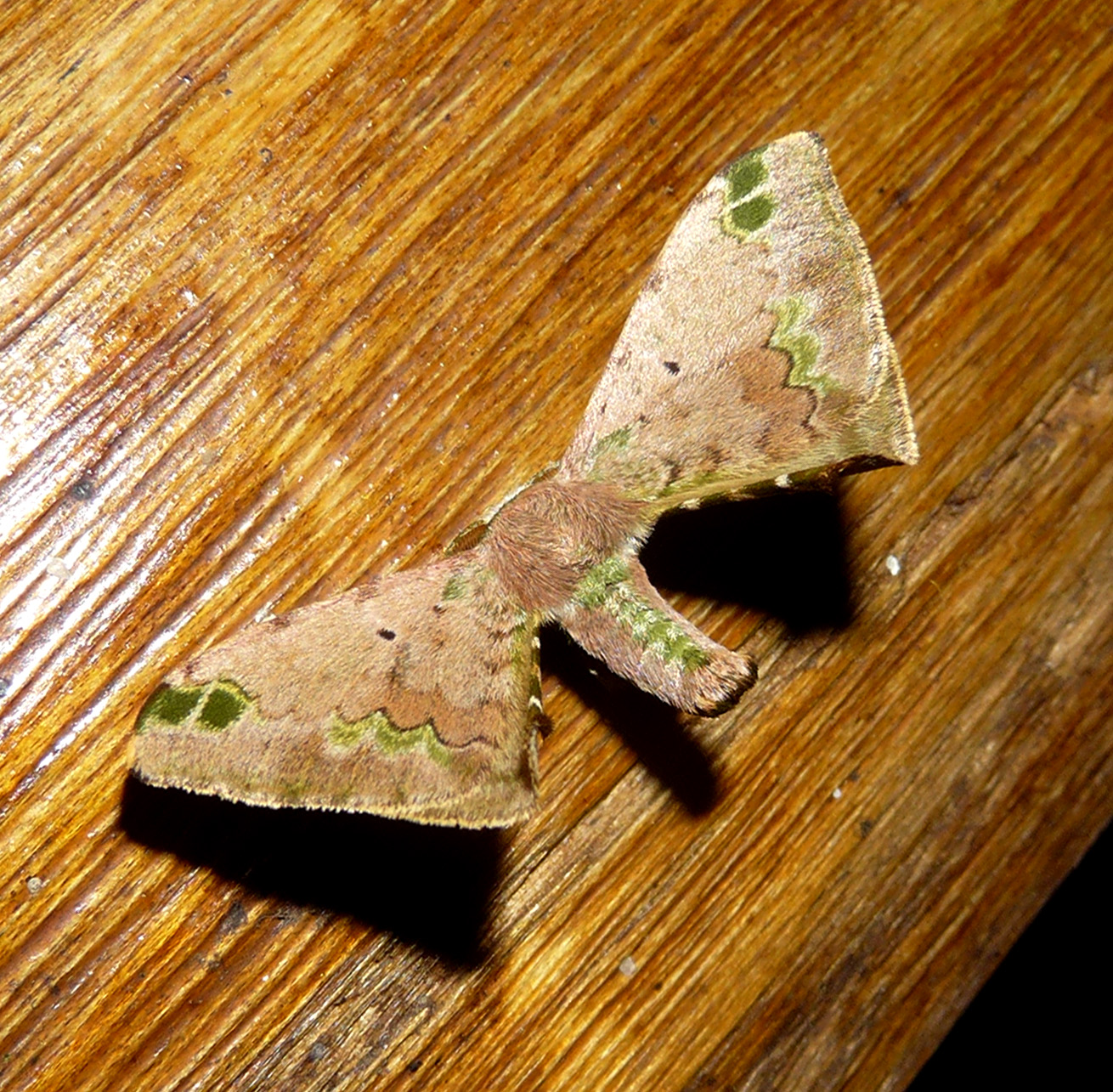

Scientific classification
- Kingdom: Animalia
- Phylum: Arthropoda
- Class: Insecta
- Order: Lepidoptera
- Family: Bombycidae
- Genus: Anticla
- Species: A. antica

Binomial name
- Anticla antica Walker, 1855

Synonyms
- Anticla carya Druce, 1887; Anthocroca amycla Druce, 1890

= Anticla antica =

Species of moth

Anticla antica is a moth in the family Bombycidae. It was described by Francis Walker in 1855. It is found in Venezuela. Familia: Bombycidae || Subfamilia: Epiinae || Genus: Anticla || Species: Anticla antica
