= Cheneya irrufata =

Scientific classification
- Domain: Eukaryota
- Kingdom: Animalia
- Phylum: Arthropoda
- Class: Insecta
- Order: Lepidoptera
- Family: Bombycidae
- Subfamily: Epiinae
- Genus: Cheneya
- Species: C. irrufata

Binomial name
- Cheneya irrufata (Dognin, 1911)

Synonyms
- Agriochlora irrufata Dognin, 1911

Species of moth

Cheneya irrufata is a moth in the Bombycidae family. It was described by Paul Dognin in 1911. It is found in Colombia.
