= Colla aminula =

Scientific classification
- Domain: Eukaryota
- Kingdom: Animalia
- Phylum: Arthropoda
- Class: Insecta
- Order: Lepidoptera
- Family: Bombycidae
- Genus: Colla
- Species: C. aminula

Binomial name
- Colla aminula H. Druce, 1890

Species of moth

Colla aminula is a moth in the family Bombycidae. It was described by Herbert Druce in 1890. It is found in Uruguay.
