= Elachyophtalma meeki =

Scientific classification
- Domain: Eukaryota
- Kingdom: Animalia
- Phylum: Arthropoda
- Class: Insecta
- Order: Lepidoptera
- Family: Bombycidae
- Genus: Elachyophtalma
- Species: E. meeki

Binomial name
- Elachyophtalma meeki Rothschild, 1920

Species of moth

Elachyophtalma meeki is a moth in the family Bombycidae. It was described by Walter Rothschild in 1920. It is found on New Guinea.

The wingspan is about 48 mm. The forewings are semi-vitreous pale golden yellow, the apical one-third densely sprinkled with grey scales. The hindwings are semi-vitreous pale golden yellow.
