= Ocinara polia =

Scientific classification
- Domain: Eukaryota
- Kingdom: Animalia
- Phylum: Arthropoda
- Class: Insecta
- Order: Lepidoptera
- Family: Bombycidae
- Genus: Ocinara
- Species: O. polia

Binomial name
- Ocinara polia (Tams, 1935)

Synonyms
- Trilocha polia Tams, 1935

Species of moth

Ocinara polia is a moth in the family Bombycidae. It was described by Willie Horace Thomas Tams in 1935. It is found on Sulawesi.

The wingspan is 23–38 mm.
