= Vinculinula diehli =

Scientific classification
- Domain: Eukaryota
- Kingdom: Animalia
- Phylum: Arthropoda
- Class: Insecta
- Order: Lepidoptera
- Family: Bombycidae
- Genus: Vinculinula
- Species: V. diehli

Binomial name
- Vinculinula diehli Dierl, 1978

Species of moth

Vinculinula diehli is a moth in the family Bombycidae. It was described by Wolfgang Dierl in 1978. It is found on Sumatra.

The wingspan is 24–27 mm. The ground colour is violet grey with brown markings.
