= Epia intricata =

Scientific classification
- Domain: Eukaryota
- Kingdom: Animalia
- Phylum: Arthropoda
- Class: Insecta
- Order: Lepidoptera
- Family: Bombycidae
- Genus: Epia
- Species: E. intricata

Binomial name
- Epia intricata H. Druce, 1904

Species of moth

Epia intricata is a moth in the family Bombycidae. It was described by Herbert Druce in 1904.
