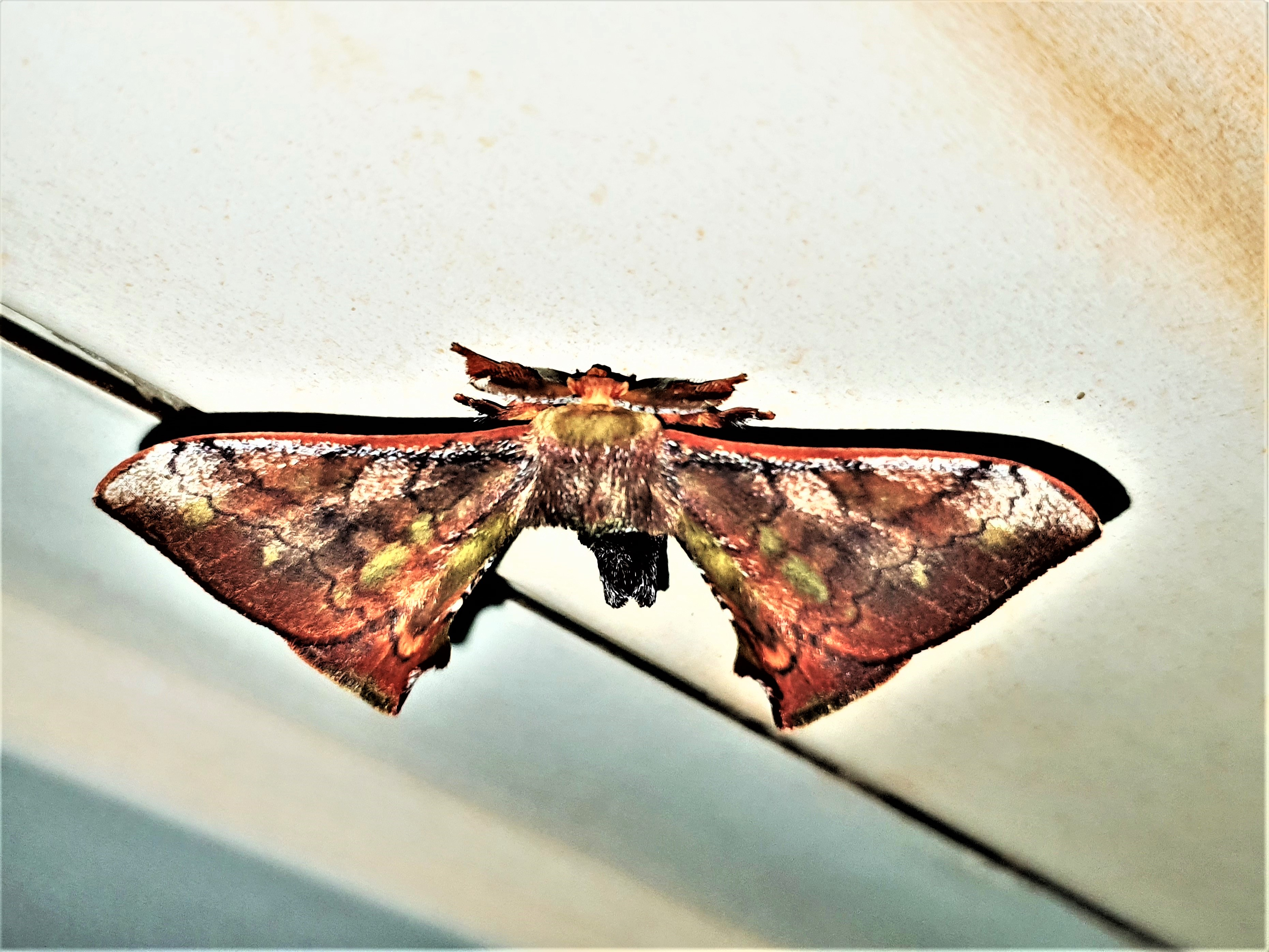
- Adult

Scientific classification
- Domain: Eukaryota
- Kingdom: Animalia
- Phylum: Arthropoda
- Class: Insecta
- Order: Lepidoptera
- Family: Bombycidae
- Genus: Epia
- Species: E. picta

Binomial name
- Epia picta Schaus, 1920

= Epia picta =

Species of moth

Epia picta is a moth in the family Bombycidae. It is found in Colombia.
