= Racinoa fuscocervina =

Scientific classification
- Kingdom: Animalia
- Phylum: Arthropoda
- Clade: Pancrustacea
- Class: Insecta
- Order: Lepidoptera
- Family: Bombycidae
- Genus: Racinoa
- Species: R. fuscocervina

Binomial name
- Racinoa fuscocervina (Strand, 1910)

Synonyms
- Ocinara fuscocervina Strand, 1910

Species of moth

Racinoa fuscocervina is a moth in the Bombycidae family. It was described by Strand in 1910. It is found in Togo.
