= Elachyophtalma goliathina =

Scientific classification
- Domain: Eukaryota
- Kingdom: Animalia
- Phylum: Arthropoda
- Class: Insecta
- Order: Lepidoptera
- Family: Bombycidae
- Genus: Elachyophtalma
- Species: E. goliathina

Binomial name
- Elachyophtalma goliathina Rothschild, 1920

Species of moth

Elachyophtalma goliathina is a moth in the family Bombycidae. It was described by Walter Rothschild in 1920. It is found on New Guinea.

The wingspan is 56–60 mm. Adults are dark chocolate brown with an indistinct darker zigzag antemedian line and two darker serpentine zigzag postmedian lines. The hindwings have a rufous tinge, and the abdominal margin has whitish lines on the edge.
