= Anticla symphora =

Scientific classification
- Kingdom: Animalia
- Phylum: Arthropoda
- Class: Insecta
- Order: Lepidoptera
- Family: Bombycidae
- Genus: Anticla
- Species: A. symphora

Binomial name
- Anticla symphora Schaus, 1929

Species of moth

Anticla symphora is a moth in the Bombycidae family. It was described by Schaus in 1929. It is found in the Neotropical realm.
