= Colla gaudialis =

Scientific classification
- Domain: Eukaryota
- Kingdom: Animalia
- Phylum: Arthropoda
- Class: Insecta
- Order: Lepidoptera
- Family: Bombycidae
- Genus: Colla
- Species: C. gaudialis

Binomial name
- Colla gaudialis Schaus, 1905

Species of moth

Colla gaudialis is a moth in the Bombycidae family. It was described by Schaus in 1905. It is found in French Guiana.
