= Ocinara bifurcula =

Scientific classification
- Domain: Eukaryota
- Kingdom: Animalia
- Phylum: Arthropoda
- Class: Insecta
- Order: Lepidoptera
- Family: Bombycidae
- Genus: Ocinara
- Species: O. bifurcula

Binomial name
- Ocinara bifurcula Dierl, 1978

Species of moth

Ocinara bifurcula is a moth in the family Bombycidae. It was described by Wolfgang Dierl in 1978. It is found on Sumatra, Peninsular Malaysia and Borneo. The habitat generally consists of lowland areas, but it has been recorded as high as 1,500 meters.

The wingspan is 20–26 mm.
