= Elachyophtalma melanoleuca =

Scientific classification
- Domain: Eukaryota
- Kingdom: Animalia
- Phylum: Arthropoda
- Class: Insecta
- Order: Lepidoptera
- Family: Bombycidae
- Genus: Elachyophtalma
- Species: E. melanoleuca

Binomial name
- Elachyophtalma melanoleuca Rothschild, 1920

Species of moth

Elachyophtalma melanoleuca is a moth in the family Bombycidae. It was described by Walter Rothschild in 1920. It is found on New Guinea.

The wingspan is about 55 mm. The forewings are sooty black with a white, broad and curved median band, reaching from the inner margin to just below the subcostal nervure. The hindwings are sooty black with a large, irregular, white triangular patch.
