= Ocinara dilectula =

Scientific classification
- Kingdom: Animalia
- Phylum: Arthropoda
- Class: Insecta
- Order: Lepidoptera
- Family: Bombycidae
- Genus: Ocinara
- Species: O. dilectula

Binomial name
- Ocinara dilectula Walker, 1856

Synonyms
- Bombyx waringi Snellen, 1877; Ocinara waringi

Species of moth

Ocinara dilectula is a moth in the family Bombycidae. It was described by Francis Walker in 1856. It is found on Java and possibly Sumatra.

The wingspan is 22–31 mm. The forewings are reddish brown.

The larvae have been recorded feeding on Ficus benjaminiana.
