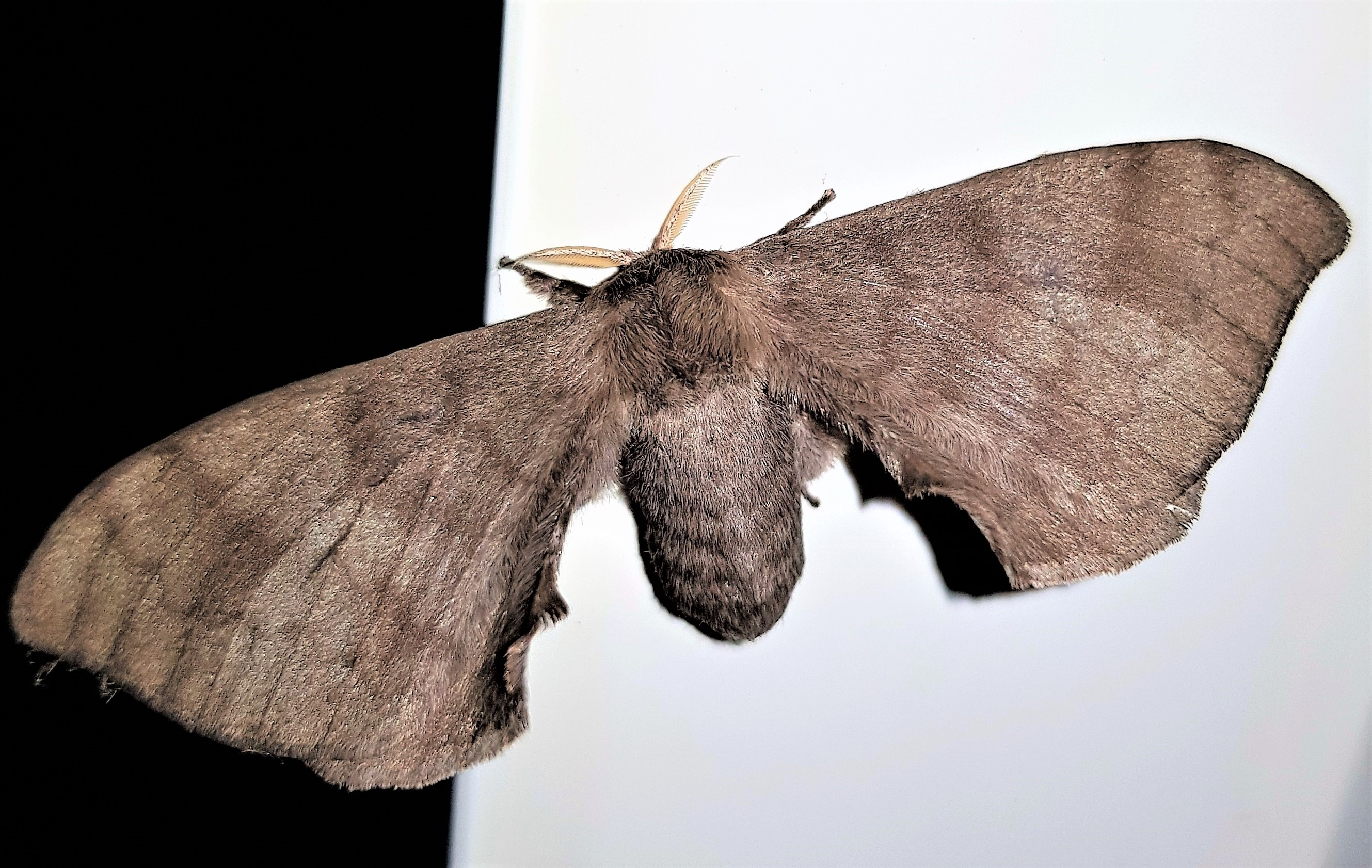

Scientific classification
- Kingdom: Animalia
- Phylum: Arthropoda
- Clade: Pancrustacea
- Class: Insecta
- Order: Lepidoptera
- Family: Bombycidae
- Genus: Epia
- Species: E. lunilinea

Binomial name
- Epia lunilinea Schaus, 1920

= Epia lunilinea =

Species of moth

Epia lunilinea is a moth in the family Bombycidae. It was described by William Schaus in 1920. It is found in Guyana.
