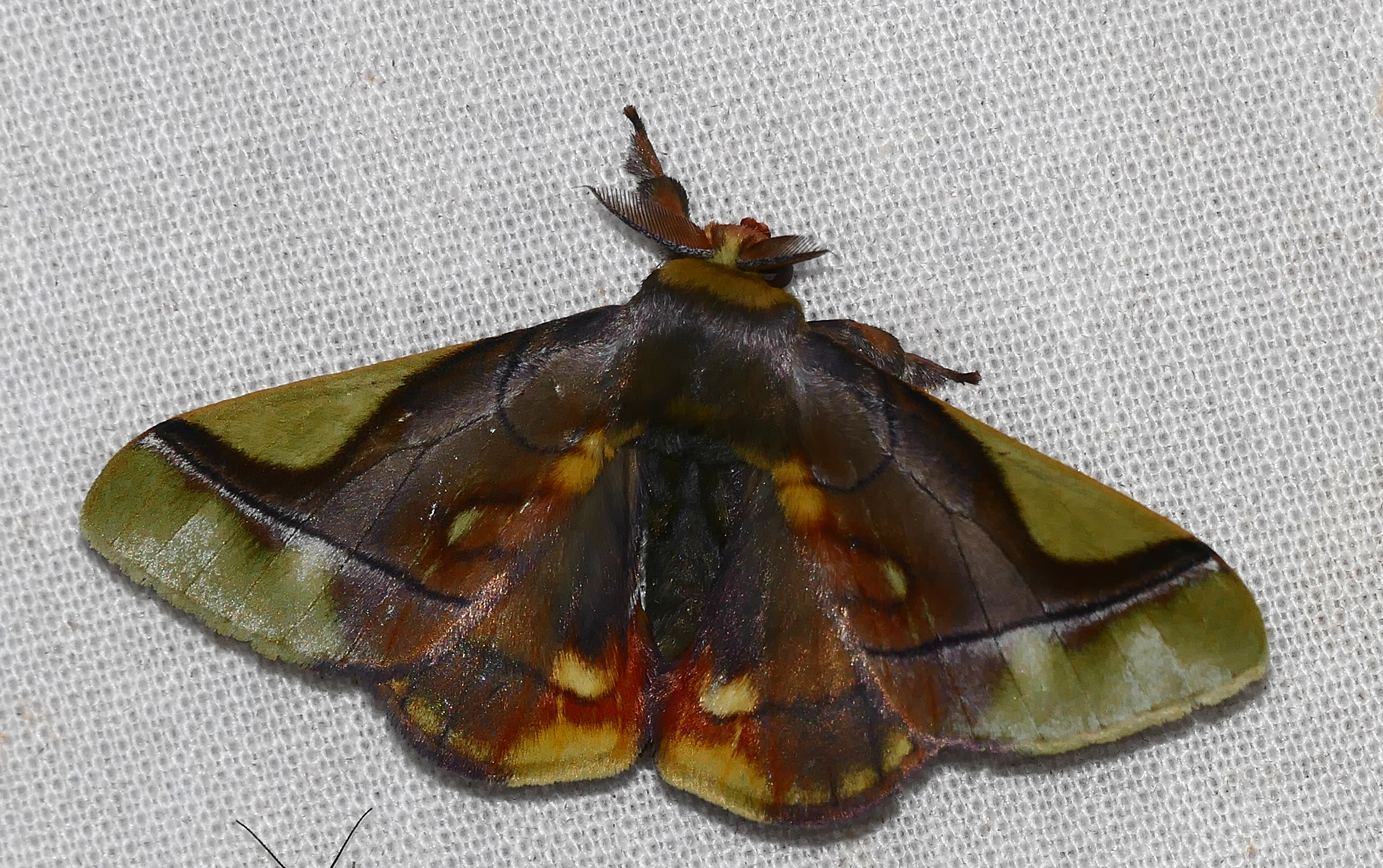

Scientific classification
- Kingdom: Animalia
- Phylum: Arthropoda
- Class: Insecta
- Order: Lepidoptera
- Family: Bombycidae
- Genus: Epia
- Species: E. muscosa

Binomial name
- Epia muscosa (Butler, 1878)

Synonyms
- Anthocroca muscosa Butler, 1878; Anthocroca cuneifera Butler, 1878

= Epia muscosa =

Species of moth

Epia muscosa is a moth in the family Bombycidae first described by Arthur Gardiner Butler in 1878. It is found from Mexico to the Amazon region.
