= Vingerhoedtia ruficollis =

Scientific classification
- Kingdom: Animalia
- Phylum: Arthropoda
- Class: Insecta
- Order: Lepidoptera
- Family: Bombycidae
- Genus: Vingerhoedtia
- Species: V. ruficollis

Binomial name
- Vingerhoedtia ruficollis (Strand, 1910)

Synonyms
- Ocinara ruficollis Strand, 1910

Species of moth

Vingerhoedtia ruficollis is a moth in the Bombycidae family. It was described by Strand in 1910. It is found in Cameroon, Guinea and Kenya.
