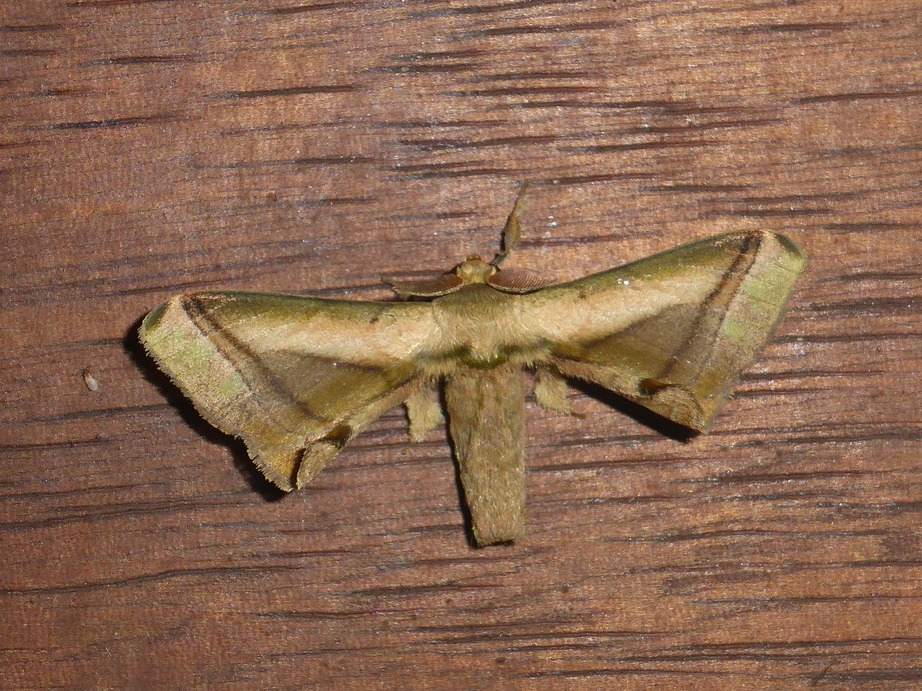

Scientific classification
- Domain: Eukaryota
- Kingdom: Animalia
- Phylum: Arthropoda
- Class: Insecta
- Order: Lepidoptera
- Family: Bombycidae
- Genus: Epia
- Species: E. lebethra

Binomial name
- Epia lebethra H. Druce, 1890

= Epia lebethra =

Species of moth

Epia lebethra is a moth in the family Bombycidae. It was described by Herbert Druce in 1890.
