= Colla netrix =

Scientific classification
- Kingdom: Animalia
- Phylum: Arthropoda
- Class: Insecta
- Order: Lepidoptera
- Family: Bombycidae
- Genus: Colla
- Species: C. netrix

Binomial name
- Colla netrix (Stoll, 1789)

Species of moth

Colla netrix is a moth in the Bombycidae family. It was described by Stoll in 1789. It can be identified by its foot pigmentation.
