= Colla jehlei =

Scientific classification
- Kingdom: Animalia
- Phylum: Arthropoda
- Class: Insecta
- Order: Lepidoptera
- Family: Bombycidae
- Genus: Colla
- Species: C. jehlei

Binomial name
- Colla jehlei Schade, 1939

Species of moth

Colla jehlei is a moth in the Bombycidae family. It was described by Schade in 1939. It was found in Paraguay.
