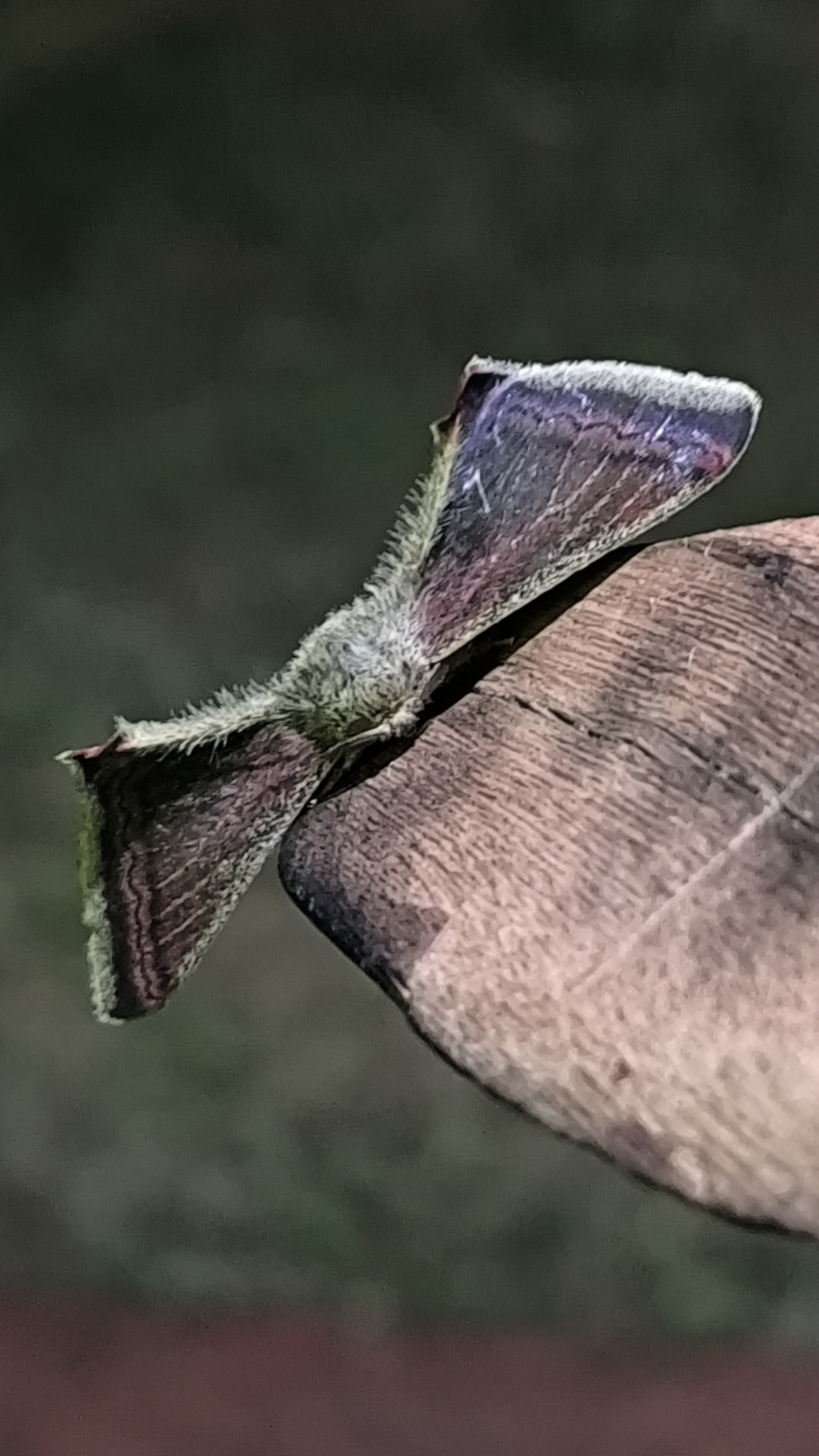

Scientific classification
- Kingdom: Animalia
- Phylum: Arthropoda
- Class: Insecta
- Order: Lepidoptera
- Family: Bombycidae
- Genus: Epia
- Species: E. erdae

Binomial name
- Epia erdae Schaus, 1928

= Epia erdae =

Species of moth

Epia erdae is a moth in the Bombycidae family. It was described by Schaus in 1928. It is found in Brazil.
