= Quentalia vittata =

Scientific classification
- Kingdom: Animalia
- Phylum: Arthropoda
- Class: Insecta
- Order: Lepidoptera
- Family: Bombycidae
- Genus: Quentalia
- Species: Q. vittata

Binomial name
- Quentalia vittata (Walker, 1855)

Synonyms
- Pamea vittata Walker, 1855

Species of moth

Quentalia vittata is a moth in the family Bombycidae. It was described by Francis Walker in 1855. It is found in Brazil.
