= Anticla flavaria =

Scientific classification
- Kingdom: Animalia
- Phylum: Arthropoda
- Class: Insecta
- Order: Lepidoptera
- Family: Bombycidae
- Genus: Anticla
- Species: A. flavaria

Binomial name
- Anticla flavaria (Cramer, 1781)

Synonyms
- Phalaena flavaria Cramer, [1780]; Anticla flavifascula Hübner, [1820]

Species of moth

Anticla flavaria is a moth in the family Bombycidae. It was described by Pieter Cramer in 1781. It is found in the Neotropical realm.
