= Anticla tarasia =

Scientific classification
- Kingdom: Animalia
- Phylum: Arthropoda
- Class: Insecta
- Order: Lepidoptera
- Family: Bombycidae
- Genus: Anticla
- Species: A. tarasia

Binomial name
- Anticla tarasia Schaus, 1929

Species of moth

Anticla tarasia is a moth in the Bombycidae family. It was described by Schaus in 1929. It is found in the Neotropical realm.
