= Colla glaucescens =

Scientific classification
- Kingdom: Animalia
- Phylum: Arthropoda
- Class: Insecta
- Order: Lepidoptera
- Family: Bombycidae
- Genus: Colla
- Species: C. glaucescens

Binomial name
- Colla glaucescens Walker, 1865

Synonyms
- Spanochroa blandiatrix Felder, 1874; Colla margaritacea Möschler

Species of moth

Colla glaucescens is a moth in the family Bombycidae. It was described by Francis Walker in 1865. It is found in Colombia and the Amazon region.
