= Racinoa ianthe =

Scientific classification
- Domain: Eukaryota
- Kingdom: Animalia
- Phylum: Arthropoda
- Class: Insecta
- Order: Lepidoptera
- Family: Bombycidae
- Genus: Racinoa
- Species: R. ianthe

Binomial name
- Racinoa ianthe (H. Druce, 1887)

Synonyms
- Trilocha ianthe H. Druce, 1887

Species of moth

Racinoa ianthe is a moth in the family Bombycidae. It was described by Herbert Druce in 1887. It is found in South Africa and the Gambia.
