= Anticla limosa =

Scientific classification
- Kingdom: Animalia
- Phylum: Arthropoda
- Class: Insecta
- Order: Lepidoptera
- Family: Bombycidae
- Genus: Anticla
- Species: A. limosa

Binomial name
- Anticla limosa Schaus, 1892

Species of moth

Anticla limosa is a moth in the Bombycidae family. It was described by Schaus in 1892. It is found in the Neotropical realm.
