= Elachyophtalma picaria =

Scientific classification
- Kingdom: Animalia
- Phylum: Arthropoda
- Clade: Pancrustacea
- Class: Insecta
- Order: Lepidoptera
- Family: Bombycidae
- Genus: Elachyophtalma
- Species: E. picaria

Binomial name
- Elachyophtalma picaria (Walker, 1865)

Synonyms
- Laganda picaria Walker, 1865

Species of moth

Elachyophtalma picaria is a moth in the family Bombycidae. It was described by Francis Walker in 1865. It is found on New Guinea.
