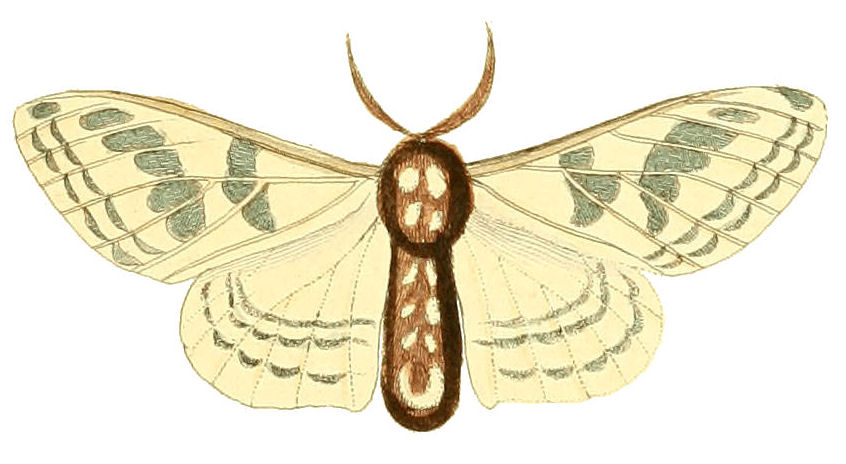
- Illustration by Dru Drury

Scientific classification
- Kingdom: Animalia
- Phylum: Arthropoda
- Class: Insecta
- Order: Lepidoptera
- Family: Bombycidae
- Genus: Colla
- Species: C. rhodope

Binomial name
- Colla rhodope (Drury, 1782)

Synonyms
- Phalaena rhodope Drury, 1782; Colla opalina Butler; Prismoptera opalina Butler, 1878

= Colla rhodope =

Species of moth

Colla rhodope is a moth in the family Bombycidae. It was described by Dru Drury in 1782. It is found from Mexico to Colombia, Ecuador and Brazil.

== Description ==
Upperside: Antennae pectinated. Thorax and abdomen dark-brown, with some faint whiteish marks. Wings transparent white, having two rows of greenish crescents running along the external edges, the anterior wings having some faint marks of the same kind in the middle also. The anterior edges are of a yellow hue.

Underside: Palpi white. Tongue not observed. Legs, breast, and abdomen white. Anus dark-brown. Wings coloured as on the upperside; the posterior ones having two brown spots on each near the abdominal corners. Margins of the wings entire. Wingspan 2 1/2 inches (64 mm).
