= Epia domina =

Scientific classification
- Kingdom: Animalia
- Phylum: Arthropoda
- Class: Insecta
- Order: Lepidoptera
- Family: Bombycidae
- Genus: Epia
- Species: E. domina

Binomial name
- Epia domina (Cramer, [1780])

Synonyms
- Phalaena domina Cramer, [1780]

Species of moth

Epia domina is a moth in the family Bombycidae first described by Pieter Cramer in 1780. It is found in Suriname.
