= Bivincula diaphana =

Scientific classification
- Kingdom: Animalia
- Phylum: Arthropoda
- Class: Insecta
- Order: Lepidoptera
- Family: Bombycidae
- Genus: Bivincula
- Species: B. diaphana

Binomial name
- Bivincula diaphana (Moore, 1879)

Synonyms
- Ocinara signifera f. diaphana Moore, 1879; Ocinara cyproba C. Swinhoe, 1894

Species of moth

Bivincula diaphana is a moth in the family Bombycidae. It was described by Frederic Moore in 1879. It is found in the eastern Himalayas.

The wingspan is 25–29 mm. The ground colour is white with light grey markings.
