= Colla klagesi =

Scientific classification
- Domain: Eukaryota
- Kingdom: Animalia
- Phylum: Arthropoda
- Class: Insecta
- Order: Lepidoptera
- Family: Bombycidae
- Genus: Colla
- Species: C. klagesi

Binomial name
- Colla klagesi Warren, 1901

Synonyms
- Agriochlora klagesi

Species of moth

Colla klagesi is a moth in the Bombycidae family. It was described by Warren in 1901, and originally placed in its own genus, Agriochlora, which has since been synonymized. It is found in Venezuela.
