= Vingerhoedtia grisea =

Scientific classification
- Kingdom: Animalia
- Phylum: Arthropoda
- Class: Insecta
- Order: Lepidoptera
- Family: Bombycidae
- Genus: Vingerhoedtia
- Species: V. grisea

Binomial name
- Vingerhoedtia grisea (Gaede, 1927)

Synonyms
- Ocinara grisea Gaede, 1927

Species of moth

Vingerhoedtia grisea is a moth in the family Bombycidae. It was described by Max Gaede in 1927. It is found in Cameroon.
