= Ocinara albiceps =

Scientific classification
- Kingdom: Animalia
- Phylum: Arthropoda
- Class: Insecta
- Order: Lepidoptera
- Family: Bombycidae
- Genus: Ocinara
- Species: O. albiceps

Binomial name
- Ocinara albiceps (Walker, 1862)

Synonyms
- Naprepa albiceps Walker, 1862; Trilocha albiceps

Species of moth

Ocinara albiceps is a moth in the family Bombycidae. It was described by Francis Walker in 1862. It is found in Sundaland. The habitat consists of lowland areas, especially alluvial forests, as well as the lower montane zone.

The wingspan is 20–34 mm.

== Subspecies ==
- Ocinara albiceps albiceps
- Ocinara albiceps obscurata Dierl, 1978 (Java)
