= Colla micacea =

Scientific classification
- Kingdom: Animalia
- Phylum: Arthropoda
- Class: Insecta
- Order: Lepidoptera
- Family: Bombycidae
- Genus: Colla
- Species: C. micacea

Binomial name
- Colla micacea (Walker, 1865)

Synonyms
- Aza micacea Walker, 1865; Colla albescens Schaus, 1905

Species of moth

Colla micacea is a moth in the family Bombycidae. It was described by Francis Walker in 1865. It is found in Colombia and French Guiana.
