= Racinoa leucoides =

Scientific classification
- Domain: Eukaryota
- Kingdom: Animalia
- Phylum: Arthropoda
- Class: Insecta
- Order: Lepidoptera
- Family: Bombycidae
- Genus: Racinoa
- Species: R. leucoides

Binomial name
- Racinoa leucoides (Strand, 1910)

Synonyms
- Ocinara leucoides Strand, 1910

Species of moth

Racinoa leucoides is a moth in the Bombycidae family. It was described by Strand in 1910. It is found in Tanzania.

The larvae feed on Ficus elastica.
