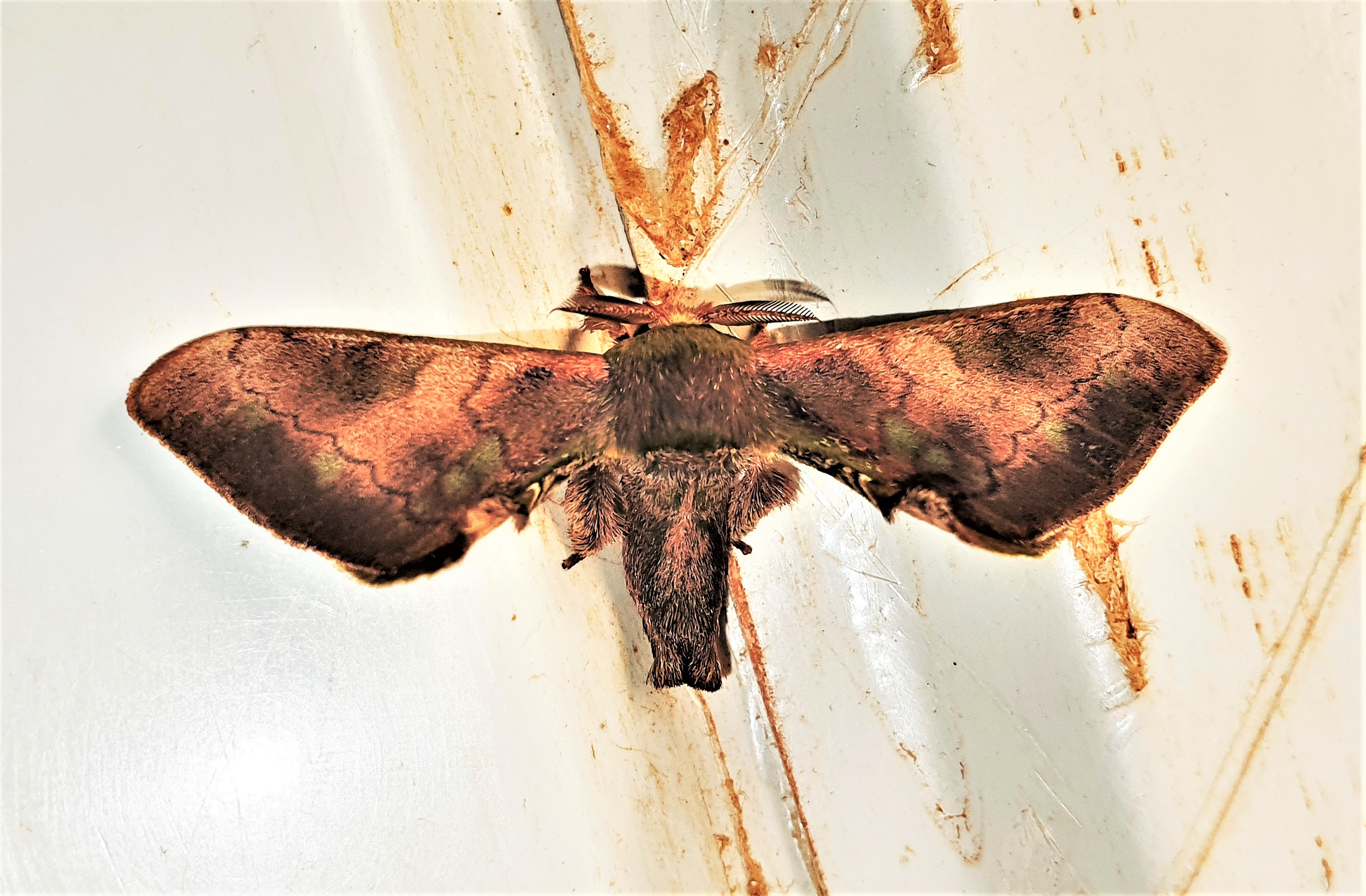

Scientific classification
- Domain: Eukaryota
- Kingdom: Animalia
- Phylum: Arthropoda
- Class: Insecta
- Order: Lepidoptera
- Family: Bombycidae
- Genus: Epia
- Species: E. vulnerata

Binomial name
- Epia vulnerata Felder, 1868

= Epia vulnerata =

Species of moth

Epia vulnerata is a species of moth in the family Bombycidae.
