= Epia madeira =

Scientific classification
- Domain: Eukaryota
- Kingdom: Animalia
- Phylum: Arthropoda
- Class: Insecta
- Order: Lepidoptera
- Family: Bombycidae
- Genus: Epia
- Species: E. madeira

Binomial name
- Epia madeira Schaus, 1920

Species of moth

Epia madeira is a moth in the Bombycidae family. It was described by Schaus in 1920. It is found in Brazil.
