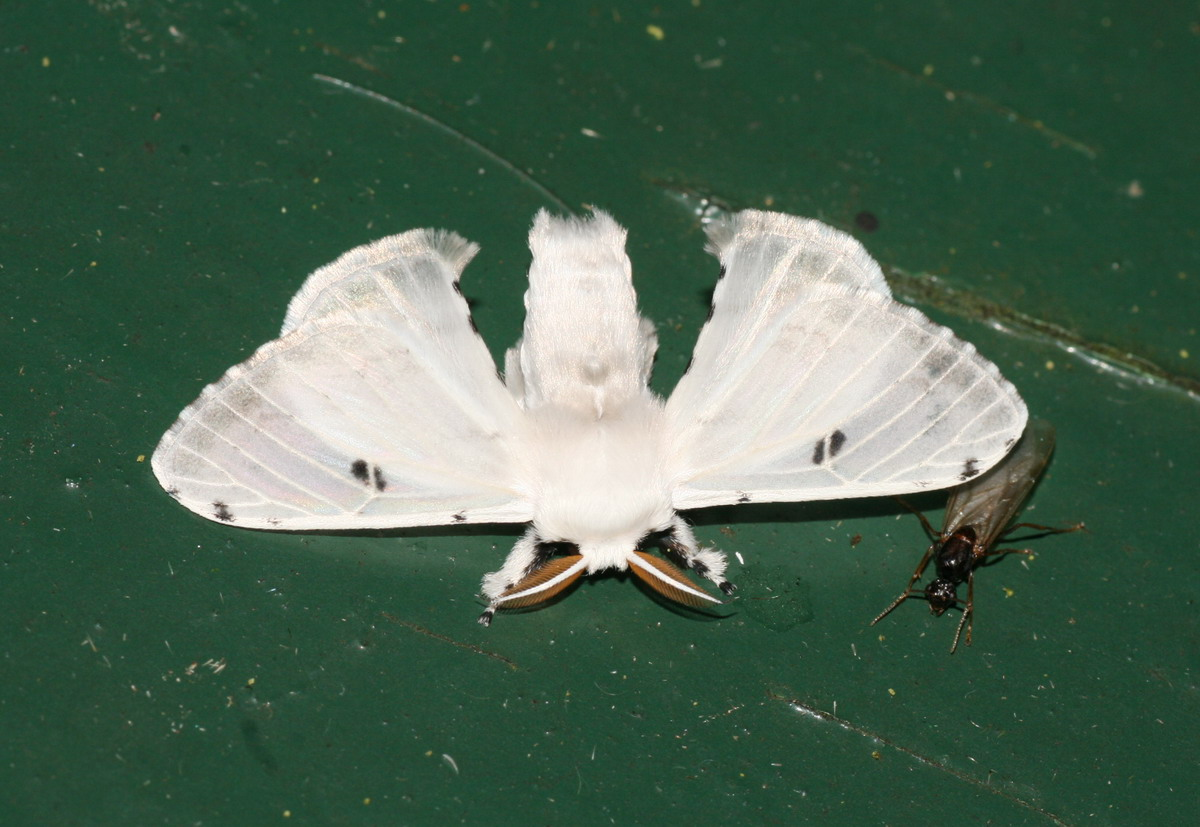

Scientific classification
- Kingdom: Animalia
- Phylum: Arthropoda
- Class: Insecta
- Order: Lepidoptera
- Family: Bombycidae
- Genus: Penicillifera
- Species: P. apicalis

Binomial name
- Penicillifera apicalis (Walker, 1862)

Synonyms
- Dasychira apicalis Walker, 1862; Dasychira signifera Walker, 1862; Ocinara signifera (Walker, 1862)

= Penicillifera apicalis =

Species of moth

Penicillifera apicalis, the Oriental white silk-moth is a moth of the family Bombycidae first described by Francis Walker in 1862. It is found from the north-eastern parts of the Himalaya to Sundaland and the Philippines.
