= Racinoa pallicornis =

Scientific classification
- Domain: Eukaryota
- Kingdom: Animalia
- Phylum: Arthropoda
- Class: Insecta
- Order: Lepidoptera
- Family: Bombycidae
- Genus: Racinoa
- Species: R. pallicornis

Binomial name
- Racinoa pallicornis (Strand, 1910)

Synonyms
- Ocinara pallicornis Strand, 1910

Species of moth

Racinoa pallicornis is a moth in the Bombycidae family. It was described by Strand in 1910. It is found in South Africa.
