= Rovena =

Rovena is a given name and surname. Notable people with the name include:

- Rovena Stefa (born 1979), Albanian singer
- Rovena Marku, Olympic freestyle swimmer from Albania
- Marcella Rovena, Italian film and voice actress

== See also ==
- Cheneya rovena, a moth in the family Bombycidae
- RoVena, a NGO dedicated to education opportunities for Rohingya refugees
