= Cheneya =

Scientific classification
- Domain: Eukaryota
- Kingdom: Animalia
- Phylum: Arthropoda
- Class: Insecta
- Order: Lepidoptera
- Family: Bombycidae
- Subfamily: Epiinae
- Genus: Cheneya; Schaus, 1929

Genus of moths

Cheneya is a small genus of moths of the family Bombycidae, within which it is placed in subfamily Epiinae.

== Species ==
- Cheneya irrufata Dognin, 1911
- Cheneya morissa Schaus, 1929
- Cheneya rovena Schaus, 1929
