= Anticla rutila =

Scientific classification
- Kingdom: Animalia
- Phylum: Arthropoda
- Class: Insecta
- Order: Lepidoptera
- Family: Bombycidae
- Genus: Anticla
- Species: A. rutila

Binomial name
- Anticla rutila (H. Druce, 1887)

Synonyms
- Hygrochola rutila H. Druce, 1887

Species of moth

Anticla rutila is a moth in the family Bombycidae. It was described by Herbert Druce in 1887. It is found in Nicaragua.
