= Racinoa zolotuhini =

Scientific classification
- Kingdom: Animalia
- Phylum: Arthropoda
- Class: Insecta
- Order: Lepidoptera
- Family: Bombycidae
- Genus: Racinoa
- Species: R. zolotuhini

Binomial name
- Racinoa zolotuhini (Kühne, 2008)

Synonyms
- Ocinara zolotuhini Kühne, 2008

Species of moth

Racinoa zolotuhini is a moth in the family Bombycidae. It was described by Lars Kühne in 2008. It is found in Kenya.
