= Elachyophtalma tricolor =

Scientific classification
- Domain: Eukaryota
- Kingdom: Animalia
- Phylum: Arthropoda
- Class: Insecta
- Order: Lepidoptera
- Family: Bombycidae
- Genus: Elachyophtalma
- Species: E. tricolor

Binomial name
- Elachyophtalma tricolor C. Felder, 1861

Species of moth

Elachyophtalma tricolor is a moth in the family Bombycidae. It was described by Cajetan Felder in 1861. It is found on the Moluccas.
