= Elachyophtalma cotanoides =

Scientific classification
- Domain: Eukaryota
- Kingdom: Animalia
- Phylum: Arthropoda
- Class: Insecta
- Order: Lepidoptera
- Family: Bombycidae
- Genus: Elachyophtalma
- Species: E. cotanoides

Binomial name
- Elachyophtalma cotanoides Rothschild, 1920

Species of moth

Elachyophtalma cotanoides is a moth in the family Bombycidae. It was described by Walter Rothschild in 1920. It is found on New Guinea.

The wingspan is 56 mm. The forewings are chocolate rufous, the basal three-fifths of the costal are area orange and the nervures golden yellow washed with rufous on the inner four-fifths of the wing. There is a darker rufous and yellow double postmedian band. The hindwings are chocolate rufous.
