= Elachyophtalma kebeae =

Scientific classification
- Domain: Eukaryota
- Kingdom: Animalia
- Phylum: Arthropoda
- Class: Insecta
- Order: Lepidoptera
- Family: Bombycidae
- Genus: Elachyophtalma
- Species: E. kebeae

Binomial name
- Elachyophtalma kebeae (Bethune-Baker, 1904)

Synonyms
- Gunda kebeae Bethune-Baker, 1904; Gunda kebeae flava Joicey & Talbot, 1916

Species of moth

Elachyophtalma kebeae is a moth in the family Bombycidae. It was described by George Thomas Bethune-Baker in 1904. It is found on New Guinea.

The wingspan is 47 mm. The forewings are maroon-chocolate brown, the disc sprinkled with yellowish hairlike scales. There is an indistinct antemedial, strongly zigzag shadow band. The hindwings are maroon-chocolate brown, the inner one-third sprinkled with yellow hair scales.
