= Elachyophtalma bicolor =

Scientific classification
- Domain: Eukaryota
- Kingdom: Animalia
- Phylum: Arthropoda
- Class: Insecta
- Order: Lepidoptera
- Family: Bombycidae
- Genus: Elachyophtalma
- Species: E. bicolor

Binomial name
- Elachyophtalma bicolor (Bethune-Baker, 1904)

Synonyms
- Diversosexus bicolor Bethune-Baker, 1904

Species of moth

Elachyophtalma bicolor is a moth in the Bombycidae family. It was described by George Thomas Bethune-Baker in 1904. It is found in New Guinea.
