= Triuncina diaphragma =

Scientific classification
- Domain: Eukaryota
- Kingdom: Animalia
- Phylum: Arthropoda
- Class: Insecta
- Order: Lepidoptera
- Family: Bombycidae
- Genus: Triuncina
- Species: T. diaphragma

Binomial name
- Triuncina diaphragma (Mell, 1958)

Synonyms
- Ocinara diaphragma Mell, 1958; Ocinara nitidoidea Chu & Wang, 1993

Species of moth

Triuncina diaphragma is a moth in the family Bombycidae. It was described by Rudolf Mell in 1958. It is found in China and Vietnam.
