= Amusaron pruinosa =

Scientific classification
- Kingdom: Animalia
- Phylum: Arthropoda
- Class: Insecta
- Order: Lepidoptera
- Family: Bombycidae
- Genus: Amusaron
- Species: A. pruinosa

Binomial name
- Amusaron pruinosa (Grünberg, 1907)

Synonyms
- Norasuma pruinosa Grünberg, 1907

Species of moth

Amusaron pruinosa is a moth in the family Bombycidae. It was described by Karl Grünberg in 1907. It is found in Cameroon.
