= Triuncina religiosae =

Scientific classification
- Domain: Eukaryota
- Kingdom: Animalia
- Phylum: Arthropoda
- Class: Insecta
- Order: Lepidoptera
- Family: Bombycidae
- Genus: Triuncina
- Species: T. religiosae

Binomial name
- Triuncina religiosae (Helfer, 1837)

Synonyms
- Bombyx religiosae Helfer, 1837; Theophila religiosae

Species of moth

Triuncina religiosae is a moth in the family Bombycidae. It was described by Johann Wilhelm Helfer in 1837. It is found in India.
