= Elachyophtalma doreyana =

Scientific classification
- Domain: Eukaryota
- Kingdom: Animalia
- Phylum: Arthropoda
- Class: Insecta
- Order: Lepidoptera
- Family: Bombycidae
- Genus: Elachyophtalma
- Species: E. doreyana

Binomial name
- Elachyophtalma doreyana Rothschild, 1920

Species of moth

Elachyophtalma doreyana is a moth in the family Bombycidae. It was described by Walter Rothschild in 1920. It is found on New Guinea.

The wingspan is 38–57 mm. Adults are uniform rufous chocolate, with a small yellow half-moon-shaped discocellular stigma on the forewings, and white streaks on the abdominal margin of the hindwings.
