= Vinculinula attacoides =

Scientific classification
- Kingdom: Animalia
- Phylum: Arthropoda
- Class: Insecta
- Order: Lepidoptera
- Family: Bombycidae
- Genus: Vinculinula
- Species: V. attacoides

Binomial name
- Vinculinula attacoides (Walker, 1862)

Synonyms
- Naprepa attacoides Walker, 1862; Trilocha attacoides; Ocinara attacoides

Species of moth

Vinculinula attacoides is a moth in the family Bombycidae. It was described by Francis Walker in 1862. It is found in the Philippines on Luzon and Mindanao.

The wingspan is about 27 mm.
