= Elachyophtalma semicostalis =

Scientific classification
- Domain: Eukaryota
- Kingdom: Animalia
- Phylum: Arthropoda
- Class: Insecta
- Order: Lepidoptera
- Family: Bombycidae
- Genus: Elachyophtalma
- Species: E. semicostalis

Binomial name
- Elachyophtalma semicostalis Rothschild, 1920

Species of moth

Elachyophtalma semicostalis is a moth in the family Bombycidae. It was described by Walter Rothschild in 1920. It is found on New Guinea.

The wingspan is 48–58 mm. The forewings are thinly scaled with sooty black brown, the basal half with an olive tinge and the basal three-fifths of the costal area orange buff. The basal two-thirds of the hindwings is sooty black brown, the outer two-fifths orange golden.
