= Penicillifera lactea =

Scientific classification
- Domain: Eukaryota
- Kingdom: Animalia
- Phylum: Arthropoda
- Class: Insecta
- Order: Lepidoptera
- Family: Bombycidae
- Genus: Penicillifera
- Species: P. lactea

Binomial name
- Penicillifera lactea (Hutton, 1865)

Synonyms
- Ocinara lactea Hutton, 1865

Species of moth

Penicillifera lactea is a moth in the family Bombycidae. It is found from eastern Afghanistan to India (Assam).

The wingspan is 25–40 mm.
