= Elachyophtalma infraluteola =

Scientific classification
- Domain: Eukaryota
- Kingdom: Animalia
- Phylum: Arthropoda
- Class: Insecta
- Order: Lepidoptera
- Family: Bombycidae
- Genus: Elachyophtalma
- Species: E. infraluteola

Binomial name
- Elachyophtalma infraluteola Rothschild, 1920

Species of moth

Elachyophtalma infraluteola is a moth in the family Bombycidae. It was described by Walter Rothschild in 1920. It is found on New Guinea.

The wingspan is about 51 mm. The forewings are sooty brown black, with a broad curved white band. The basal half (except the costa and the base) of the hindwings is pale golden yellow. The outer half, costa and base are sooty brown black.
