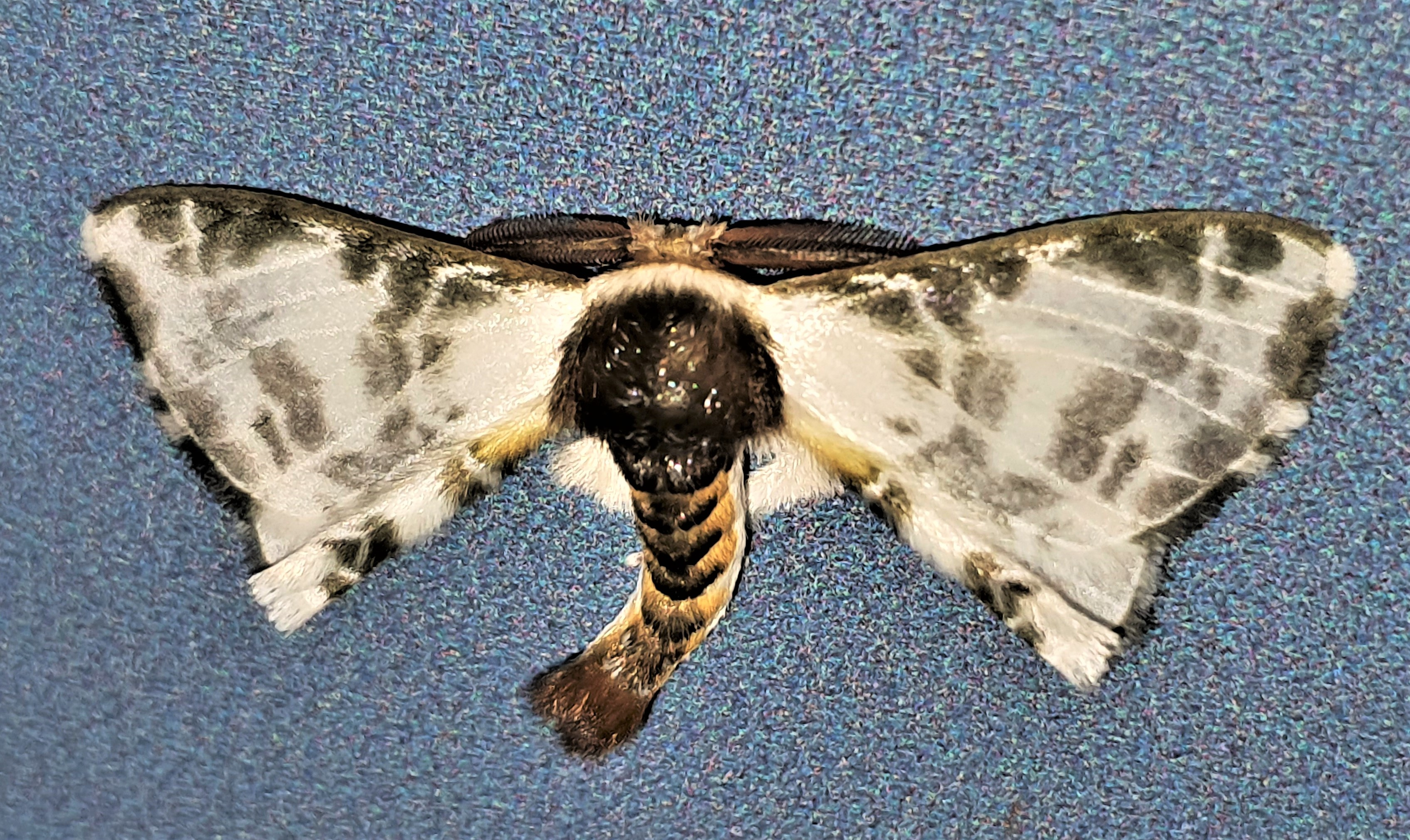

Scientific classification
- Domain: Eukaryota
- Kingdom: Animalia
- Phylum: Arthropoda
- Class: Insecta
- Order: Lepidoptera
- Family: Bombycidae
- Genus: Colla
- Species: C. amoena

Binomial name
- Colla amoena Dognin, 1923

= Colla amoena =

Species of moth

Colla amoena is a moth in the Bombycidae family. It was described by Paul Dognin in 1923. It is found in Brazil.
