= Elachyophtalma fergussonis =

Scientific classification
- Domain: Eukaryota
- Kingdom: Animalia
- Phylum: Arthropoda
- Class: Insecta
- Order: Lepidoptera
- Family: Bombycidae
- Genus: Elachyophtalma
- Species: E. fergussonis

Binomial name
- Elachyophtalma fergussonis Rothschild, 1920

Species of moth

Elachyophtalma fergussonis is a moth in the family Bombycidae. It was described by Walter Rothschild in 1920. It is found on Fergusson Island.

The wingspan is 39–58 mm. The forewings are sooty black grey, with a broad creamy-white curved band. The basal two-fifths of the hindwings is sooty grey black and the outer three-fifths yellow, slightly sprinkled with dark scales.
