= Elachyophtalma dohertyi =

Scientific classification
- Domain: Eukaryota
- Kingdom: Animalia
- Phylum: Arthropoda
- Class: Insecta
- Order: Lepidoptera
- Family: Bombycidae
- Genus: Elachyophtalma
- Species: E. dohertyi

Binomial name
- Elachyophtalma dohertyi Rothschild, 1920

Species of moth

Elachyophtalma dohertyi is a moth in the family Bombycidae. It was described by Walter Rothschild in 1920. It is found on the Tanimbar Islands in Indonesia.

The wingspan is about 37 mm.
