= Racinoa obliquisigna =

Scientific classification
- Kingdom: Animalia
- Phylum: Arthropoda
- Class: Insecta
- Order: Lepidoptera
- Family: Bombycidae
- Genus: Racinoa
- Species: R. obliquisigna

Binomial name
- Racinoa obliquisigna (Hampson, 1910)

Synonyms
- Trilocha obliquisigna Hampson, 1910

Species of moth

Racinoa obliquisigna is a moth in the family Bombycidae. It was described by George Hampson in 1910. It is found in Angola and Kenya.
