= Elachyophtalma mimiocotana =

Scientific classification
- Domain: Eukaryota
- Kingdom: Animalia
- Phylum: Arthropoda
- Class: Insecta
- Order: Lepidoptera
- Family: Bombycidae
- Genus: Elachyophtalma
- Species: E. mimiocotana

Binomial name
- Elachyophtalma mimiocotana Rothschild, 1920

Species of moth

Elachyophtalma mimiocotana is a moth in the family Bombycidae. It was described by Walter Rothschild in 1920. It is found on New Guinea.

The wingspan is about 47 mm. The forewings are pale rufous. The hindwings are pale rufous.
