= Colla aerila =

Scientific classification
- Domain: Eukaryota
- Kingdom: Animalia
- Phylum: Arthropoda
- Class: Insecta
- Order: Lepidoptera
- Family: Bombycidae
- Genus: Colla
- Species: C. aerila

Binomial name
- Colla aerila Schaus, 1929

Species of moth

Colla aerila is a moth in the Bombycidae family. It was described by Schaus in 1929. It is found in Brazil.
