= Epia hiemalis =

Scientific classification
- Domain: Eukaryota
- Kingdom: Animalia
- Phylum: Arthropoda
- Class: Insecta
- Order: Lepidoptera
- Family: Bombycidae
- Genus: Epia
- Species: E. hiemalis

Binomial name
- Epia hiemalis (Butler, 1878)

Synonyms
- Anthocroca hiemalis Butler, 1878

Species of moth

Epia hiemalis is a moth in the Bombycidae family. It was described by Arthur Gardiner Butler in 1878. It is found in the Amazon region.

The forewings are dark purplish brown. The hindwings are olivaceous towards the base.
