= Elachyophtalma insularum =

Scientific classification
- Domain: Eukaryota
- Kingdom: Animalia
- Phylum: Arthropoda
- Class: Insecta
- Order: Lepidoptera
- Family: Bombycidae
- Genus: Elachyophtalma
- Species: E. insularum

Binomial name
- Elachyophtalma insularum Rothschild, 1920

Species of moth

Elachyophtalma insularum is a moth in the family Bombycidae. It was described by Walter Rothschild in 1920. It is found on Roa Island on New Guinea.

The wingspan is about 38 mm. The wings are uniform chocolate rufous, the sides of the abdominal margin of the hindwings with oblique white streaks.
