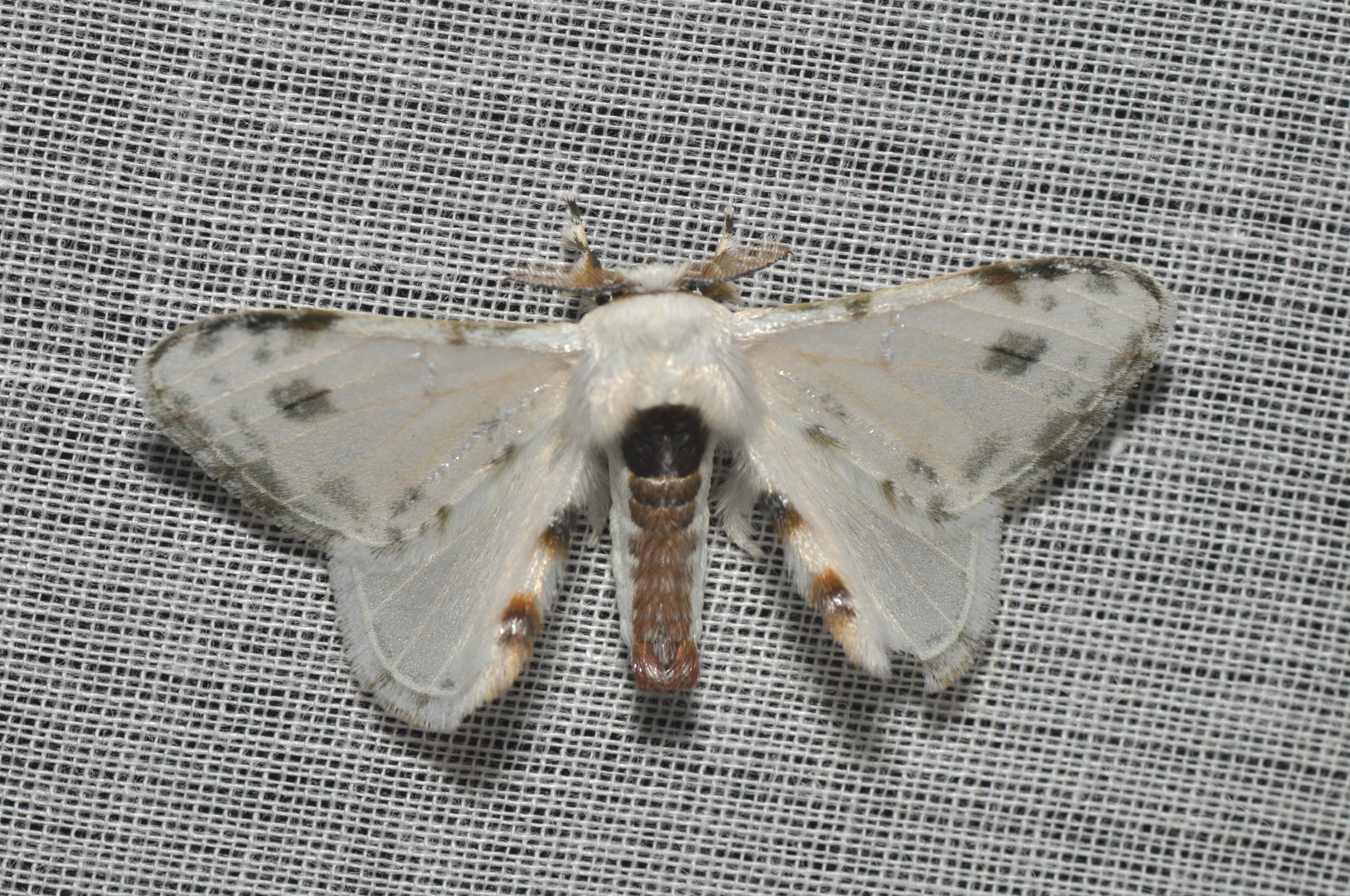
- A Colla opalifera individual

Scientific classification
- Domain: Eukaryota
- Kingdom: Animalia
- Phylum: Arthropoda
- Class: Insecta
- Order: Lepidoptera
- Family: Bombycidae
- Genus: Colla
- Species: C. opalifera

Binomial name
- Colla opalifera Dognin, 1911

Synonyms
- Colla manni Schaus

= Colla opalifera =

Species of moth

Colla opalifera (commonly known as Dognin's greasy roller) is a moth in the family Bombycidae. It was described by Paul Dognin in 1911. It is found in Venezuela, Ecuador, Peru and Brazil. The habitat consists of rainforests and cloudforests where it is found at elevations between 100 and 800 meters.
