= Penicillifera infuscata =

Scientific classification
- Domain: Eukaryota
- Kingdom: Animalia
- Phylum: Arthropoda
- Class: Insecta
- Order: Lepidoptera
- Family: Bombycidae
- Genus: Penicillifera
- Species: P. infuscata

Binomial name
- Penicillifera infuscata Dierl, 1978

Species of moth

Penicillifera infuscata is a moth in the family Bombycidae first described by Wolfgang Dierl in 1978. It is found on Sumatra in Indonesia.
