= Ocinara malagasy =

Scientific classification
- Kingdom: Animalia
- Phylum: Arthropoda
- Class: Insecta
- Order: Lepidoptera
- Family: Bombycidae
- Genus: Ocinara
- Species: O. malagasy

Binomial name
- Ocinara malagasy Viette, 1965

Species of moth

Ocinara malagasy is a moth in the Bombycidae family. It was described by Viette in 1965. It is found in Madagascar.
