= Racinoa ochraceipennis =

Scientific classification
- Domain: Eukaryota
- Kingdom: Animalia
- Phylum: Arthropoda
- Class: Insecta
- Order: Lepidoptera
- Family: Bombycidae
- Genus: Racinoa
- Species: R. ochraceipennis

Binomial name
- Racinoa ochraceipennis (Strand, 1910)

Synonyms
- Ocinara ochraceipennis Strand, 1910

Species of moth

Racinoa ochraceipennis is a moth in the family Bombycidae. It was described by Embrik Strand in 1910. It is found in Malawi.
