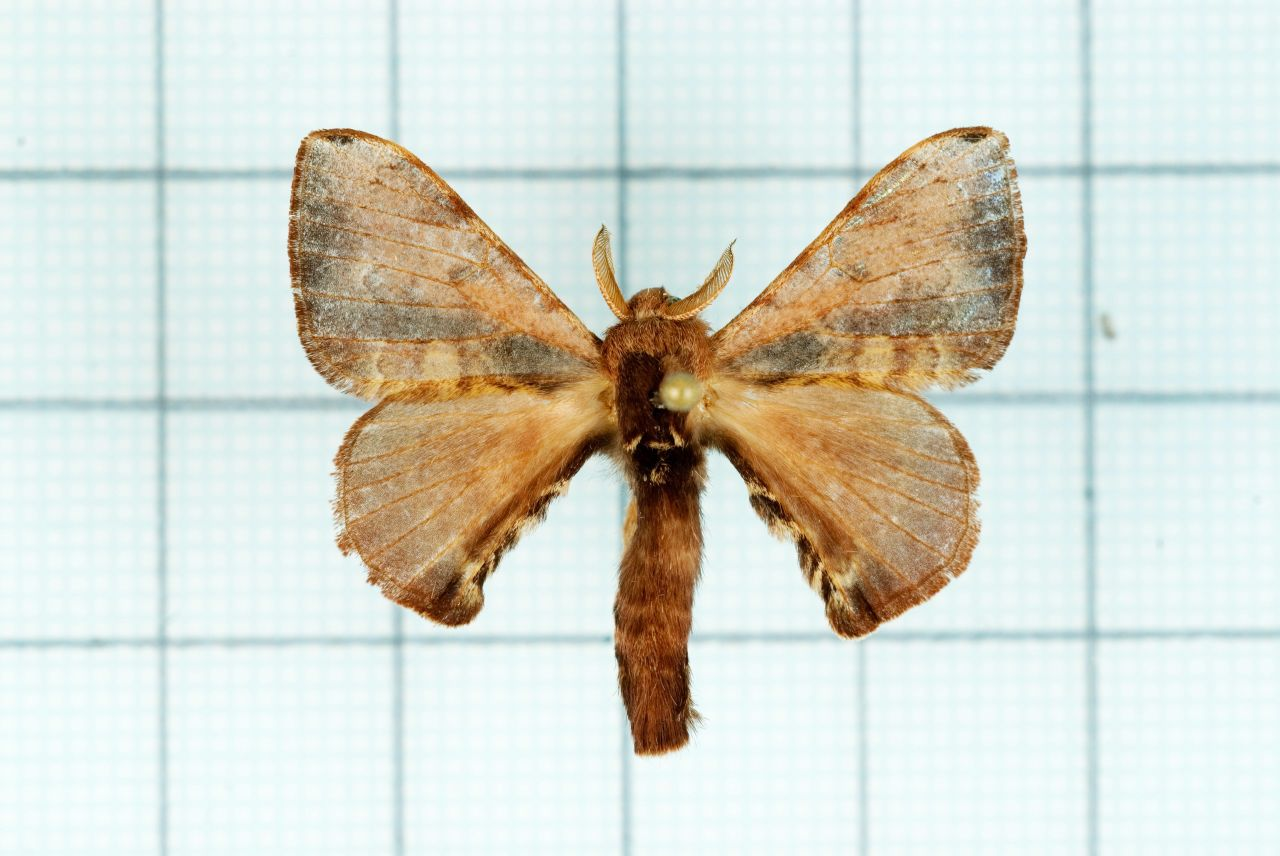

Scientific classification
- Domain: Eukaryota
- Kingdom: Animalia
- Phylum: Arthropoda
- Class: Insecta
- Order: Lepidoptera
- Family: Bombycidae
- Genus: Triuncina
- Species: T. brunnea

Binomial name
- Triuncina brunnea (Wileman, 1911)

Synonyms
- Ocinara brunnea Wileman, 1911; Ocinara diaphragma formosana Mell, 1958

= Triuncina brunnea =

Species of moth

Triuncina brunnea is a moth in the family Bombycidae first described by Alfred Ernest Wileman in 1911. It is found in Taiwan.

The wingspan is 26–28 mm.
