= Amusaron kolga =

Scientific classification
- Kingdom: Animalia
- Phylum: Arthropoda
- Class: Insecta
- Order: Lepidoptera
- Family: Bombycidae
- Genus: Amusaron
- Species: A. kolga

Binomial name
- Amusaron kolga (H. Druce, 1887)

Synonyms
- Norasuma kolga H. Druce, 1887

Species of moth

Amusaron kolga is a moth in the family Bombycidae. It was described by Herbert Druce in 1887. It is found in Cameroon.
