= Colla lilacina =

Scientific classification
- Domain: Eukaryota
- Kingdom: Animalia
- Phylum: Arthropoda
- Class: Insecta
- Order: Lepidoptera
- Family: Bombycidae
- Genus: Colla
- Species: C. lilacina

Binomial name
- Colla lilacina Dognin, 1916

Species of moth

Colla lilacina is a moth in the Bombycidae family. It was described by Paul Dognin in 1916. It is found in French Guiana.
