= Penicillifera tamsi =

Scientific classification
- Domain: Eukaryota
- Kingdom: Animalia
- Phylum: Arthropoda
- Class: Insecta
- Order: Lepidoptera
- Family: Bombycidae
- Genus: Penicillifera
- Species: P. tamsi

Binomial name
- Penicillifera tamsi (Lemée, 1950)

Synonyms
- Ocinara tamsi Lemée, 1950; Ocinara tetrapuncta Chu & Wang, 1993

Species of moth

Penicillifera tamsi is a moth in the family Bombycidae. It is found in Vietnam.
