= Amusaron =

Scientific classification
- Kingdom: Animalia
- Phylum: Arthropoda
- Class: Insecta
- Order: Lepidoptera
- Family: Bombycidae
- Genus: Amusaron; Bouyer, 2008

Type species
- Norasuma kolga Druce, 1887

Genus of moths

Amusaron is a genus of moths of the family Bombycidae. The genus was erected by Thierry Bouyer in 2008.

== Selected species ==
- Amusaron kolga (Druce, 1887)
- Amusaron pruinosa (Grünberg, 1907)
