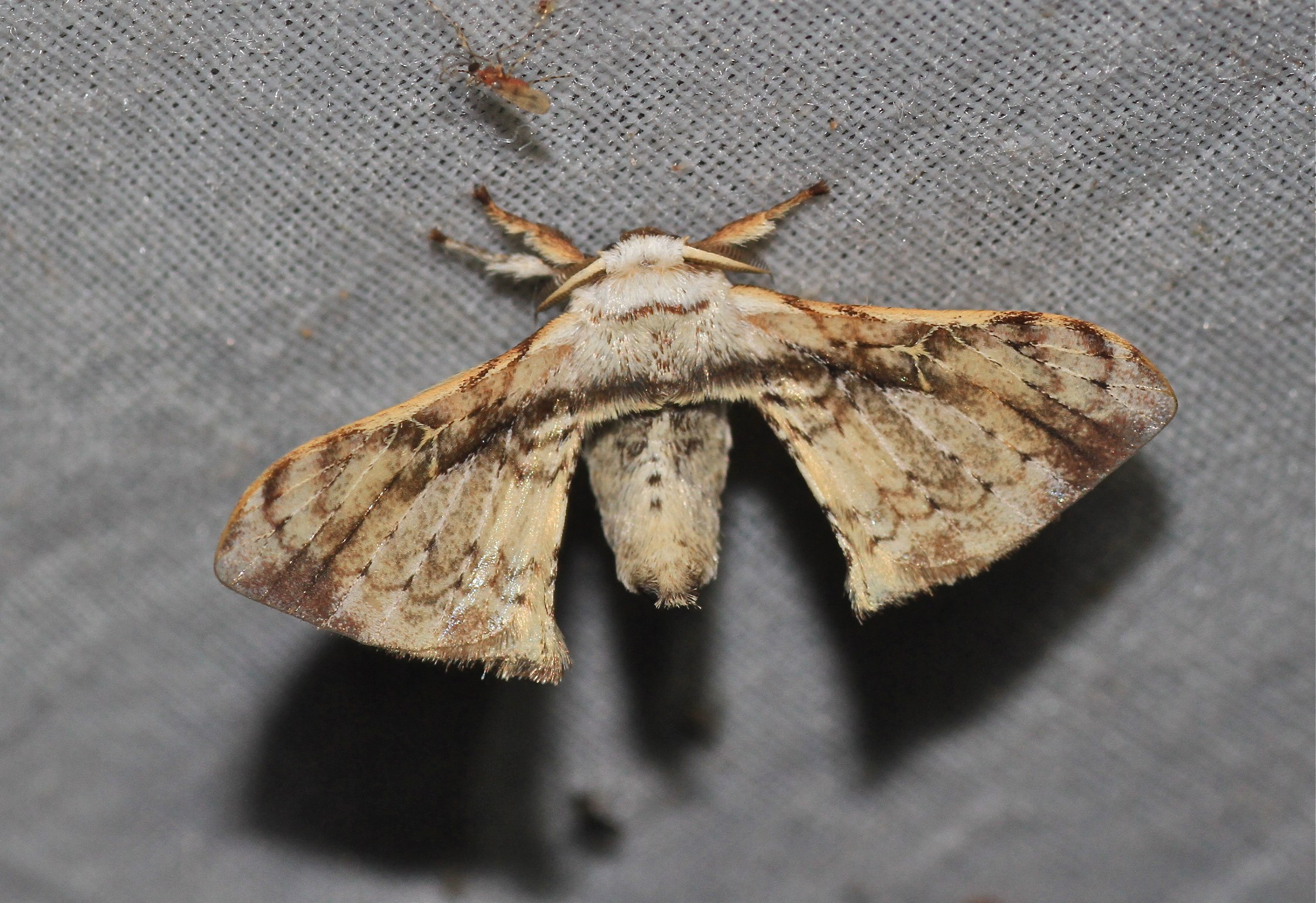
- Ocinara Albicolis

Scientific classification
- Kingdom: Animalia
- Phylum: Arthropoda
- Class: Insecta
- Order: Lepidoptera
- Family: Bombycidae
- Subfamily: Bombycinae
- Genus: Ocinara; Walker, 1856

Type species
- Ocinara dilectula Walker, 1856

Synonyms
- Trilocha Moore, 1860 (disputed); Ernolatia Walker, 1862 (disputed); Chazena Walker, 1869; Naprepa Walker, 1855

= Ocinara =

Genus of moths

Ocinara is a genus of moths of the family Bombycidae. The genus was erected by Francis Walker in 1856.

== Selected species ==
- Ocinara abbreviata Dierl, 1978
- Ocinara albiceps (Walker, 1862)
- Ocinara albicollis (Walker, 1862)
- Ocinara bifurcula Dierl, 1978
- Ocinara dilectula Walker, 1856
- Ocinara ficicola (Ormerod, 1889)
- Ocinara malagasy Viette, 1965
- Ocinara polia (Tams 1935)
