= Vinculinula =

Scientific classification
- Kingdom: Animalia
- Phylum: Arthropoda
- Clade: Pancrustacea
- Class: Insecta
- Order: Lepidoptera
- Family: Bombycidae
- Genus: Vinculinula; Dierl, 1978

Genus of moths

Vinculinula is a genus of moths of the Bombycidae family.

== Species ==
- Vinculinula attacoides Walker, 1862
- Vinculinula diehli Dierl, 1978
