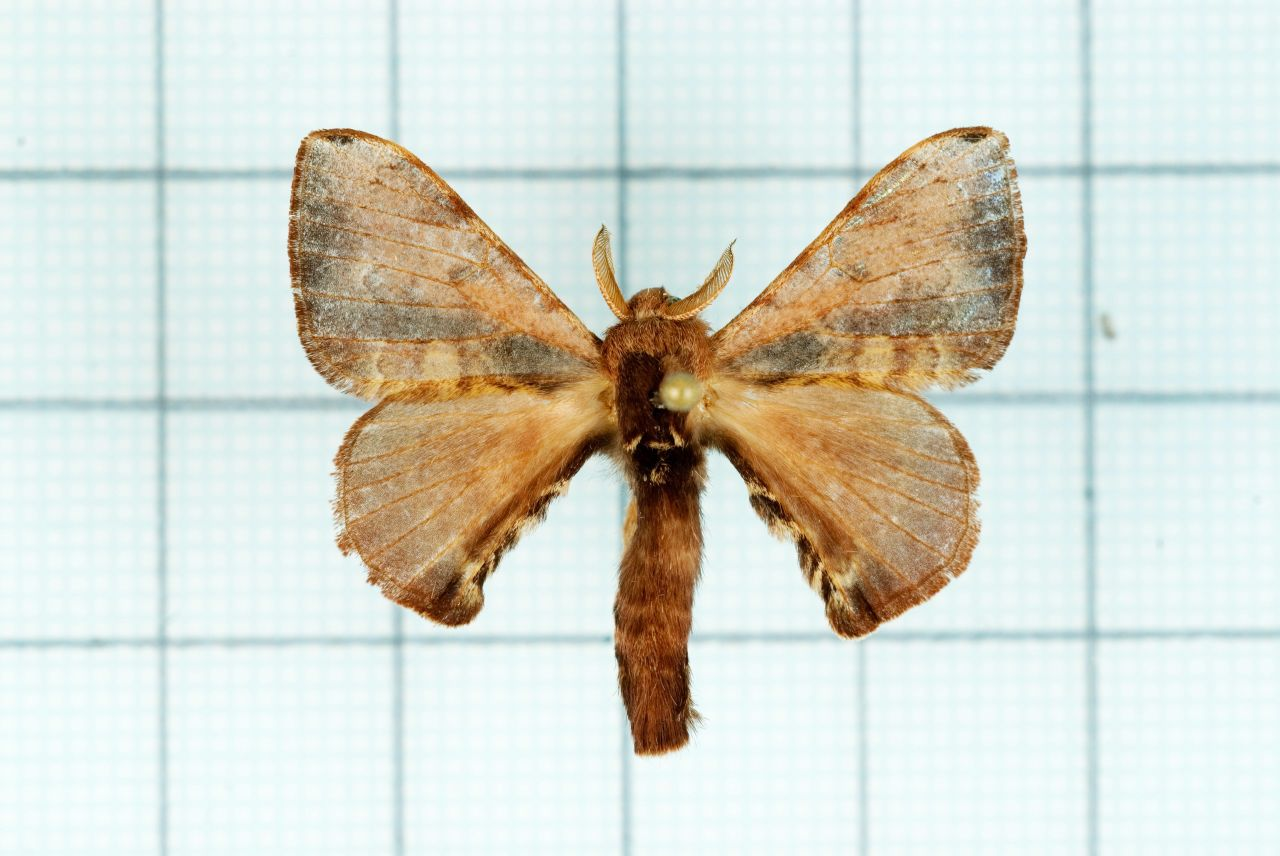
- Triuncina brunnea

Scientific classification
- Domain: Eukaryota
- Kingdom: Animalia
- Phylum: Arthropoda
- Class: Insecta
- Order: Lepidoptera
- Family: Bombycidae
- Genus: Triuncina; Dierl, 1978

Type species
- Trilocha brunnea Wileman, 1911

= Triuncina =

Genus of moths

Triuncina is a genus of moths of the family Bombycidae. The genus was erected by Wolfgang Dierl in 1978.

== Selected species ==
- Triuncina brunnea (Wileman, 1911)
- Triuncina cervina (Walker, 1865)
- Triuncina diaphragma (Mell, 1958)
- Triuncina religiosae (Helfer, 1837)
