= Vingerhoedtia =

Scientific classification
- Kingdom: Animalia
- Phylum: Arthropoda
- Class: Insecta
- Order: Lepidoptera
- Family: Bombycidae
- Genus: Vingerhoedtia; Bouyer, 2008

Type species
- Ocinara ruficollis Strand, 1910

Genus of moths

Vingerhoedtia is a genus of moths of the family Bombycidae first described by Thierry Bouyer in 2008.

== Selected species ==
- Vingerhoedtia grisea (Gaede, 1927)
- Vingerhoedtia ruficollis (Strand, 1910)
