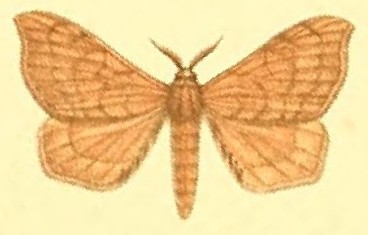
- Racinoa metallescens

Scientific classification
- Kingdom: Animalia
- Phylum: Arthropoda
- Class: Insecta
- Order: Lepidoptera
- Family: Bombycidae
- Genus: Racinoa; Bouyer, 2008

Type species
- Ocinara obliquisigna Hampson, 1910

= Racinoa =

Genus of moths

Racinoa is a genus of moths of the family Bombycidae. The genus was erected by Thierry Bouyer in 2008.

== Selected species ==
- Racinoa albivertex (Strand, 1910)
- Racinoa fuscocervina (Strand, 1910)
- Racinoa ianthe (Druce, 1887)
- Racinoa leucoides (Strand, 1910)
- Racinoa maculifrons (Strand, 1910)
- Racinoa metallescens (Möschler, 1887)
- Racinoa obliquisigna (Hampson, 1910)
- Racinoa ochraceipennis (Strand, 1910)
- Racinoa pallicornis (Strand, 1910)
- Racinoa signicosta (Strand, 1910)
- Racinoa spiralis (Kühne, 2008)
- Racinoa versicolora (Kühne, 2008)
- Racinoa zolotuhini (Kühne, 2008)
