= Moeschleria =

Scientific classification
- Kingdom: Animalia
- Phylum: Arthropoda
- Clade: Pancrustacea
- Class: Insecta
- Order: Lepidoptera
- Family: Bombycidae
- Genus: Moeschleria; Saalmüller, 1890
- Species: M. hulstii

Binomial name
- Moeschleria hulstii Möschler, 1890

Synonyms
- Möschleria Saalmüller, 1890

Genus of moths

Moeschleria is a genus of moths of the Bombycidae family. It contains the single species Moeschleria hulstii, which is found in Puerto Rico.
