= Bivinculata =

Scientific classification
- Kingdom: Animalia
- Phylum: Arthropoda
- Clade: Pancrustacea
- Class: Insecta
- Order: Lepidoptera
- Family: Bombycidae
- Genus: Bivinculata; Dierl, 1978
- Species: B. kalikotei

Binomial name
- Bivinculata kalikotei Dierl, 1978

Genus of moths

Bivinculata is a genus of moths of the Bombycidae family. It contains the single species Bivinculata kalikotei, which is found in Nepal.
