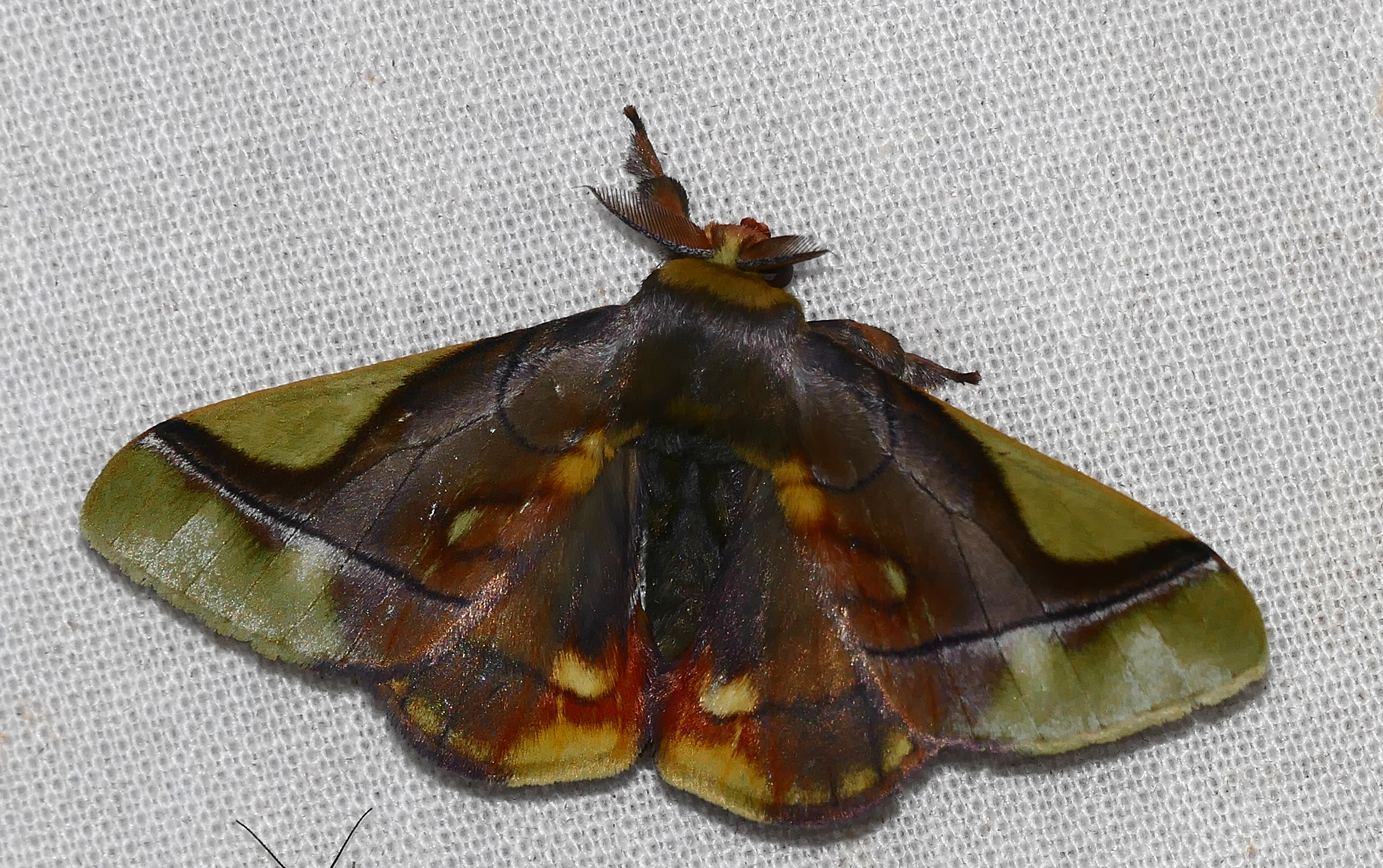
- Epia muscosa

Scientific classification
- Domain: Eukaryota
- Kingdom: Animalia
- Phylum: Arthropoda
- Class: Insecta
- Order: Lepidoptera
- Family: Bombycidae
- Subfamily: Epiinae
- Genus: Epia; Hübner, [1820]

Type species
- Phalaena domina Cramer, [1780]

Synonyms
- Anthocroca Butler, 1878

= Epia (moth) =

Genus of moths

Epia is a genus of moths of the family Bombycidae. The genus was erected by Jacob Hübner in 1820.

== Selected species ==
- Epia casnonia (Druce, 1887)
- Epia domina (Cramer, [1780])
- Epia erdae Schaus, 1928
- Epia hiemalis Butler, 1878
- Epia intricata Druce, 1904
- Epia lebethra Druce, 1890
- Epia lunilinea Schaus, 1920
- Epia madeira Schaus, 1920
- Epia muscosa (Butler, 1878)
- Epia parsenia Schaus, 1934
- Epia picta Schaus, 1920
- Epia vulnerata Felder, 1868

== Former species ==
- Epia amabilis Barnes & McDunnough, 1918
