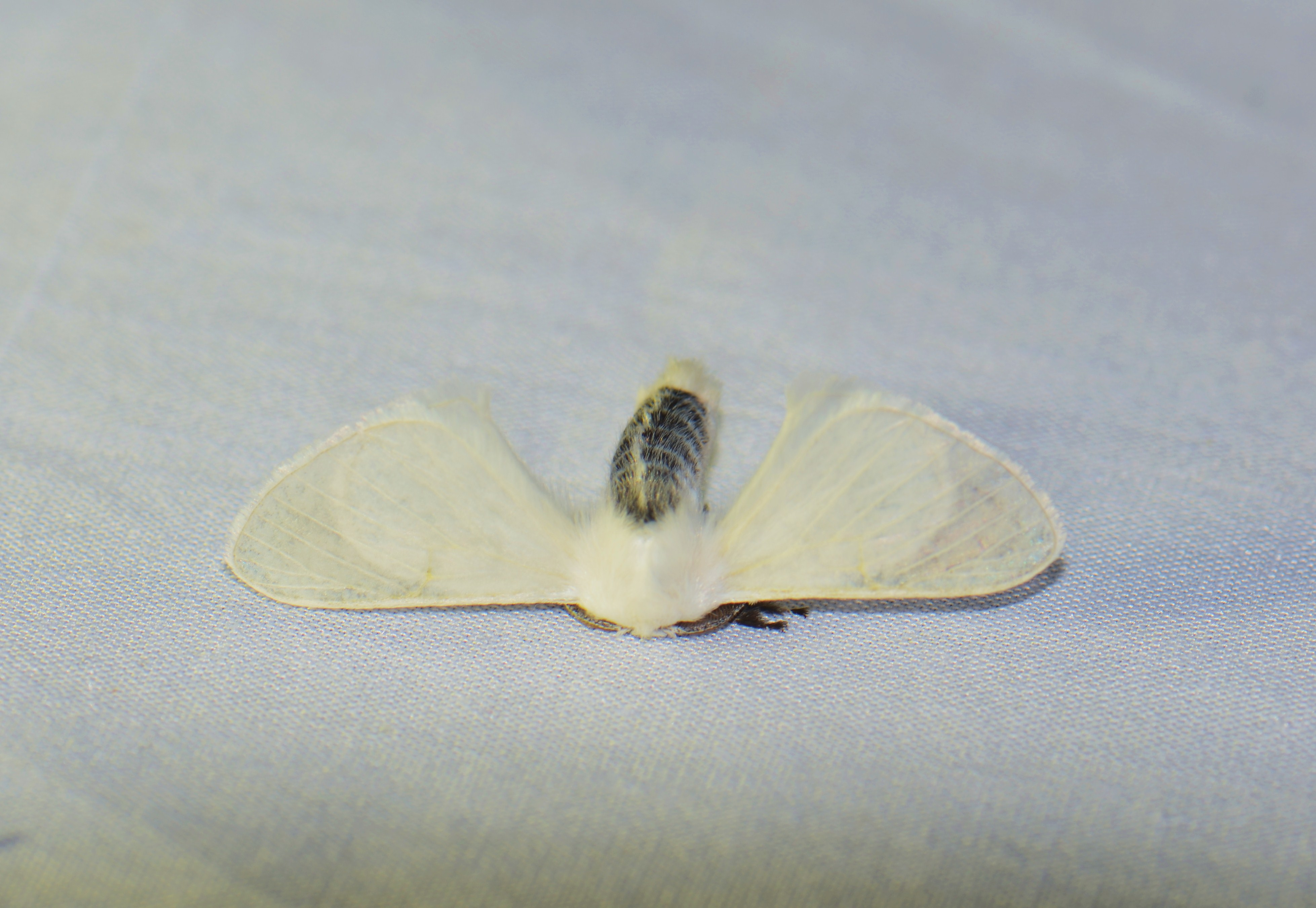
- Gnathocinaria specimen

Scientific classification
- Kingdom: Animalia
- Phylum: Arthropoda
- Class: Insecta
- Order: Lepidoptera
- Family: Bombycidae
- Genus: Gnathocinara; Dierl, 1978
- Species: G. situla

Binomial name
- Gnathocinara situla (van Eecke, 1929)

Synonyms
- Ocinara situla van Eecke, 1929

= Gnathocinara =

Genus of moths

Gnathocinara is a monotypic moth genus of the family Bombycidae erected by Wolfgang Dierl in 1978. It contains only one species, Gnathocinara situla, described by van Eecke in 1929, which is found on Sumatra in Indonesia.

The wingspan is 30–43 mm.
