= Gastridiota =

Scientific classification
- Domain: Eukaryota
- Kingdom: Animalia
- Phylum: Arthropoda
- Class: Insecta
- Order: Lepidoptera
- Family: Bombycidae
- Genus: Gastridiota; Turner, 1922
- Species: G. adoxima

Binomial name
- Gastridiota adoxima (Turner, 1902)

Synonyms
- Andraca adoxima Turner, 1902

Genus of moths

Gastridiota is a monotypic genus consisting solely of Gastridiota adoxima, a moth of the family Bombycidae. The genus was erected by Alfred Jefferis Turner in 1922 but the species had been described by him in 1902 as Andraca adoxima. It is found in the subtropical east of Australia, from the Bunya Mountains and Montville in southern Queensland to north-eastern New South Wales.

The wingspan is about 30 mm.
