= Elachyophtalma =

Scientific classification
- Domain: Eukaryota
- Kingdom: Animalia
- Phylum: Arthropoda
- Class: Insecta
- Order: Lepidoptera
- Family: Bombycidae
- Subfamily: Bombycinae
- Genus: Elachyophtalma; C. Felder, 1861

Type species
- Elachyophtalma tricolor C. Felder, 1861

Synonyms
- Laganda Walker, 1865; Diversosexus Bethune-Baker, 1904

Genus of moths

Elachyophtalma is a genus of moths of the family Bombycidae. The genus was erected by Cajetan Felder in 1861.

== Species ==
- Elachyophtalma bicolor (Bethune-Baker, 1904)
- Elachyophtalma cotanoides Rothschild, 1920
- Elachyophtalma dohertyi Rothschild, 1920
- Elachyophtalma doreyana Rothschild, 1920
- Elachyophtalma fergussonis Rothschild, 1920
- Elachyophtalma flava van Eecke, 1924
- Elachyophtalma flavolivacea Rothschild, 1916
- Elachyophtalma goliathina Rothschild, 1920
- Elachyophtalma infraluteola Rothschild, 1920
- Elachyophtalma insularum Rothschild, 1920
- Elachyophtalma inturbida (Walker, 1865)
- Elachyophtalma kebeae (Bethune-Baker, 1904)
- Elachyophtalma keiensis Rothschild, 1920
- Elachyophtalma meeki Rothschild, 1920
- Elachyophtalma melanoleuca Rothschild, 1920
- Elachyophtalma mimiocotana Rothschild, 1920
- Elachyophtalma picaria Walker, 1865
- Elachyophtalma quadrimaculata van Eecke, 1924
- Elachyophtalma semicostalis Rothschild, 1920
- Elachyophtalma tricolor C. Felder, 1861
