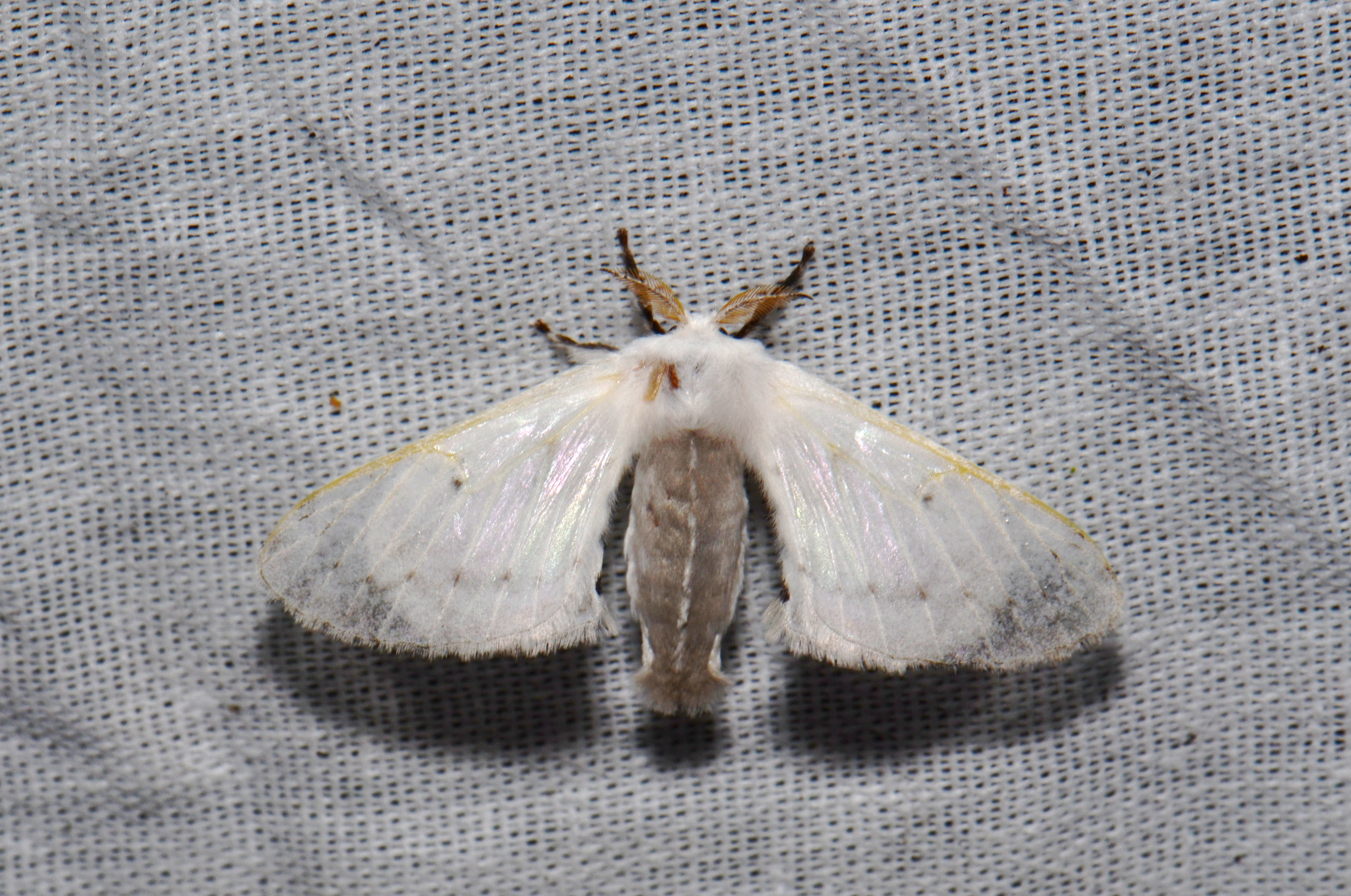

Scientific classification
- Domain: Eukaryota
- Kingdom: Animalia
- Phylum: Arthropoda
- Class: Insecta
- Order: Lepidoptera
- Family: Bombycidae
- Subfamily: Bombycinae
- Genus: Penicillifera; Dierl, 1978

Type species
- Dasychira apicalis Walker, 1862

= Penicillifera =

Genus of insects

Penicillifera is a genus of moths of the family Bombycidae. The genus was erected by Wolfgang Dierl in 1978.

== Selected species ==
- Penicillifera apicalis (Walker, 1862)
- Penicillifera infuscata Dierl, 1978
- Penicillifera lactea (Hutton, 1865)
- Penicillifera tamsi (Lemée, 1950)
