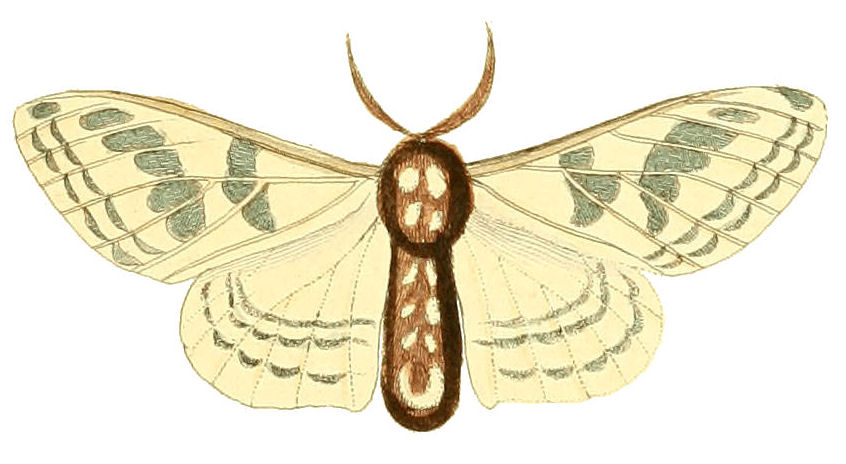
- Colla rhopode illustrated

Scientific classification
- Kingdom: Animalia
- Phylum: Arthropoda
- Class: Insecta
- Order: Lepidoptera
- Family: Bombycidae
- Subfamily: Epiinae
- Genus: Colla; Walker, 1865

Type species
- Colla glaucescens Walker, 1865

Synonyms
- Aza Walker, 1865; Spanochroa Felder, 1874; Prismoptera Butler, 1878; Agriochlora Warren, 1901

= Colla (moth) =

Genus of moths

Colla is a genus of moths of the family Bombycidae. The genus was erected by Francis Walker in 1865.

== Selected species ==
- Colla aerila Schaus, 1929
- Colla amoena Dognin, 1923
- Colla aminula Druce, 1890
- Colla coelestis Schaus, 1910
- Colla gaudialis Schaus, 1905
- Colla glaucescens Walker, 1865
- Colla jehlei Schade, 1939
- Colla klagesi Warren, 1901
- Colla lilacina Dognin, 1916
- Colla micacea (Walker, 1865)
- Colla netrix (Stoll, 1789)
- Colla opalifera Dognin, 1911
- Colla rhodope (Drury, 1782)
- Colla similis Felder, 1868
- Colla umbrata Schaus, 1905
