= Bivincula =

Scientific classification
- Kingdom: Animalia
- Phylum: Arthropoda
- Class: Insecta
- Order: Lepidoptera
- Family: Bombycidae
- Genus: Bivincula; Dierl, 1978

Type species
- Ocinara diaphana Moore, 1879

Genus of moths

Bivincula is a genus of moths of the family Bombycidae. The genus was erected by Wolfgang Dierl in 1978.

== Selected species ==
- Bivincula diaphana (Moore, 1879)
- Bivincula watsoni Dierl, 1978
