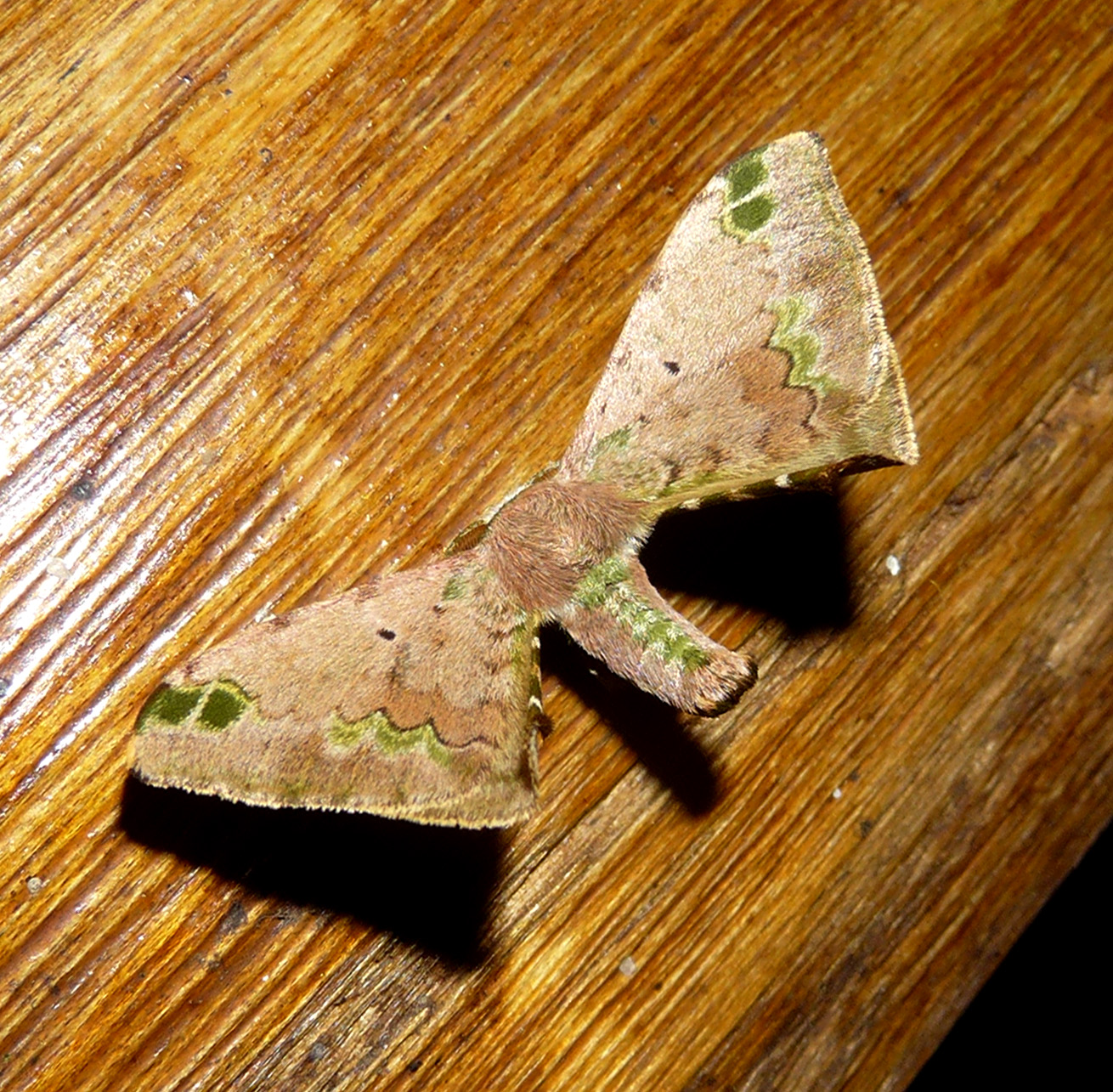
- Anticla antica. Bombycidae (male)

Scientific classification
- Kingdom: Animalia
- Phylum: Arthropoda
- Class: Insecta
- Order: Lepidoptera
- Family: Bombycidae
- Genus: Anticla; Walker, 1855

= Anticla =

Genus of moths

Anticla is a genus of moths of the Bombycidae family.

== Species ==
- Anticla antica Walker, 1855
- Anticla flavaria Cramer, 1781
- Anticla limosa Schaus, 1892
- Anticla ortygia Druce, 1887
- Anticla rutila (Druce, 1887)
- Anticla symphora Schaus, 1929
- Anticla tarasia Schaus, 1929
