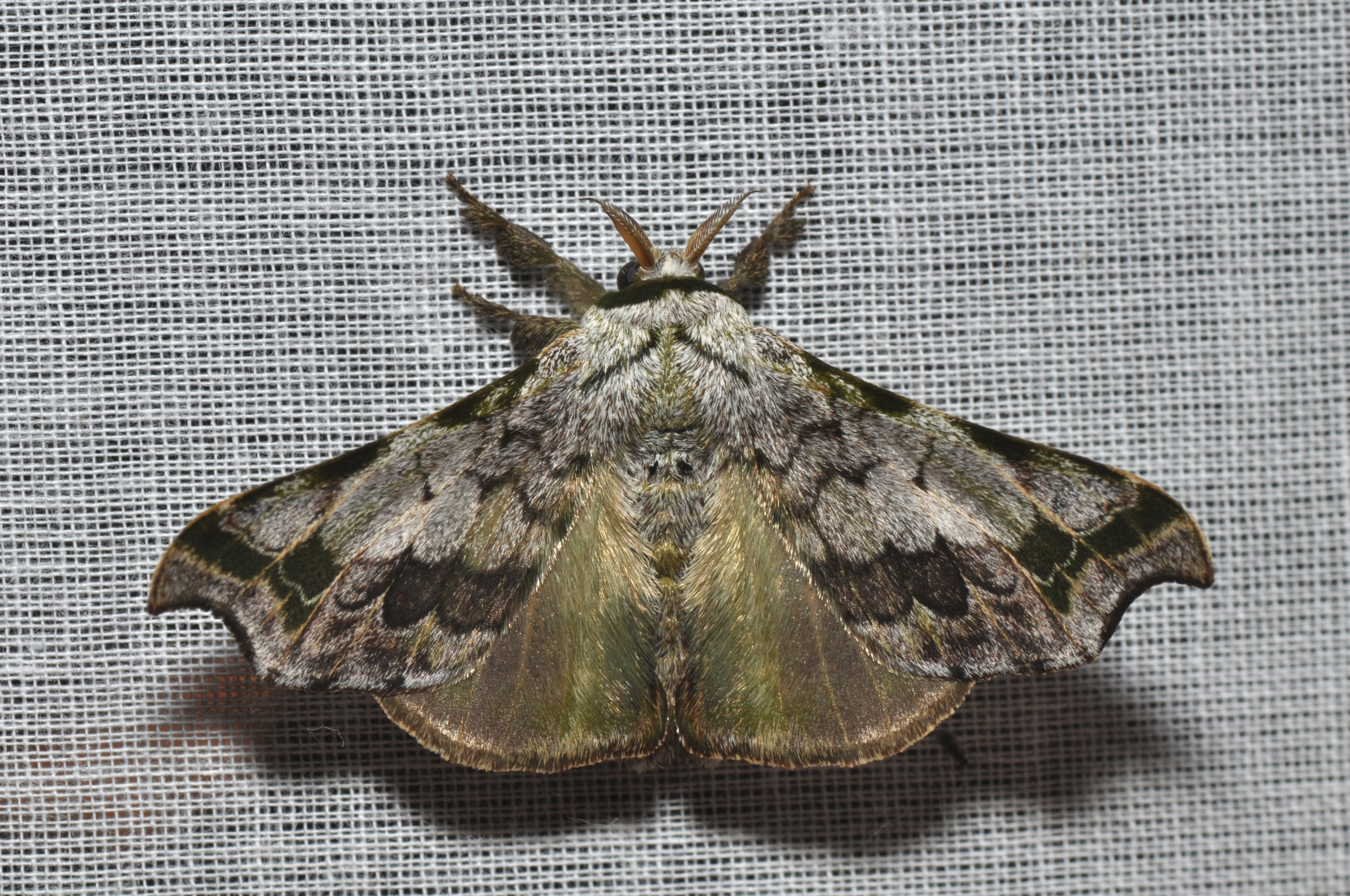
- Quentalia sp.

Scientific classification
- Domain: Eukaryota
- Kingdom: Animalia
- Phylum: Arthropoda
- Class: Insecta
- Order: Lepidoptera
- Family: Bombycidae
- Subfamily: Epiinae
- Genus: Quentalia; Schaus, 1929

Type species
- Pamea vittata Walker, 1855

= Quentalia =

Genus of moths

Quentalia is a genus of moths of the family Bombycidae first described by William Schaus in 1929. It has at times been placed in the family Apatelodidae, but recent research indicates the subfamily Epiinae, to which Quentalia belongs, is affiliated with Bombycidae.

== Species ==
- Quentalia altura Schaus, 1920
- Quentalia amisena Druce, 1890
- Quentalia brunnea Dognin, 1916
- Quentalia callinicia Schaus, 1929
- Quentalia cameloi Schaus, 1939
- Quentalia caulea Schaus, 1929
- Quentalia chromana Schaus, 1929
- Quentalia coarya Schaus, 1929
- Quentalia crenulosa (Dyar, 1918)
- Quentalia demerida Schaus, 1920
- Quentalia denticulata Schaus, 1912
- Quentalia dolorosa E. D. Jones, 1908
- Quentalia drepanoides (Walker, 1866)
- Quentalia eulerufa Schaus
- Quentalia excisa Maassen, 1890
- Quentalia ficus Herrich-Schäffer, 1856
- Quentalia granisca Schaus, 1920
- Quentalia incurvata Dognin, 1922
- Quentalia intranea Dognin, 1914
- Quentalia lapana Schaus, 1920
- Quentalia lapanensis Schaus, 1929
- Quentalia lividia (Druce, 1887)
- Quentalia macerina Schaus, 1929
- Quentalia maevia Druce, 1898
- Quentalia medinara Schaus, 1929
- Quentalia melchthala Schaus, 1929
- Quentalia minasa Schaus, 1929
- Quentalia moratina Schaus, 1929
- Quentalia napima Schaus, 1929
- Quentalia numalia Schaus, 1929
- Quentalia oaxacana Schaus, 1900
- Quentalia ojeda Dognin, 1889
- Quentalia orizava Schaus, 1900
- Quentalia pallida Maassen, 1890
- Quentalia pamina Schaus, 1900
- Quentalia paminella Dognin, 1922
- Quentalia punctilinea Dognin, 1922
- Quentalia purulhana Schaus, 1920
- Quentalia ragna Schaus, 1929
- Quentalia reissi Maassen, 1890
- Quentalia roseilinea Schaus, 1906
- Quentalia secatina Schaus, 1929
- Quentalia sheila Schaus, 1929
- Quentalia subrubicunda Dognin, 1922
- Quentalia subumbrata Dognin, 1922
- Quentalia tolima Dognin, 1922
- Quentalia tremulans Schaus, 1920
- Quentalia veca (Druce, 1887)
- Quentalia viridans Dognin, 1922
- Quentalia vittata (Walker, 1855)
