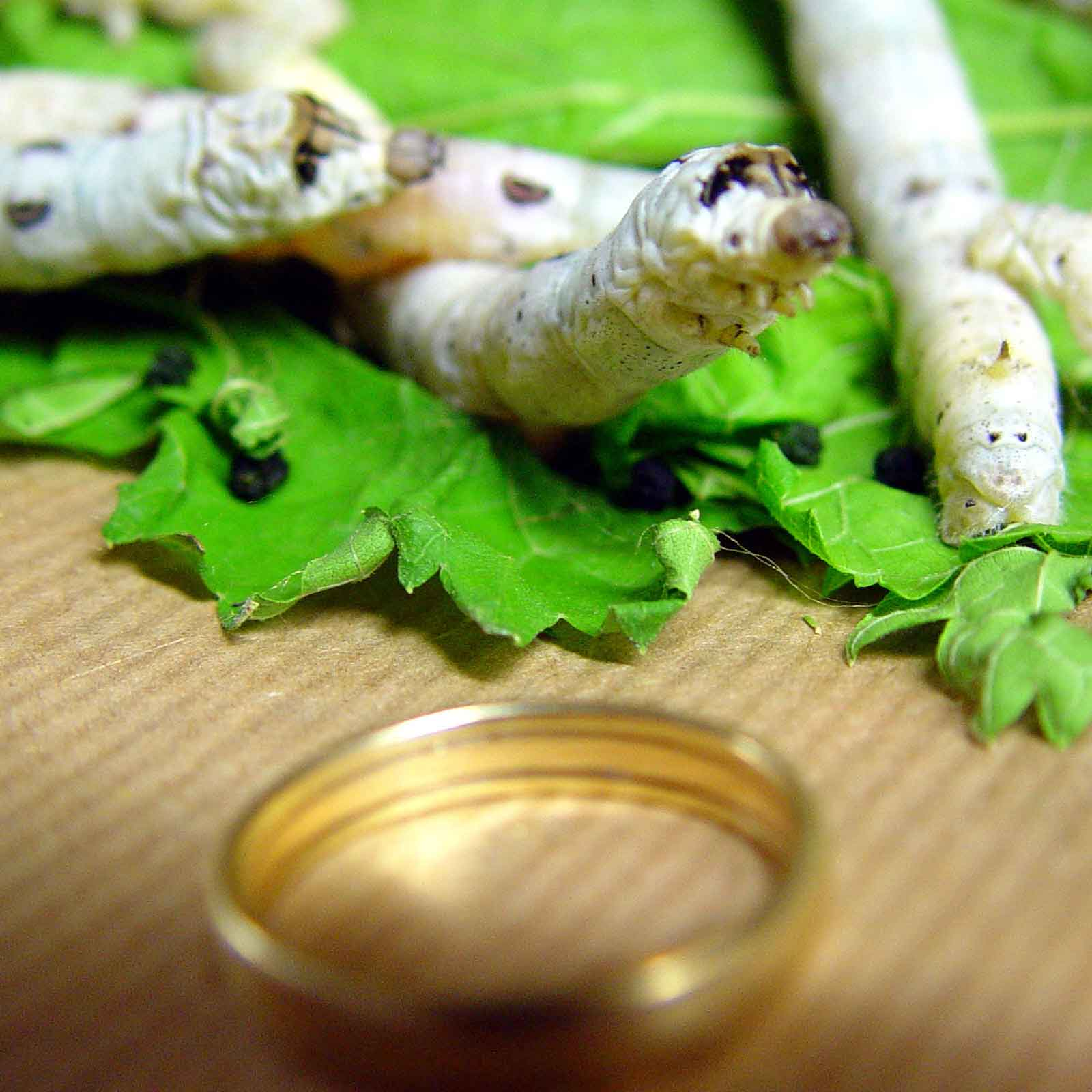
- Caterpillars of the domestic silk moth (Bombyx mori), age 30 days

Scientific classification
- Kingdom: Animalia
- Phylum: Arthropoda
- Clade: Pancrustacea
- Class: Insecta
- Order: Lepidoptera
- Superfamily: Bombycoidea
- Family: Bombycidae; Leach in Samouelle, 1819

Genera
- See text

Synonyms
- Bombycites Latreille, 1809

= Bombycidae =

Family of moths

The Bombycidae are a family of moths known as silkworm moths. The best-known species is Bombyx mori (Linnaeus), or domestic silk moth, native to northern China and domesticated for millennia. Another well-known species is Bombyx mandarina, also native to Asia.

== Taxonomy ==
The family was recently severely restricted, and currently contains only one or two subfamilies, the Bombycinae and Epiinae (previously the tribe Epiini). The former subfamilies Oberthueriinae and Prismostictinae have been placed as subjective junior synonyms of Endromidae. The former subfamilies Apatelodinae and Phiditiinae have been reinstated as separate families.

== Genera ==
This list is provisional. Epia may be placed within Apatelodidae. Some genera were formerly placed in Apatelodinae, such as Anticla and Quentalia.

- Amusaron
- Anticla Walker, 1855
- Bivincula
- Bivinculata
- Bombyx
- Colla
- Dalailama
- Elachyophtalma
- Epia
- Ernolatia
- Gastridiota
- Gnathocinara
- Gunda
- Moeschleria
- Ocinara
- Penicillifera
- Quentalia Schaus, 1929
- Racinoa
- Rondotia
- Trilocha
- Triuncina
- Valvaribifidum
- Vinculinula
- Vingerhoedtia
