= List of moths of Nepal (Bombycidae) =

The following is a list of Bombycidae of Nepal. Fifteen different species are listed.

This list is primarily based on Colin Smith's 2010 "Lepidoptera of Nepal", which is based on Toshiro Haruta's "Moths of Nepal (Vol. 1-6)" with some recent additions and a modernized classification. The genus Mustilia is however placed under the family Endromidae now.

- Andraca angulata
- Bivinculata kalikotei
- Bombyx huttoni
- Bombyx mori Note: It is an exotic species reared only for industrial purposes in silk production. It is native to China.
- Ernolatia moorei
- Gunda ochracea
- Mustilia falcipennis
- Mustilia hepatica
- Mustilia phaeopera
- Mustilia sphingiformis
- Penicillifera lactea
- Prismosticta fenestrata
- Theophoba mirifica
- Trilocha varians
- Triuncina cervina

== See also ==
- List of butterflies of Nepal
- Odonata of Nepal
- Cerambycidae of Nepal
- Zygaenidae of Nepal
- Wildlife of Nepal
