= Oberthueria =

Obertheuria may refer to:

- Oberthueria (beetle), a genus of beetles in the family Carabidae
- Oberthueria (moth), a genus of moths in the family Endromidae
