= Prismosticta tianpinga =

Scientific classification
- Kingdom: Animalia
- Phylum: Arthropoda
- Class: Insecta
- Order: Lepidoptera
- Family: Endromidae
- Genus: Prismosticta
- Species: P. tianpinga

Binomial name
- Prismosticta tianpinga X. Wang, G. H. Huang & M. Wang, 2011

Species of moth

Prismosticta tianpinga is a moth in the family Endromidae first described by Xing Wang, Guo-Hua Huang and Min Wang in 2011. It is found in the Chinese province of Hunan.

The length of the forewings is 16–18 mm for males.

== Etymology ==
The specific name refers to Tianping Mountain which is the type locality.
