= Mustilizans drepaniformis =

Scientific classification
- Kingdom: Animalia
- Phylum: Arthropoda
- Class: Insecta
- Order: Lepidoptera
- Family: Endromidae
- Genus: Mustilizans
- Species: M. drepaniformis

Binomial name
- Mustilizans drepaniformis J. K. Yang, 1995

Species of moth

Mustilizans drepaniformis is a moth in the family Endromidae. It was described by Ji-Kun Yang in 1995. It is found in Zhejiang, China.
