= Mustilizans baishanzua =

Scientific classification
- Kingdom: Animalia
- Phylum: Arthropoda
- Class: Insecta
- Order: Lepidoptera
- Family: Endromidae
- Genus: Mustilizans
- Species: M. baishanzua

Binomial name
- Mustilizans baishanzua Yang, 1995

Species of moth

Mustilizans baishanzua is a moth in the Endromidae family. It was described by Yang in 1995. It is found in China (Zhejiang).
