= Prismosticta microprisma =

Scientific classification
- Kingdom: Animalia
- Phylum: Arthropoda
- Clade: Pancrustacea
- Class: Insecta
- Order: Lepidoptera
- Family: Endromidae
- Genus: Prismosticta
- Species: P. microprisma

Binomial name
- Prismosticta microprisma Zolotuhin & Witt, 2009

Species of moth

Prismosticta microprisma is a moth in the family Endromidae first described by Vadim V. Zolotuhin and Thomas Joseph Witt in 2009. It is found in the Chinese provinces of Guangdong and Guangxi and in Vietnam, Thailand and Cambodia.
