= Oberthueria lunwan =

Scientific classification
- Kingdom: Animalia
- Phylum: Arthropoda
- Clade: Pancrustacea
- Class: Insecta
- Order: Lepidoptera
- Family: Endromidae
- Genus: Oberthueria
- Species: O. lunwan

Binomial name
- Oberthueria lunwan Zolotuhin & Xing Wang, 2013

Species of moth

Oberthueria lunwan is a moth in the Endromidae family. It is found in China (Yunnan) and north-eastern Myanmar.

Adults are on wing in May and June.
