= Mustilia terminata =

Scientific classification
- Kingdom: Animalia
- Phylum: Arthropoda
- Class: Insecta
- Order: Lepidoptera
- Family: Endromidae
- Genus: Mustilia
- Species: M. terminata

Binomial name
- Mustilia terminata Yang, 1995

Species of moth

Mustilia terminata is a moth in the Endromidae family. It was described by Yang in 1995. It is found in China (Guangxi).

The wingspan is about 52 mm. Adults are red-brown and similar to Mustllla orthocosta.
