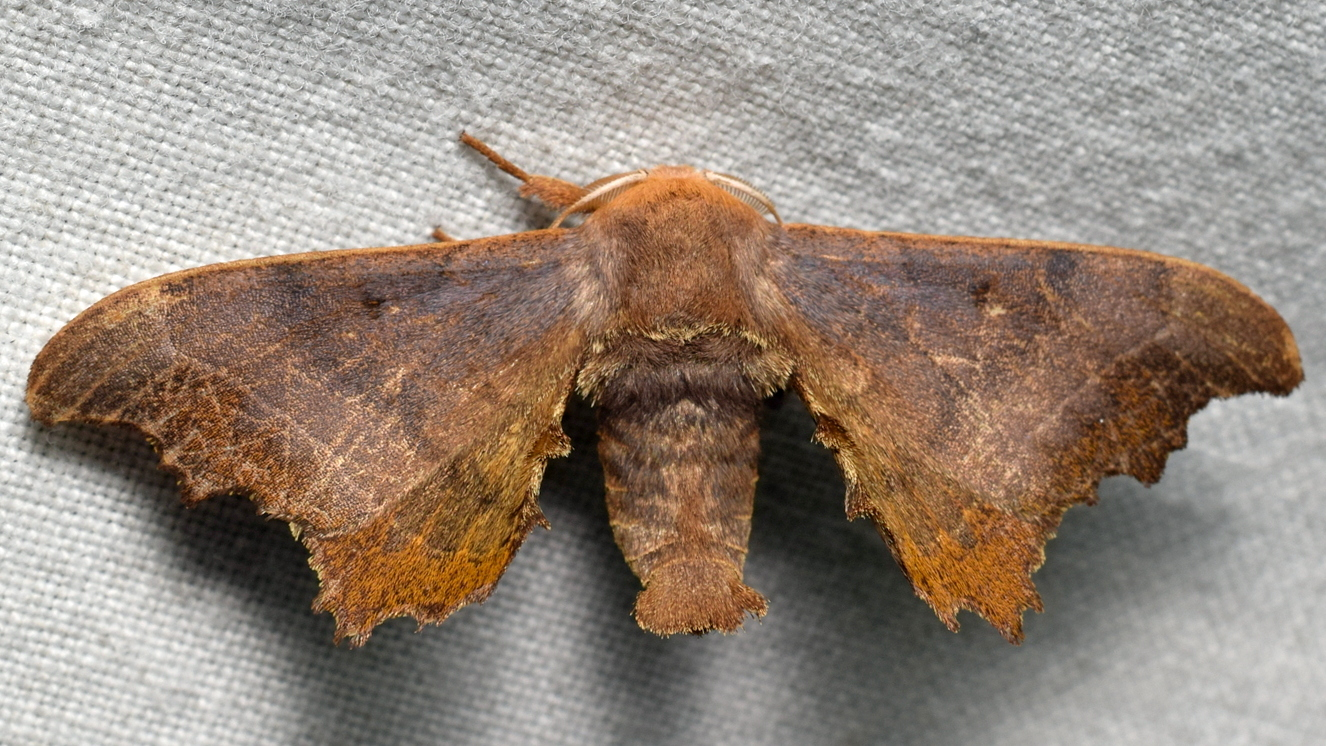

Scientific classification
- Kingdom: Animalia
- Phylum: Arthropoda
- Class: Insecta
- Order: Lepidoptera
- Family: Endromidae
- Genus: Oberthueria
- Species: O. falcigera

Binomial name
- Oberthueria falcigera (Butler, 1878)

Synonyms
- Lagyra falcigera Butler, 1878; Oberthüria caeca ab. rutilans Grünberg, 1911

= Oberthueria falcigera =

Species of moth

Oberthueria falcigera is a moth in the family Endromidae. It is found in Japan (Hokkaido, Honshu, Shikoku, Kyushu).

The wingspan is 38–46 mm. Adults are on wing from June to late August, probably in two generations per year.

The larvae feed on Acer and Quercus species. They have a peculiar cobra-like thorax and a long anal horn.
