= Mustilia zolotuhini =

Scientific classification
- Kingdom: Animalia
- Phylum: Arthropoda
- Clade: Pancrustacea
- Class: Insecta
- Order: Lepidoptera
- Family: Endromidae
- Genus: Mustilia
- Species: M. zolotuhini

Binomial name
- Mustilia zolotuhini Saldaitis & Ivinskis, 2015

Species of moth

Mustilia zolotuhini is a moth in the Endromidae family. It was described by Saldaitis and Ivinskis in 2015. It is found in China (Sichuan). The habitat consists of mixed mountain forests.

The wingspan is 46–51 mm. Adults have been recorded on wing from the end of August to October.

== Etymology ==
The species is named for Russian lepidopterologist Vadim Zolotuhin.
