= Sesquiluna albilunata =

Scientific classification
- Kingdom: Animalia
- Phylum: Arthropoda
- Class: Insecta
- Order: Lepidoptera
- Family: Endromidae
- Genus: Sesquiluna
- Species: S. albilunata

Binomial name
- Sesquiluna albilunata (Hampson, 1910)

Synonyms
- Andraca albilunata Hampson, 1910

Species of moth

Sesquiluna albilunata is a moth in the family Endromidae first described by George Hampson in 1910. It is found in Assam, India.

The wingspan is about 40 mm for males and 46 mm for females. The forewings are dark red brown mixed with grey and with a deeper red-brown antemedial band defined by greyish on the inner side and with slightly waved edges, oblique from the costa to the submedian fold. There is an indistinct brown discoidal bar with a grey line in the centre and a waved brownish medial line and waved grey postmedial line with a somewhat deeper brown band between them. There are also small obliquely placed subapical white lunules below veins seven and six with a reddish tinge beyond them. The hindwings are red brown with a greyish tinge. There is a small brown discoidal spot and chocolate brown spots on the inner margin before and beyond the middle, with greyish marks beyond them.

The larvae feed gregariously on Cudrania javanicus. They are dull black dusted with grey and with a pale yellow dorsal line and orange subdorsal and lateral lines, as well as two yellow ventral lines. There are broad yellow patches between the prolegs and the head is black.
