= Mustilia castanea =

Scientific classification
- Kingdom: Animalia
- Phylum: Arthropoda
- Class: Insecta
- Order: Lepidoptera
- Family: Endromidae
- Genus: Mustilia
- Species: M. castanea

Binomial name
- Mustilia castanea Moore, 1879

Species of moth

Mustilia castanea is a moth in the family Endromidae. It was described by Frederic Moore in 1879. It is found in Bhutan and Darjeeling, India.
