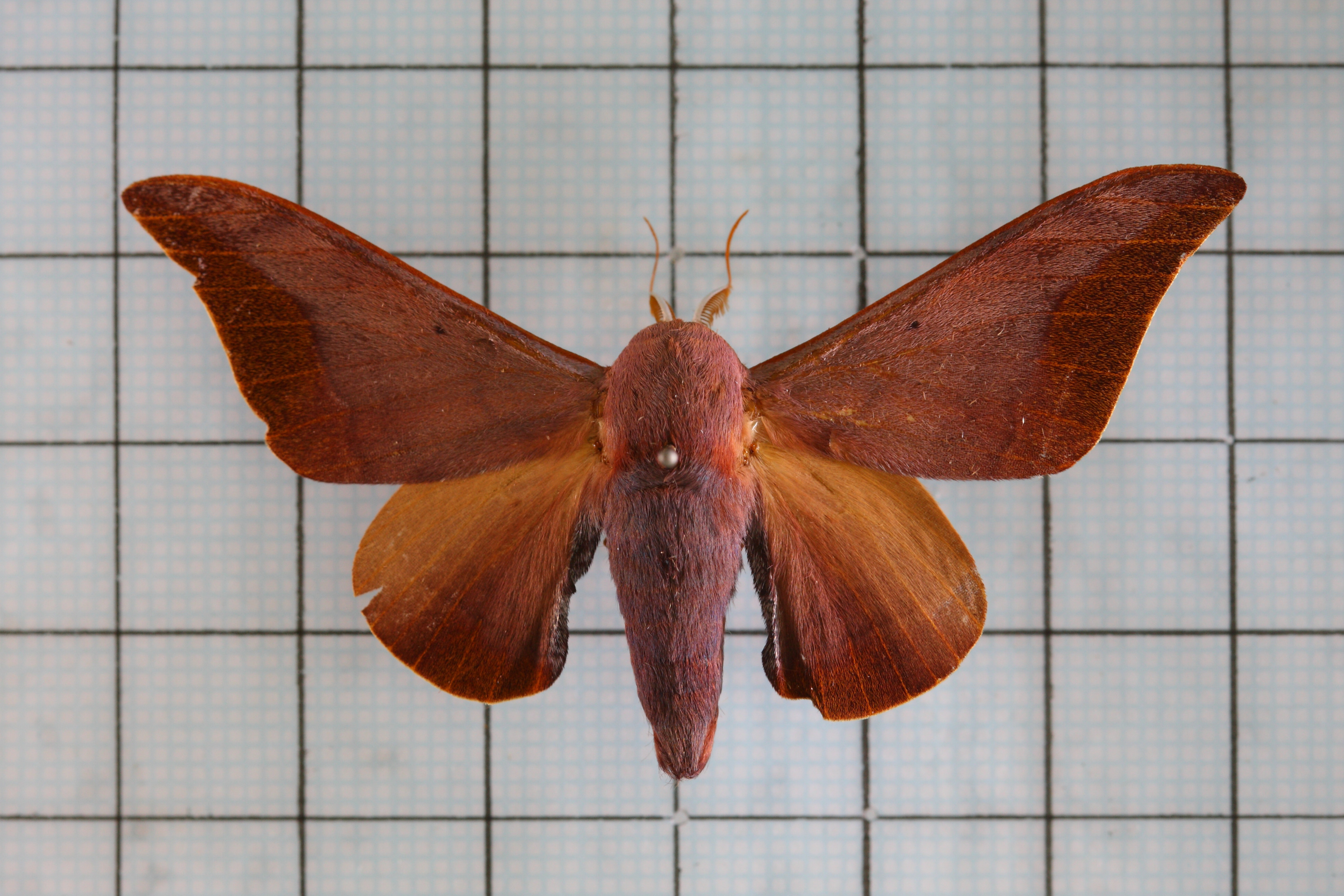

Scientific classification
- Kingdom: Animalia
- Phylum: Arthropoda
- Class: Insecta
- Order: Lepidoptera
- Family: Endromidae
- Genus: Mustilia
- Species: M. sphingiformis
- Subspecies: M. s. gerontica

Trinomial name
- Mustilia sphingiformis gerontica West, 1932

= Mustilia sphingiformis gerontica =

Subspecies of moth

Mustilia sphingiformis gerontica is a subspecies of moth in the family Endromidae. It was first described by West in 1932. It is found in Taiwan.
