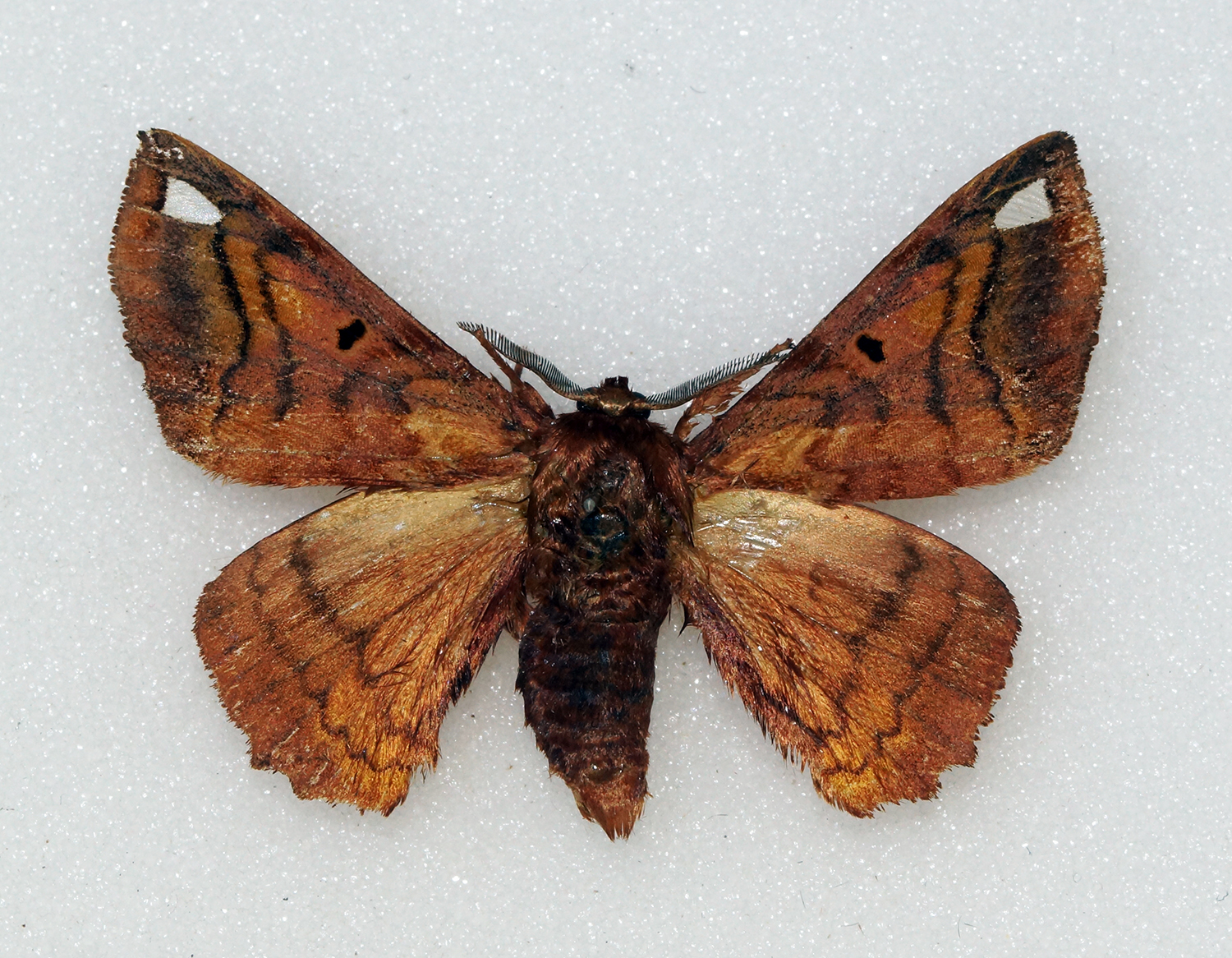

Scientific classification
- Kingdom: Animalia
- Phylum: Arthropoda
- Clade: Pancrustacea
- Class: Insecta
- Order: Lepidoptera
- Family: Endromidae
- Genus: Prismosticta
- Species: P. regalis

Binomial name
- Prismosticta regalis Zolotuhin & Witt, 2009

= Prismosticta regalis =

Species of moth

Prismosticta regalis is a moth in the family Endromidae first described by Vadim V. Zolotuhin and Thomas Joseph Witt in 2009. It is found in the Chinese provinces of Guangdong, Hainan and Fujian and in Vietnam.
