= Mustilia soosi =

Scientific classification
- Kingdom: Animalia
- Phylum: Arthropoda
- Clade: Pancrustacea
- Class: Insecta
- Order: Lepidoptera
- Family: Endromidae
- Genus: Mustilia
- Species: M. soosi

Binomial name
- Mustilia soosi Zolotuhin, 2007

Synonyms
- Smerkata soosi

Species of moth

Mustilia soosi is a moth in the family Endromidae. Described by Vadim V. Zolotuhin in 2007, it is found in Thailand.
