= Mustilizans dierli =

Scientific classification
- Kingdom: Animalia
- Phylum: Arthropoda
- Clade: Pancrustacea
- Class: Insecta
- Order: Lepidoptera
- Family: Endromidae
- Genus: Mustilizans
- Species: M. dierli

Binomial name
- Mustilizans dierli (Holloway, 1987)

Synonyms
- Mustilia dierli Holloway, 1987

Species of moth

Mustilizans dierli is a moth in the family Endromidae. It was described by Jeremy Daniel Holloway in 1987. It is found on Borneo and in Yunnan, China. It is found at elevations ranging from lowlands to 2,000 meters.

The forewing length is 25–28 mm.

== Subspecies ==
- Mustilizans dierli dierli (Borneo)
- Mustilizans dierli refugialis Zolotuhin, 2007 (China: Yunnan)
