= Sesquiluna forbesi =

Scientific classification
- Kingdom: Animalia
- Phylum: Arthropoda
- Clade: Pancrustacea
- Class: Insecta
- Order: Lepidoptera
- Family: Endromidae
- Genus: Sesquiluna
- Species: S. forbesi

Binomial name
- Sesquiluna forbesi Zolotuhin & Witt, 2009

Species of moth

Sesquiluna forbesi is a moth in the Endromidae family. It is found in Vietnam.
