= Mustilizans sinjaevi =

Scientific classification
- Kingdom: Animalia
- Phylum: Arthropoda
- Clade: Pancrustacea
- Class: Insecta
- Order: Lepidoptera
- Family: Endromidae
- Genus: Mustilizans
- Species: M. sinjaevi

Binomial name
- Mustilizans sinjaevi Zolotuhin, 2007

Species of moth

Mustilizans sinjaevi is a moth in the family Endromidae. It was described by Vadim V. Zolotuhin in 2007. It is found in Vietnam.
