= Mustilia attacina =

Scientific classification
- Kingdom: Animalia
- Phylum: Arthropoda
- Clade: Pancrustacea
- Class: Insecta
- Order: Lepidoptera
- Family: Endromidae
- Genus: Mustilia
- Species: M. attacina

Binomial name
- Mustilia attacina Zolotuhin, 2007

Species of moth

Mustilia attacina is a moth in the family Endromidae. It was described by Vadim V. Zolotuhin in 2007. It is found in Sichuan, China.
