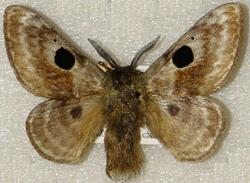

Scientific classification
- Kingdom: Animalia
- Phylum: Arthropoda
- Class: Insecta
- Order: Lepidoptera
- Family: Endromidae
- Genus: Mirina
- Species: M. fenzeli

Binomial name
- Mirina fenzeli Mell, 1938

= Mirina fenzeli =

Species of moth

Mirina fenzeli is a moth of the family Endromidae. It is found from Sichuan to the mountains of central China.
