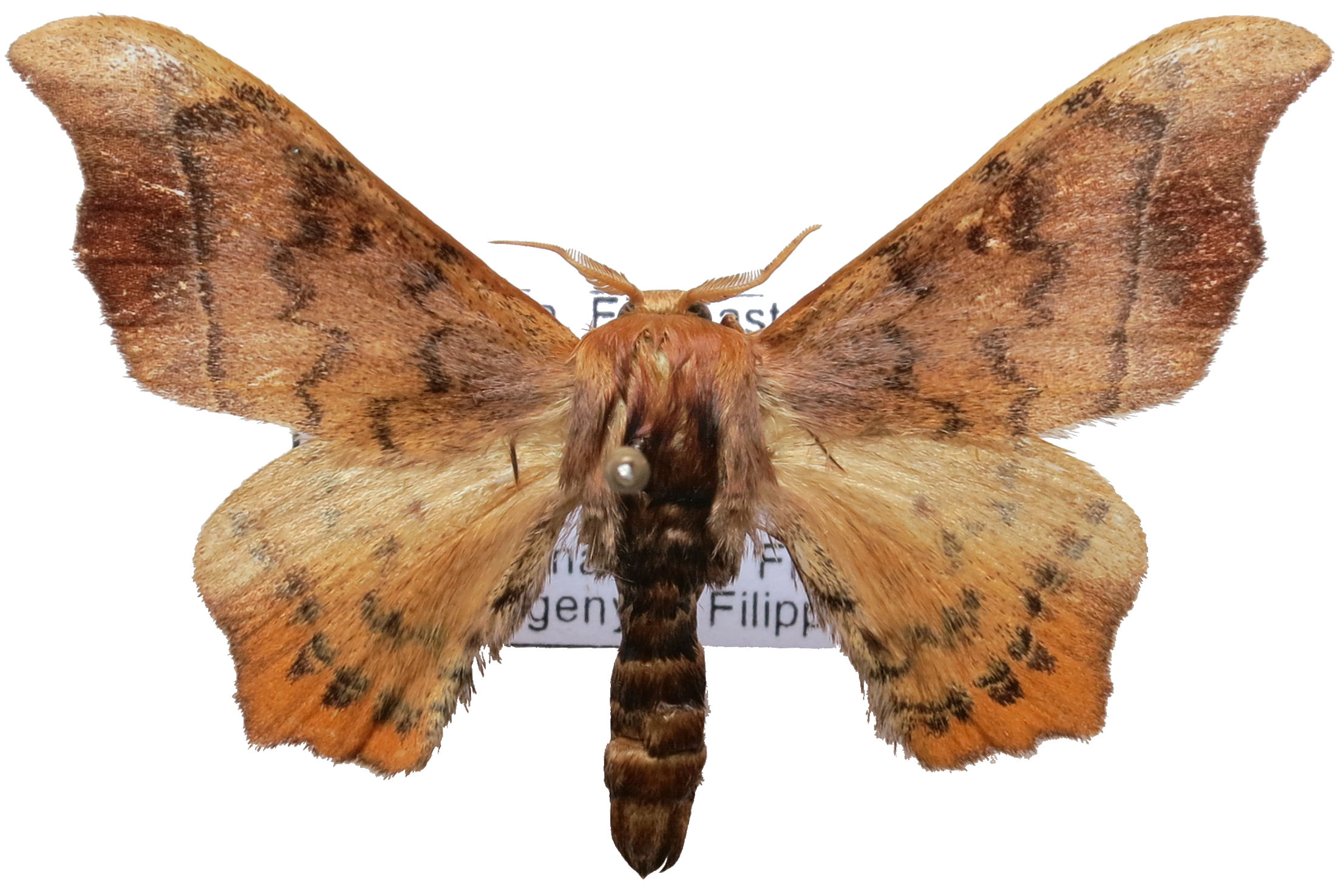
- O. caeca from Uldura Mts, Birofeld, Russia

Scientific classification
- Kingdom: Animalia
- Phylum: Arthropoda
- Clade: Pancrustacea
- Class: Insecta
- Order: Lepidoptera
- Family: Endromidae
- Genus: Oberthueria
- Species: O. caeca

Binomial name
- Oberthueria caeca (Oberthür, 1880)

Synonyms
- Euphranor caeca Oberthür, 1880

= Oberthueria caeca =

Species of moth

Oberthueria caeca is a moth in the Endromidae family. It was described by Oberthür in 1880. It is found in China (Heilongjiang, Jilin, Shaanxi, Henan), Korea and the Russian Far East. The habitat consists of lowland broad-leaved humid forests.

The wingspan is 38–45 mm. Adults are on wing from May to June and again from July to August in two generations per year.

== Caterpillar ==
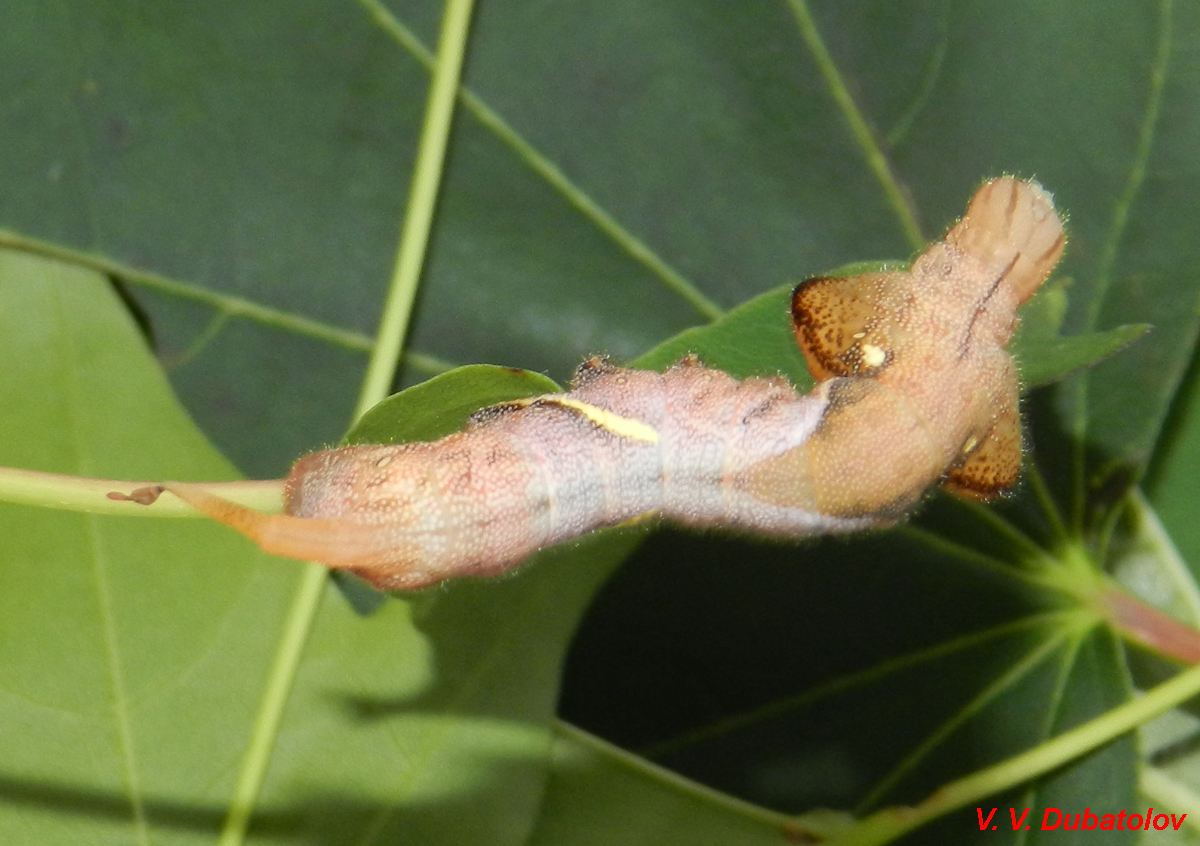
Dorsal view; Khekhtsyr, Khabarovsk env., Russia

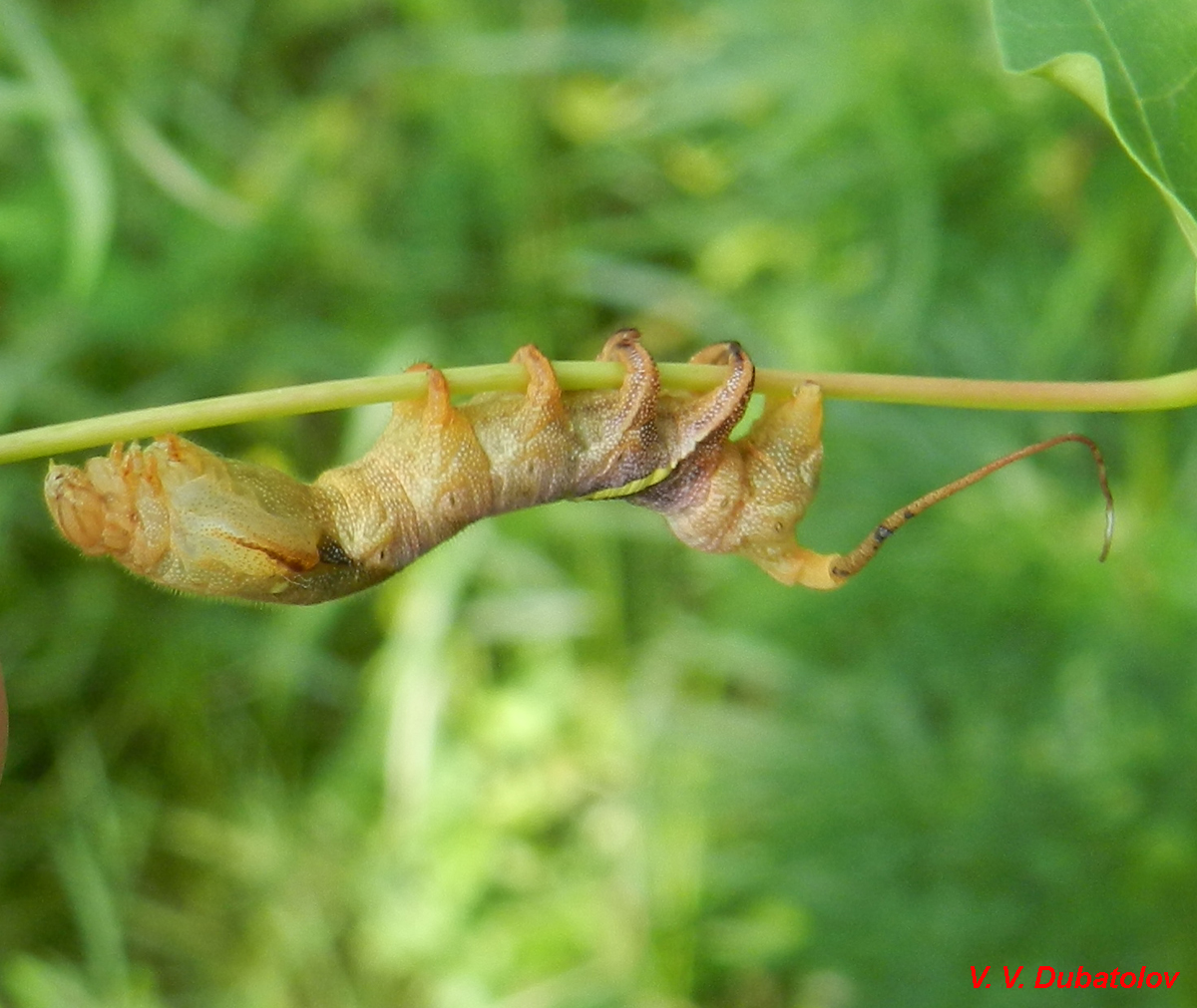
Lateral view; Khekhtsyr, Khabarovsk env., Russia
