= Mustilia columbaris =

Scientific classification
- Kingdom: Animalia
- Phylum: Arthropoda
- Class: Insecta
- Order: Lepidoptera
- Family: Endromidae
- Genus: Mustilia
- Species: M. columbaris

Binomial name
- Mustilia columbaris Butler, 1886

Species of moth

Mustilia columbaris is a moth in the family Endromidae. It is found in India.

The wingspan is 64–90 mm. Adults are pale red brown, suffused with grey. The forewings have an indistinct waved antemedial line and a dark spot at the end of the cell. There is also an oblique postmedial line, usually indistinct. The hindwings have an indistinct curved postmedial line.
