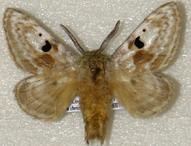

Scientific classification
- Kingdom: Animalia
- Phylum: Arthropoda
- Class: Insecta
- Order: Lepidoptera
- Family: Endromidae
- Genus: Mirina
- Species: M. christophi

Binomial name
- Mirina christophi (Staudinger, 1887)

Synonyms
- Mira christophi Staudinger, 1887

= Mirina christophi =

Species of moth

Mirina christophi is a moth of the family Endromidae. It is found in the Amur region and the Korean Peninsula.

The wingspan is 40–45 mm.
