= Sesquiluna theophoboides =

Scientific classification
- Kingdom: Animalia
- Phylum: Arthropoda
- Clade: Pancrustacea
- Class: Insecta
- Order: Lepidoptera
- Family: Endromidae
- Genus: Sesquiluna
- Species: S. theophoboides

Binomial name
- Sesquiluna theophoboides Zolotuhin & Witt, 2009

Species of moth

Sesquiluna theophoboides is a moth in the Endromidae family. It is found in Vietnam.
