= Oberthueria yandu =

Scientific classification
- Kingdom: Animalia
- Phylum: Arthropoda
- Clade: Pancrustacea
- Class: Insecta
- Order: Lepidoptera
- Family: Endromidae
- Genus: Oberthueria
- Species: O. yandu

Binomial name
- Oberthueria yandu Zolotuhin & Xing Wang, 2013

Species of moth

Oberthueria yandu is a moth in the Endromidae family. It is found in China (Sichuan, Zhejiang, Jiangxi, Fujian and eastern Tibet).

Adults are on wing from late March to early July and again from August to early October in two generations per year.
