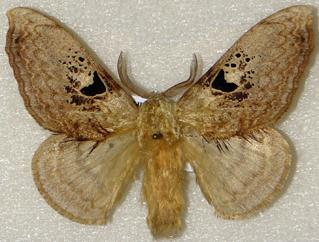

Scientific classification
- Kingdom: Animalia
- Phylum: Arthropoda
- Clade: Pancrustacea
- Class: Insecta
- Order: Lepidoptera
- Family: Endromidae
- Genus: Mirina
- Species: M. confucius

Binomial name
- Mirina confucius Zolotuhin & Witt, 2000

= Mirina confucius =

Species of moth

Mirina confucius is a moth of the family Endromidae. It is found in mountain forests in northern Vietnam, northern Thailand and south-western China.
