= Prismosticta tiretta =

Scientific classification
- Kingdom: Animalia
- Phylum: Arthropoda
- Class: Insecta
- Order: Lepidoptera
- Family: Endromidae
- Genus: Prismosticta
- Species: P. tiretta

Binomial name
- Prismosticta tiretta C. Swinhoe, 1903

Species of moth

Prismosticta tiretta is a moth in the family Endromidae first described by Charles Swinhoe in 1903. It is found in Sundaland, Vietnam, Malaysia, Thailand and Myanmar.
