= Oberthueria jiatongae =

Scientific classification
- Kingdom: Animalia
- Phylum: Arthropoda
- Clade: Pancrustacea
- Class: Insecta
- Order: Lepidoptera
- Family: Endromidae
- Genus: Oberthueria
- Species: O. jiatongae

Binomial name
- Oberthueria jiatongae Zolotuhin & Xing Wang, 2013

Species of moth

Oberthueria jiatongae is a moth in the Endromidae family. It is found in China (Shaanxi, Jiangxi, Hubei, Sichuan, Hunan, Guangdong, Hainan).

Adults are on wing from late April to early September in one or two generations per year.
