= Vadim (disambiguation) =

Vadim (Cyrillic: Вадим) is a Slavic masculine given name.

Vadim may also refer to:

- Bademus or Vadim (died 376), Persian martyr and saint venerated in the Eastern Orthodox Church
- Vadim (surname)
- Vadim, a 1910 Russian short film by Pyotr Chardynin
