= Mustilia semiravida =

Scientific classification
- Kingdom: Animalia
- Phylum: Arthropoda
- Class: Insecta
- Order: Lepidoptera
- Family: Endromidae
- Genus: Mustilia
- Species: M. semiravida

Binomial name
- Mustilia semiravida Yang, 1995

Species of moth

Mustilia semiravida is a moth in the Endromidae family. It was described by Yang in 1995. It is found in China (Guangxi).

The wingspan is about 52 mm. The forewings are grey. The hindwings are brownish-yellow, with the inner half red-brown.
