= Mustilizans andracoides =

Scientific classification
- Kingdom: Animalia
- Phylum: Arthropoda
- Clade: Pancrustacea
- Class: Insecta
- Order: Lepidoptera
- Family: Endromidae
- Genus: Mustilizans
- Species: M. andracoides

Binomial name
- Mustilizans andracoides Zolotuhin, 2007

Synonyms
- Promustilia andracoides Zolotuhin, 2007

Species of moth

Mustilizans andracoides is a moth in the Endromidae family. It was described by Vadim V. Zolotuhin in 2007. It is found in Yunnan, China.
