= Mustilizans shennongi =

Scientific classification
- Kingdom: Animalia
- Phylum: Arthropoda
- Class: Insecta
- Order: Lepidoptera
- Family: Endromidae
- Genus: Mustilizans
- Species: M. shennongi

Binomial name
- Mustilizans shennongi Yang & Mao, 1995

Species of moth

Mustilizans shennongi is a moth in the family Endromidae. It was described by Yang Jikun and Mao Xiaoyuan in 1995. It is found in Hubei, China.
