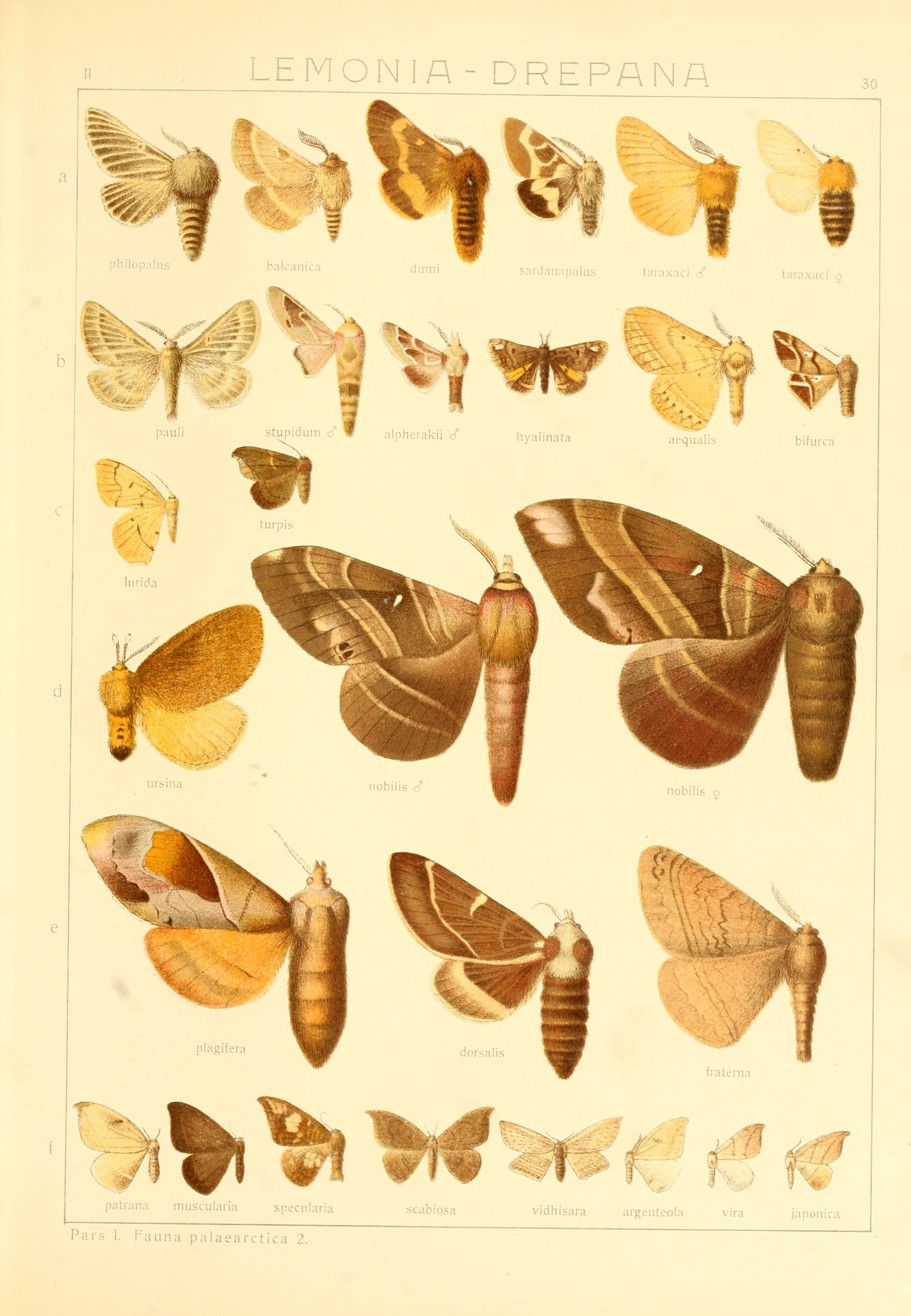
- In Adalbert Seitz's Die Großschmetterlinge der Erde

Scientific classification
- Kingdom: Animalia
- Phylum: Arthropoda
- Class: Insecta
- Order: Lepidoptera
- Family: Endromidae
- Genus: Prismosticta
- Species: P. hyalinata

Binomial name
- Prismosticta hyalinata Butler, 1885

Synonyms
- Apha hyalinata

= Prismosticta hyalinata =

Species of moth

Prismosticta hyalinata is a moth in the family Endromidae first described by Arthur Gardiner Butler in 1885. It is found in Japanese islands of Honshu, Shikoku and Kyushu.

The wingspan is 27–30 mm. Adults are sexually dimorphic.

The larvae feed on Symplocaceae species.
