= Dalailama bifurca =

Scientific classification
- Kingdom: Animalia
- Phylum: Arthropoda
- Class: Insecta
- Order: Lepidoptera
- Family: Endromidae
- Genus: Dalailama
- Species: D. bifurca

Binomial name
- Dalailama bifurca Staudinger, 1896

Species of moth

Dalailama bifurca is a moth in the Endromidae family. It was described by Staudinger in 1896. It was described from Kuku Noor.
