= Mustilia lieftincki =

Scientific classification
- Kingdom: Animalia
- Phylum: Arthropoda
- Class: Insecta
- Order: Lepidoptera
- Family: Endromidae
- Genus: Mustilia
- Species: M. lieftincki

Binomial name
- Mustilia lieftincki Roepke, 1948

Species of moth

Mustilia lieftincki is a moth in the Endromidae family. It was described by Roepke in 1948. It is found in Indonesia (Sumatra).
