= Mustilia glabrata =

Scientific classification
- Kingdom: Animalia
- Phylum: Arthropoda
- Class: Insecta
- Order: Lepidoptera
- Family: Endromidae
- Genus: Mustilia
- Species: M. glabrata

Binomial name
- Mustilia glabrata Yang, 1995

Species of moth

Mustilia glabrata is a moth in the Endromidae family. It was described by Yang in 1995. It is found in China (Guangxi).

The wingspan is 46–50 mm. The forewings are yellowish-brown with dark brown maculations. The hindwings are orange yellow on one side, and red-brown on the other, with two dark brown lines.
