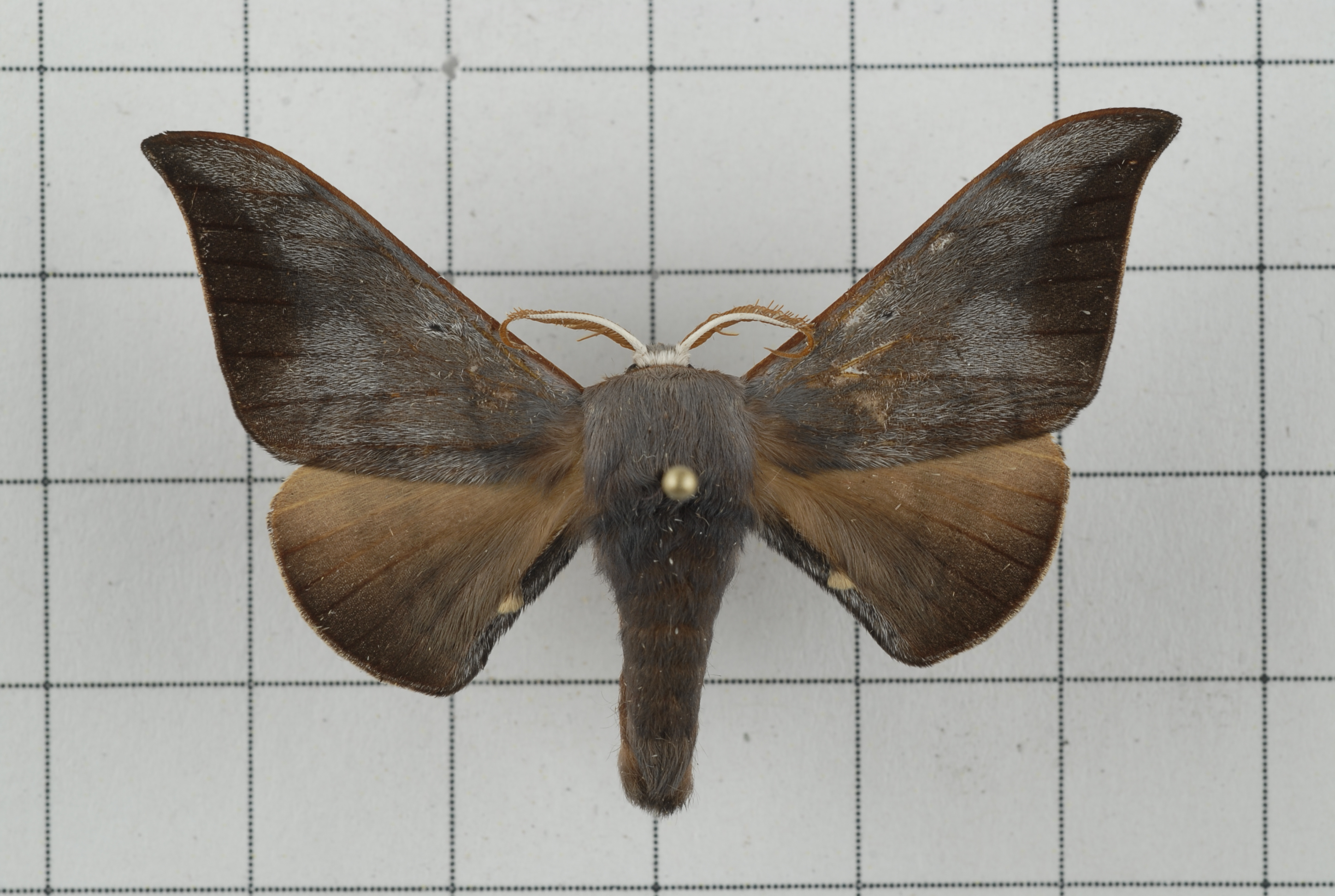

Scientific classification
- Kingdom: Animalia
- Phylum: Arthropoda
- Class: Insecta
- Order: Lepidoptera
- Family: Endromidae
- Genus: Mustilia
- Species: M. fusca

Binomial name
- Mustilia fusca Kishida, 1993

Synonyms
- Smerkata fusca Kishida, 1993

= Mustilia fusca =

Species of moth

Mustilia fusca is a species of moth in the family Endromidae first described by Yasunori Kishida in 1993. It is found in Taiwan.

The larvae feed on the leaves of Trochodendron aralioides. They reach a length of 45 mm when full grown.
