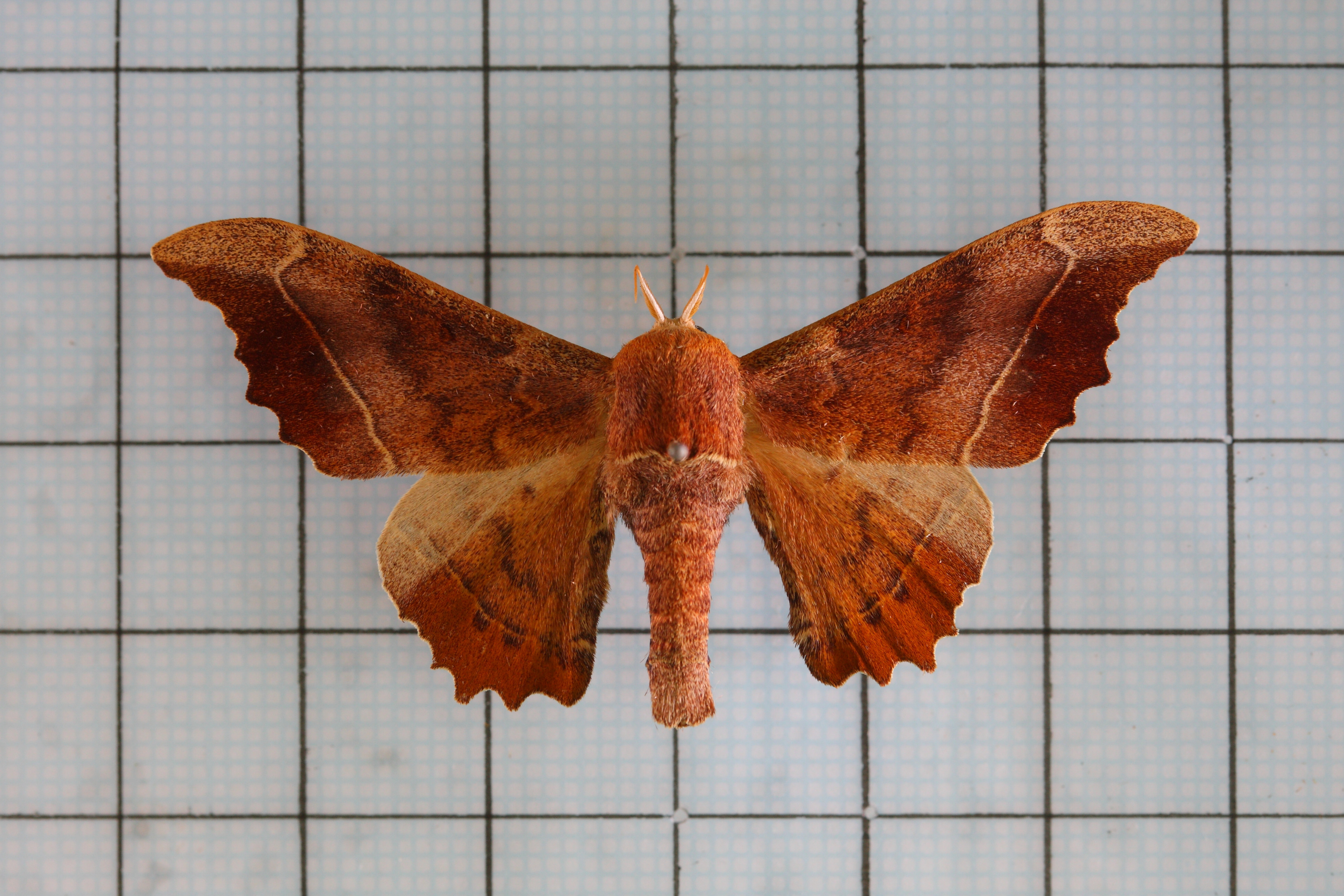

Scientific classification
- Kingdom: Animalia
- Phylum: Arthropoda
- Class: Insecta
- Order: Lepidoptera
- Family: Endromidae
- Genus: Oberthueria
- Species: O. formosibia

Binomial name
- Oberthueria formosibia Matsumura, 1927

= Oberthueria formosibia =

Species of moth

Oberthueria formosibia is a moth in the Endromidae family. It is found in Taiwan. Adults are on wing from late March to early July and again from August to early October in two generations per year.

The larvae feed on Acer species.
