= Mustilia pai =

Scientific classification
- Kingdom: Animalia
- Phylum: Arthropoda
- Clade: Pancrustacea
- Class: Insecta
- Order: Lepidoptera
- Family: Endromidae
- Genus: Mustilia
- Species: M. pai

Binomial name
- Mustilia pai Zolotuhin, 2007

Species of moth

Mustilia pai is a moth in the family Endromidae. It was described by Vadim V. Zolotuhin in 2007. It is found in Shaanxi, China.
