= Ernolatia lida =

Scientific classification
- Domain: Eukaryota
- Kingdom: Animalia
- Phylum: Arthropoda
- Class: Insecta
- Order: Lepidoptera
- Family: Bombycidae
- Genus: Ernolatia
- Species: E. lida

Binomial name
- Ernolatia lida (Moore, 1858)

Synonyms
- Ocinara lida Moore, 1858; Ernolatia signata Walker, 1862

Species of moth

Ernolatia lida is a moth in the Bombycidae family. It is found from Malaysia to Sulawesi.

The moth is 26–44 mm. The ground colour is cream with bright red-brown markings.

The larvae feed on Ficus elastica, Ficus benjamina and Ficus septica.
