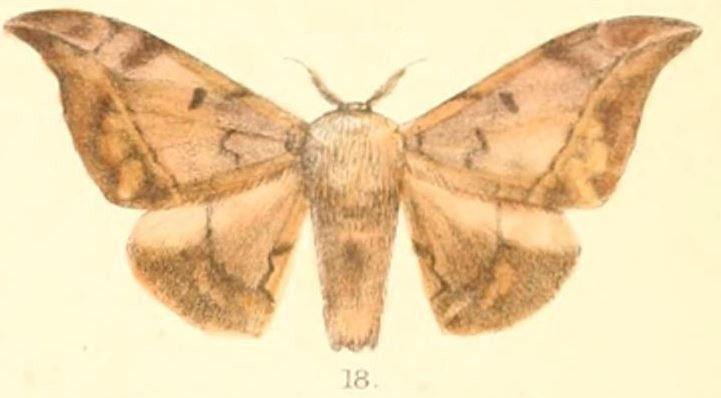

Scientific classification
- Kingdom: Animalia
- Phylum: Arthropoda
- Class: Insecta
- Order: Lepidoptera
- Family: Endromidae
- Genus: Mustilizans
- Species: M. hepatica

Binomial name
- Mustilizans hepatica (Moore, 1879)

Synonyms
- Mustilia hepatica Moore, 1879

= Mustilizans hepatica =

Species of moth

Mustilizans hepatica is a moth in the family Endromidae. It was described by Frederic Moore in 1879. It is found in India, Thailand and Peninsular Malaysia.

== Subspecies ==
- Mustilizans hepatica hepatica (India: Darjeeling)
- Mustilizans hepatica acola Zolotuhin, 2007 (Thailand)
