= Vadim (surname) =

Vadim may be a surname. Notable people with the surname include:

- Annette Vadim, the name of Annette Stroyberg (1936–2005), Danish actress, by first husband, Roger Vadim
- Christian Vadim (born 1963), French actor, son of Roger
- David Vadim (born 1972), Russian actor
- Roger Vadim (1928–2000), French screenwriter, film director and producer

== Fictional characters ==
- Boris Vadim, incarnation of Crimson Dynamo from Marvel Comics

== See also ==
- Dalailama vadim, a moth
