= Prismostictoides =

Scientific classification
- Kingdom: Animalia
- Phylum: Arthropoda
- Clade: Pancrustacea
- Class: Insecta
- Order: Lepidoptera
- Family: Endromidae
- Genus: Prismostictoides; Zolotuhin & T.T. Du, 2011
- Species: P. unihyala

Binomial name
- Prismostictoides unihyala (Zhu & Wang, 1995)

Synonyms
- Prismosticta unihyala Zhu & Wang, 1995

Genus of moths

Prismostictoides is a monotypic moth genus in the family Endromidae. The genus was erected by Vadim V. Zolotuhin and Tran Thieu Du in 2011. Its only species, Prismostictoides unihyala, was described by Zhu and Wang in 1995. It is found in Fujian, China.
