= Pseudandraca =

Scientific classification
- Kingdom: Animalia
- Phylum: Arthropoda
- Class: Insecta
- Order: Lepidoptera
- Family: Endromidae
- Genus: Pseudandraca
- Species: Pseudandraca

Binomial name
- Pseudandraca Miyata, 1970

Synonyms
- Andraca gracilis Butler, 1885

Genus of moths

Pseudandraca is a monotypic moth genus of the family Endromidae erected by Tamotsu Miyata in 1970. The genus was previously placed in the subfamily Prismostictinae of the family Bombycidae. Its only species, Pseudandraca gracilis, was described by Arthur Gardiner Butler in 1885. It is found in Japan.

== Former species ==
- Pseudandraca flavamaculata (J.K. Yang, 1995)
