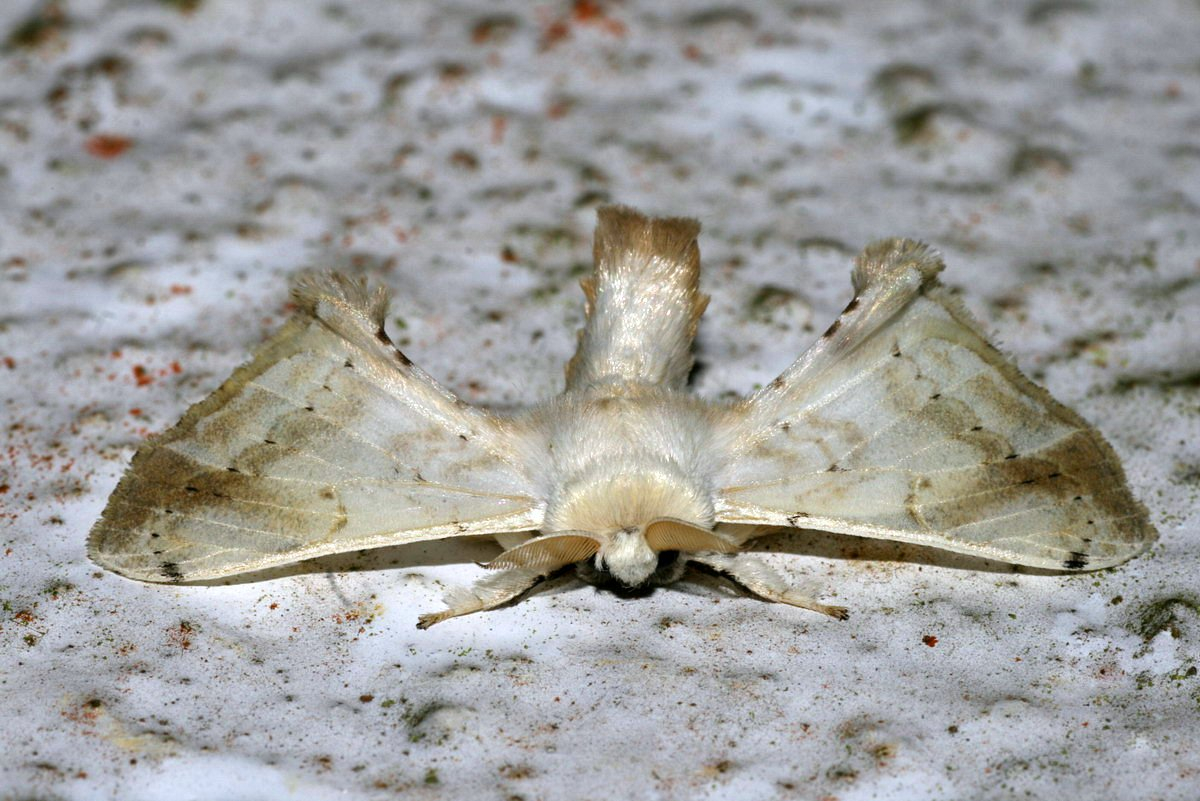
- Ernolatia moorei (Bombycidae)

Scientific classification
- Domain: Eukaryota
- Kingdom: Animalia
- Phylum: Arthropoda
- Class: Insecta
- Order: Lepidoptera
- Family: Bombycidae
- Genus: Ernolatia; Walker, 1862

Type species
- Ernolatia signata Walker, 1862

= Ernolatia =

Genus of moths

Ernolatia is a genus of moths of the family Bombycidae. The genus was erected by Francis Walker in 1862.

== Species ==
- Ernolatia lida (Moore, 1858)

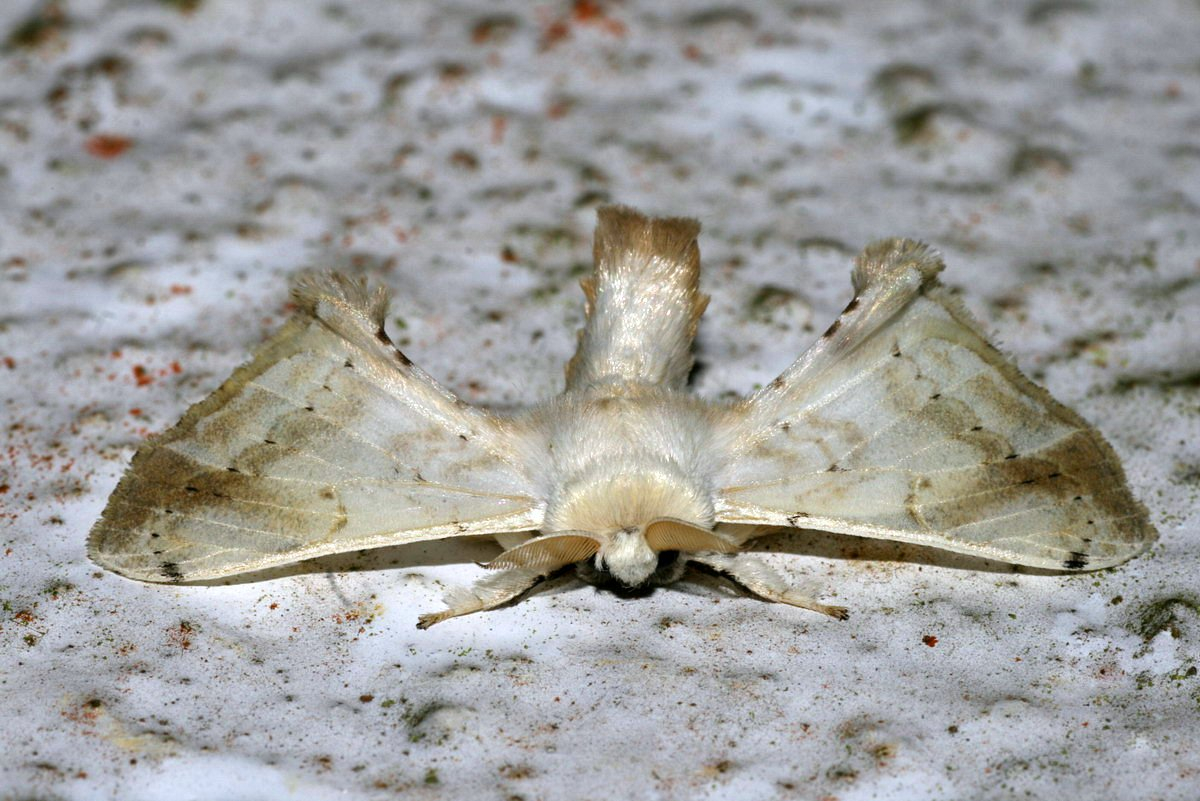
Ernolatia moorei (Bombycidae)

- Ernolatia moorei (Hutton, 1865)
