= Falcogona =

Scientific classification
- Kingdom: Animalia
- Phylum: Arthropoda
- Clade: Pancrustacea
- Class: Insecta
- Order: Lepidoptera
- Family: Endromidae
- Genus: Falcogona; Zolotuhin, 2007
- Species: F. gryphea

Binomial name
- Falcogona gryphea Zolotuhin, 2007

Genus of moths

Falcogona is a genus of moths of the family Endromidae. It contains only one species, Falcogona gryphea, which is found in Vietnam.

== Taxonomy ==
The genus was previously placed in the subfamily Prismostictinae of the Bombycidae family.
