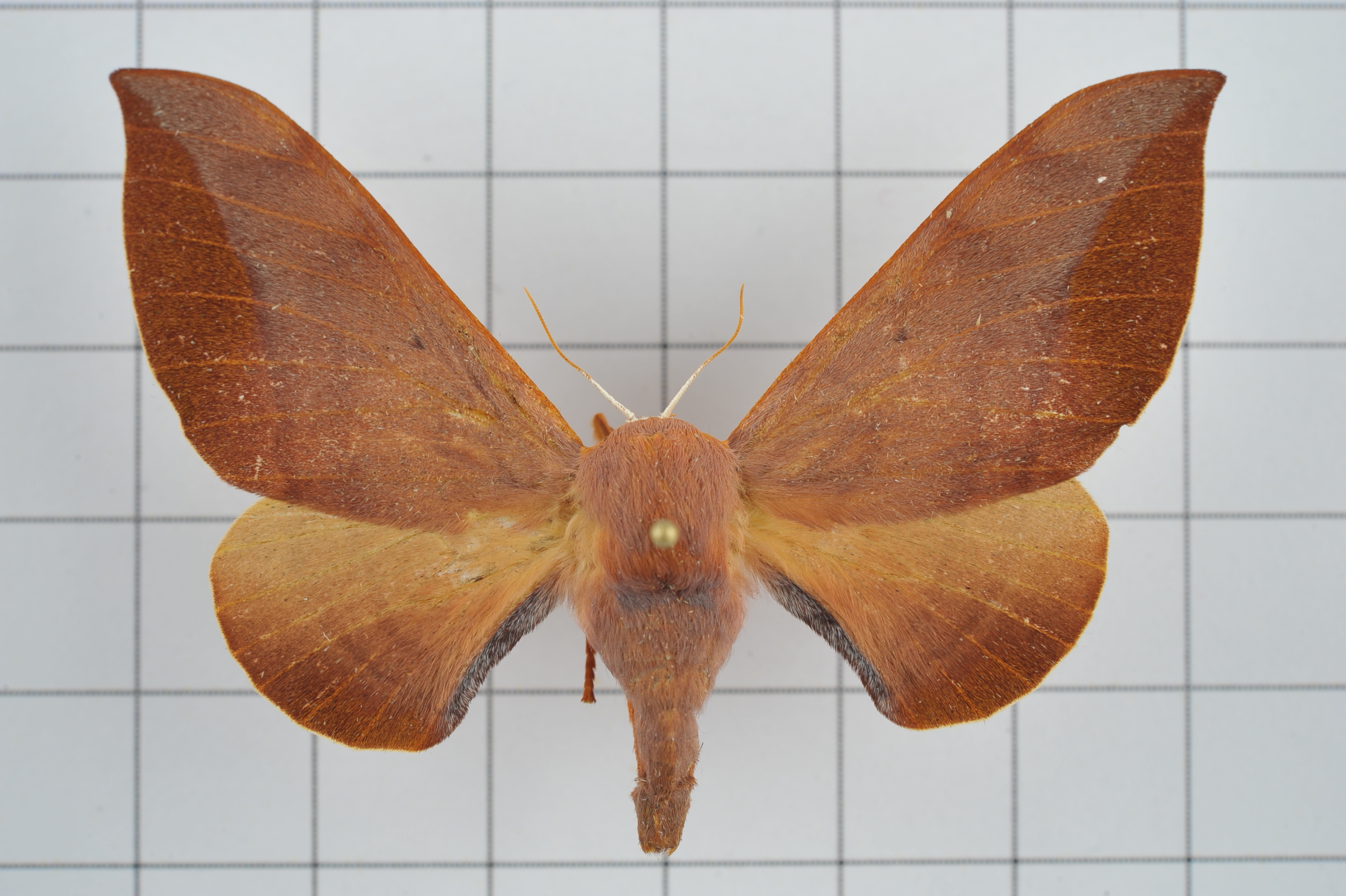

Scientific classification
- Kingdom: Animalia
- Phylum: Arthropoda
- Class: Insecta
- Order: Lepidoptera
- Family: Endromidae
- Genus: Mustilia
- Species: M. sphingiformis

Binomial name
- Mustilia sphingiformis Moore, 1879

= Mustilia sphingiformis =

Species of moth

Mustilia sphingiformis is a moth in the family Endromidae first described by Frederic Moore in 1879. It is found in south-east Asia, including Vietnam, Myanmar, India and Bhutan.

The wingspan is 58–82 mm. The head and thorax are purplish grey brown and the abdomen is dark brown. The forewings are pale red brown, with the markings slight and obsolescent. The whole outer area is suffused with chestnut from the apex to the outer angle as far as the postmedial line at the middle. The hindwings are mostly ochreous, but the inner area is brown.

The larvae have been recorded feeding on Ficus retusa and Fraxinus pennsylvanica.

== Subspecies ==
- Mustilia sphingiformis gerontica
- Mustilia sphingiformis gerontica West, 1932
