= Mustilia phaeopera =

Scientific classification
- Kingdom: Animalia
- Phylum: Arthropoda
- Class: Insecta
- Order: Lepidoptera
- Family: Endromidae
- Genus: Mustilia
- Species: M. phaeopera

Binomial name
- Mustilia phaeopera Hampson, 1910

Species of moth

Mustilia phaeopera is a moth in the family Endromidae first described by George Hampson in 1910. It is found in Nepal and India.

The larvae feed on the leaves of Camellia species.
