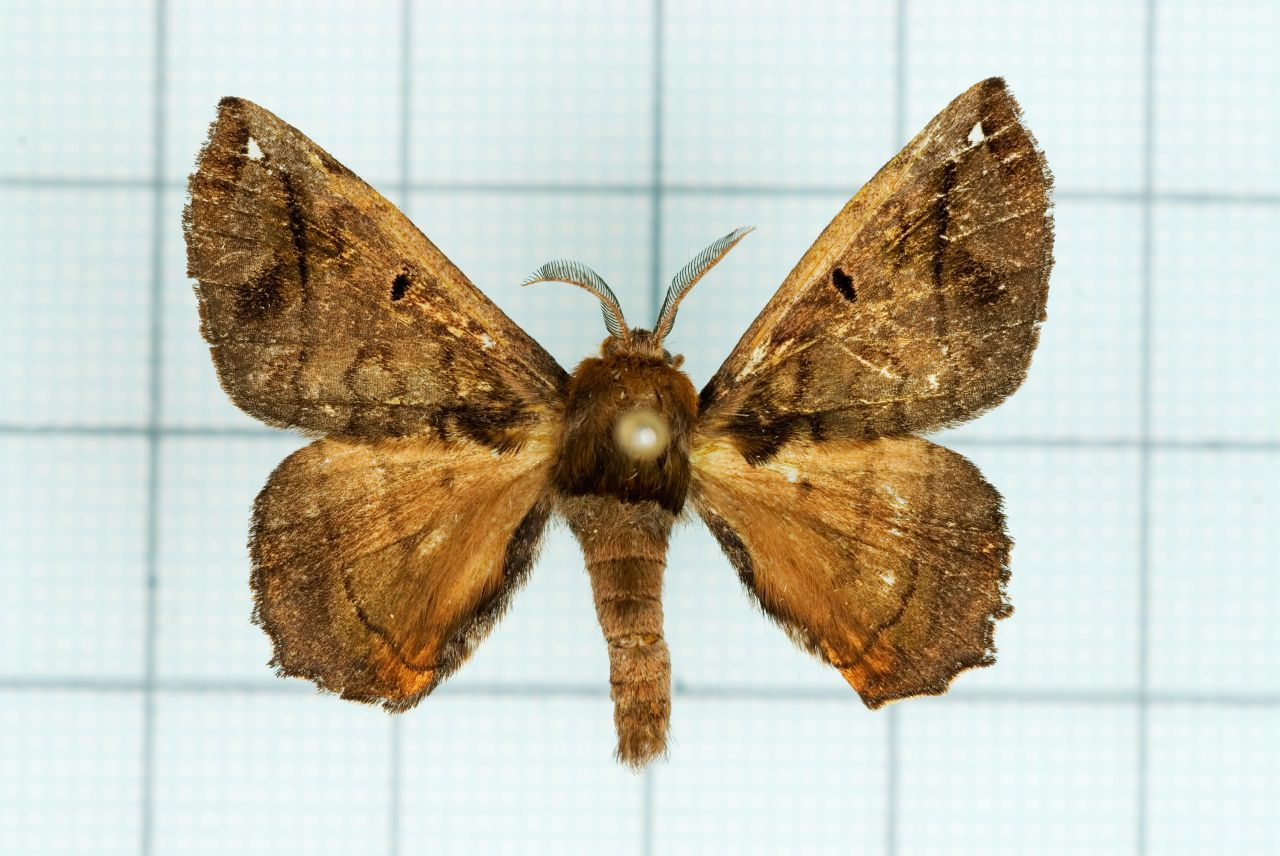
- Prismosticta fenestrata

Scientific classification
- Kingdom: Animalia
- Phylum: Arthropoda
- Class: Insecta
- Order: Lepidoptera
- Family: Endromidae
- Genus: Prismosticta; Butler, 1880

Type species
- Prismosticta fenestrata Butler, 1880

= Prismosticta =

Genus of moths

Prismosticta is a genus of moths of the family Endromidae first described by Arthur Gardiner Butler in 1880. The genus was previously placed in the subfamily Prismostictinae of the family Bombycidae.

== Species ==
- Prismosticta fenestrata Butler, 1880
- Prismosticta hyalinata Butler, 1885
- Prismosticta microprisma Zolotuhin & Witt, 2009
- Prismosticta regalis Zolotuhin & Witt, 2009
- Prismosticta tianpinga X. Wang, G.H. Huang & M. Wang, 2011
- Prismosticta tiretta Swinhoe, 1903
