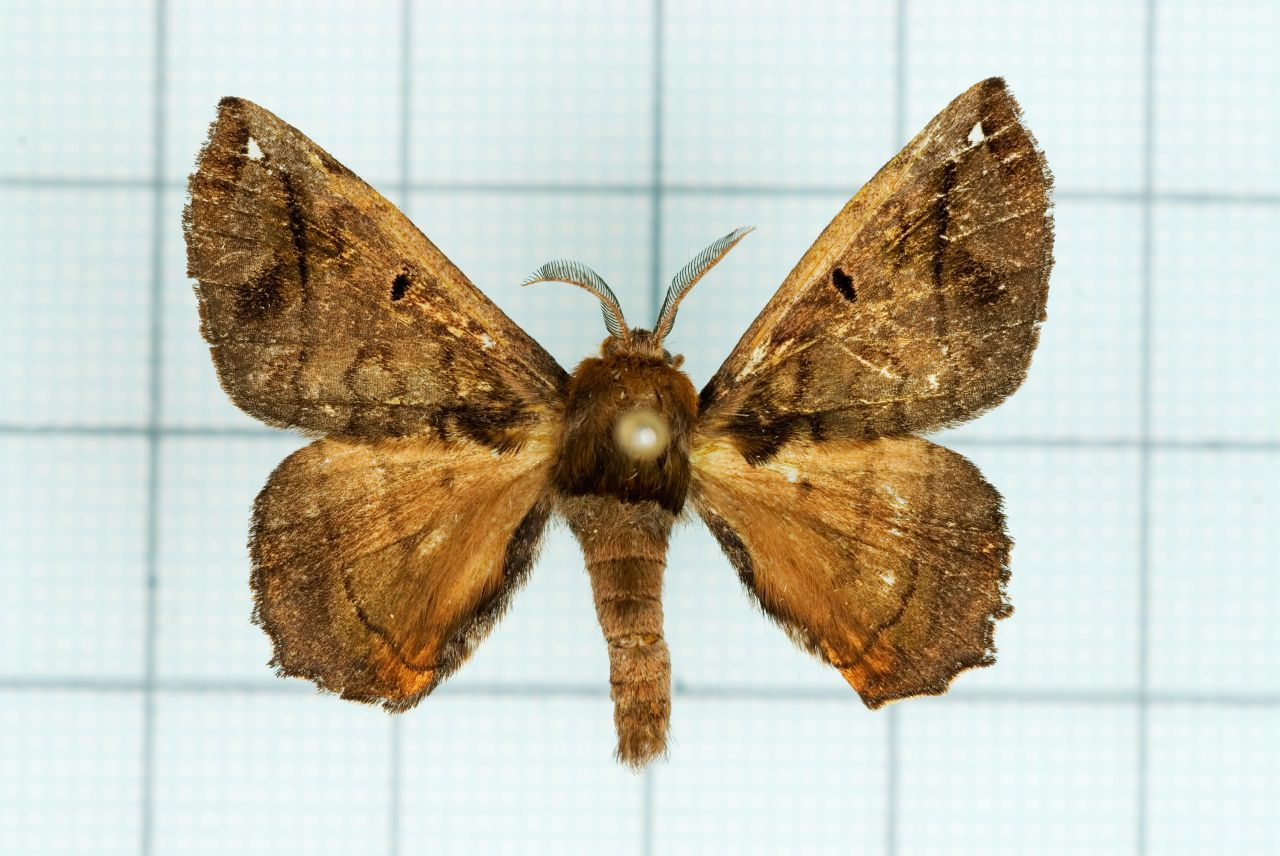

Scientific classification
- Kingdom: Animalia
- Phylum: Arthropoda
- Class: Insecta
- Order: Lepidoptera
- Family: Endromidae
- Genus: Prismosticta
- Species: P. fenestrata

Binomial name
- Prismosticta fenestrata Butler, 1880

Synonyms
- Prismosticta sinica Yang, 1995

= Prismosticta fenestrata =

Species of moth

Prismosticta fenestrata is a moth in the family Endromidae first described by Arthur Gardiner Butler in 1880. It is found in China (Zhejiang, Tibet), Taiwan, India and Nepal.
