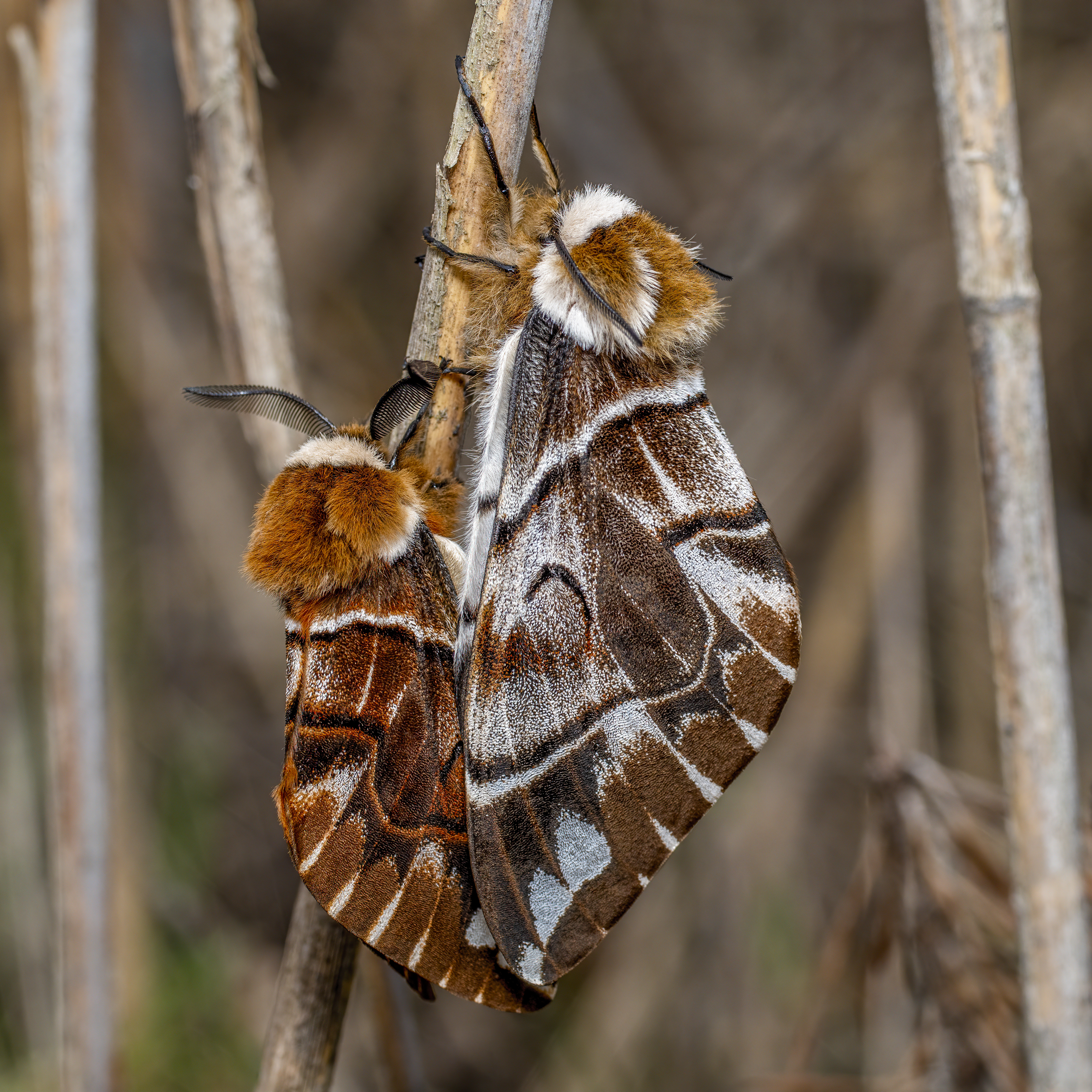

Scientific classification
- Kingdom: Animalia
- Phylum: Arthropoda
- Class: Insecta
- Order: Lepidoptera
- Family: Endromidae
- Genus: Endromis; Ochsenheimer, 1810
- Species: E. versicolora

Binomial name
- Endromis versicolora (Linnaeus, 1758)

Synonyms
- Phalaena versicolora Linnaeus, 1758

= Kentish glory =

Genus of moths

Endromis is a monotypic moth genus in the family Endromidae erected by Ferdinand Ochsenheimer in 1810. Its only species, Endromis versicolora, the Kentish glory, was described by Carl Linnaeus in his 1758 10th edition of Systema Naturae. It is found in the Palaearctic region.

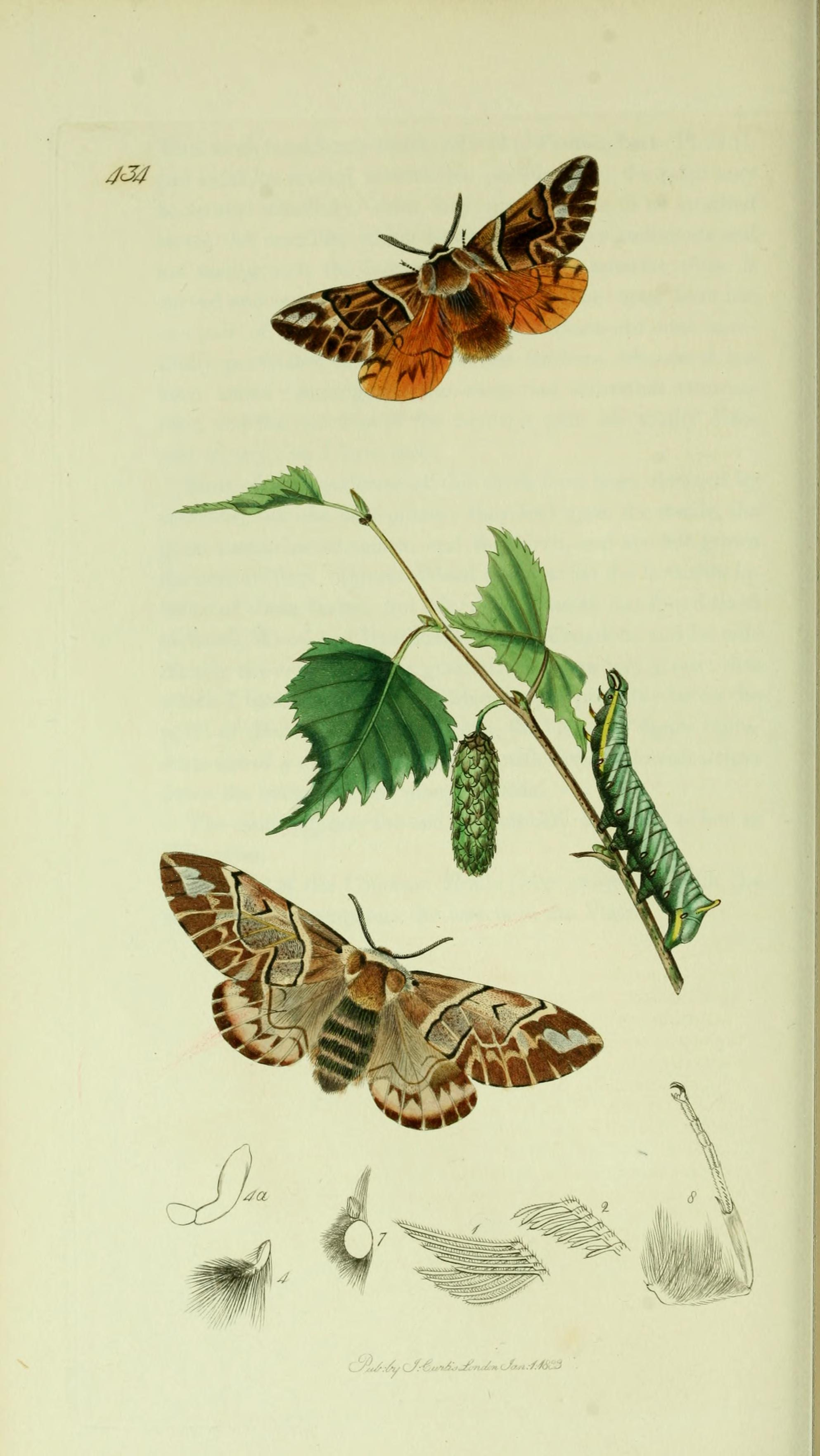
Illustration from John Curtis's British Entomology Volume 5

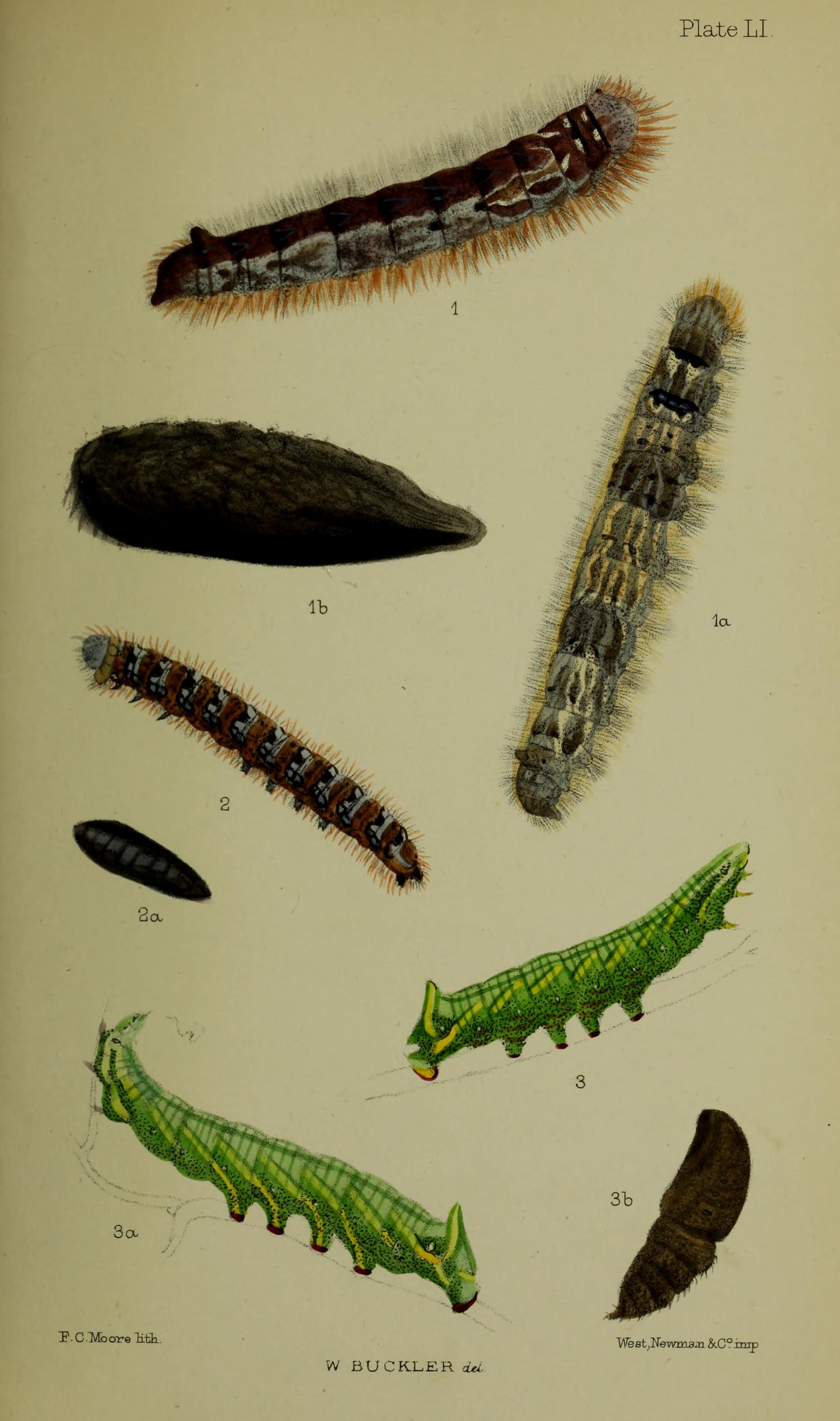
Fig3, 3a larvae after last moult 3b pupa

The wingspan is 50–70 mm. The adults fly from March to May. Females are much larger and paler than males and fly only at night in order to lay eggs. Males, which fly both by night and day, can detect female pheromones from a distance up to 2 km.

Yellow at first, then purplish-brown eggs are laid in two or three rows around a thin birch branch. After 10 to 14 days little black caterpillars hatch.

The caterpillars primarily feed on birch (Betula species), but accept other trees and shrubs: Alnus, Corylus, Tilia and Carpinus species. It is green with paler stripes. At first it feeds in small groups of 15 to 30 larvae, but mature caterpillars feed individually and only at night.

Endromis versicolora has a single generation per year; it overwinters as a pupa in a thin loose strong cocoon buried shallowly in the soil.

The Kentish Glory is primarily found in open birch woodlands, forest edges, and clear-fell areas. The species is confined to a few populations in Scotland and is listed on the Scottish Biodiversity List as being of principal conservation importance.

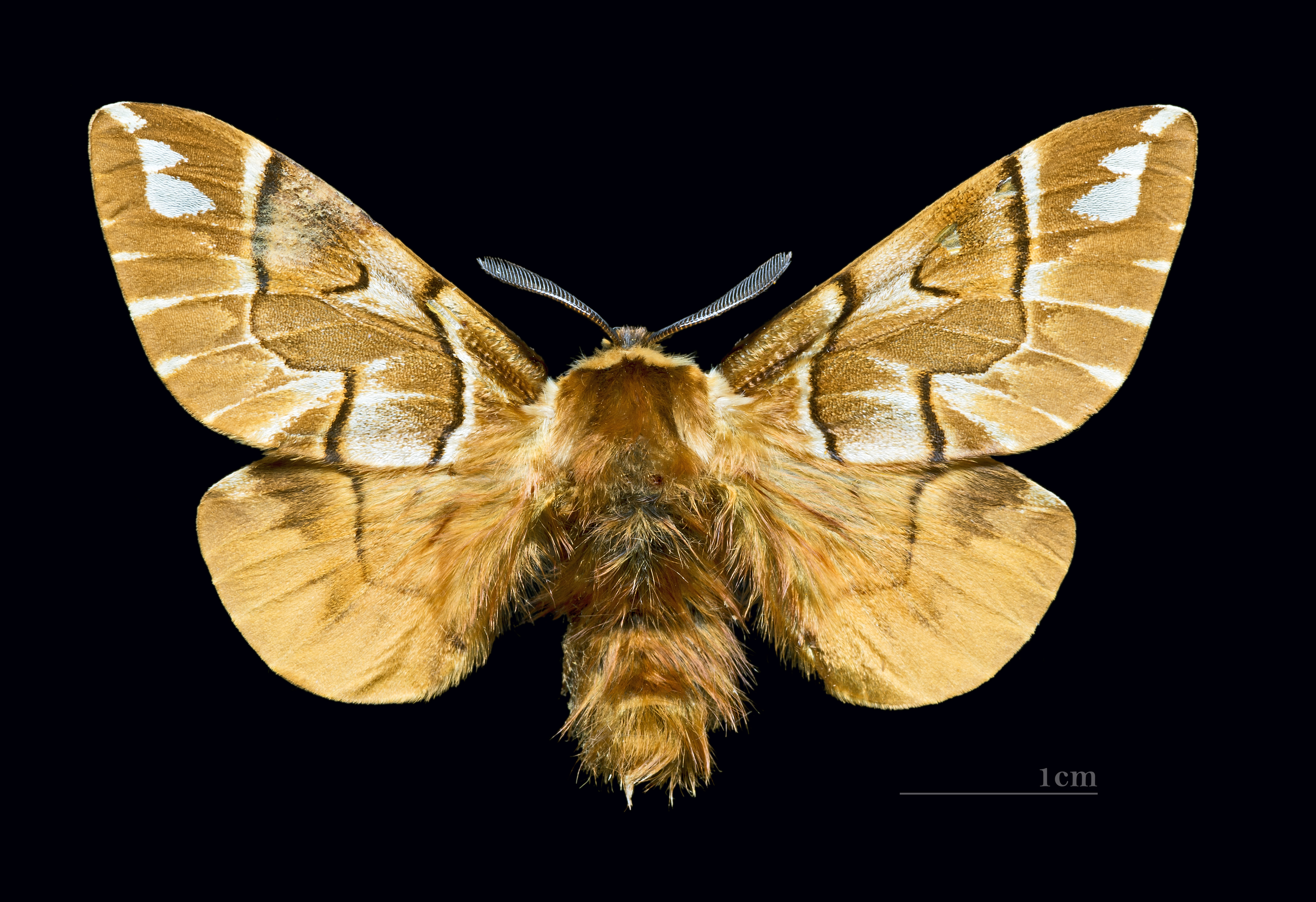
Male dorsal side, MHNT

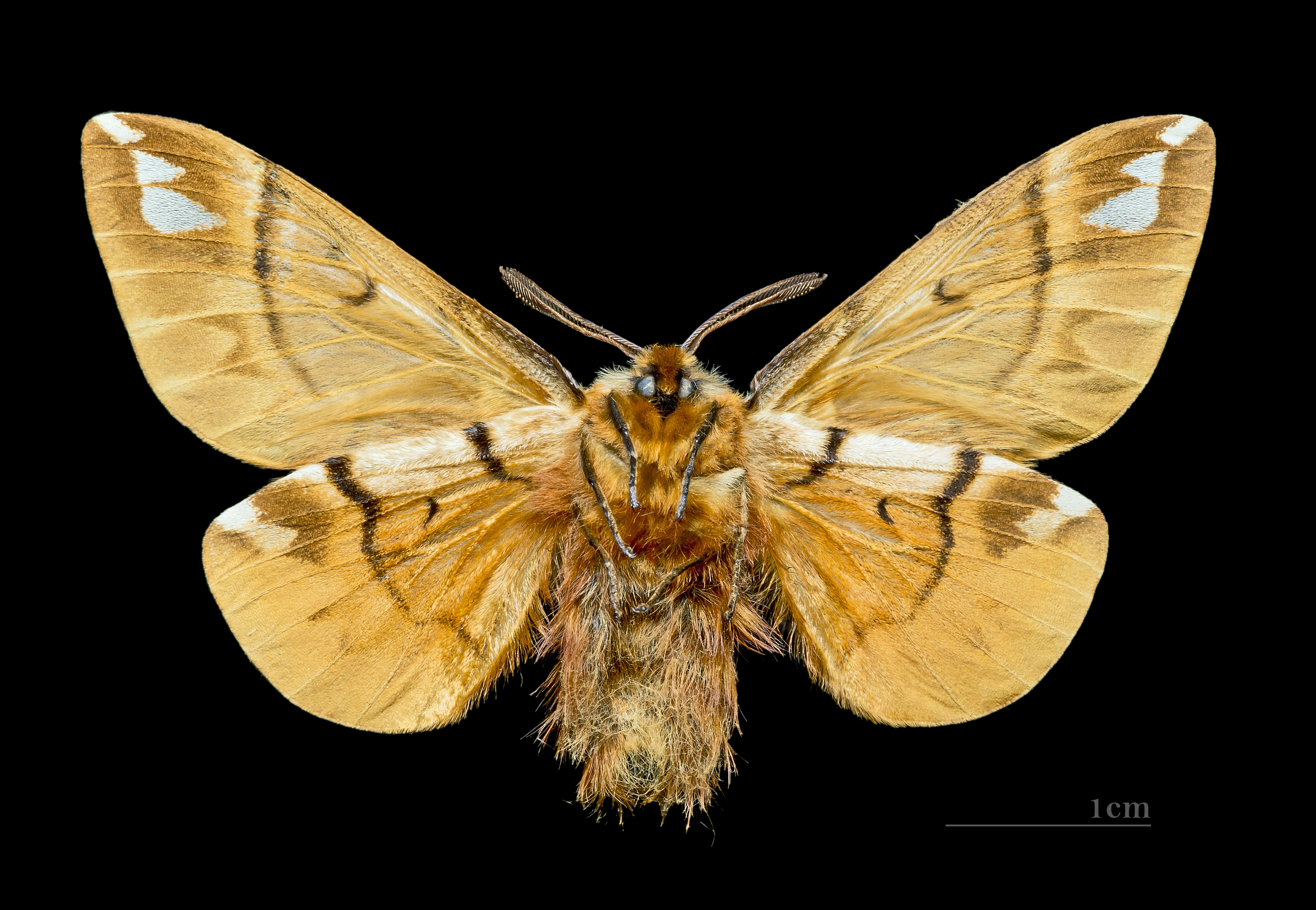
Male ventral side, MHNT

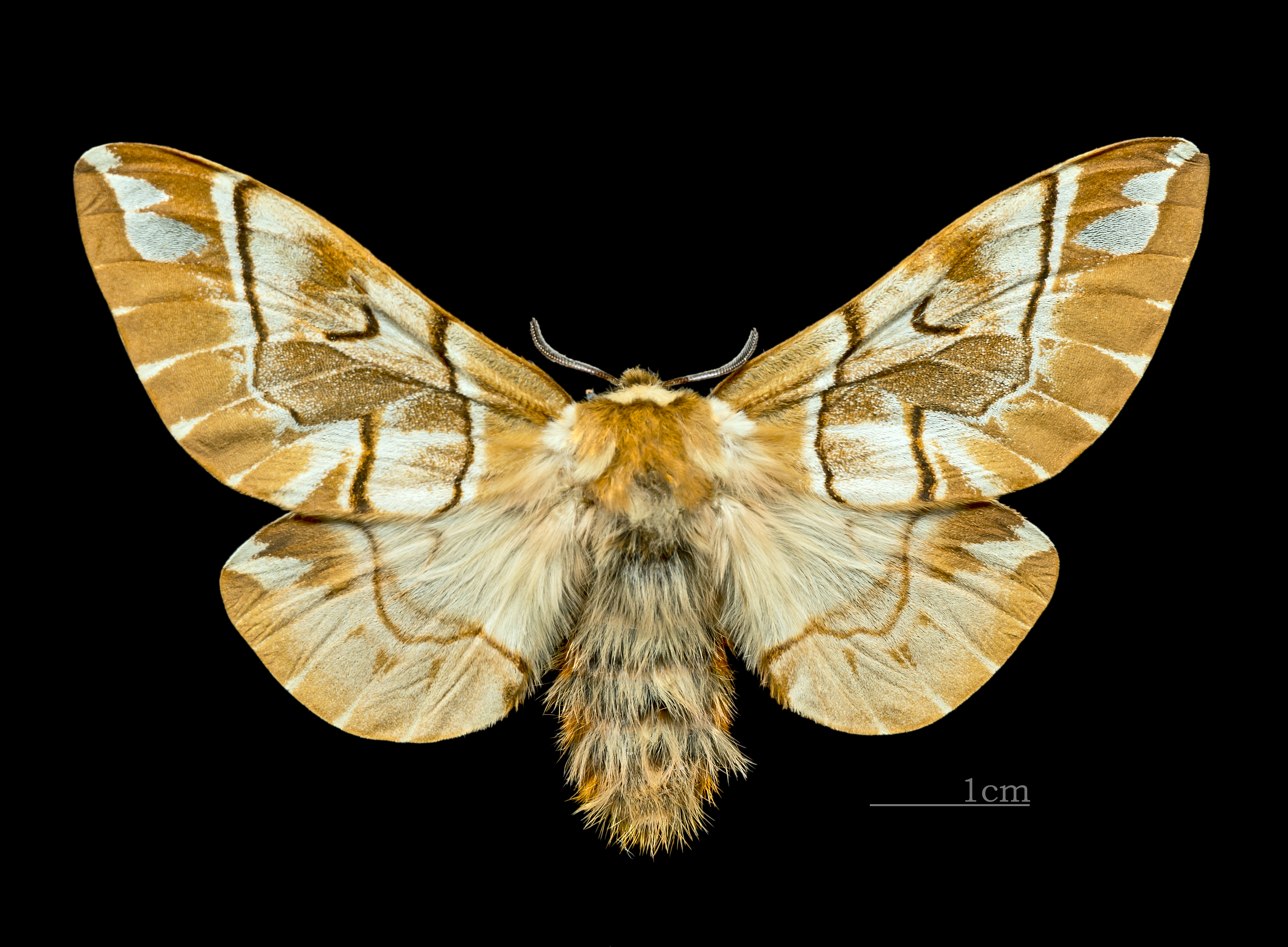
Female dorsal side, MHNT

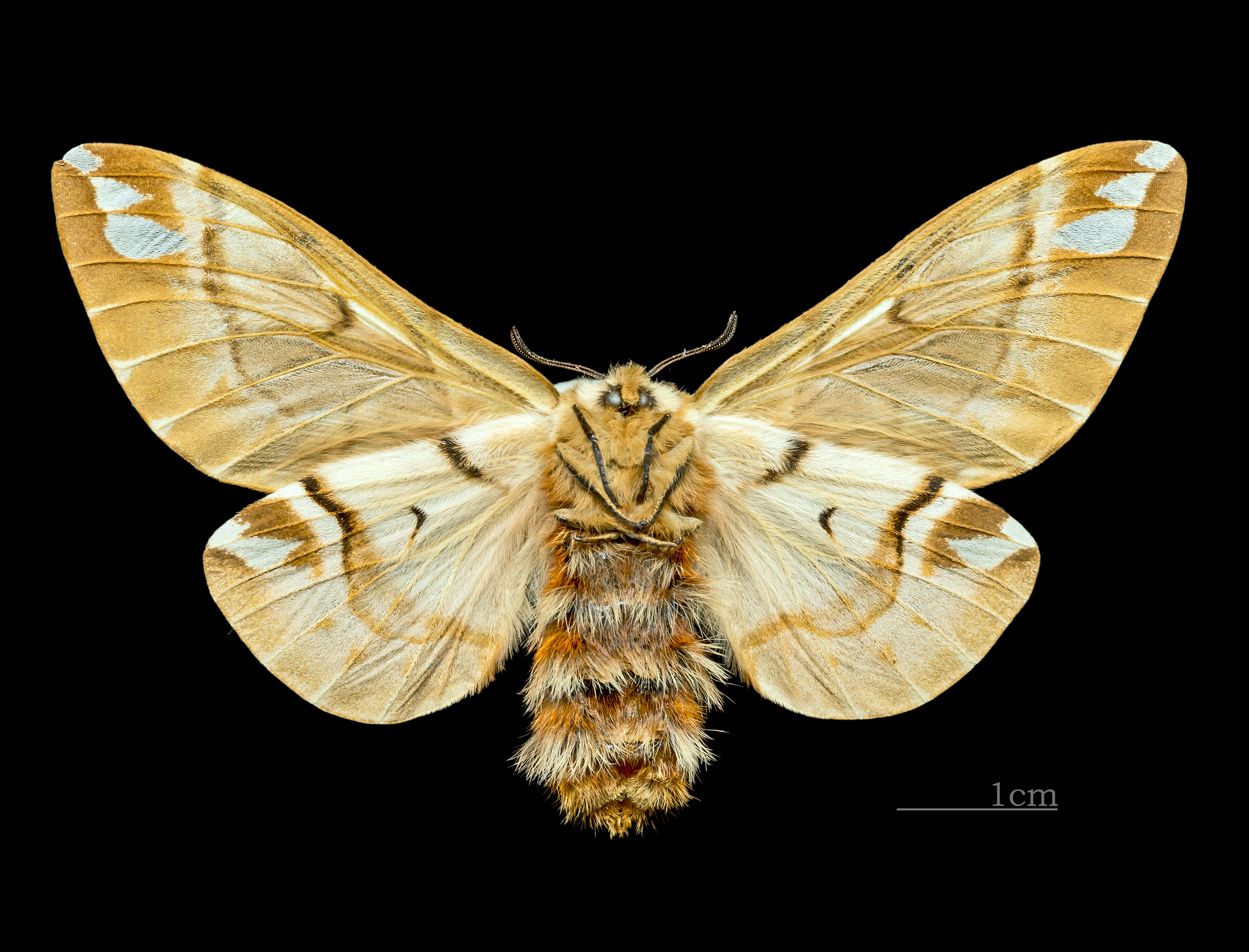
Female ventral side, MHNT
