= Dalailama (moth) =

Scientific classification
- Kingdom: Animalia
- Phylum: Arthropoda
- Class: Insecta
- Order: Lepidoptera
- Family: Endromidae
- Genus: Dalailama; Staudinger, 1896

Type species
- Dalailama bifurca Staudinger, 1896

Synonyms
- Dailalama Staudinger & Rebel, 1901; Deilelamia Pagenstecher, 1909

Genus of moths

Dalailama is a genus of moths of the family Endromidae, previously placed in the subfamily Oberthueriinae of the family Bombycidae.

== Species ==
- Dalailama bifurca Staudinger, 1896
- Dalailama vadim Witt, 2006
