= Mustilia falcipennis =

Scientific classification
- Kingdom: Animalia
- Phylum: Arthropoda
- Class: Insecta
- Order: Lepidoptera
- Family: Endromidae
- Genus: Mustilia
- Species: M. falcipennis

Binomial name
- Mustilia falcipennis Walker, 1865

Species of moth

Mustilia falcipennis is a moth in the family Endromidae first described by Francis Walker in 1865. It is found in India and Bhutan.

The wingspan is about 52 mm. The head and collar are chestnut, while the thorax and abdomen are purplish red brown, the latter yellowish towards the extremity. The forewings are red brown, suffused with grey. The hindwings have a yellow costal half, while the inner half is red brown.

The larvae feed on the leaves of Symplocos species.
