= Mustilizans =

Scientific classification
- Kingdom: Animalia
- Phylum: Arthropoda
- Class: Insecta
- Order: Lepidoptera
- Family: Endromidae
- Genus: Mustilizans; J. K. Yang, 1995

Genus of moths

Mustilizans is a genus of moths of the family Endromidae described by Ji-Kun Yang in 1995. The genus was previously placed in the subfamily Prismostictinae of the family Bombycidae.

== Species ==
- Subgenus Mustilizans
  - Mustilizans baishanzua Yang, 1995 (misspelled beishanzuna)
  - Mustilizans capella Zolotuhin, 2007
  - Mustilizans dierli (Holloway, 1987)
  - Mustilizans drepaniformis J. K. Yang, 1995
  - Mustilizans eitschbergeri Zolotuhin, 2007
  - Mustilizans hepatica (Moore, 1879)
  - Mustilizans lepusa Zolotuhin, 2007
  - Mustilizans predicta Zolotuhin, 2007
  - Mustilizans shennongi Yang & Mao, 1995
  - Mustilizans sinjaevi Zolotuhin, 2007
- Subgenus Promustilia Zolotuhin, 2007
  - Mustilizans andracoides Zolotuhin, 2007
