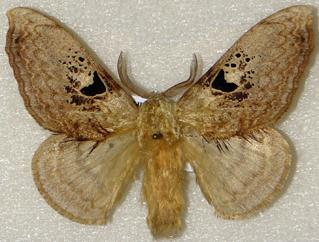
- Mirina christophi

Scientific classification
- Kingdom: Animalia
- Phylum: Arthropoda
- Class: Insecta
- Order: Lepidoptera
- Family: Endromidae
- Genus: Mirina; Staudinger, 1892

Synonyms
- Mirinidae Kozlov, 1985

= Mirina =

Genus of moths

Mirina is genus of moths in the Endromidae family. It was previously assigned to the family Bombycidae or as its own family, the Mirinidae. The genus contains three described species.

== Species ==
- Mirina christophi (Staudinger, 1887)
- Mirina confucius Zolotuhin & Witt, 2000
- Mirina fenzeli Mell, 1938
