= Dalailama vadim =

Scientific classification
- Kingdom: Animalia
- Phylum: Arthropoda
- Clade: Pancrustacea
- Class: Insecta
- Order: Lepidoptera
- Family: Endromidae
- Genus: Dalailama
- Species: D. vadim

Binomial name
- Dalailama vadim Witt, 2006

Species of moth

Dalailama vadim is a species of moth in the family Endromidae. It was described by in 2006. It is found in China (Sichuan).
