= Sesquiluna =

Scientific classification
- Kingdom: Animalia
- Phylum: Arthropoda
- Clade: Pancrustacea
- Class: Insecta
- Order: Lepidoptera
- Family: Endromidae
- Genus: Sesquiluna; Forbes, 1955

Type species
- Andraca albilunata Hampson, 1910

Genus of moths

Sesquiluna is a genus of moths of the Endromidae family.

== Species ==
- Sesquiluna albilunata (Hampson, 1910)
- Sesquiluna forbesi Zolotuhin & Witt, 2009
- Sesquiluna theophoboides Zolotuhin & Witt, 2009
