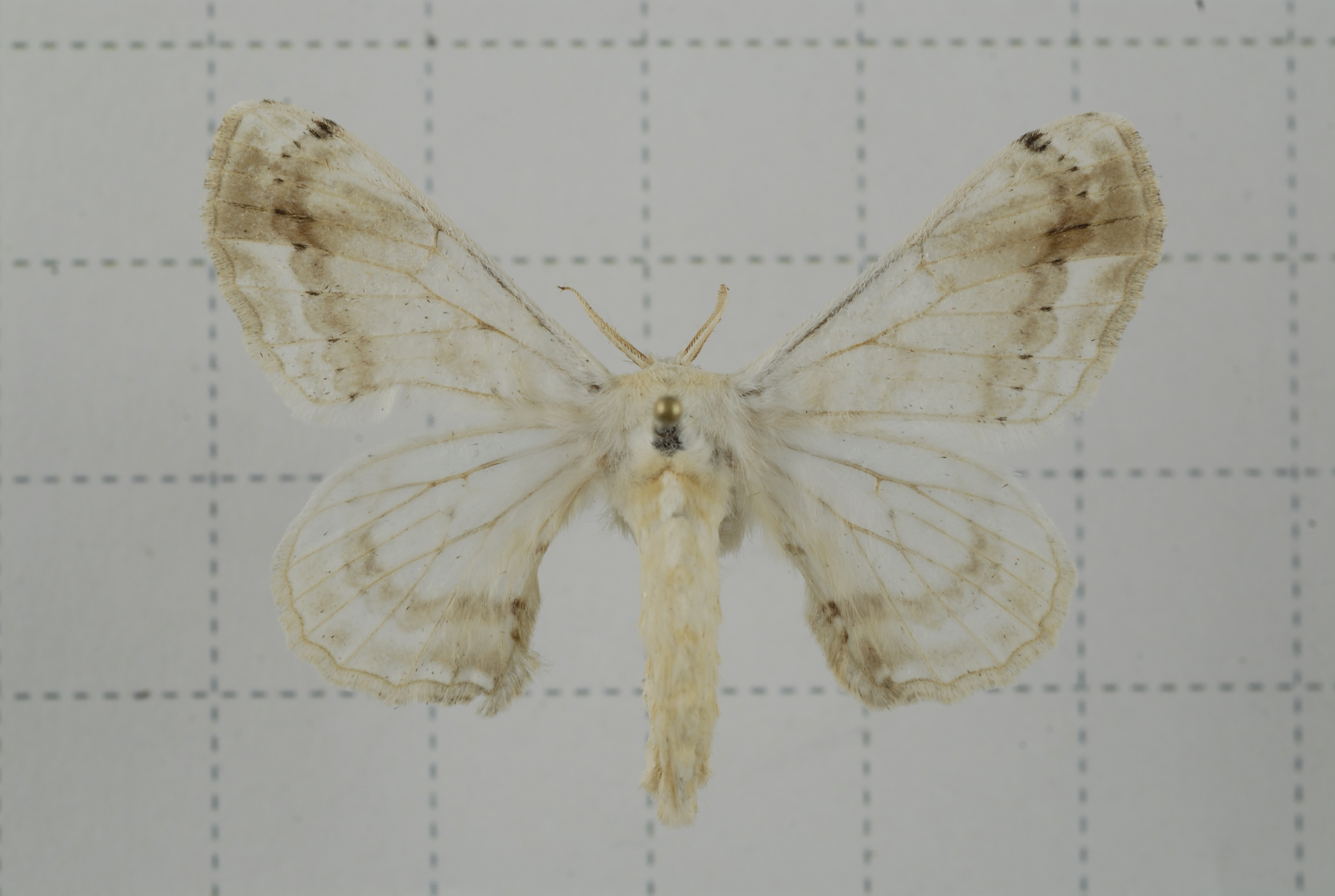

Scientific classification
- Domain: Eukaryota
- Kingdom: Animalia
- Phylum: Arthropoda
- Class: Insecta
- Order: Lepidoptera
- Family: Bombycidae
- Genus: Ernolatia
- Species: E. moorei

Binomial name
- Ernolatia moorei (Hutton, 1865)

Synonyms
- Ocinara moorei Hutton, 1865; Bombyx plana Walker, 1865

= Ernolatia moorei =

Species of moth

Ernolatia moorei is a moth in the family Bombycidae first described by Thomas Hutton in 1865. It is found in Sri Lanka, India, southern China, Borneo and Taiwan.

The wingspan is 30–35 mm.

The larvae feed on the leaves of Ficus superba. They reach a length of 4.4 mm when full grown.
