= Oberthueria (beetle) =

Scientific classification
- Domain: Eukaryota
- Kingdom: Animalia
- Phylum: Arthropoda
- Class: Insecta
- Order: Coleoptera
- Suborder: Adephaga
- Family: Carabidae
- Subfamily: Pterostichinae
- Tribe: Pterostichini
- Subtribe: Pterostichina
- Genus: Oberthueria; Vuillet, 1911
- Species: O. guiteli

Binomial name
- Oberthueria guiteli Vuillet, 1911

Genus of beetles

Oberthueria is a genus of in the beetle family Carabidae. This genus has a single species, Oberthueria guiteli.
