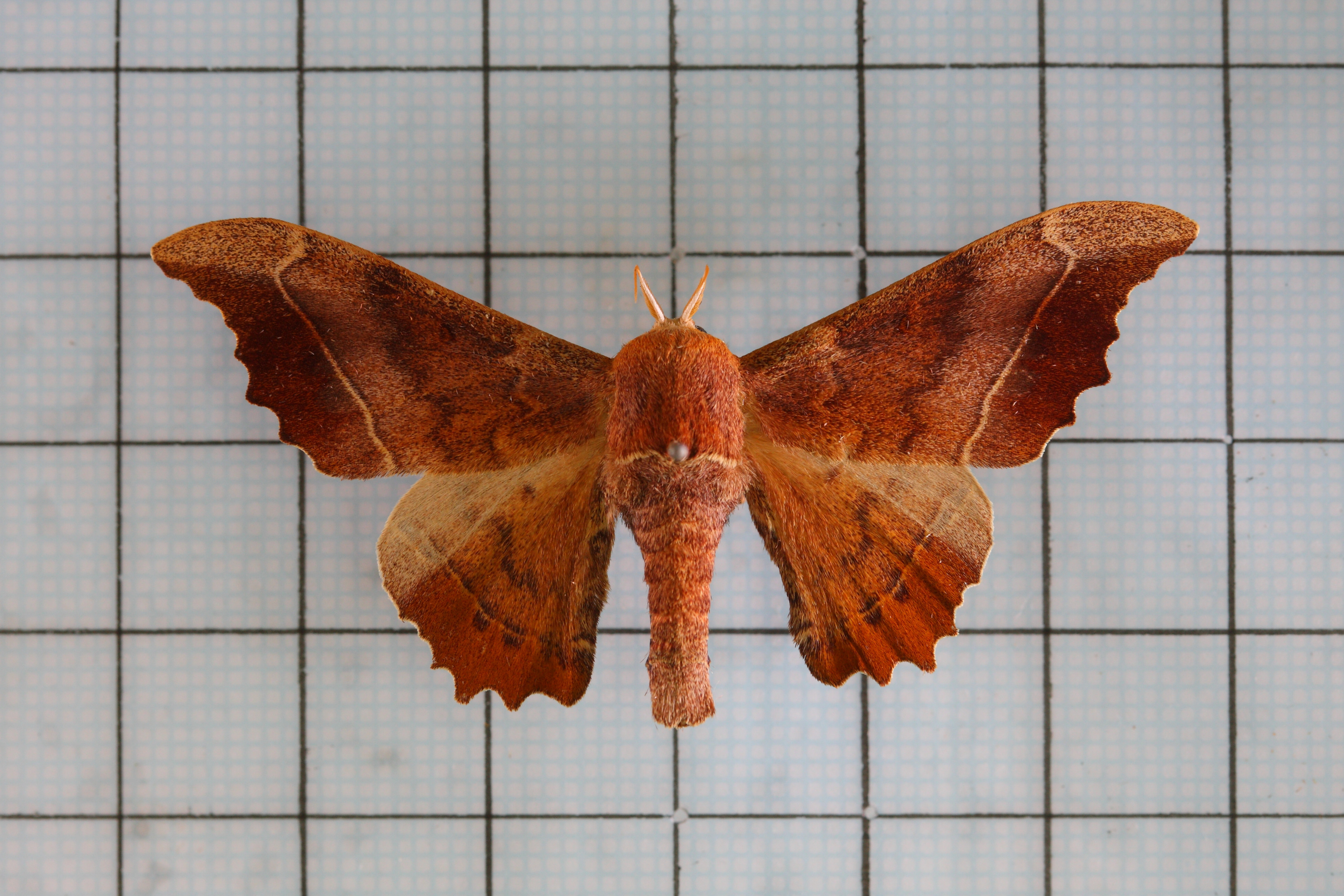
- Oberthueria formosibia

Scientific classification
- Kingdom: Animalia
- Phylum: Arthropoda
- Class: Insecta
- Order: Lepidoptera
- Family: Endromidae
- Genus: Oberthueria; Kirby, 1892

Type species
- Euphranor caeca Oberthür, 1880

Synonyms
- Euphranor Oberthür, 1880; Euphraor Kirby, 1892; Oberthueria Staudinger, 1892; Oberthüria Staudinger, 1892

= Oberthueria (moth) =

Genus of moths

Oberthueria is a genus of moths of the Endromidae family. The genus was previously placed in the subfamily Oberthueriinae of the Bombycidae family.

== Species ==
- Oberthueria caeca (Oberthür, 1880)
- Oberthueria falcigera (Butler, 1878)
- Oberthueria formosibia Matsumura, 1927
- Oberthueria jiatongae Zolotuhin & Xing Wang, 2013
- Oberthueria lunwan Zolotuhin & Xing Wang, 2013
- Oberthueria yandu Zolotuhin & Xing Wang, 2013
