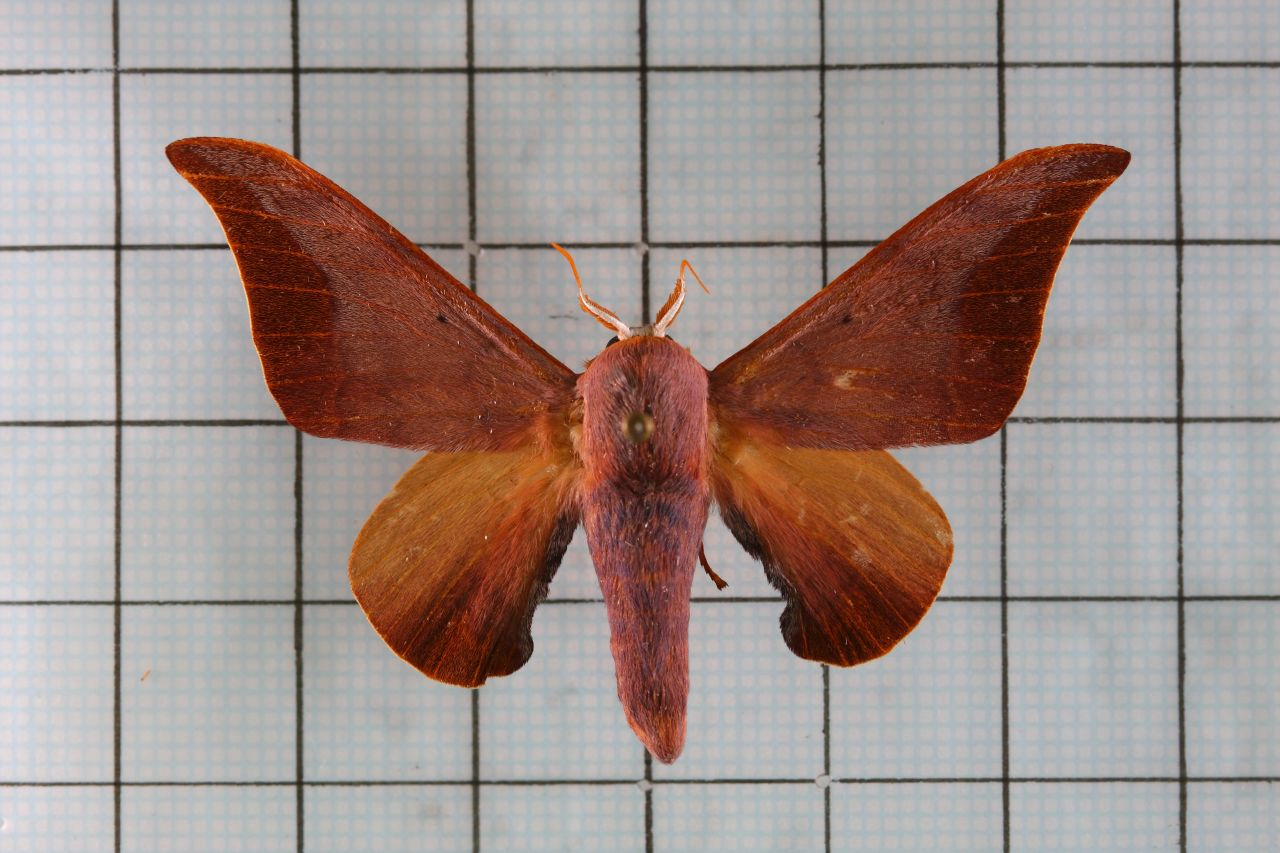
- Mustilia sphingiformis gerontica

Scientific classification
- Kingdom: Animalia
- Phylum: Arthropoda
- Class: Insecta
- Order: Lepidoptera
- Family: Endromidae
- Genus: Mustilia; Walker, 1865

= Mustilia =

Genus of moths

Mustilia is a genus of moths of the family Endromidae. The genus was previously placed in the subfamily Prismostictinae of the family Bombycidae.

== Selected species ==
- Subgenus Mustilia
  - Mustilia attacina Zolotuhin, 2007
  - Mustilia castanea Moore, 1879
  - Mustilia falcipennis Walker 1865
  - Mustilia lieftincki Roepke, 1948
  - Mustilia lobata Zolotuhin, 2007
  - Mustilia orthocosta Yang, 1995
  - Mustilia pai Zolotuhin, 2007
  - Mustilia sabriformis Zolotuhin, 2007
  - Mustilia sphingiformis Moore, 1879
    - Mustilia sphingiformis gerontica West, 1932
- Subgenus Smerkata Zolotuhin, 2007
  - Mustilia brechlini Zolotuhin, 2007
  - Mustilia craptalis Zolotuhin, 2007
  - Mustilia fusca Kishida, 1993
  - Mustilia phaeopera Hampson, 1910
  - Mustilia soosi Zolotuhin, 2007
  - Mustilia tzarica Zolotuhin, 2007
  - Mustilia ulliae Zolotuhin, 2007
  - Mustilia zolotuhini Saldaitis & Ivinskis, 2015
- Subgenus unknown
  - Mustilia columbaris Butler, 1886
  - Mustilia glabrata Yang, 1995
  - Mustilia semiravida Yang, 1995
  - Mustilia terminata Yang, 1995
