= Tianping Mountain =

Mountain in Jiangsu, China

Tianping Mountain 天平山
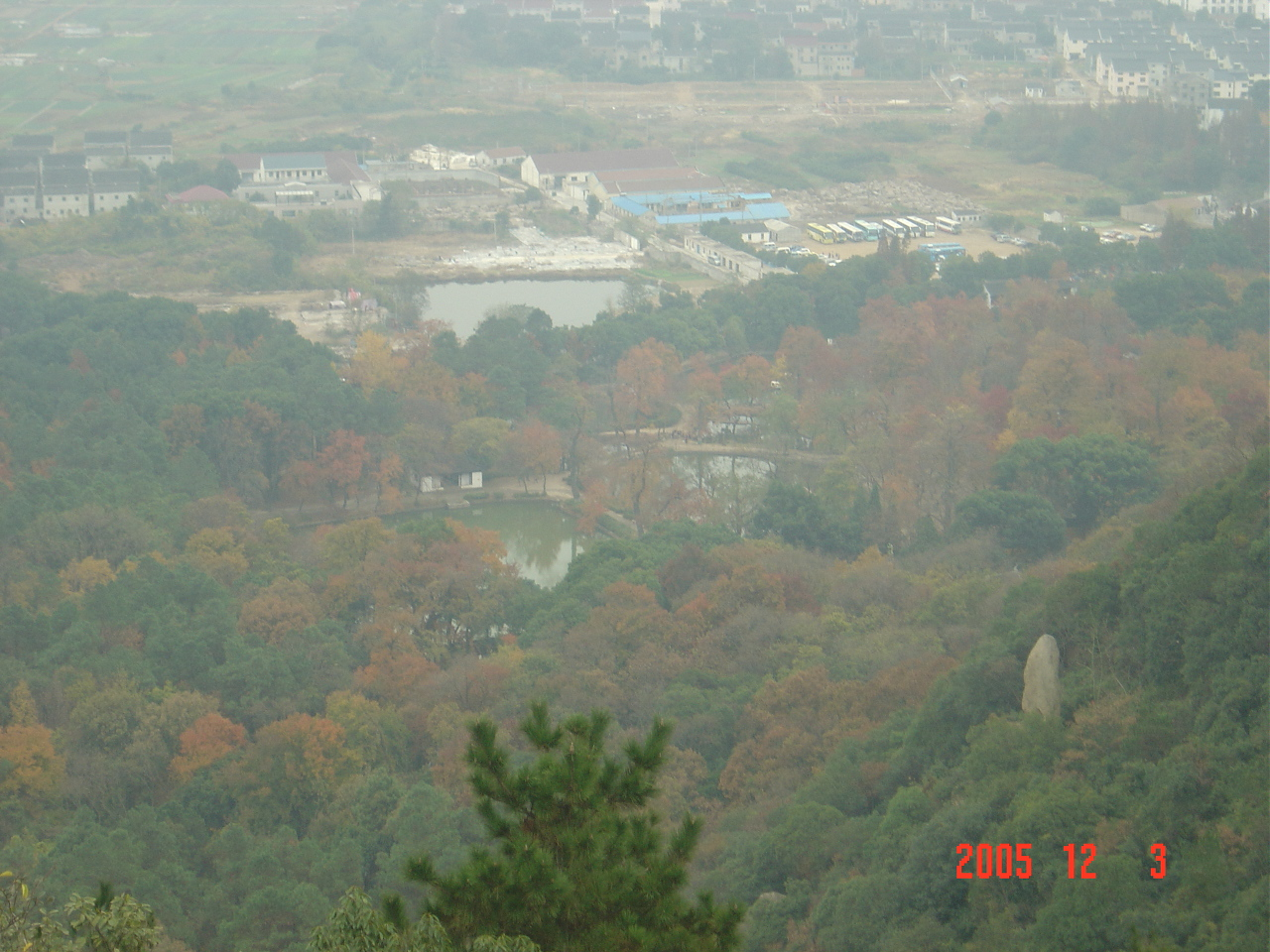

Highest point
- Elevation: 201 m (659 ft)

Geography
- Location: Suzhou, Jiangsu Province, China

Tianping Mountain (Chinese: 天平山, literally Flat Heaven Mountain), also called Baiyun Mountain (Chinese: 白云山) or Ci Mountain (Chinese: 赐山), is a mountain located in southwestern Suzhou, Jiangsu, China. Its elevation is about 201 meters. The mountain gained fame due to Fan Zhongyan, whose ancestors were buried there. And now, Fan Zhongyan Memorial has been established near the mountain. Tianping Mountain is also famous for its stone, spring and maple.
