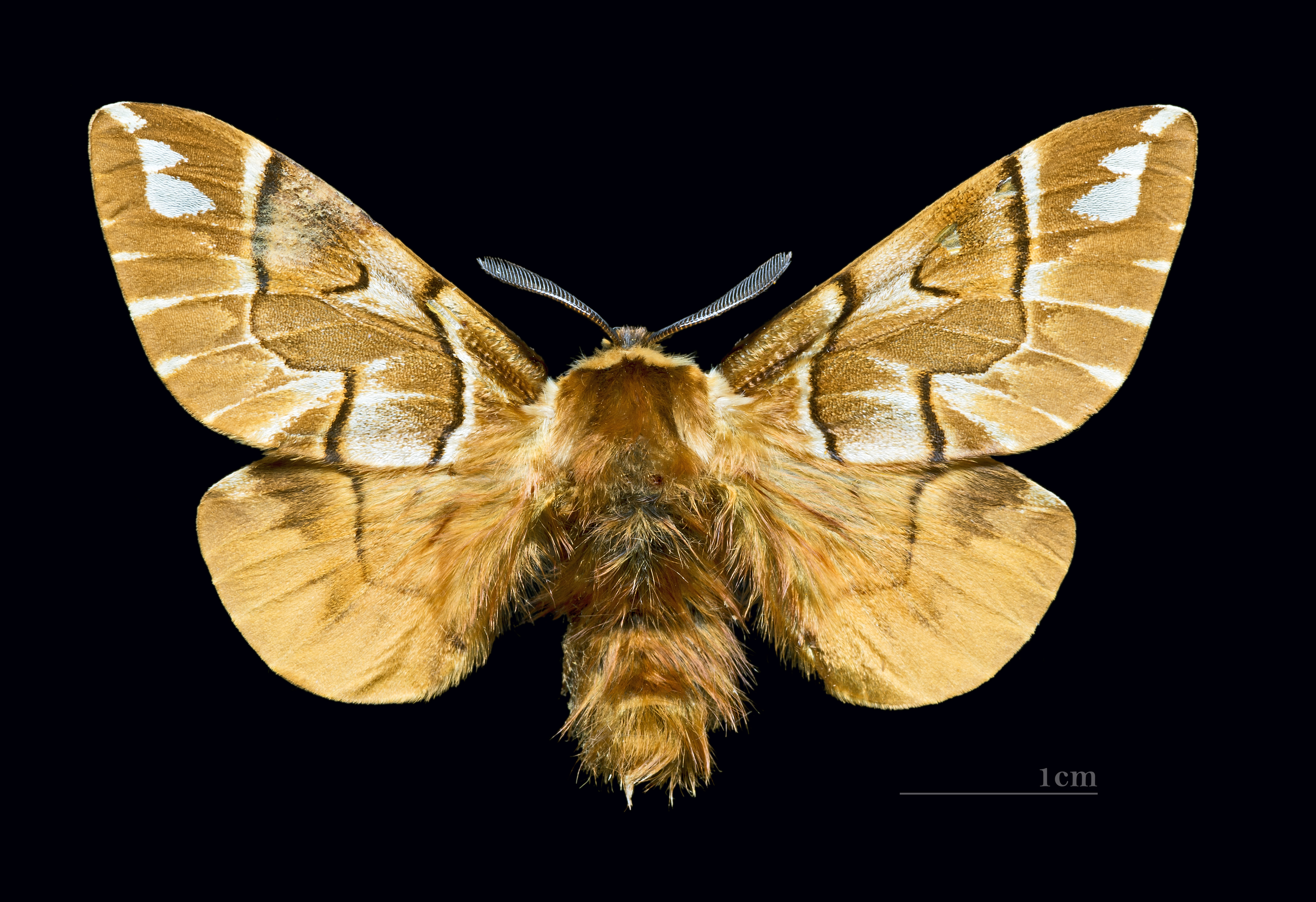
- Endromis versicolora

Scientific classification
- Kingdom: Animalia
- Phylum: Arthropoda
- Clade: Pancrustacea
- Class: Insecta
- Order: Lepidoptera
- Superfamily: Bombycoidea
- Family: Endromidae; Boisduval, 1828

= Endromidae =

Family of moths

Endromidae is a family of moths consisting of 16 genera with 72 species. This relictual family is related to the families Carthaeidae, Anthelidae, and Phiditiidae as part of the bombycine group "CAPOPEM".

== Genera ==
The following genera are recognised in the family Endromidae:

- Subfamily Endrominae
  - Endromis Ochsenheimer, 1810
- Subfamily Mirininae
  - Mirina Staudinger, 1892
- Subfamily Oberthueriinae
  - Andraca Walker, 1865
  - Comparmustilia Wang, X. & Zolotuhin, 2015
  - Dalailama Staudinger, 1896
  - Falcogona Zolotuhin, 2007
  - Mustilia Walker, 1865
  - Mustilizans J.K. Yang, 1995
  - Oberthueria Kirby, 1892
  - Promustilia Zolotuhin, 2007
  - Pseudandraca Miyata, 1970
  - Smerkata Zolotuhin, 2007
- Subfamily Prismostictinae
  - Prismosticta Butler, 1880
  - Prismostictoides Zolotuhin & T.T. Du, 2011
  - Sesquiluna Forbes, 1955
  - Theophoba Fletcher & Nye, 1982
