= List of moths of Australia (Herminiidae) =

Partial list of Australian moths

This is a list of the Australian moth species of the family Herminiidae. It also acts as an index to the species articles and forms part of the full list of moths of Australia.

- Adrapsa ablualis Walker, 1859
- Auchmophanes megalosara (Turner, 1909)
- Auchmophanes ochrospila Turner, 1908
- Auchmophanes platysara (Turner, 1929)
- Bocana manifestalis Walker, 1859
- Corethrobela melanophaes Turner, 1908
- Hydrillodes dimissalis (Walker, 1866)
- Hydrillodes funestalis (Walker, 1866)
- Hydrillodes metisalis (Walker, 1859)
- Lithilaria anomozancla (Turner, 1944)
- Lithilaria melanostrotum (Turner, 1906)
- Lithilaria ossicolor Rosenstock, 1885
- Lithilaria proestans (T.P. Lucas, 1895)
- Mormoscopa phricozona (Turner, 1902)
- Mormoscopa sordescens (Rosenstock, 1885)
- Nodaria aneliopis Turner, 1904
- Nodaria cornicalis (Fabricius, 1794)
- Pogonia umbrifera (T.P. Lucas, 1895)
- Polypogon fractalis (Guenée, 1854)
- Simplicia armatalis (Walker, 1866)
- Simplicia caeneusalis (Walker, 1859)
- Simplicia erebina (Butler, 1887)
- Simplicia rufa A.E. Prout, 1929
- Squamipalpis pantoea (Turner, 1908)
- Stenhypena albopunctata (Bethune-Baker, 1908)
