= Simplicia inareolalis =

Scientific classification
- Domain: Eukaryota
- Kingdom: Animalia
- Phylum: Arthropoda
- Class: Insecta
- Order: Lepidoptera
- Superfamily: Noctuoidea
- Family: Erebidae
- Genus: Simplicia
- Species: S. inareolalis

Binomial name
- Simplicia inareolalis Fryer, 1912

Species of moth

Simplicia inareolalis is a litter moth of the family Erebidae. It is found in the Seychelles on Mahé and Silhouette islands.

In markings and general appearance this species resembles to Simplicia inflexalis but with the notable difference that it does not bear a trace of an areole.
