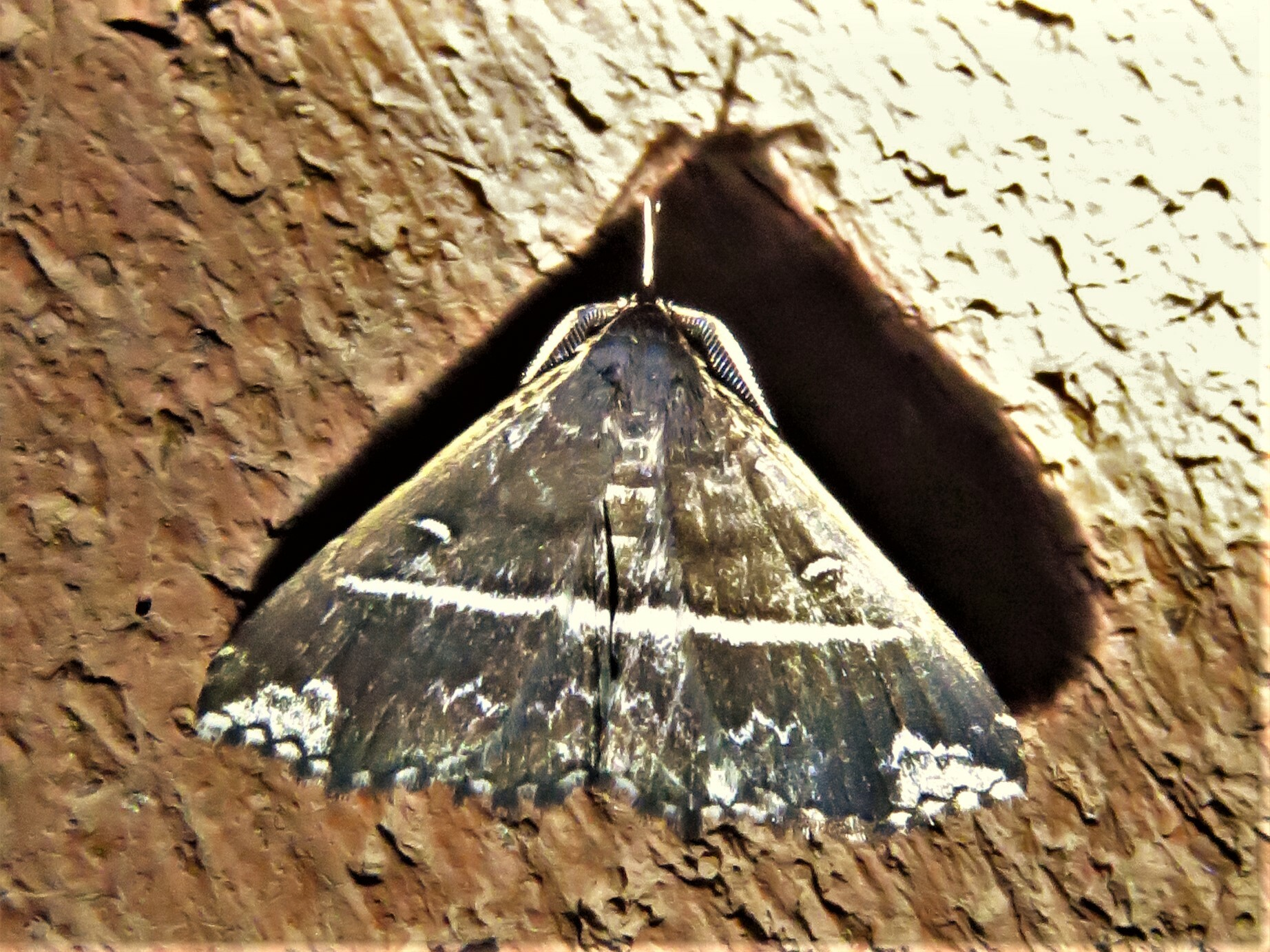
- Adrapsa occidens

Scientific classification
- Kingdom: Animalia
- Phylum: Arthropoda
- Clade: Pancrustacea
- Class: Insecta
- Order: Lepidoptera
- Superfamily: Noctuoidea
- Family: Erebidae
- Subfamily: Herminiinae
- Genus: Adrapsa; Walker, [1859]

Synonyms
- Lusia Walker, [1858]; Onevatha Walker, [1859]; Badiza Walker, 1864; Murgisa Walker, 1864; Amilaga Swinhoe, 1901; Apladrapsa Warren, 1913

= Adrapsa =

Genus of moths

Adrapsa is a genus of moths of the family Erebidae. It was erected by Francis Walker in 1859.

== Description ==
Palpi with second joint reaching above vertex of head. Thorax and abdomen smoothly scaled. Tibia slightly hairy. Forewings with somewhat acute apex. Hindwings with short cell. Veins 3 and 4 usually stalked with stalked vein 6 and 7. Vein 5 from near lower angle of cell.

== Species ==
In alphabetical order:

- Adrapsa ablualis Walker, [1859]
- Adrapsa abnormalis Swinhoe, 1895
- Adrapsa albapicata Holland, 1900
- Adrapsa albirenalis (Moore, 1867)
- Adrapsa albofasciatus Rothschild, 1920
- Adrapsa alsusalis (Walker, [1859])
- Adrapsa ambrensis Viette, 1965
- Adrapsa angulifascia Rothschild, 1920
- Adrapsa angulilinea Prout, 1928
- Adrapsa atratalis Swinhoe, 1905
- Adrapsa basiferruginea Rothschild, 1920
- Adrapsa bupalistis Strand, 1920
- Adrapsa chartalis Swinhoe, 1906
- Adrapsa cyanographa (Snellen, [1886])
- Adrapsa despecta (Walker, 1865)
- Adrapsa distorta (Swinhoe, 1895)
- Adrapsa editha Swinhoe, 1902
- Adrapsa ereboides (Walker, [1863])
- Adrapsa fenisecalis (Snellen, 1880)
- Adrapsa geometroides (Walker, [1858])
- Adrapsa incertalis Leech, 1900
- Adrapsa insolida (Prout, 1928)
- Adrapsa luma Viette, 1961
- Adrapsa lunuleditha Holloway, 2008
- Adrapsa maerens Holloway, 2008
- Adrapsa marmorea (Swinhoe, 1902)
- Adrapsa nigella (Swinhoe, 1890)
- Adrapsa notigera (Butler, 1879)
- Adrapsa occidens Prout, 1927
- Adrapsa ochracea Leech, 1900
- Adrapsa orgyoides (Walker, 1864)
- Adrapsa pallidisigna (Prout, 1922)
- Adrapsa peregrina (Schultze, 1907)
- Adrapsa pseudoscopigera Holloway, 2008
- Adrapsa quadrilinealis Wileman, 1914
- Adrapsa radiata Viette, 1965
- Adrapsa retiata Joannis, 1930
- Adrapsa rivulata Leech, 1900
- Adrapsa scopigera (Moore, [1885])
- Adrapsa simplex (Butler, 1879)
- Adrapsa subnotigera Owada, 1982
- Adrapsa tenomigera Holloway, 2008
- Adrapsa terroides Holloway, 2008
- Adrapsa thermesia Swinhoe, 1902
- Adrapsa unilinealis Roepke, 1938
