= Adrapsa despecta =

Scientific classification
- Domain: Eukaryota
- Kingdom: Animalia
- Phylum: Arthropoda
- Class: Insecta
- Order: Lepidoptera
- Superfamily: Noctuoidea
- Family: Erebidae
- Genus: Adrapsa
- Species: A. despecta

Binomial name
- Adrapsa despecta (Walker, 1865)

Synonyms
- Thermesia despecta Walker, 1865; Badiza despecta (Walker, 1865); Egnasia nubifascia Hampson, 1893

Species of moth

Adrapsa despecta is a moth of the family Noctuidae. It was first described by Francis Walker in 1865. It is found in India and Sri Lanka.

The wingspan is about 34 mm (1.3 in).
