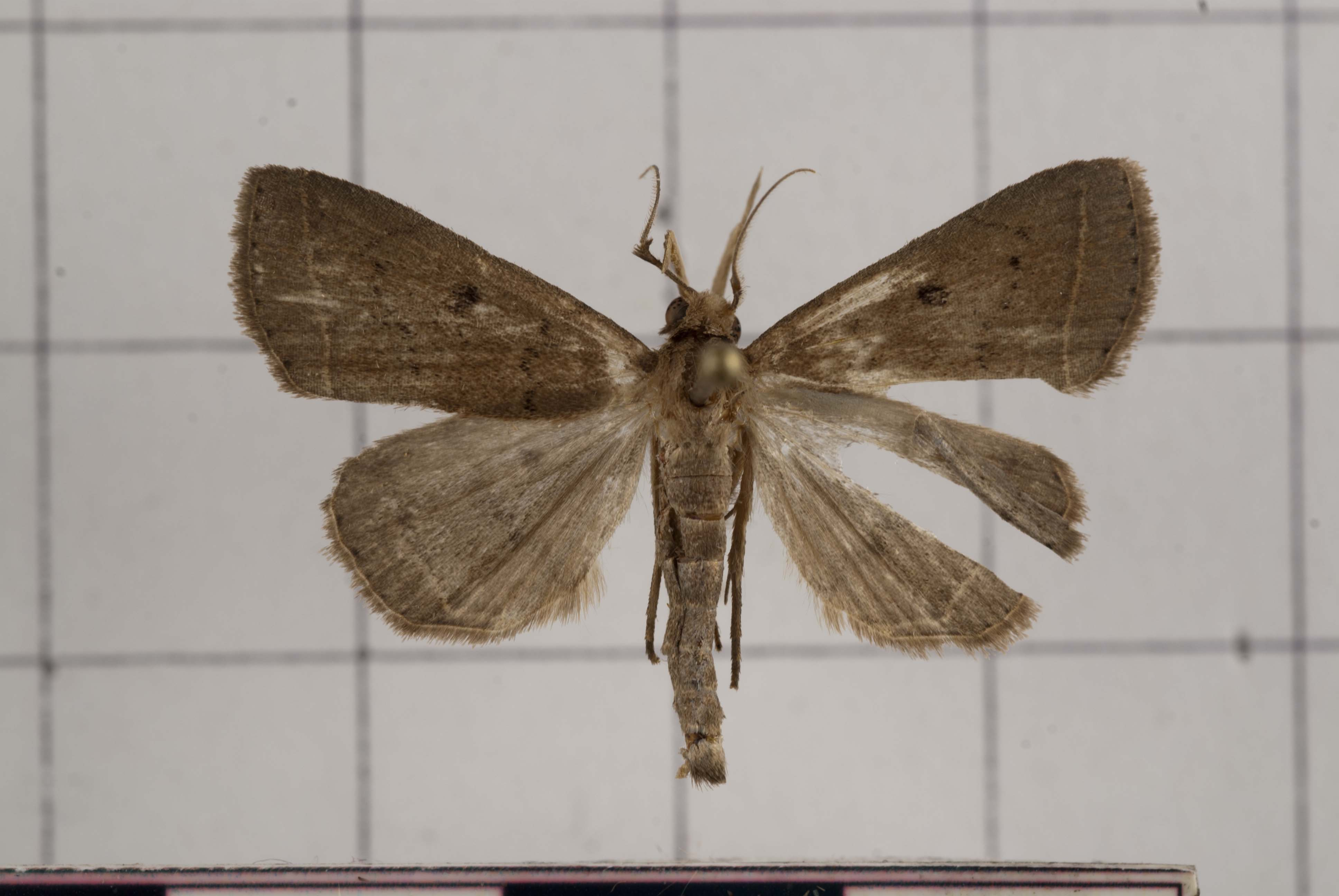

Scientific classification
- Kingdom: Animalia
- Phylum: Arthropoda
- Class: Insecta
- Order: Lepidoptera
- Superfamily: Noctuoidea
- Family: Erebidae
- Genus: Simplicia
- Species: S. butesalis

Binomial name
- Simplicia butesalis Walker, 1859

Synonyms
- Simplicia butesalis Walker, 1859; Libisosa butesalis Walker, 1859; Simplicia macrotheca Prout, 1929

= Simplicia butesalis =

Species of moth

Simplicia butesalis is a moth of the family Erebidae first described by Francis Walker in 1859. It is found in Borneo, Sumatra, Peninsular Malaysia and Sri Lanka.
