= Lysimelia lysimeloides =

Scientific classification
- Kingdom: Animalia
- Phylum: Arthropoda
- Class: Insecta
- Order: Lepidoptera
- Superfamily: Noctuoidea
- Family: Erebidae
- Genus: Lysimelia
- Species: L. lysimeloides

Binomial name
- Lysimelia lysimeloides (Hampson, 1893)

Synonyms
- Zanclognatha lysimeloides Hampson, 1893

Species of moth

Lysimelia lysimeloides is a species of moth in the family Noctuidae. It was first described by George Hampson in 1893 and is found in Sri Lanka.
