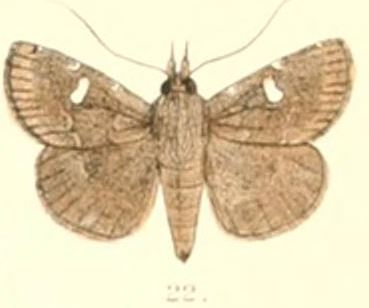

Scientific classification
- Kingdom: Animalia
- Phylum: Arthropoda
- Class: Insecta
- Order: Lepidoptera
- Superfamily: Noctuoidea
- Family: Erebidae
- Genus: Bocana
- Species: B. silenusalis

Binomial name
- Bocana silenusalis Walker, 1858

Synonyms
- Asthala silenusalis Moore, 1882; Thermesia noctinix Walker, 1865

= Bocana silenusalis =

Species of moth

Bocana silenusalis is a moth of the family Erebidae first described by Francis Walker in 1858. It is widespread in Asia from India to Borneo.
