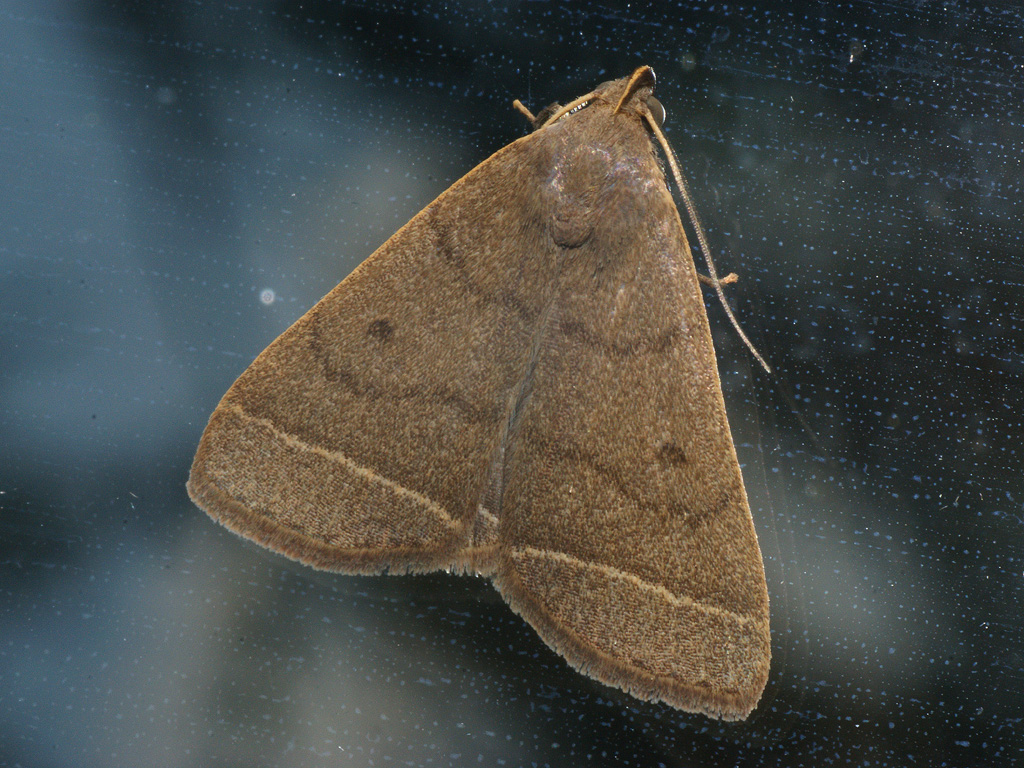

Scientific classification
- Domain: Eukaryota
- Kingdom: Animalia
- Phylum: Arthropoda
- Class: Insecta
- Order: Lepidoptera
- Superfamily: Noctuoidea
- Family: Erebidae
- Genus: Simplicia
- Species: S. rectalis

Binomial name
- Simplicia rectalis (Eversmann, 1842)

= Simplicia rectalis =

Species of moth

Simplicia rectalis is a species of moth belonging to the family Erebidae.

It is native to Europe and Russian Far East.
