= Elusa diloba =

Scientific classification
- Kingdom: Animalia
- Phylum: Arthropoda
- Class: Insecta
- Order: Lepidoptera
- Superfamily: Noctuoidea
- Family: Noctuidae
- Genus: Elusa
- Species: E. diloba

Binomial name
- Elusa diloba Hampson, 1909

Synonyms
- Elusa diloba nigricans Warren, 1913

Species of moth

Elusa diloba is a species of moth of the family Noctuidae. It was described by George Hampson in 1909, and is known from Borneo.
