= Bracharthron =

Scientific classification
- Kingdom: Animalia
- Phylum: Arthropoda
- Class: Insecta
- Order: Lepidoptera
- Superfamily: Noctuoidea
- Family: Erebidae
- Subfamily: Herminiinae
- Genus: Bracharthron; Hampson, 1891

Genus of moths

Bracharthron was a genus of moths of the family Erebidae erected by George Hampson in 1891.

The Global Lepidoptera Names Index and Butterflies and Moths of the World describe it as a synonym of Lysimelia Walker, [1859] but Lepidoptera and Some Other Life Forms describes it as a synonym of Lithilaria Rosenstock, 1885.
