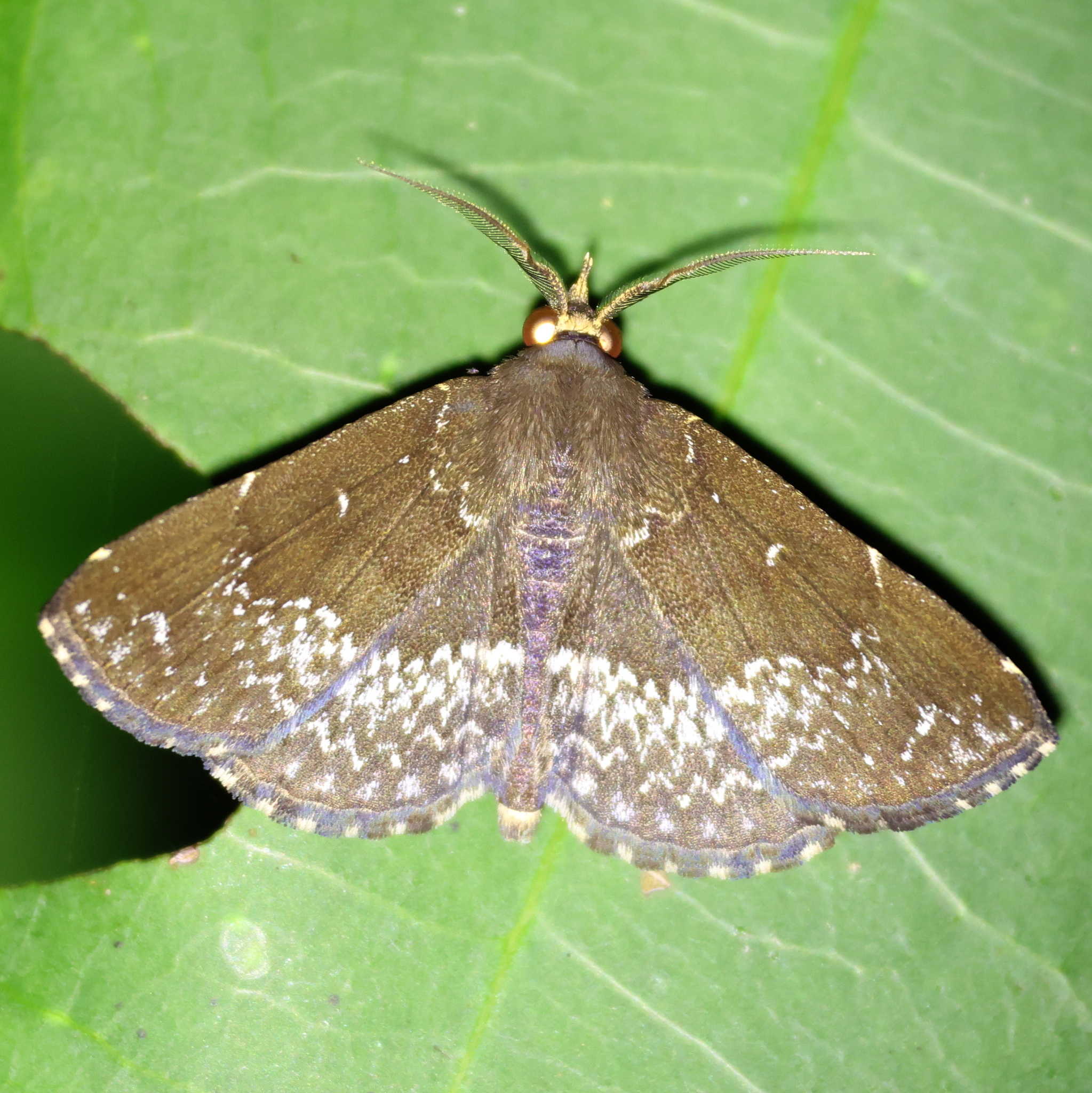
- Kuching, Sarawak, Malaysia (2025)

Scientific classification
- Kingdom: Animalia
- Phylum: Arthropoda
- Class: Insecta
- Order: Lepidoptera
- Superfamily: Noctuoidea
- Family: Erebidae
- Genus: Adrapsa
- Species: A. geometroides

Binomial name
- Adrapsa geometroides (Walker, [1858])

Synonyms
- Lusia geometroides Walker, [1858]; Amilaga geometroides (Walker, 1857)

= Adrapsa geometroides =

Species of moth

Adrapsa geometroides is a moth of the family Noctuidae first described by Francis Walker in 1858. It is found in India, Sri Lanka, Sundaland, the Moluccas, and New Guinea.
