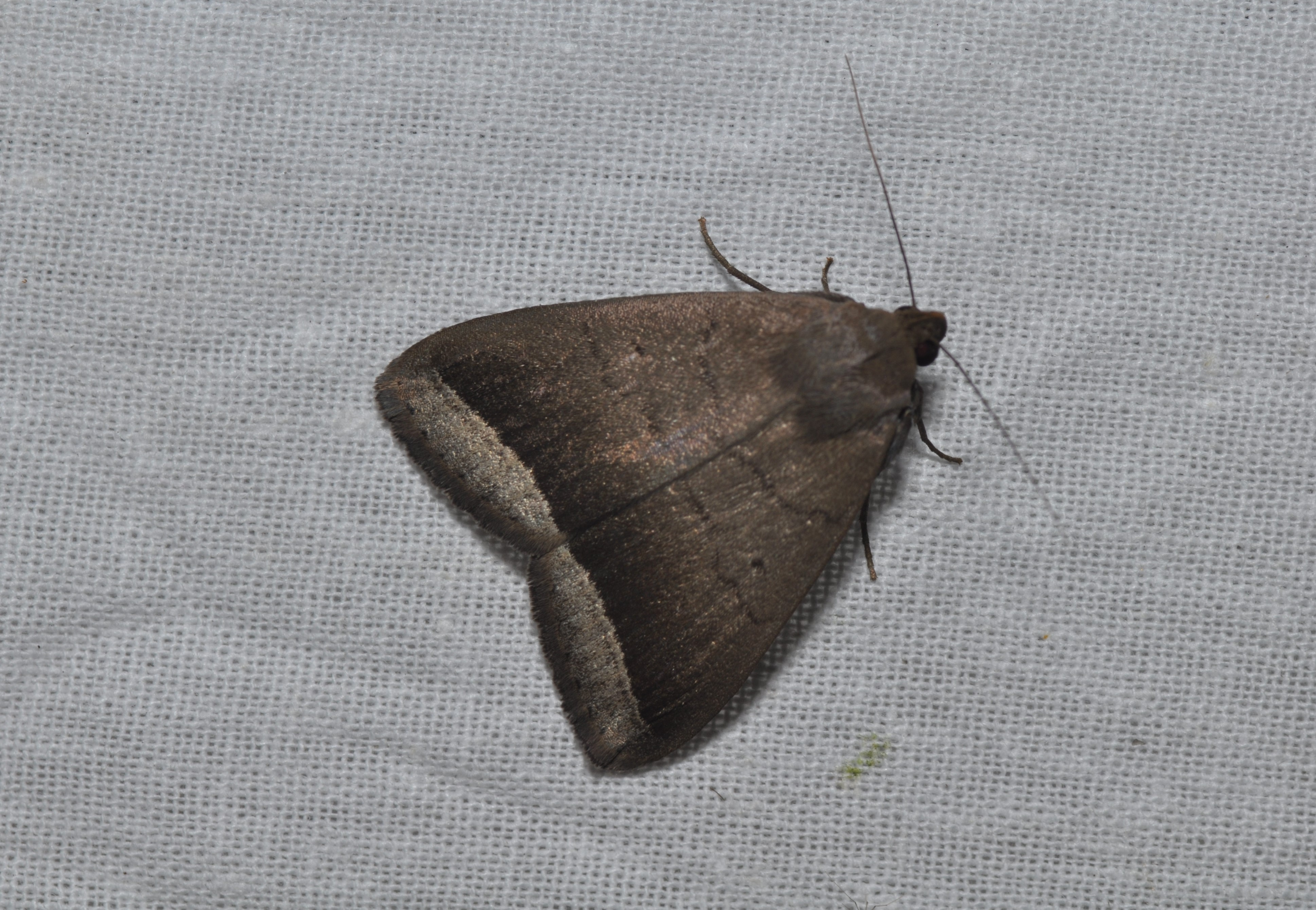

Scientific classification
- Kingdom: Animalia
- Phylum: Arthropoda
- Class: Insecta
- Order: Lepidoptera
- Superfamily: Noctuoidea
- Family: Erebidae
- Genus: Simplicia
- Species: S. bimarginata

Binomial name
- Simplicia bimarginata (Walker, 1864)

Synonyms
- Culicula bimarginata Walker, 1864; Simplicia? infausta Felder & Rogenhofer, 1874

= Simplicia bimarginata =

Species of moth

Simplicia bimarginata is a moth of the family Erebidae first described by Francis Walker in 1864. It is found in India, Sri Lanka, Malaysia, Indonesia, New Guinea, Singapore, Sumatra, Borneo, the Philippines and Sulawesi.

Adult wingspan is 18 mm. Forewing greyish with irregular fasciae. Males have the forewing costa slightly concave. There are pale brown hair-pencils in forelegs. Weak antemedial and post-medial line. Hindwing with a similar sub-marginal line.

== Gallery ==
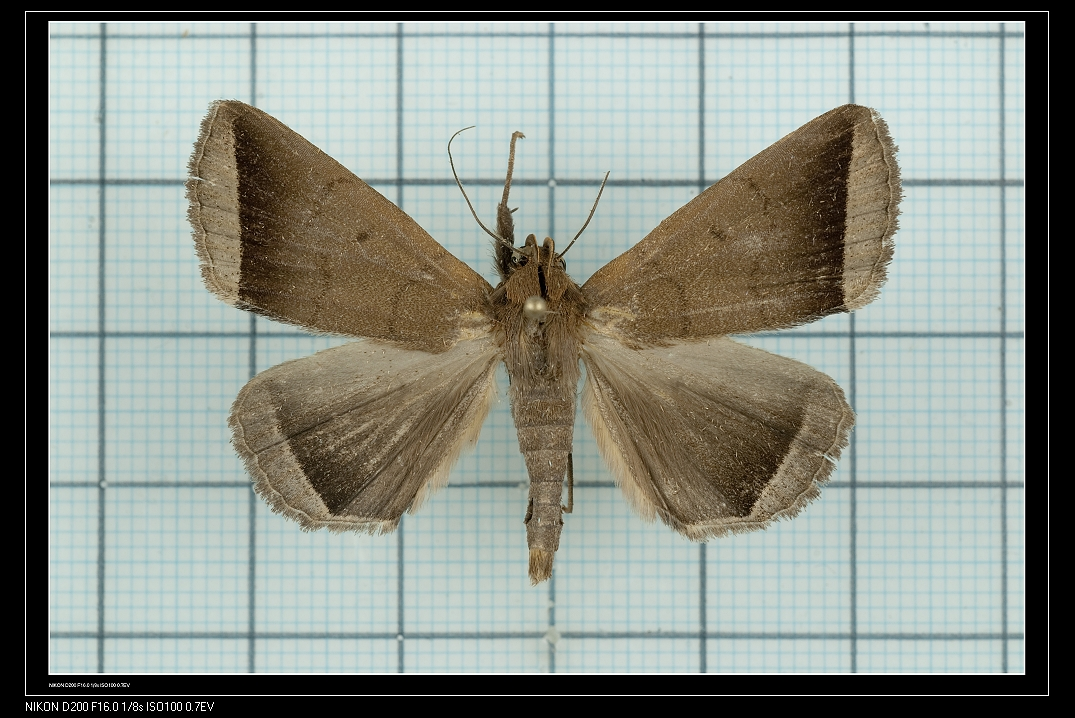

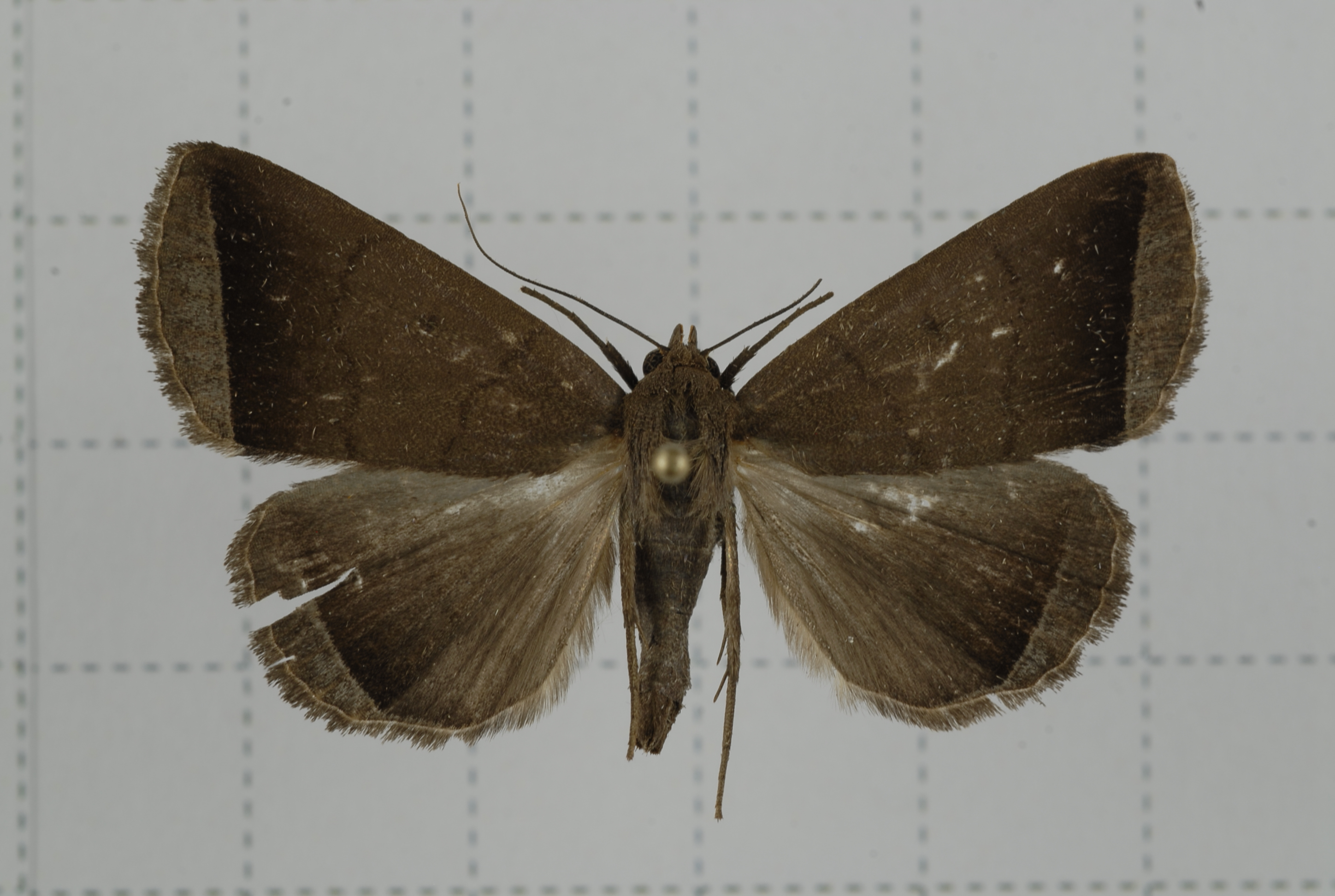

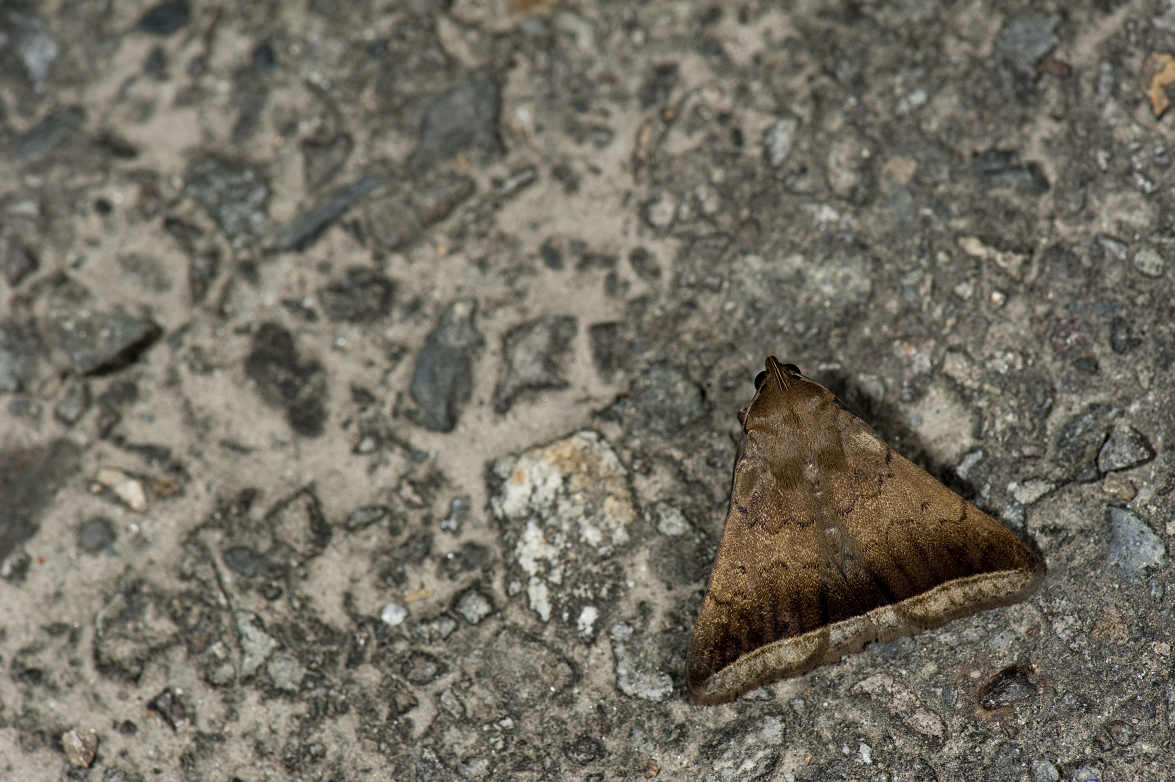

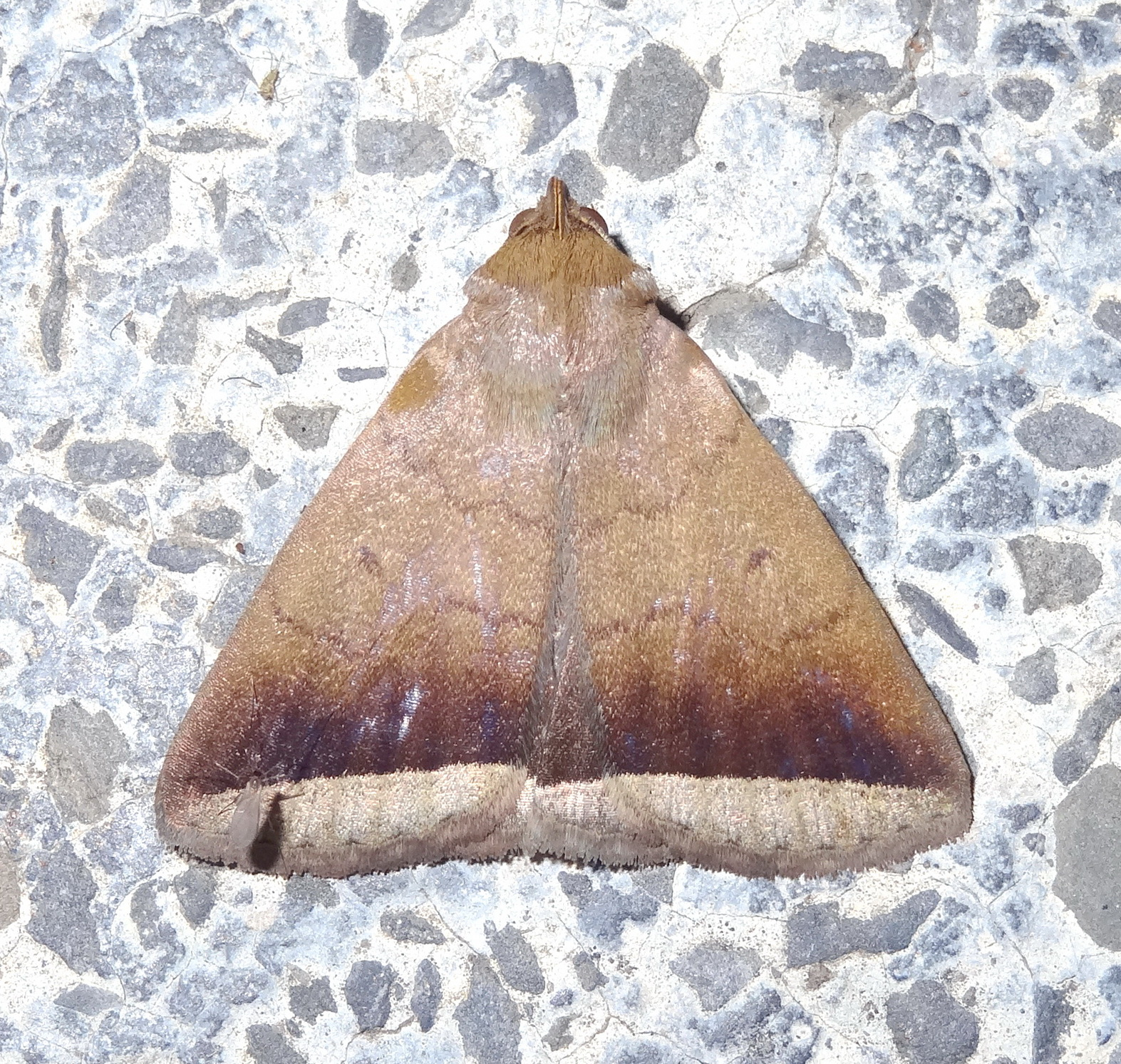
