= Elusa affinis =

Scientific classification
- Kingdom: Animalia
- Phylum: Arthropoda
- Class: Insecta
- Order: Lepidoptera
- Superfamily: Noctuoidea
- Family: Noctuidae
- Genus: Elusa
- Species: E. affinis

Binomial name
- Elusa affinis Rothschild, 1915

Species of moth

Elusa affinis is a species of moth of the family Noctuidae. It was described by Walter Rothschild in 1915 and is known from New Guinea.
