= Elusa binocula =

Scientific classification
- Kingdom: Animalia
- Phylum: Arthropoda
- Class: Insecta
- Order: Lepidoptera
- Superfamily: Noctuoidea
- Family: Noctuidae
- Genus: Elusa
- Species: E. binocula

Binomial name
- Elusa binocula Hampson, 1911

Species of moth

Elusa binocula is a species of moth of the family Noctuidae. It was described by George Hampson in 1911, and is known from New Guinea.
