= Elusa confusa =

Scientific classification
- Domain: Eukaryota
- Kingdom: Animalia
- Phylum: Arthropoda
- Class: Insecta
- Order: Lepidoptera
- Superfamily: Noctuoidea
- Family: Noctuidae
- Genus: Elusa
- Species: E. confusa

Binomial name
- Elusa confusa Warren, 1913

Species of moth

Elusa confusa is a species of moth of the family Noctuidae. It was described by Warren in 1913, and is known from New Guinea.
