= Elusa inventa =

Scientific classification
- Domain: Eukaryota
- Kingdom: Animalia
- Phylum: Arthropoda
- Class: Insecta
- Order: Lepidoptera
- Superfamily: Noctuoidea
- Family: Noctuidae
- Genus: Elusa
- Species: E. inventa

Binomial name
- Elusa inventa Berio, 1977

Species of moth

Elusa inventa is a species of moth of the family Noctuidae. It was described by Emilio Berio in 1977, and is known from China.
