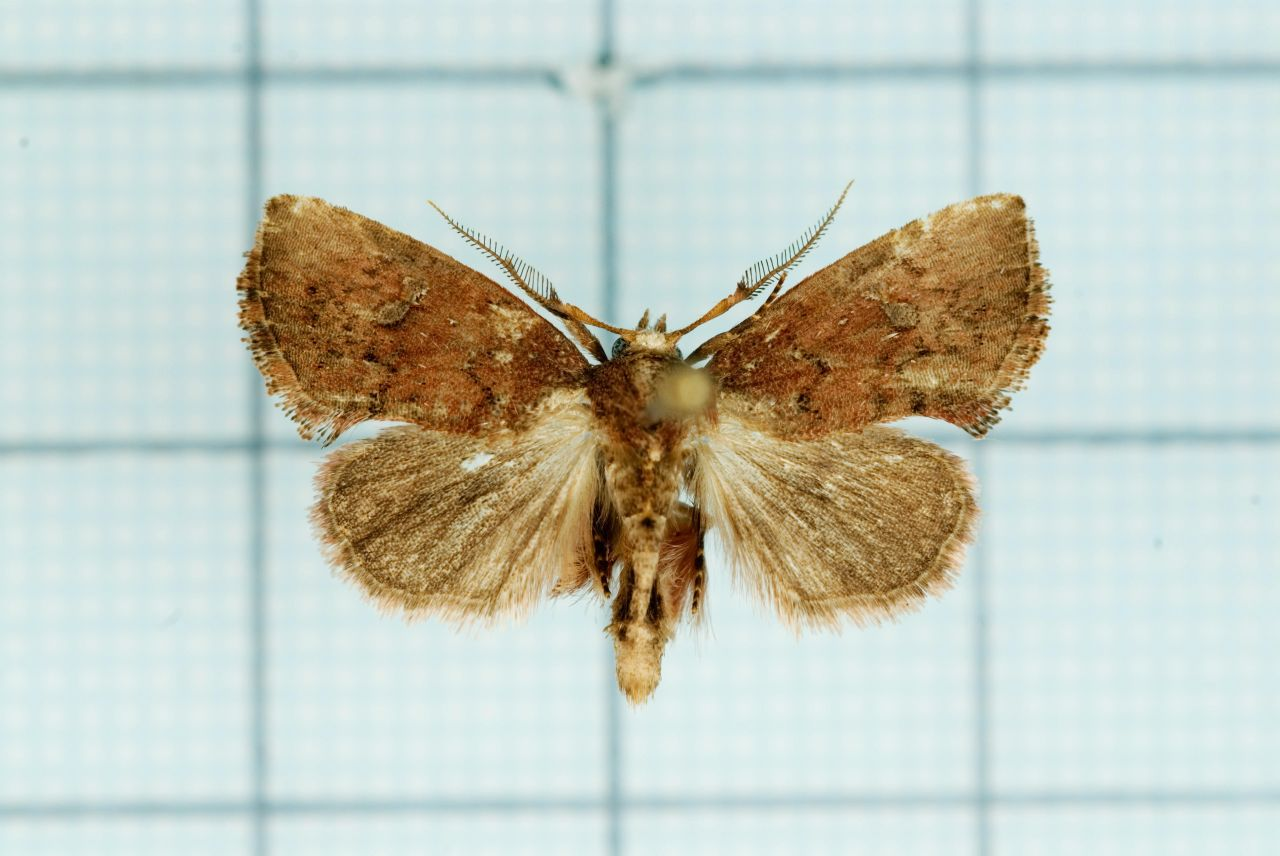

Scientific classification
- Kingdom: Animalia
- Phylum: Arthropoda
- Class: Insecta
- Order: Lepidoptera
- Superfamily: Noctuoidea
- Family: Noctuidae
- Genus: Elusa
- Species: E. ustula

Binomial name
- Elusa ustula Hampson, 1909

Synonyms
- Elusa rufescens Wileman, 1915

= Elusa ustula =

Species of moth

Elusa ustula is a moth of the family Noctuidae. It is found in Peninsular Malaysia, Borneo and Taiwan.

The wingspan is about 19 mm.
