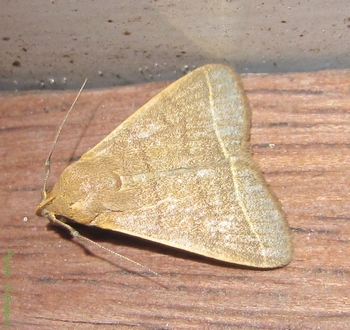

Scientific classification
- Kingdom: Animalia
- Phylum: Arthropoda
- Class: Insecta
- Order: Lepidoptera
- Superfamily: Noctuoidea
- Family: Erebidae
- Subfamily: Herminiinae
- Genus: Simplicia; Guenée, 1854

Synonyms
- Libisosa Walker, 1859; Culicula Walker, 1863; Aginna Walker, 1865; Nabartha Moore, 1885

= Simplicia (moth) =

Genus of moths

Simplicia is a genus of litter moths of the family Erebidae. The genus was erected by Achille Guenée in 1854.

== Description ==
Its palpi are sickle shaped, with the second joint reaching above the vertex of the head. Third joint long and naked. Antennae minutely ciliated in male. Thorax and abdomen smoothly scaled. Fore tibia of male covered by a sheath containing masses of flocculent (wooly) scales. Forewings with somewhat acute apex. Areole very narrow with vein 10 given off far beyond it in male and from it in female. The discocellulars almost obsolete. Hindwings with vein 5 from near lower angle of cell.

== Species ==
- Simplicia anoecta
- Simplicia aperta
- Simplicia armatalis (Walker, 1866)
- Simplicia aroa
- Simplicia bimarginata (Walker, 1864)
- Simplicia brevicosta
- Simplicia buffetti
- Simplicia butesalis (Walker, 1858)
- Simplicia caeneusalis (Walker, 1859)
- Simplicia capalis
- Simplicia clarilinea
- Simplicia cornicalis (Fabricius, 1794) (syn: Simplicia caeneusalis (Walker, [1859]))
- Simplicia discosticta
- Simplicia erebina (Butler, 1887)
- Simplicia eriodes
- Simplicia extinctalis (Zeller, 1852)
- Simplicia fesseleti Guillermet, 2005
- Simplicia floccosa
- Simplicia inarcualis
- Simplicia inareolalis
- Simplicia inflexalis Guenée, 1854
- Simplicia kebeae
- Simplicia lautokiensis
- Simplicia limbosalis
- Simplicia macrotheca
- Simplicia medioangulata
- Simplicia mesotheca
- Simplicia minoralis
- Simplicia mistacalis Guenée, 1854
- Simplicia monocaula
- Simplicia moorei Swinhoe, 1919
- Simplicia murinalis
- Simplicia nitida
- Simplicia notata
- Simplicia obiana
- Simplicia obscura
- Simplicia pachyceviua
- Simplicia pannalis Guenée, 1862
- Simplicia periplocalis (Mabille, 1880)
- Simplicia pseudeusalis Holloway, 2008
- Simplicia pseudoniphona
- Simplicia purpuralis
- Simplicia rectalis Eversmann, 1842
- Simplicia renota
- Simplicia robustalis Guenée, 1854
- Simplicia rufa A. E. Prout, 1929
- Simplicia ryukyuensis
- Simplicia siamensis
- Simplicia sicca
- Simplicia simplicissima
- Simplicia simulata
- Simplicia solomonensis
- Simplicia stictogramma
- Simplicia subterminalis
- Simplicia toma
- Simplicia tonsealis
- Simplicia trilineata
- Simplicia turpatalis
- Simplicia undicosta
- Simplicia xanthoma Prout, 1928
- Simplicia zanclognathalis
