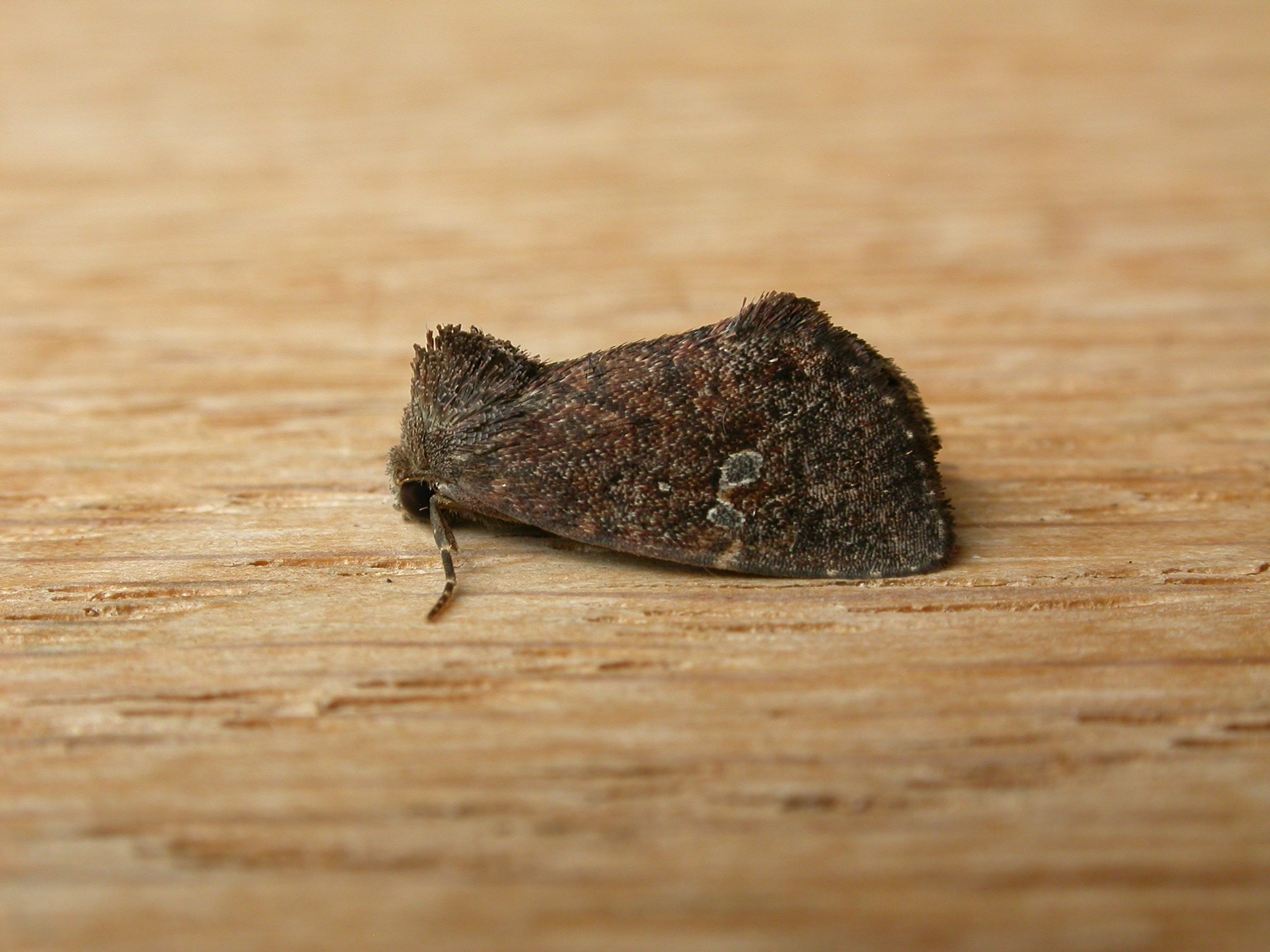
- Elusa oenolopha

Scientific classification
- Domain: Eukaryota
- Kingdom: Animalia
- Phylum: Arthropoda
- Class: Insecta
- Order: Lepidoptera
- Superfamily: Noctuoidea
- Family: Noctuidae
- Genus: Elusa; Walker, [1859]

Synonyms
- Alimala Walker, 1862; Seria Walker, 1862; Penza Walker, [1863]; Lugana Moore, 1882; Desana C. Swinhoe, 1900

= Elusa (moth) =

Genus of moths

Elusa is a genus of moths of the family Noctuidae erected by Francis Walker in 1859.

== Description ==
Its eyes are naked and without lashes. The proboscis is well developed. Palpi obliquely upturned, where the second joint reaching vertex of head and roughly scaled. Third joint is short. Antennae of male bipectinated, where branches bent round and almost forming a cylinder just before the middle, where the shaft is contorted and the branches form a large hollow cup, after which they gradually diminish to apex. Thorax tuftless. Abdomen with dorsal tufts. Legs with dense hairy tibia. Hindlegs are clothed with very long hair to the end of tarsi. Forewings with non-crenulate cilia, where the inner margin lobed at base. There are long scaly tufts at outer angle.

== Species ==
- Elusa affinis Rothschild, 1915
- Elusa alector Wileman & West, 1928
- Elusa antennata (Moore, 1882)
- Elusa binocula Hampson, 1911
- Elusa ceneusalis Walker, [1859]
- Elusa confusa Warren, 1913
- Elusa cyathicornis (Walker, 1862)
- Elusa diloba Hampson, 1909
- Elusa dinawa Bethune-Baker, 1906
- Elusa duplicata Warren, 1913
- Elusa flammans Warren, 1913
- Elusa ignea Warren, 1913
- Elusa incertans Bethune-Baker, 1906
- Elusa inventa Berio, 1977
- Elusa mediorufa Hampson, 1909
- Elusa oenolopha Turner, 1902
- Elusa orion Roepke, 1956
- Elusa penanorum Holloway, 1989
- Elusa peninsulata (Walker, 1865)
- Elusa pratti Bethune-Baker, 1906
- Elusa puncticeps (Walker, 1863)
- Elusa purpurea Warren, 1913
- Elusa pyrrhobaphes (Turner, 1943)
- Elusa semipecten C. Swinhoe, 1901
- Elusa simplex Warren, 1913
- Elusa subjecta (Walker, 1865)
- Elusa temburong Holloway, 1989
- Elusa ustula Hampson, 1909
