= Elusa antennata =

Scientific classification
- Domain: Eukaryota
- Kingdom: Animalia
- Phylum: Arthropoda
- Class: Insecta
- Order: Lepidoptera
- Superfamily: Noctuoidea
- Family: Noctuidae
- Genus: Elusa
- Species: E. antennata

Binomial name
- Elusa antennata (Moore, 1882)

Synonyms
- Lugana antennata Moore, 1882

Species of moth

Elusa antennata is a species of moth of the family Noctuidae. It was described by Frederic Moore in 1882. It is found in the north-eastern Himalaya.
