= Elusa cyathicornis =

Scientific classification
- Kingdom: Animalia
- Phylum: Arthropoda
- Class: Insecta
- Order: Lepidoptera
- Superfamily: Noctuoidea
- Family: Noctuidae
- Genus: Elusa
- Species: E. cyathicornis

Binomial name
- Elusa cyathicornis (Walker, 1862)

Synonyms
- Seria cyathicornis Walker, 1862

Species of moth

Elusa cyathicornis is a species of moth of the family Noctuidae. It was described by Francis Walker in 1862 and is known from Borneo.
