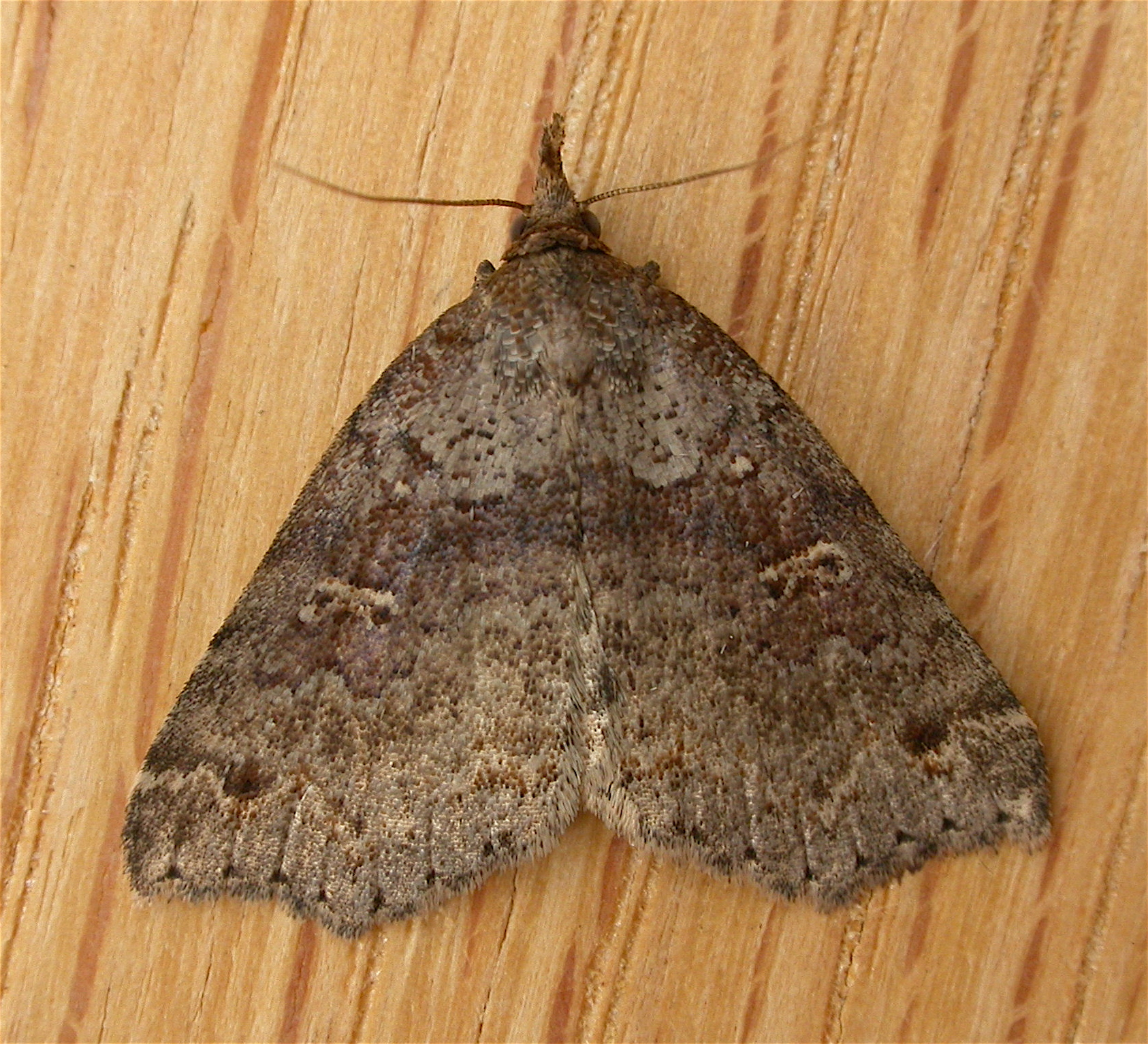

Scientific classification
- Domain: Eukaryota
- Kingdom: Animalia
- Phylum: Arthropoda
- Class: Insecta
- Order: Lepidoptera
- Superfamily: Noctuoidea
- Family: Erebidae
- Subfamily: Hypeninae
- Genus: Lithilaria; Rosenstock, 1885

Synonyms
- Hyperaucha Meyrick, 1897; Bracharthron Hampson, 1891

= Lithilaria =

Genus of moths

Lithilaria is a genus of moths of the family Noctuidae. The genus was erected by Rudolph Rosenstock in 1885.

== Species ==
- Lithilaria anomozancla (Turner, 1944) Queensland
- Lithilaria cautiperas (Hampson, 1912) Sri Lanka
- Lithilaria maculapex (Hampson, 1891) India
- Lithilaria melanostrotum (Turner, 1906) Australia
- Lithilaria ossicolor Rosenstock, 1885 Australia
- Lithilaria proestans (T. P. Lucas, 1895) Australia, New Zealand
- Lithilaria punctilinea (Wileman, 1915) Taiwan
