= Elusa orion =

Scientific classification
- Domain: Eukaryota
- Kingdom: Animalia
- Phylum: Arthropoda
- Class: Insecta
- Order: Lepidoptera
- Superfamily: Noctuoidea
- Family: Noctuidae
- Genus: Elusa
- Species: E. orion

Binomial name
- Elusa orion Roepke, 1956

Species of moth

Elusa orion is a species of moth of the family Noctuidae. It was described by Walter Karl Johann Roepke in 1956, and is known from New Guinea.
