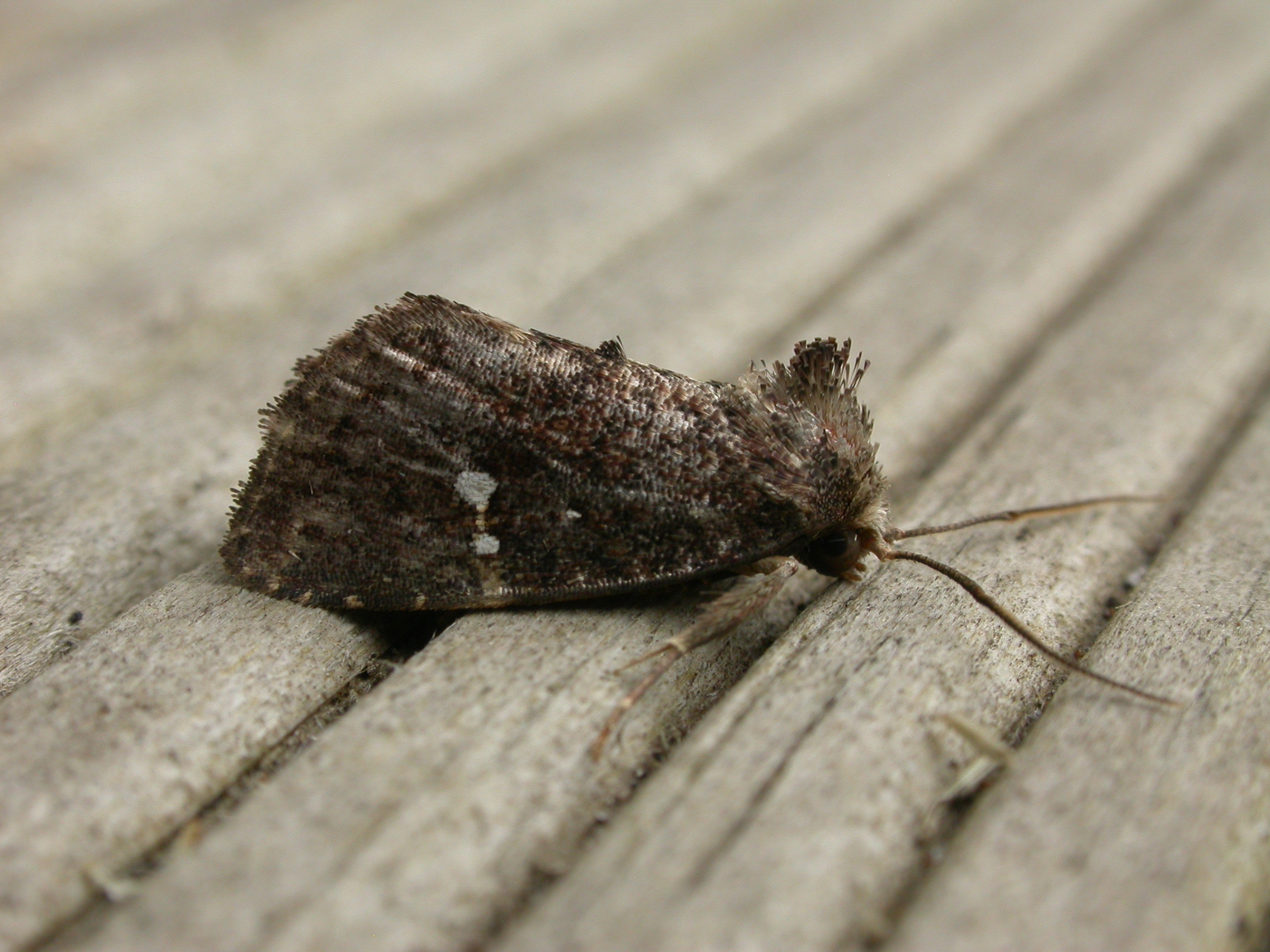

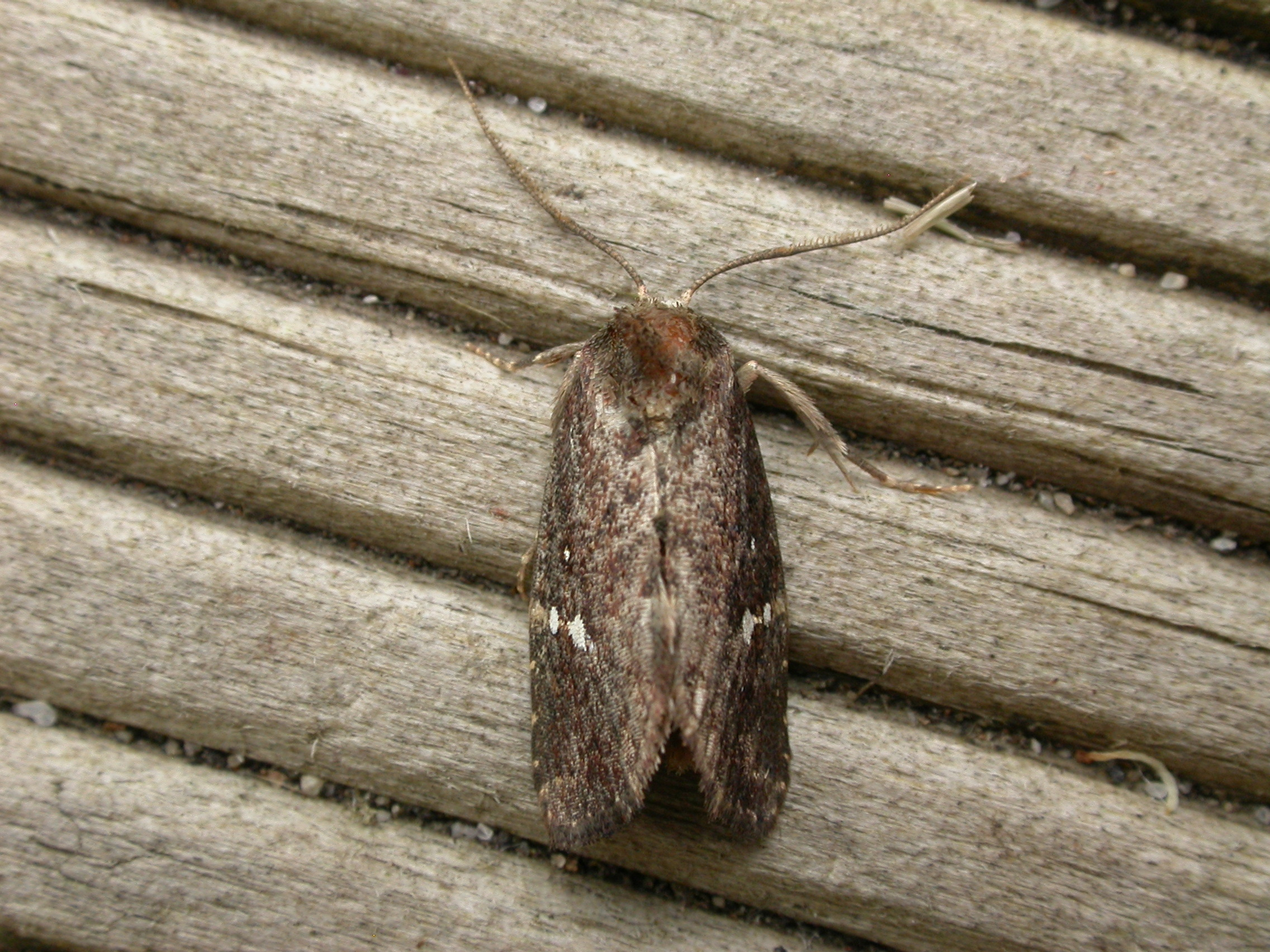

Scientific classification
- Kingdom: Animalia
- Phylum: Arthropoda
- Clade: Pancrustacea
- Class: Insecta
- Order: Lepidoptera
- Superfamily: Noctuoidea
- Family: Noctuidae
- Genus: Elusa
- Species: E. semipecten

Binomial name
- Elusa semipecten C. Swinhoe, 1901

= Elusa semipecten =

Species of moth

Elusa semipecten is a species of moth of the family Noctuidae first described by Charles Swinhoe in 1901. It is found in the Australian states of New South Wales and Queensland.

The forewings are brown with a small mark near the middle of each forewing. The hindwings are pale brown.
