= Elusa subjecta =

Scientific classification
- Kingdom: Animalia
- Phylum: Arthropoda
- Class: Insecta
- Order: Lepidoptera
- Superfamily: Noctuoidea
- Family: Noctuidae
- Genus: Elusa
- Species: E. subjecta

Binomial name
- Elusa subjecta (Walker, 1865)

Synonyms
- Miana? subjecta Walker, 1865; Phothedes bipars Moore, 1881; Lugana renalis Moore, 1882; Lugana rufula Hampson, 1891

Species of moth

Elusa subjecta is a moth of the family Noctuidae first described by Francis Walker in 1865. It is found in Sri Lanka, India and the Andaman Islands.
