= Elusa mediorufa =

Scientific classification
- Kingdom: Animalia
- Phylum: Arthropoda
- Class: Insecta
- Order: Lepidoptera
- Superfamily: Noctuoidea
- Family: Noctuidae
- Genus: Elusa
- Species: E. mediorufa

Binomial name
- Elusa mediorufa Hampson, 1909

Species of moth

Elusa mediorufa is a species of moth of the family Noctuidae. It was described by George Hampson in 1909 and is known from Borneo.

The forewings are pale brown. The margins are dark.
