= Auchmophanes =

Scientific classification
- Domain: Eukaryota
- Kingdom: Animalia
- Phylum: Arthropoda
- Class: Insecta
- Order: Lepidoptera
- Superfamily: Noctuoidea
- Family: Erebidae
- Subfamily: Hypeninae
- Genus: Auchmophanes; Turner, 1908

Synonyms
- Saroptila Turner, 1909

Genus of moths

Auchmophanes is a genus of moths of the family Erebidae. The genus was described by Turner in 1908. All three are known from the Australian state of Queensland.

== Species ==
- Auchmophanes megalosara (Turner, 1909)
- Auchmophanes ochrospila Turner, 1908
- Auchmophanes platysara (Turner, 1929)
