= Elusa alector =

Scientific classification
- Domain: Eukaryota
- Kingdom: Animalia
- Phylum: Arthropoda
- Class: Insecta
- Order: Lepidoptera
- Superfamily: Noctuoidea
- Family: Noctuidae
- Genus: Elusa
- Species: E. alector

Binomial name
- Elusa alector Wileman & West, 1928

Species of moth

Elusa alector is a species of moth of the family Noctuidae. It was described by Alfred Ernest Wileman and Reginald James West in 1928, and is known from the Philippines, including Luzon.
