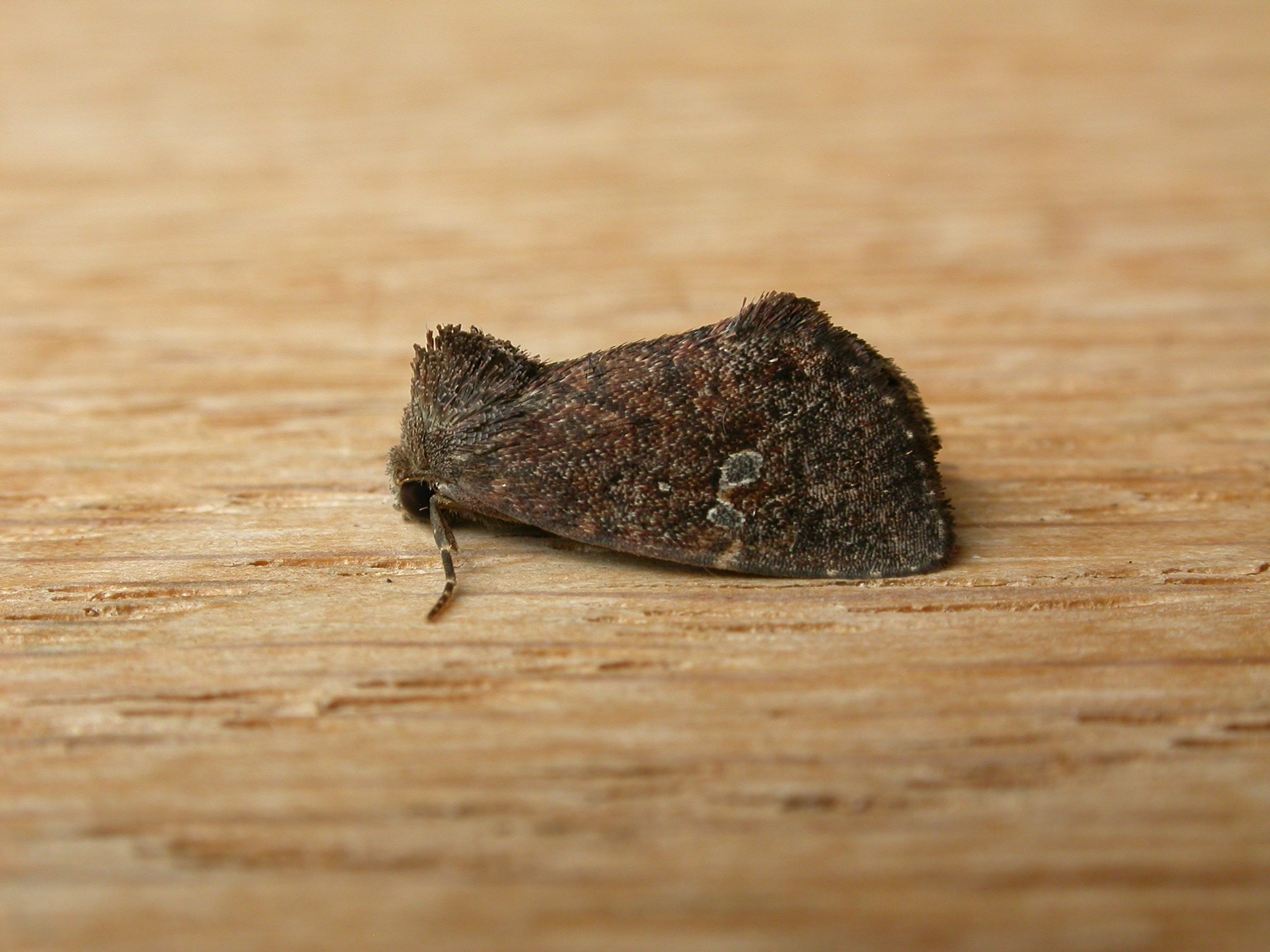

Scientific classification
- Domain: Eukaryota
- Kingdom: Animalia
- Phylum: Arthropoda
- Class: Insecta
- Order: Lepidoptera
- Superfamily: Noctuoidea
- Family: Noctuidae
- Genus: Elusa
- Species: E. oenolopha

Binomial name
- Elusa oenolopha Turner, 1902

Synonyms
- Elusa oenolopha leucoplaga Warren, 1913; Elusa oenolopha rufaria Warren, 1913

= Elusa oenolopha =

Species of moth

Elusa oenolopha is a species of moth of the family Noctuidae. It is known from Australia, including Queensland and New South Wales.

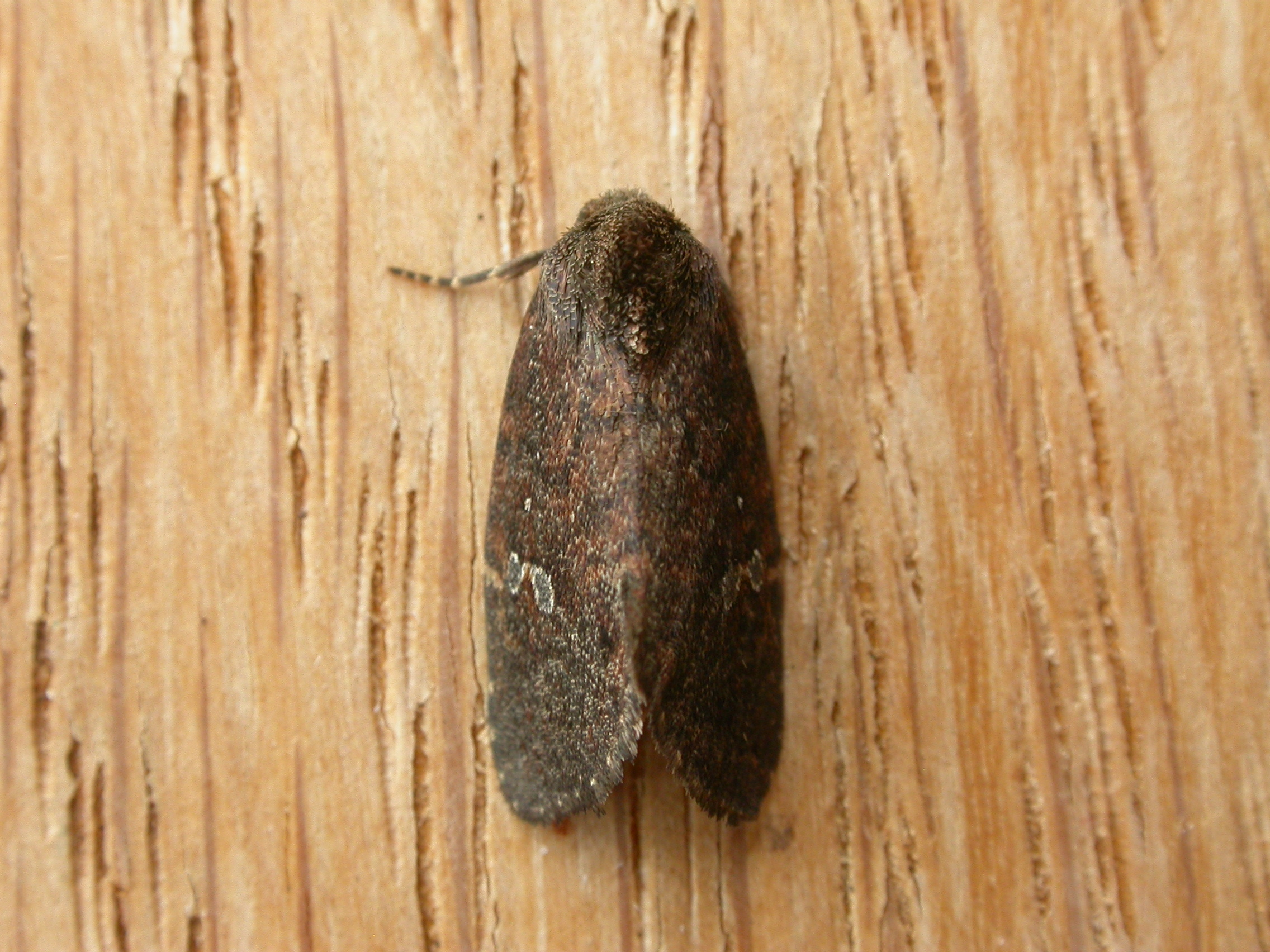
