= Elusa incertans =

Scientific classification
- Domain: Eukaryota
- Kingdom: Animalia
- Phylum: Arthropoda
- Class: Insecta
- Order: Lepidoptera
- Superfamily: Noctuoidea
- Family: Noctuidae
- Genus: Elusa
- Species: E. incertans

Binomial name
- Elusa incertans Bethune-Baker, 1906

Species of moth

Elusa incertans is a species of moth of the family Noctuidae. It was described by George Thomas Bethune-Baker in 1906, and is known from New Guinea.
