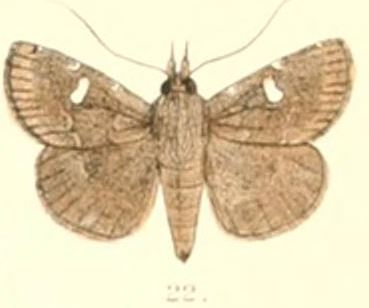

Scientific classification
- Kingdom: Animalia
- Phylum: Arthropoda
- Class: Insecta
- Order: Lepidoptera
- Superfamily: Noctuoidea
- Family: Erebidae
- Subfamily: Herminiinae
- Genus: Bocana; Walker, 1859

Synonyms
- Lamura Walker, 1859; Bithiasa Walker, 1865; Asthala Moore, 1882

= Bocana =

Genus of moths

Bocana is a genus of moths of the family Erebidae. The genus was erected by Francis Walker in 1859.

== Species ==
- Bocana alpipalpalis (Pagenstecher, 1884)
- Bocana linusalis Walker, [1859]
- Bocana longicornis Holloway, 2008
- Bocana manifestalis Walker, 1858
- Bocana marginata (Leech, 1900)
- Bocana silenusalis Walker, 1859
- Bocana umbrina Tams, 1924
