= Simplicia extinctalis =

Scientific classification
- Kingdom: Animalia
- Phylum: Arthropoda
- Clade: Pancrustacea
- Class: Insecta
- Order: Lepidoptera
- Superfamily: Noctuoidea
- Family: Erebidae
- Genus: Simplicia
- Species: S. extinctalis

Binomial name
- Simplicia extinctalis (Zeller, 1852)

Synonyms
- Herminia extinctalis Zeller, 1852; Sophronia capalis Walker, 1859; Simplicia inarcualis Guenée, 1854

Species of moth

Simplicia extinctalis is a litter moth of the family Erebidae. It is found in most countries of subtropical Africa, from Sierra Leone to Somalia and from Ethiopia to South Africa, including some islands of the Atlantic Ocean and Indian Ocean, as well as in Yemen.
