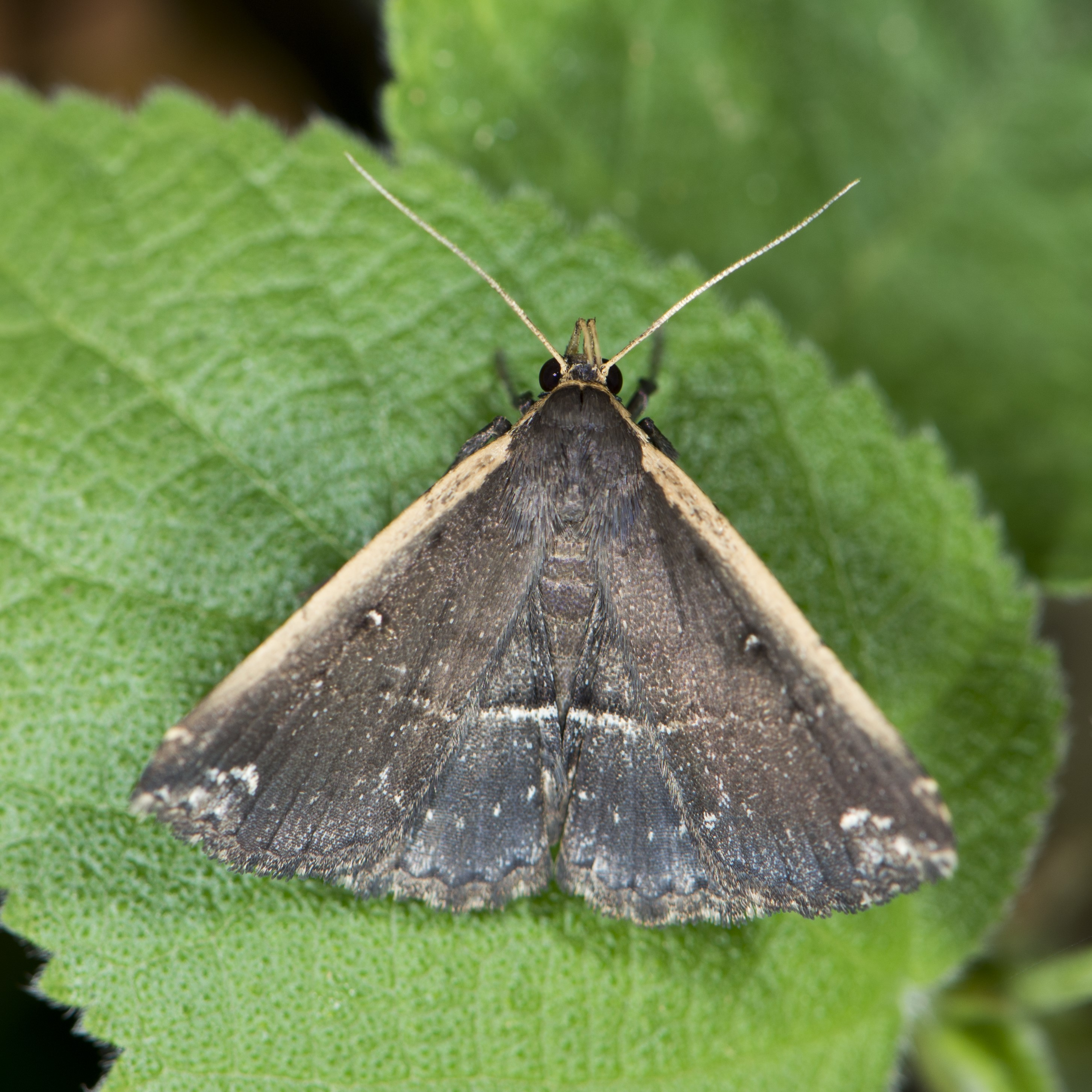

Scientific classification
- Kingdom: Animalia
- Phylum: Arthropoda
- Clade: Pancrustacea
- Class: Insecta
- Order: Lepidoptera
- Superfamily: Noctuoidea
- Family: Erebidae
- Genus: Adrapsa
- Species: A. ablualis

Binomial name
- Adrapsa ablualis Walker, 1859

Synonyms
- Bocana titysusalis Walker, 1859; Herminia semicircularis Lucas, 1892

= Adrapsa ablualis =

Species of moth

Adrapsa ablualis is a species of moth in the family Erebidae. It was described by Francis Walker in 1859. It is widespread in southern (India, Sri Lanka) and eastern Asia (China, Taiwan, Japan) through Southeast Asia to New Caledonia and Australia (Queensland, Northern Territory).

== Description ==
The wingspan of the male is 32 mm and the female is 36 mm. Male with a tuft of long hair from the base of second joint of palpi. Antennae of male with uniseriate pectinations. Antemedial and postmedial lines of forewings and sinuous submarginal line are white, where the first two are straighter. There is a white speck found at center and spot at end of cell. Hindwings with white base. Ventral side with basal area of both wings speckled with white.
