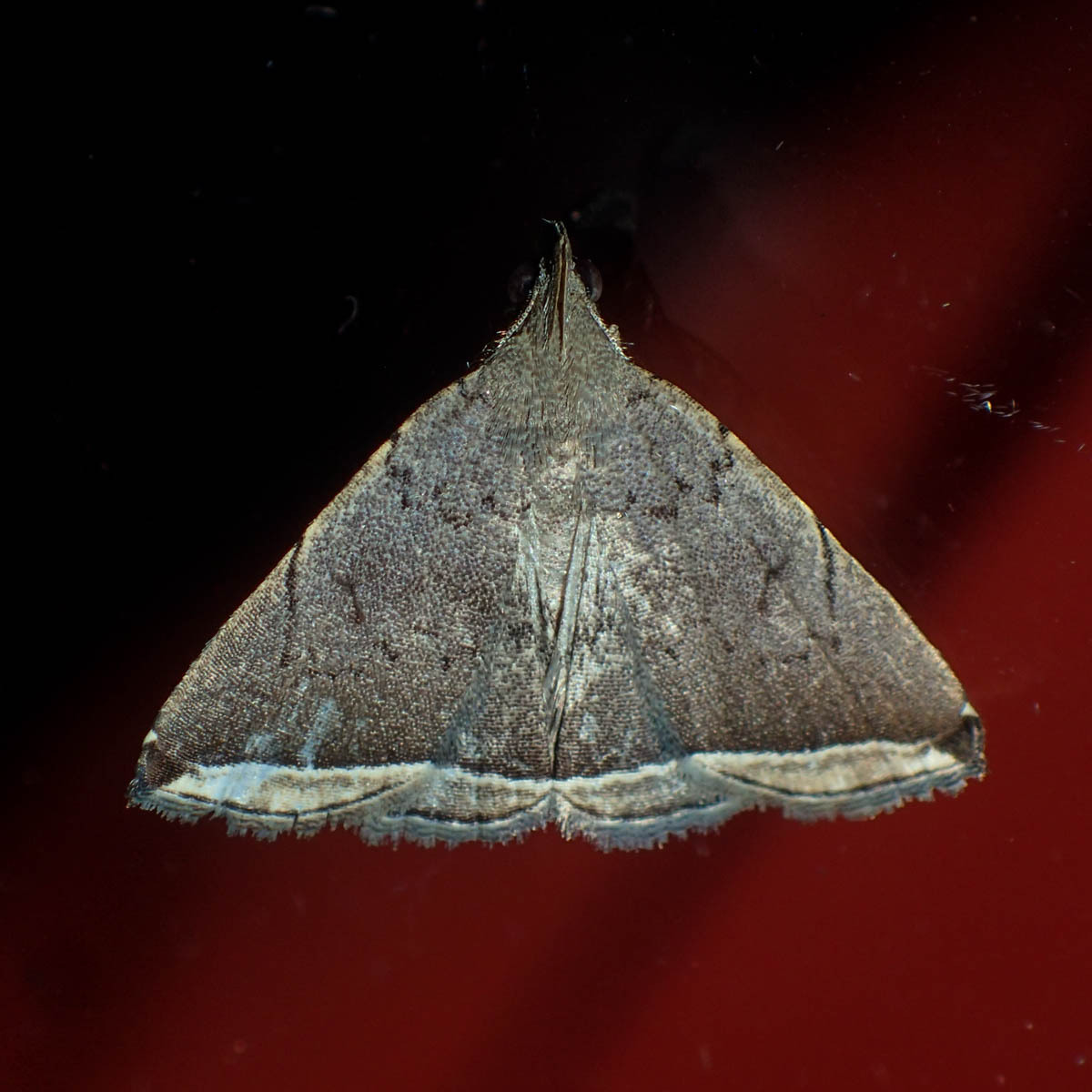
- Lysimelia alstoni

Scientific classification
- Kingdom: Animalia
- Phylum: Arthropoda
- Class: Insecta
- Order: Lepidoptera
- Superfamily: Noctuoidea
- Family: Erebidae
- Subfamily: Hypeninae
- Genus: Lysimelia; Walker, [1859]

Synonyms
- Bracharthron Hampson, 1891

= Lysimelia =

Genus of moths

Lysimelia is a genus of moths of the family Noctuidae. The genus was erected by Francis Walker in 1859.

== Species ==
- Lysimelia alborenalis Roepke, 1938 Sulawesi
- Lysimelia alstoni Holloway, 1979 Sri Lanka
- Lysimelia kona (C. Swinhoe, 1902) Peninsular Malaysia, Borneo
- Lysimelia lenis (T. P. Lucas, 1898) New Caledonia, Queensland
- Lysimelia lysimeloides (Hampson, 1893) Sri Lanka
- Lysimelia neleusalis Walker, [1859] Oriental Tropics - Sumatra, Borneo
- Lysimelia nigripes (Hampson, 1895) Sikkim, Myanmar
- Lysimelia ochreipes Prout, 1932 Sumatra, Peninsular Malaysia, Borneo
- Lysimelia phineusalis (Walker, [1859]) Peninsular Malaysia, Borneo, Natuna Islands
- Lysimelia silvialis (Walker, [1859]) Borneo, Peninsular Malaysia, Sumatra, Bali
