= Adrapsa scopigera =

Scientific classification
- Kingdom: Animalia
- Phylum: Arthropoda
- Class: Insecta
- Order: Lepidoptera
- Superfamily: Noctuoidea
- Family: Erebidae
- Genus: Adrapsa
- Species: A. scopigera

Binomial name
- Adrapsa scopigera (Moore, 1885)

Synonyms
- Egnasia scopigera Moore, 1885; Rhinognatha scopigera (Moore, 1885)

Species of moth

Adrapsa scopigera or Rhinognatha scopigera is a moth of the family Noctuidae first described by Frederic Moore in 1885. It is found in Sri Lanka.

The wingspan is 32 mm (1 1/4 in).
