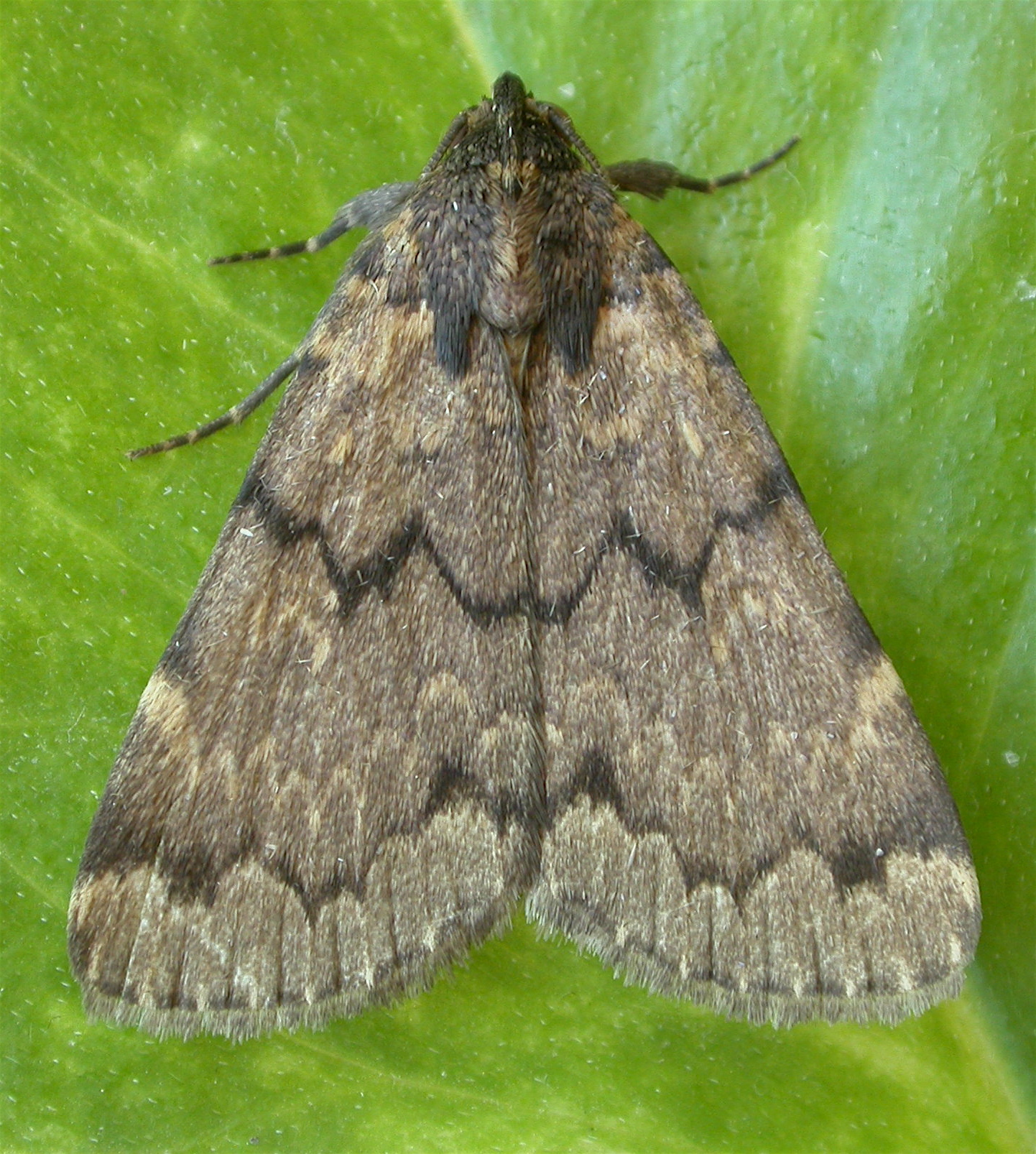
- Mormoscopa phricozona (Turner, 1902), Reid, ACT, 26 December 2007

Scientific classification
- Kingdom: Animalia
- Phylum: Arthropoda
- Class: Insecta
- Order: Lepidoptera
- Superfamily: Noctuoidea
- Family: Erebidae
- Subfamily: Herminiinae
- Genus: Mormoscopa; Meyrick, 1897

= Mormoscopa =

Genus of moths

Mormoscopa is a genus of moths of the family Noctuidae.

== Species ==
- Mormoscopa phricozona (Turner, 1902)
- Mormoscopa sordescens (Rosenstock, 1885)
