= Elusa ceneusalis =

Scientific classification
- Kingdom: Animalia
- Phylum: Arthropoda
- Class: Insecta
- Order: Lepidoptera
- Superfamily: Noctuoidea
- Family: Noctuidae
- Genus: Elusa
- Species: E. ceneusalis

Binomial name
- Elusa ceneusalis Walker, [1859]

Synonyms
- Alimala limacodoides Walker, 1862; Plusia invicta Walker, 1863; Callopistria furunculoides Pagenstecher, 1900; Adrapsa basiferruginea Rothschild, 1920; Elusa particolor Warren, 1913; Elusa stigmatica Warren, 1913; Elusa cenusalis gigantea Prout, 1926

Species of moth

Elusa ceneusalis is a species of moth of the family Noctuidae. It was described by Francis Walker in 1859 and is known from Sundaland, the Philippines, Sulawesi, Queensland, and the Bismarck Islands.

The forewings are darkish grey brown with a pale, straight submarginal line. The hindwings are plain brown.
