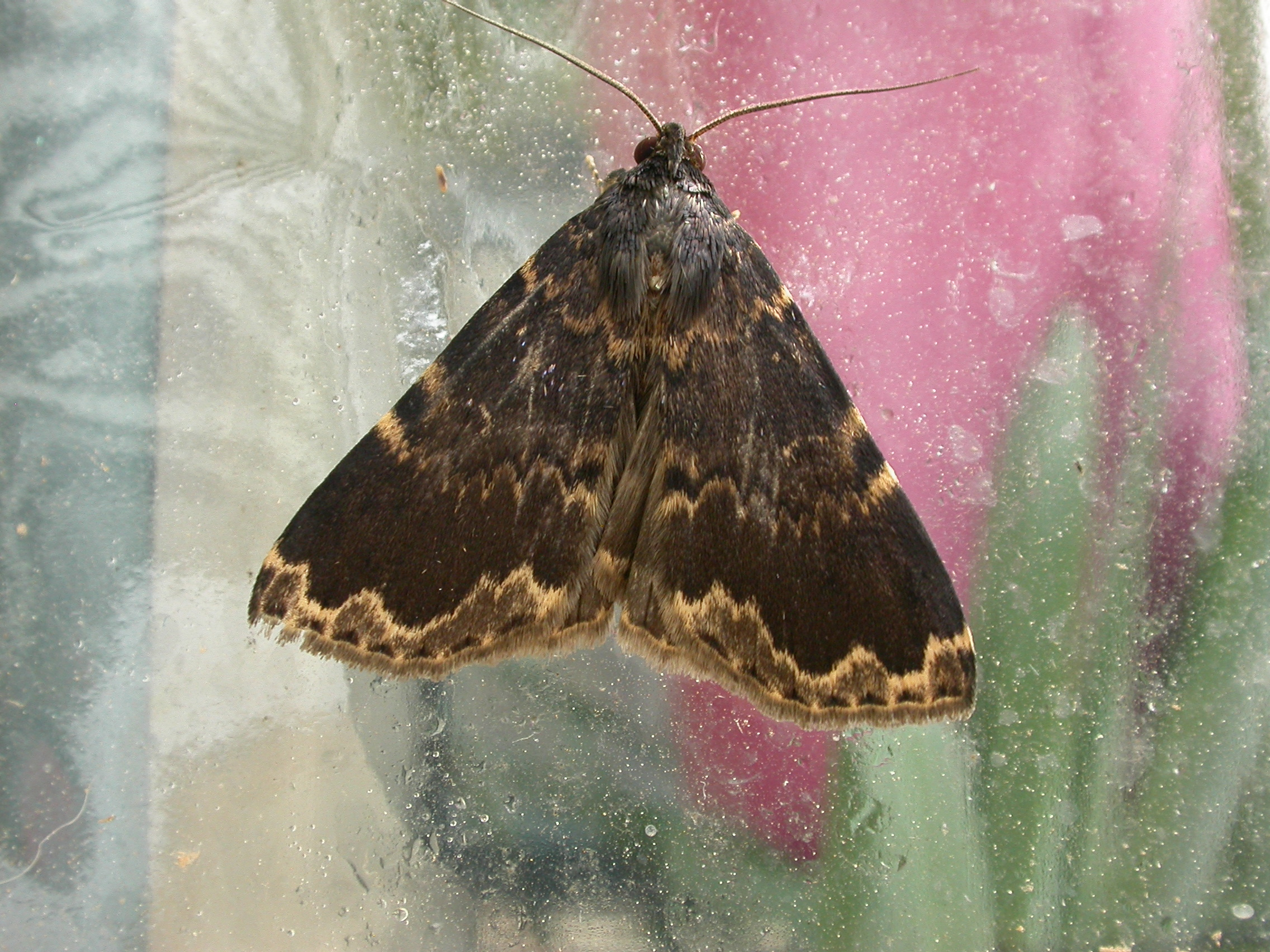

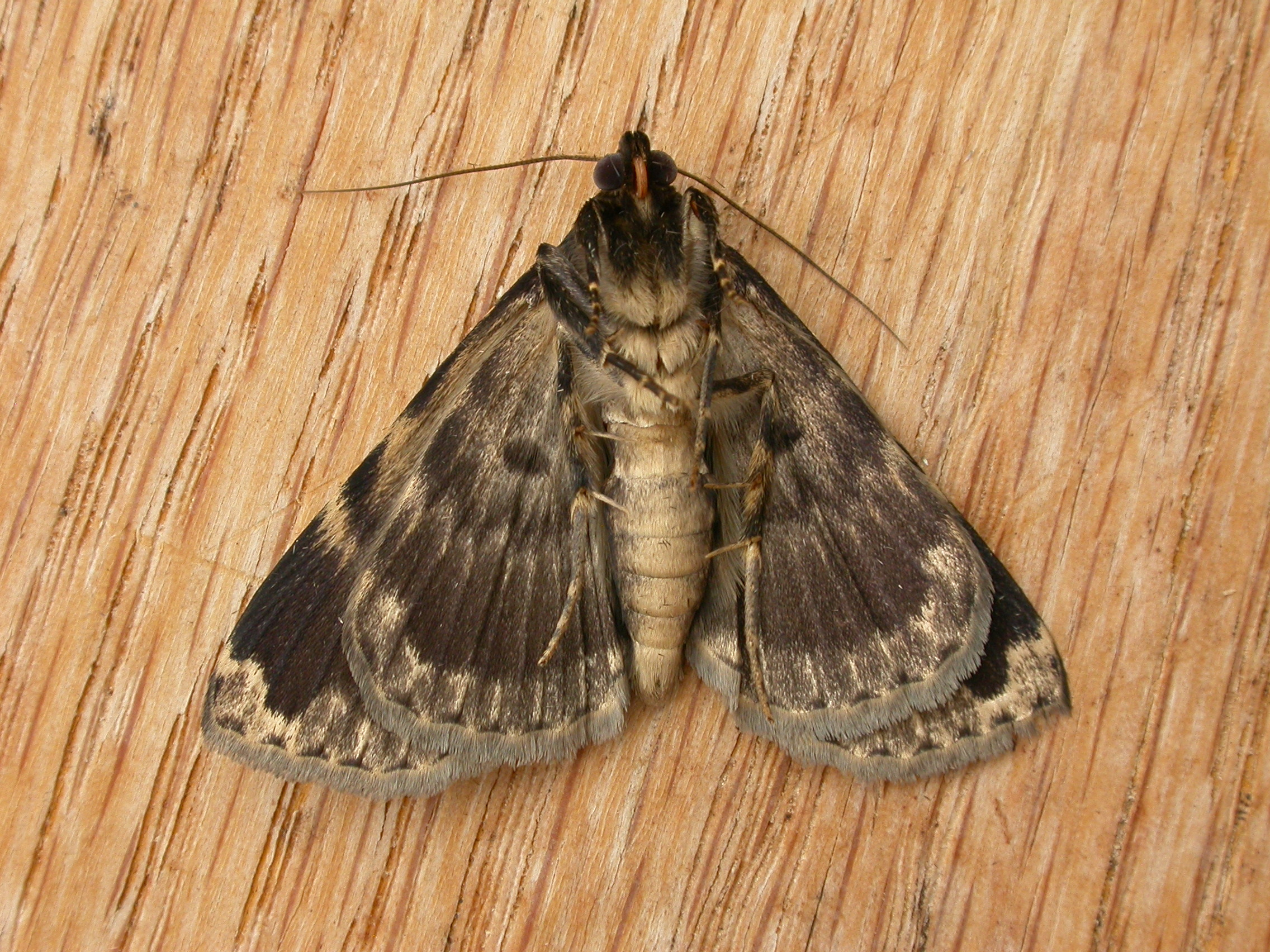

Scientific classification
- Kingdom: Animalia
- Phylum: Arthropoda
- Clade: Pancrustacea
- Class: Insecta
- Order: Lepidoptera
- Superfamily: Noctuoidea
- Family: Erebidae
- Genus: Mormoscopa
- Species: M. sordescens

Binomial name
- Mormoscopa sordescens (Rosenstock, 1885)

Synonyms
- Bleptina sordescens Rosenstock, 1885; Bleptina crossodora Lower, 1895; Mormoscopa crossodora Meyrick, 1897

= Mormoscopa sordescens =

Species of moth

Mormoscopa sordescens is a moth of the family Noctuidae first described by Rudolph Rosenstock in 1885. It is known from Australia, including Queensland and New South Wales.

The wingspan is about 40 millimetres (1.6 in).
