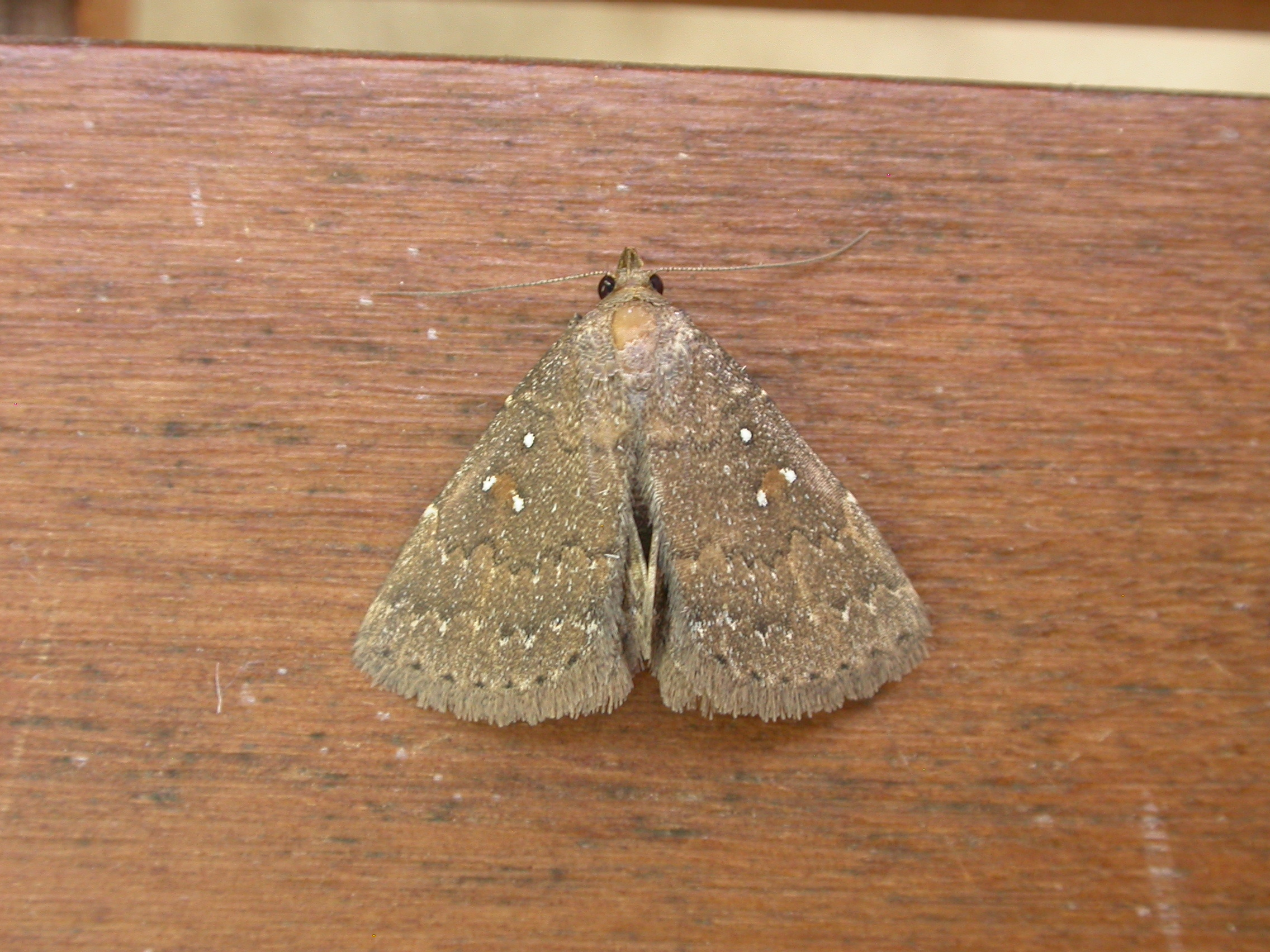

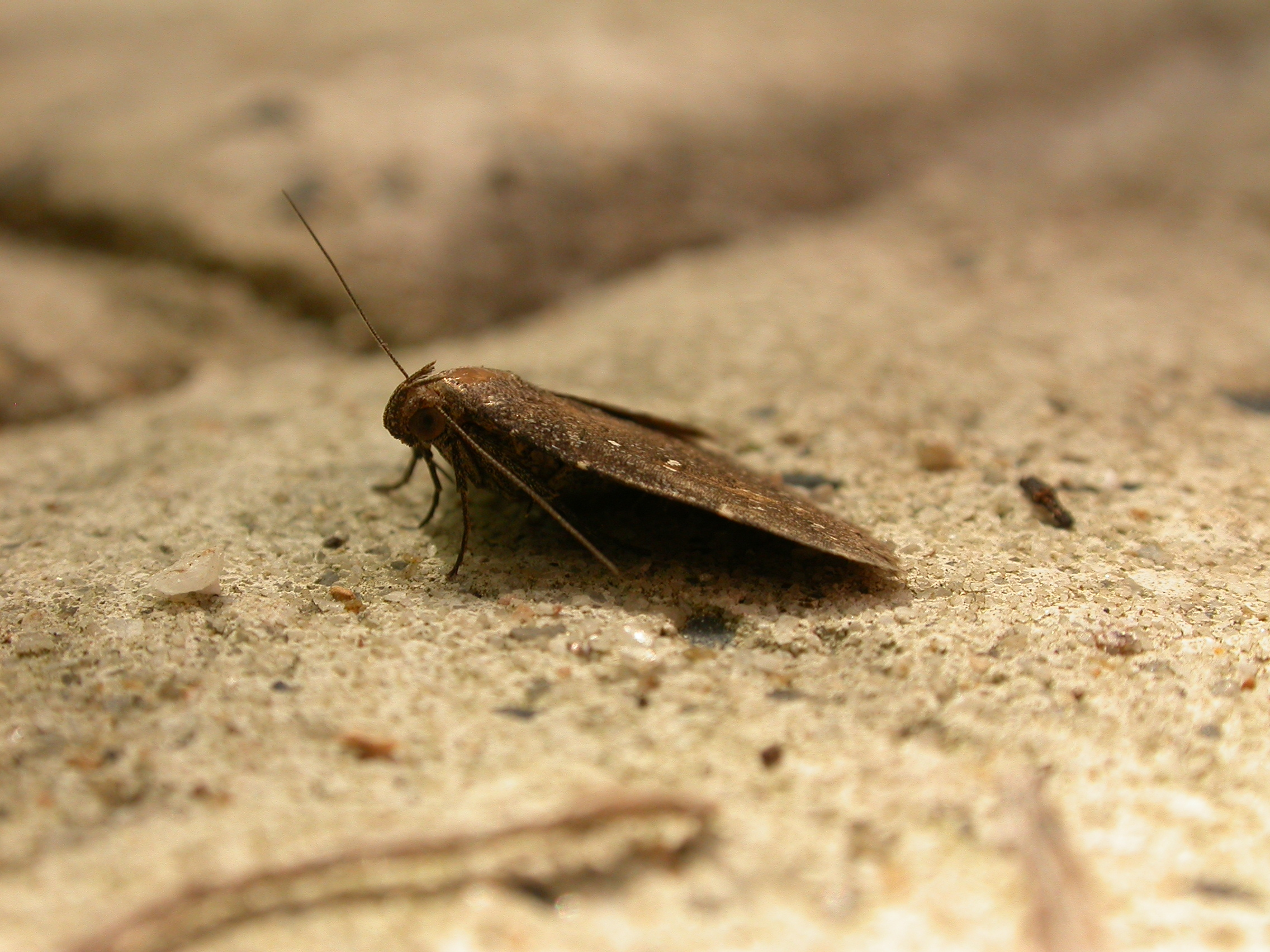

Scientific classification
- Domain: Eukaryota
- Kingdom: Animalia
- Phylum: Arthropoda
- Class: Insecta
- Order: Lepidoptera
- Superfamily: Noctuoidea
- Family: Erebidae
- Genus: Auchmophanes
- Species: A. platysara

Binomial name
- Auchmophanes platysara (Turner, 1929)

Synonyms
- Saroptila platysara Turner, 1929

= Auchmophanes platysara =

Species of moth

Auchmophanes platysara is a species of moth of the family Erebidae first described by Turner in 1929. It is found in the Australian state of Queensland.
