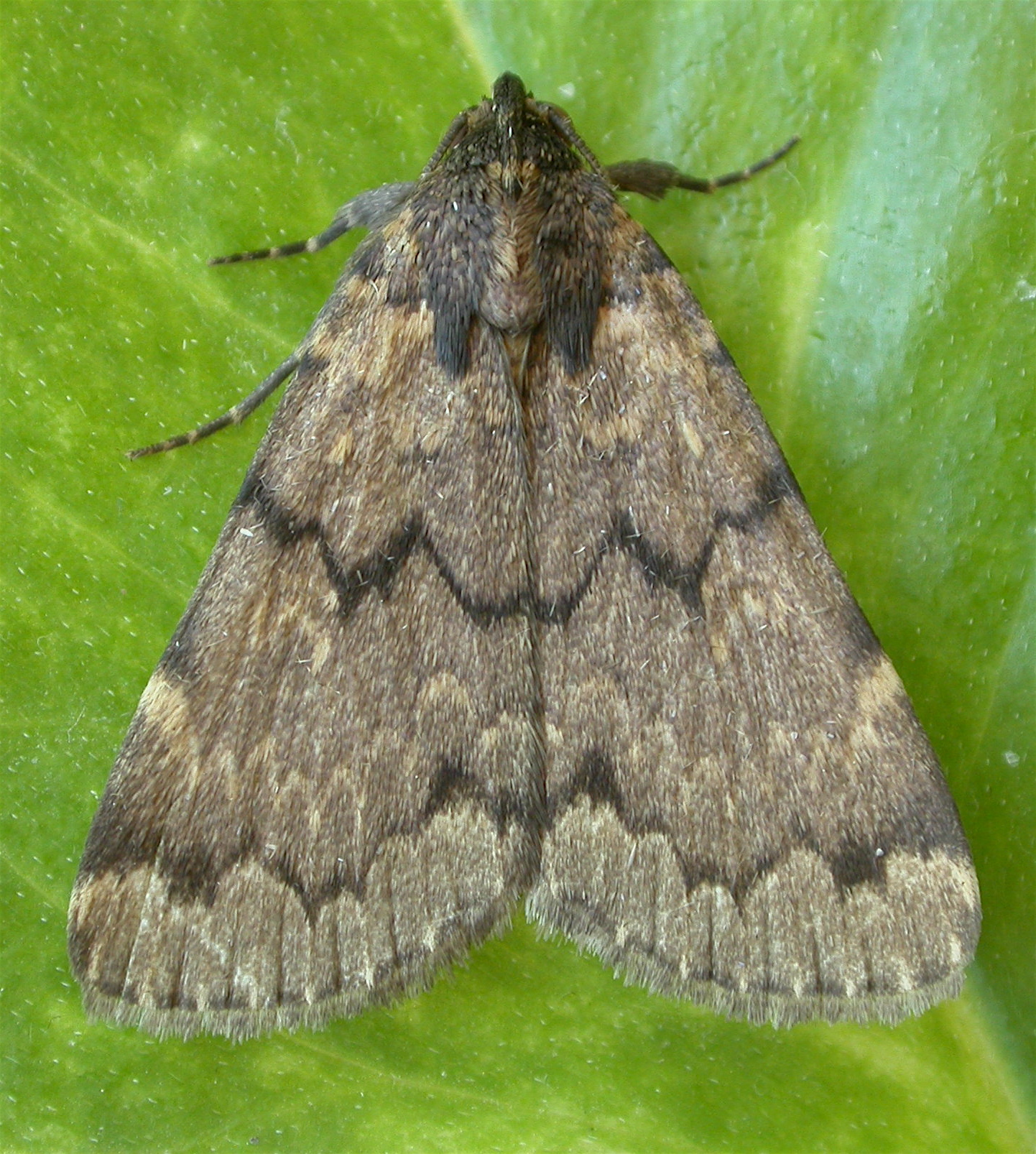

Scientific classification
- Domain: Eukaryota
- Kingdom: Animalia
- Phylum: Arthropoda
- Class: Insecta
- Order: Lepidoptera
- Superfamily: Noctuoidea
- Family: Erebidae
- Genus: Mormoscopa
- Species: M. phricozona

Binomial name
- Mormoscopa phricozona (Turner, 1902)

Synonyms
- Simplicia phricozona Turner, 1902; Bertula nyctiphanta Turner, 1936

= Mormoscopa phricozona =

Species of moth

Mormoscopa phricozona is a moth of the family Noctuidae. It is found in Australia. It was described by Alfred Jefferis Turner in 1902.

The wingspan is about 40 millimetres (1.6 in) Their wings are typically grey to brown with black scallop details.
