= Simplicia inflexalis =

Scientific classification
- Kingdom: Animalia
- Phylum: Arthropoda
- Class: Insecta
- Order: Lepidoptera
- Superfamily: Noctuoidea
- Family: Erebidae
- Genus: Simplicia
- Species: S. inflexalis

Binomial name
- Simplicia inflexalis Guenée, 1854

Species of moth

Simplicia inflexalis is a litter moth of the family Erebidae. It is found in most countries of subtropical Africa, and is known from Congo, Kenya, South Africa, La Réunion, Madagascar and Mauritius.
