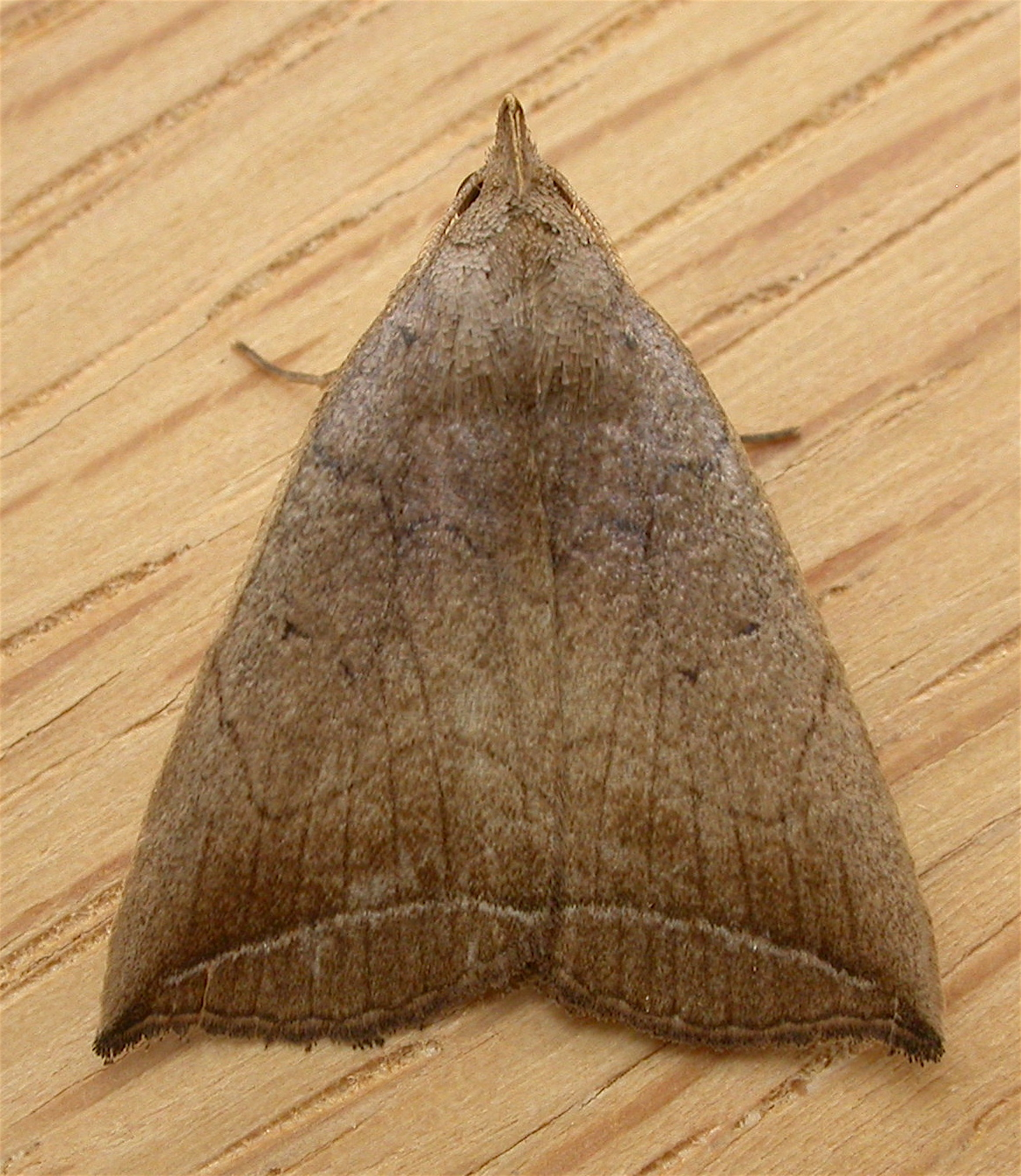

Scientific classification
- Kingdom: Animalia
- Phylum: Arthropoda
- Class: Insecta
- Order: Lepidoptera
- Superfamily: Noctuoidea
- Family: Erebidae
- Genus: Simplicia
- Species: S. armatalis

Binomial name
- Simplicia armatalis Walker, 1866

Synonyms
- Herminia delicata

= Simplicia armatalis =

Species of moth

Simplicia armatalis is a litter moth of the family Erebidae. It is found in Australia.

The wingspan is about 30 mm.
