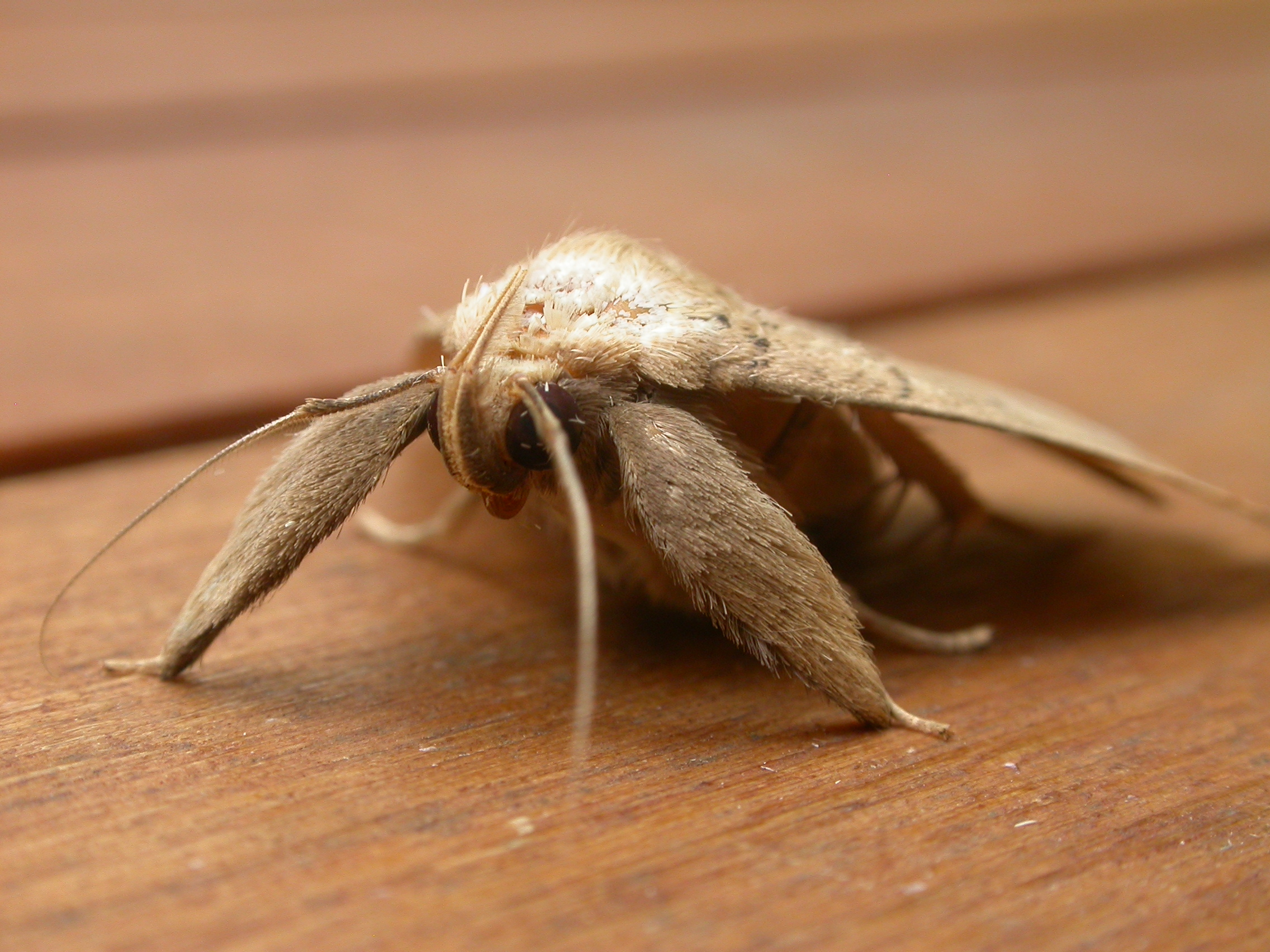

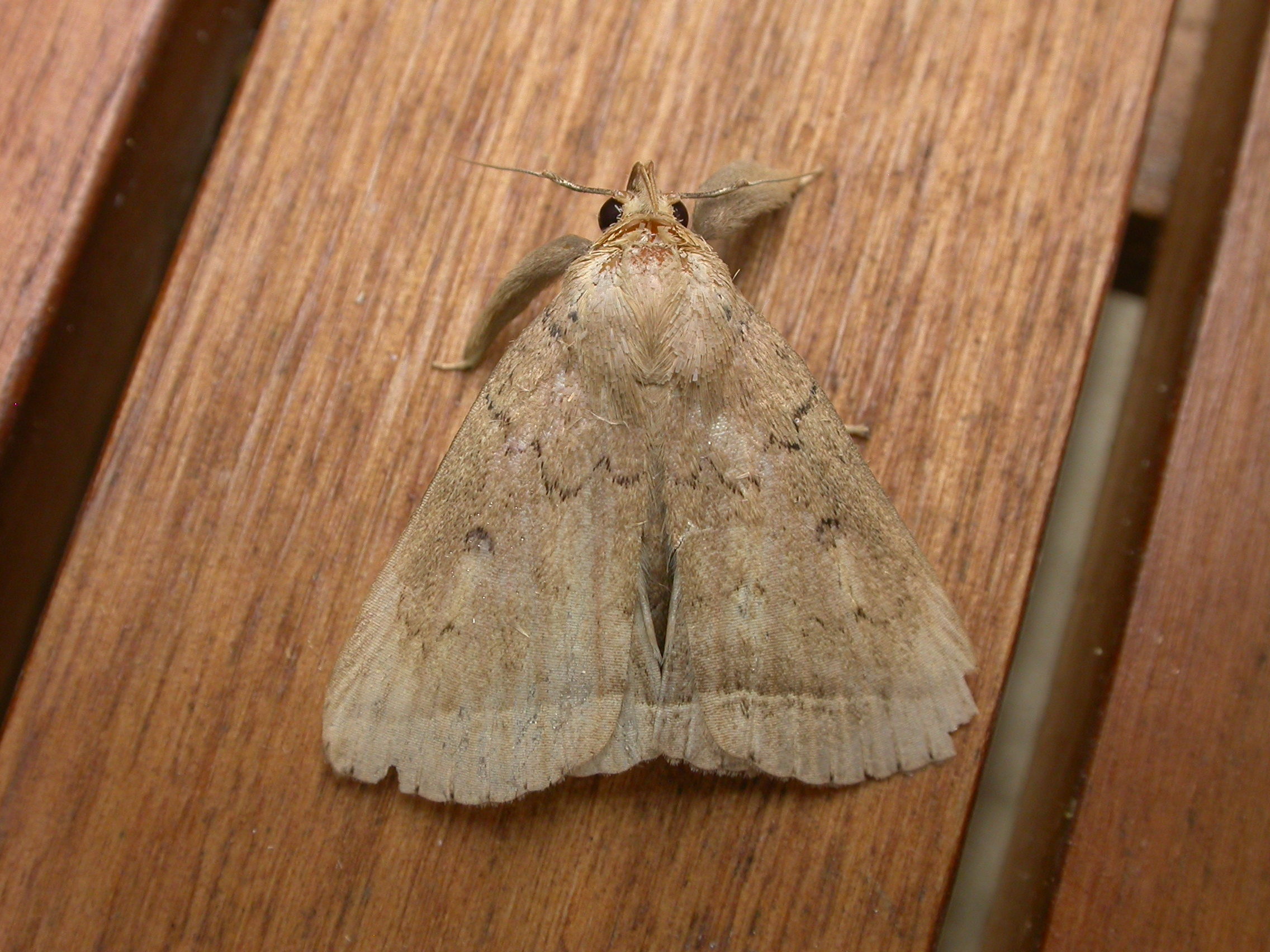

Scientific classification
- Domain: Eukaryota
- Kingdom: Animalia
- Phylum: Arthropoda
- Class: Insecta
- Order: Lepidoptera
- Superfamily: Noctuoidea
- Family: Erebidae
- Genus: Simplicia
- Species: S. erebina

Binomial name
- Simplicia erebina (Butler, 1887)

Synonyms
- Aginna erebina Butler, 1887; Herminia dormiens Lucas, 1900; Libisosa floccosa Bethune-Baker, 1908

= Simplicia erebina =

Species of moth

Simplicia erebina is a species of litter moth of the family Erebidae. It is found in Papua New Guinea and Australia (including Queensland).
