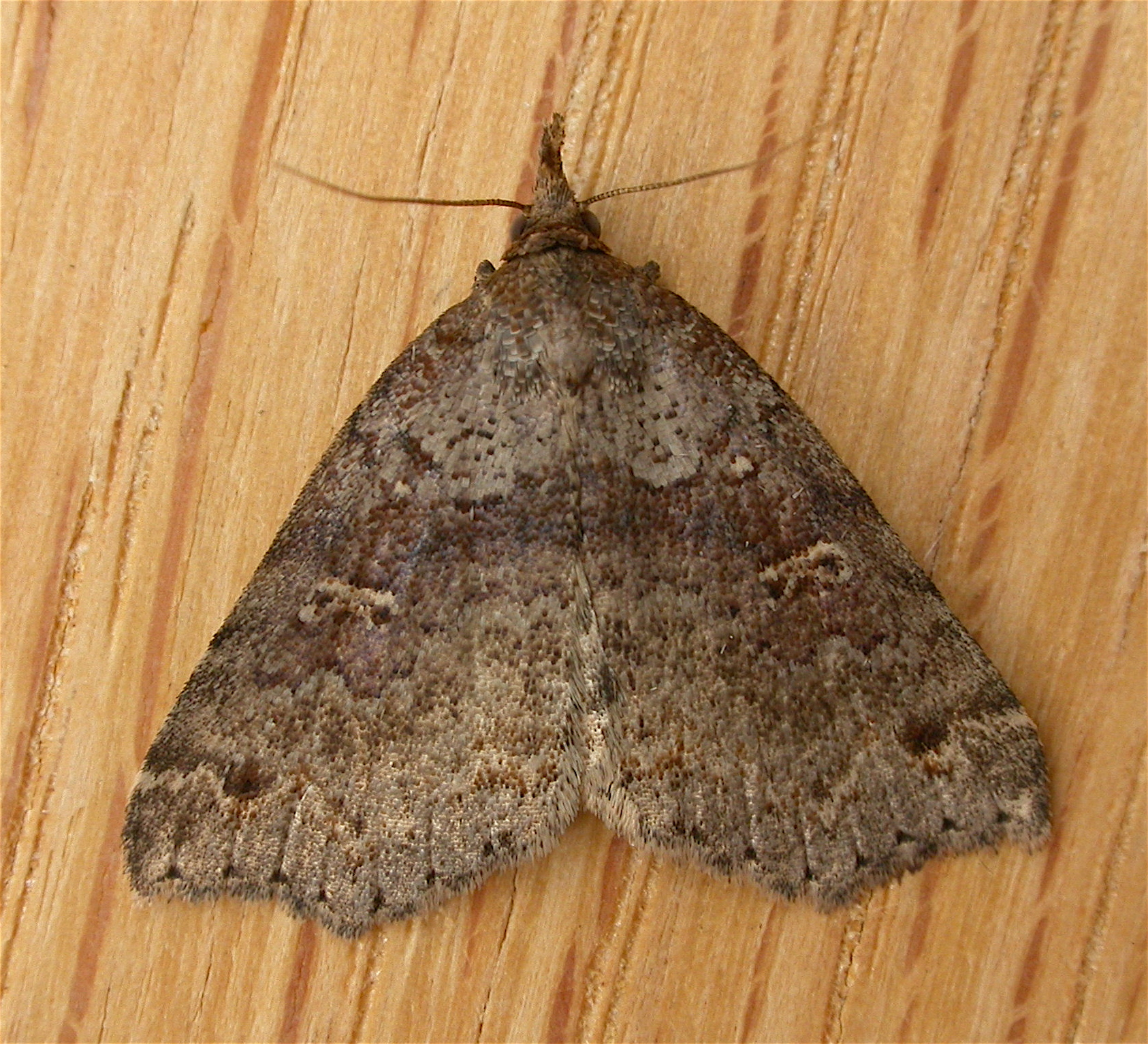

Scientific classification
- Domain: Eukaryota
- Kingdom: Animalia
- Phylum: Arthropoda
- Class: Insecta
- Order: Lepidoptera
- Superfamily: Noctuoidea
- Family: Erebidae
- Genus: Lithilaria
- Species: L. ossicolor

Binomial name
- Lithilaria ossicolor Rosenstock, 1885

= Lithilaria ossicolor =

Species of moth

Lithilaria ossicolor, the bone moth, is a moth of the family Erebidae first described by Rudolph Rosenstock in 1885. It is found in Australia.

The wingspan is about 30 mm.
