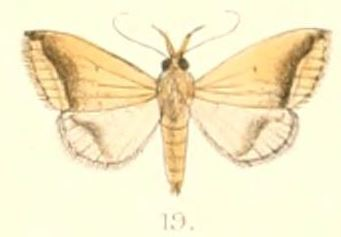

Scientific classification
- Kingdom: Animalia
- Phylum: Arthropoda
- Class: Insecta
- Order: Lepidoptera
- Superfamily: Noctuoidea
- Family: Erebidae
- Genus: Simplicia
- Species: S. mistacalis

Binomial name
- Simplicia mistacalis (Guenée, 1854)

Synonyms
- Herminia mistacalis Guenée, 1854; Bocana marginata Moore, 1882

= Simplicia mistacalis =

Species of moth

Simplicia mistacalis is a litter moth of the family Erebidae. It was first described by Achille Guenée in 1854 and is found in Asia, from India and Sri Lanka to Taiwan and New Guinea, including China, Myanmar, Japan, the Philippines and Malaysia.

== Description ==
Its wingspan is about 24–26 mm. The forewings are much broader. The outer margin less oblique. Raised tufts are slight. Body pale ochreous brown. Forewings with indistinct oblique antemedial line and indistinct postmedial line. There is a prominent oblique white line which runs from the apex to the inner margin beyond the middle, with a diffused dark inner edge.
