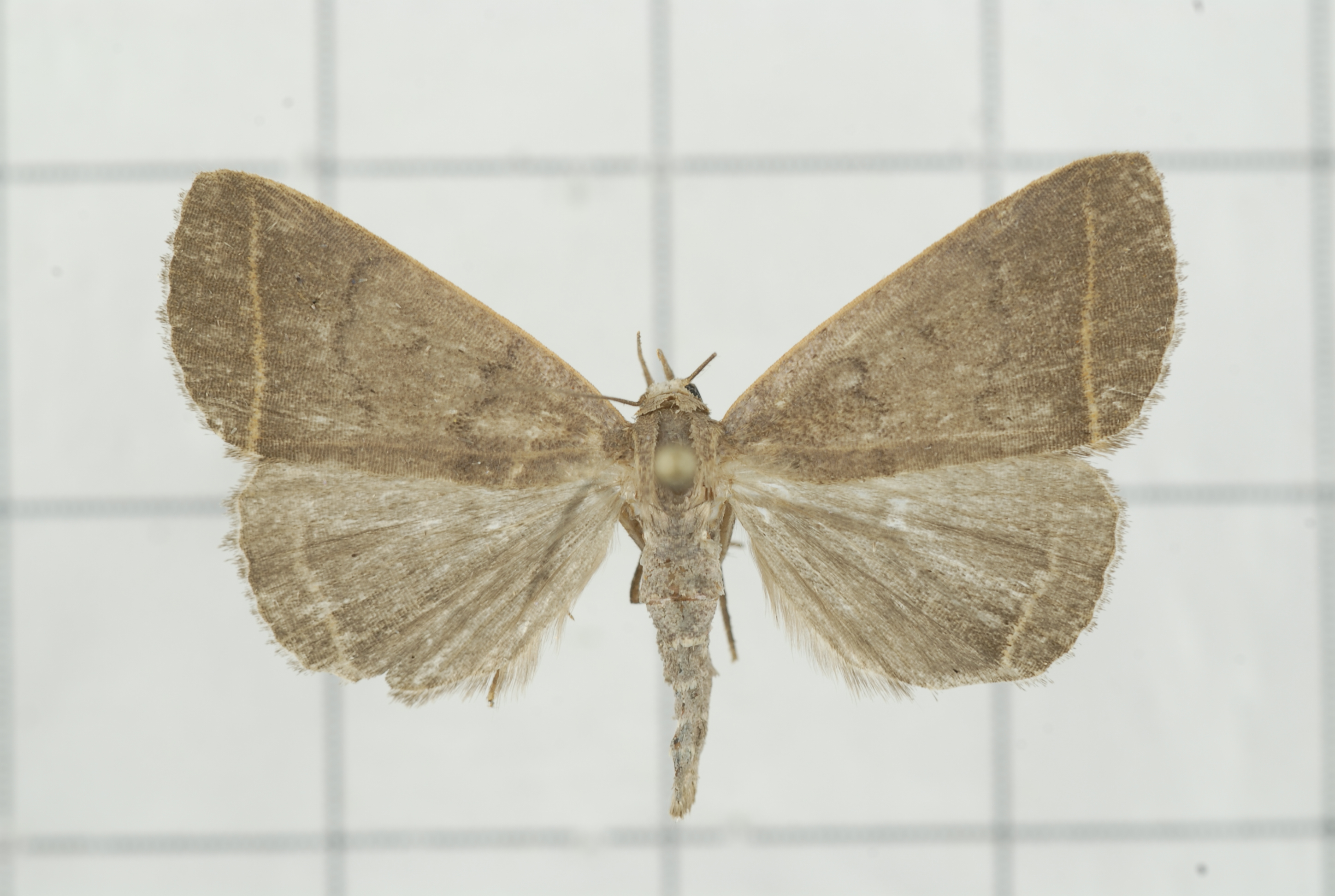

Scientific classification
- Domain: Eukaryota
- Kingdom: Animalia
- Phylum: Arthropoda
- Class: Insecta
- Order: Lepidoptera
- Superfamily: Noctuoidea
- Family: Erebidae
- Genus: Simplicia
- Species: S. cornicalis

Binomial name
- Simplicia cornicalis (Fabricius, 1794)

Synonyms
- Phalaena cornicalis Fabricius, 1794; Nodaria cornicalis (Fabricius, 1794); Herminia cinerealis Walker, 1866; Simplicia caeneusalis (Walker, [1859]); Sophronia caeneusalis Walker, 1859; Bocana robustalis Walker, 1866; Aginna simulata Moore, 1882; Libisosa obiana Swinhoe, 1919; Simplicia lautokiensis A. E. Prout, 1933; Simplicia ryukyuensis Sugi, 1965; Simplicia buffetti Holloway, 1977

= Simplicia cornicalis =

Species of moth

Simplicia cornicalis is a litter moth of the family Erebidae. The species was first described by Johan Christian Fabricius in 1794. It is found in south-eastern Asia and the Pacific. Records include New Caledonia, Réunion, Thailand, Fiji, Hawaii, India, Sri Lanka, the Society Islands, as well as New South Wales and Queensland in Australia. It is an introduced species in southern Florida and Louisiana in the United States.

== Taxonomy ==
Simplicia caeneusalis was placed in synonymy with Simplicia cornicalis by Jeremy Daniel Holloway in 2008 after examination of the genitalia of the type in Copenhagen.

== Description ==
The wingspan is 20–38 mm. Antennae of male knotted and contorted and with a slight tuft of scales at middle. The fore femur with a tuft of long hair. The sheath on fore tibia very long. Body more ochreous brown. Forewings with curved crenulate postmedial line. Hardly a trace of dark suffusion found inside the submarginal line, the area beyond it ochreous brown. Hindwings with dark suffusion, but lack grey color as in other species.

The larvae feed on dead leaves, and can be a pest for roofs constructed of dried palm leaves.
