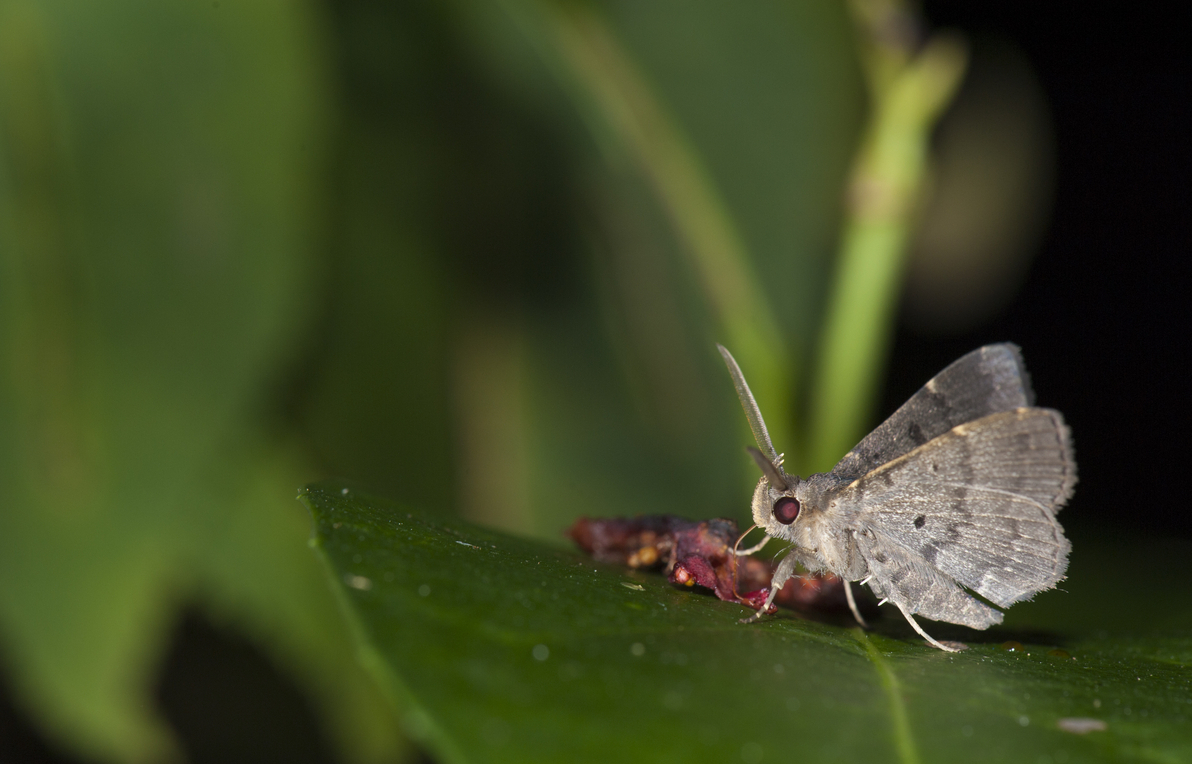

Scientific classification
- Kingdom: Animalia
- Phylum: Arthropoda
- Clade: Pancrustacea
- Class: Insecta
- Order: Lepidoptera
- Superfamily: Noctuoidea
- Family: Erebidae
- Genus: Bocana
- Species: B. manifestalis

Binomial name
- Bocana manifestalis Walker, 1858

Synonyms
- Diomea repulsa Walker, 1865; Bithiasa determinata Walker, 1865; Lamura oberratalis Walker, 1858; Adrapsa manifestalis; Adrapsa scotosa Holland, 1900; Herminia iridescens T. P. Lucas, 1900; Pseudaglossa pygata Strand, 1920

= Bocana manifestalis =

Species of moth

Bocana manifestalis is a moth of the family Erebidae. It was first described by Francis Walker in 1858. It is widespread from India through the Pacific.

== Description ==
Its wingspan is about 36–40 mm. Males with third joint of palpi upturned and naked. No tuft from second joint. Antennae pectinated. Forewings with a large costal fold. Male with bipectinate antennae with moderate length branches. Body dark fuscous brown. Forewings with indistinct oblique antemedial dark line. A white or black speck found at end of cell. There is a waved postmedial line excurved beyond cell. An irregularly sinuous submarginal line present. Hindwings with medial and submarginal waved lines. Ventral side with black cell-spot. Many specimens have two waved line with whitish outer edges.

Larvae have been recorded on various grasses and weeds.
