= Corethrobela =

Scientific classification
- Domain: Eukaryota
- Kingdom: Animalia
- Phylum: Arthropoda
- Class: Insecta
- Order: Lepidoptera
- Superfamily: Noctuoidea
- Family: Erebidae
- Subfamily: Hypeninae
- Genus: Corethrobela; Turner, 1908
- Species: C. melanophaes

Binomial name
- Corethrobela melanophaes Turner, 1908

Genus of moths

Corethrobela is a monotypic moth genus in the family Erebidae. Its only species, Corethrobela melanophaes, is known from the Australian state of Queensland. Both the genus and the species were first described by Turner in 1908.
