= C. inelegans =

C. inelegans may refer to:

- Champsosaurus inelegans, an extinct species of diapsid reptile
- Cleora inelegans, a moth species found in Nigeria
- Culex inelegans, a mosquito species in the genus Culex
- Cymbella inelegans, a fresh water diatom species found in the United States

== See also ==
- C. elegans (disambiguation)
