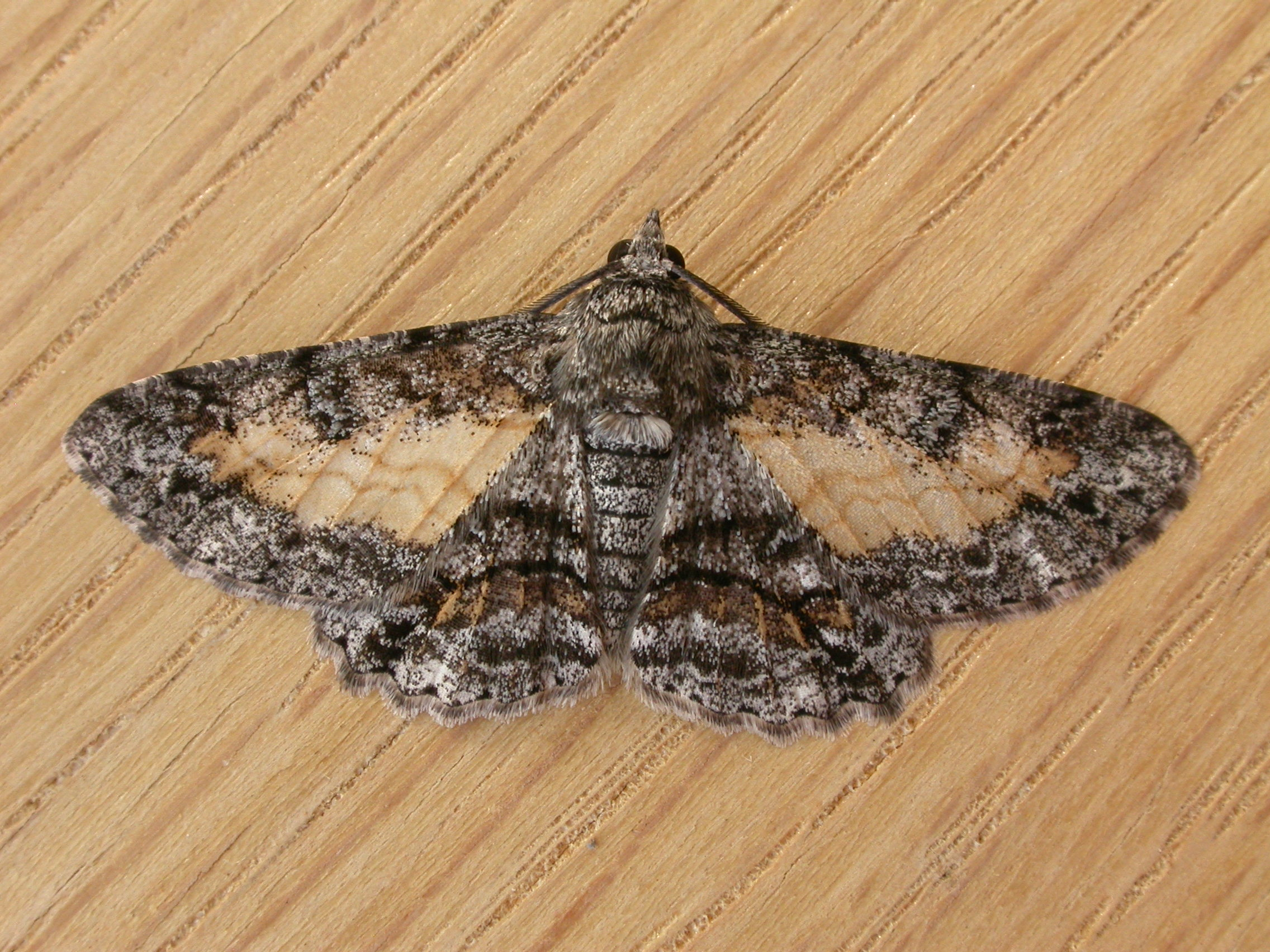

Scientific classification
- Kingdom: Animalia
- Phylum: Arthropoda
- Class: Insecta
- Order: Lepidoptera
- Family: Geometridae
- Genus: Cleora
- Species: C. injectaria

Binomial name
- Cleora injectaria Walker, 1860

Synonyms
- Boarmia injectaria

= Cleora injectaria =

Species of moth

Cleora injectaria is a moth of the family Geometridae described by Francis Walker in 1860. It is found in the tropical regions of the Indomalayan and Australasian realms, up to Fiji and New Caledonia.

== Description ==
The wingspan is about 36–50 mm. Adults are greyish or pale brown with variable complicated darker markings, with about nine color morphs. It is known that there are about nine different color morphs in the C. alienaria complex - with the black and white banded forms, more abundant than grey, brown and white forms, plain forms and black discal spot forms.

The larvae feed on mangrove vegetation of Rhizophora, Avicennia, Excoecaria and Xylocarpus species.

== Color morphs ==
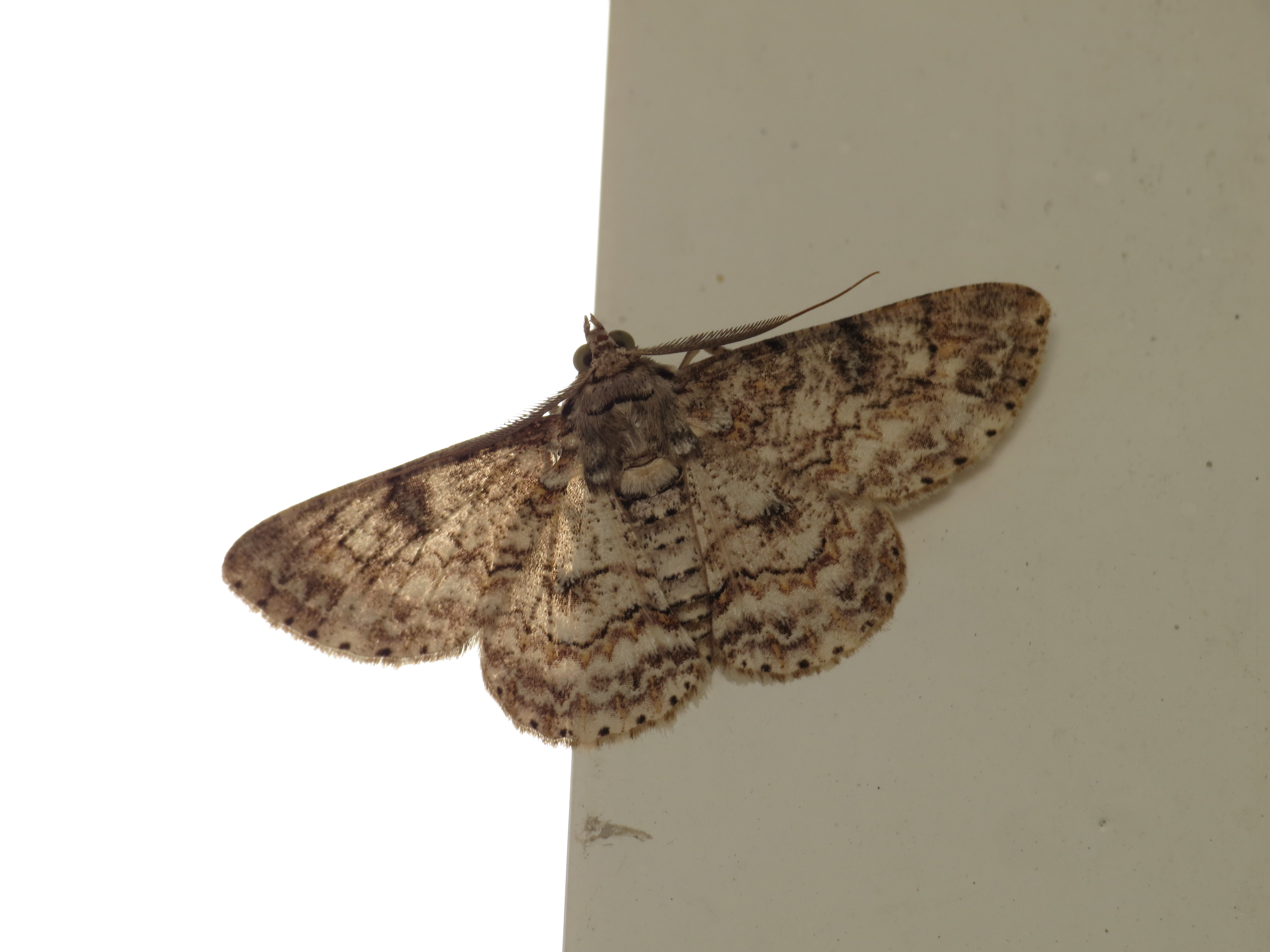

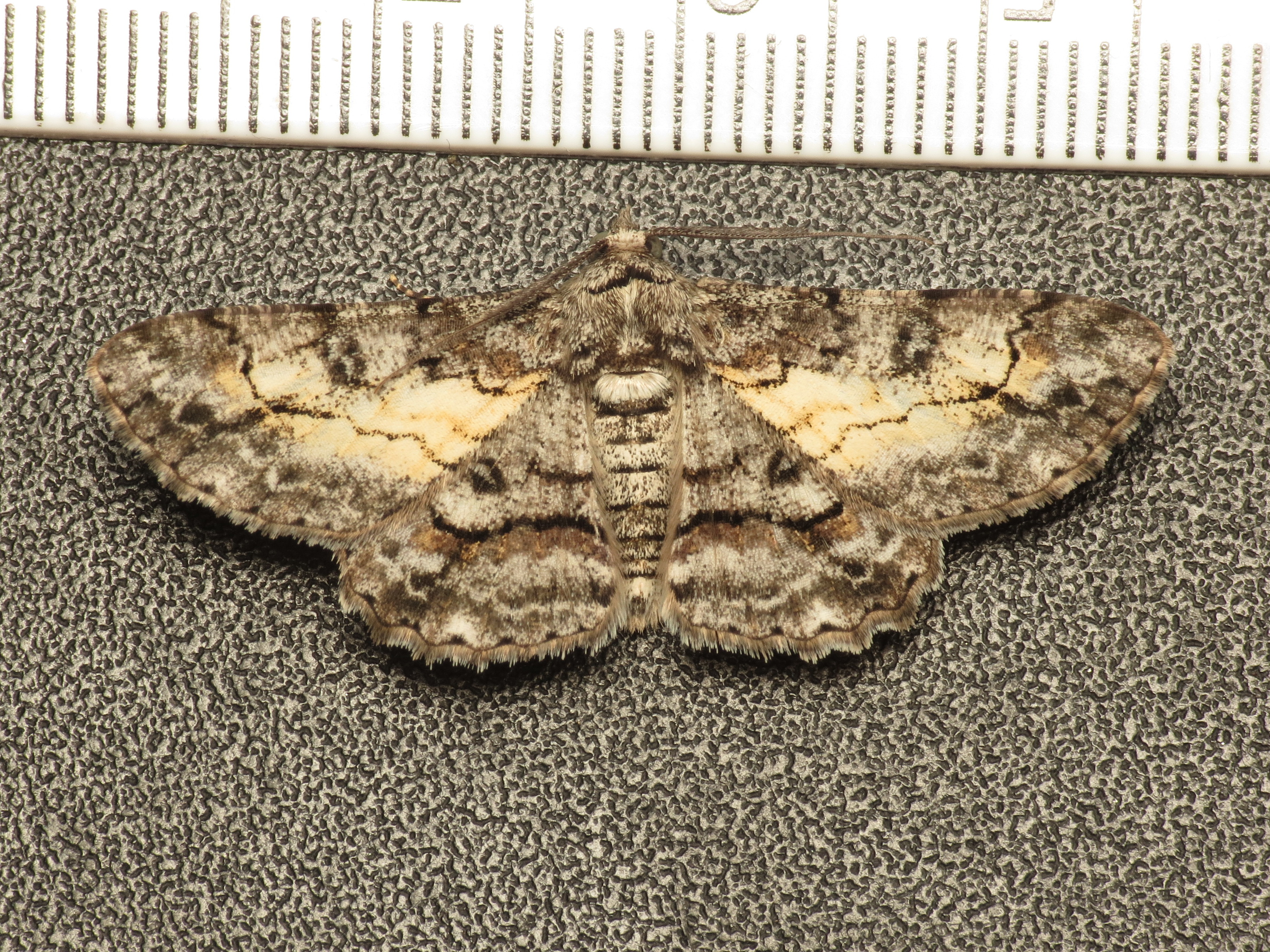

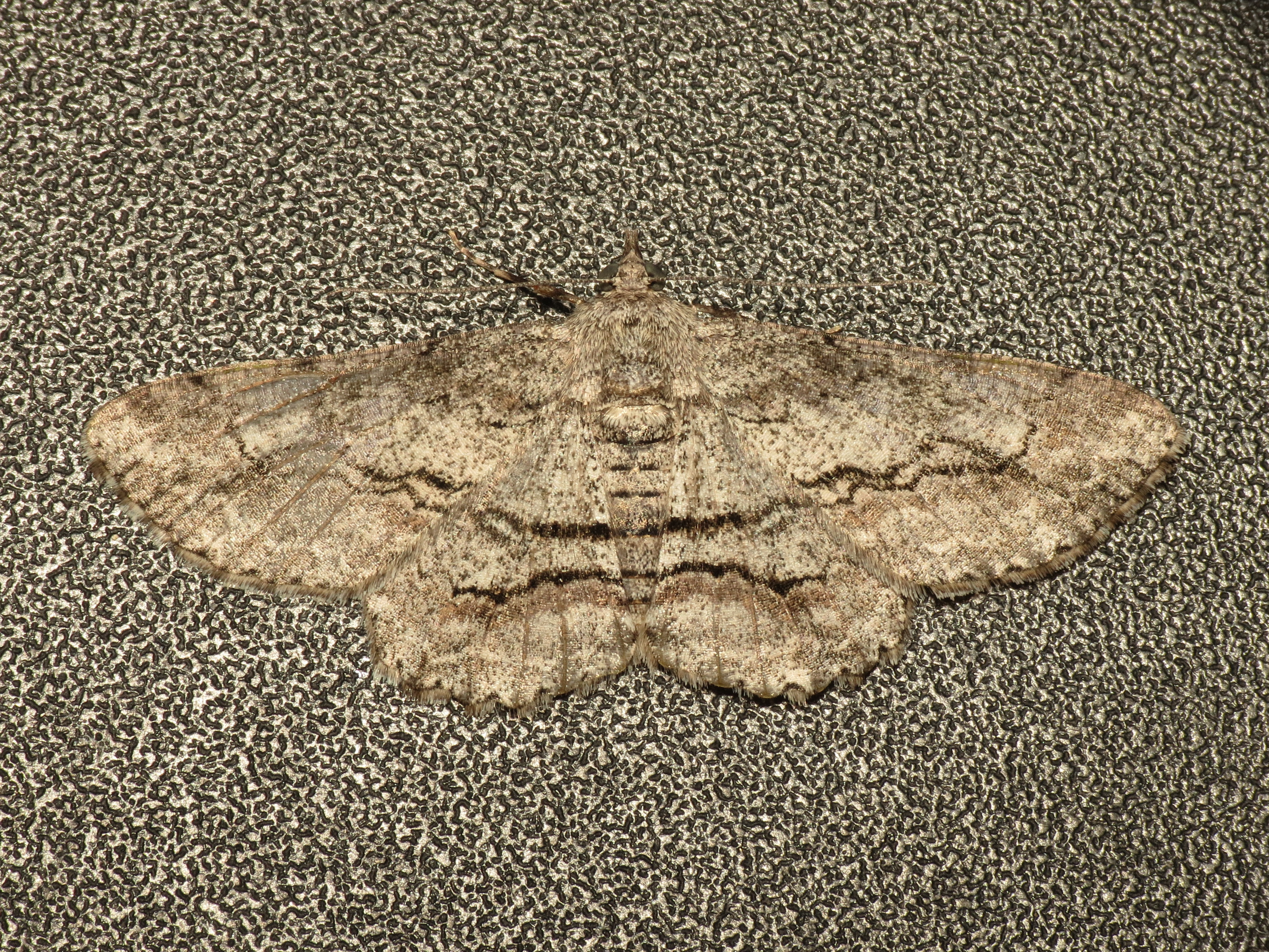

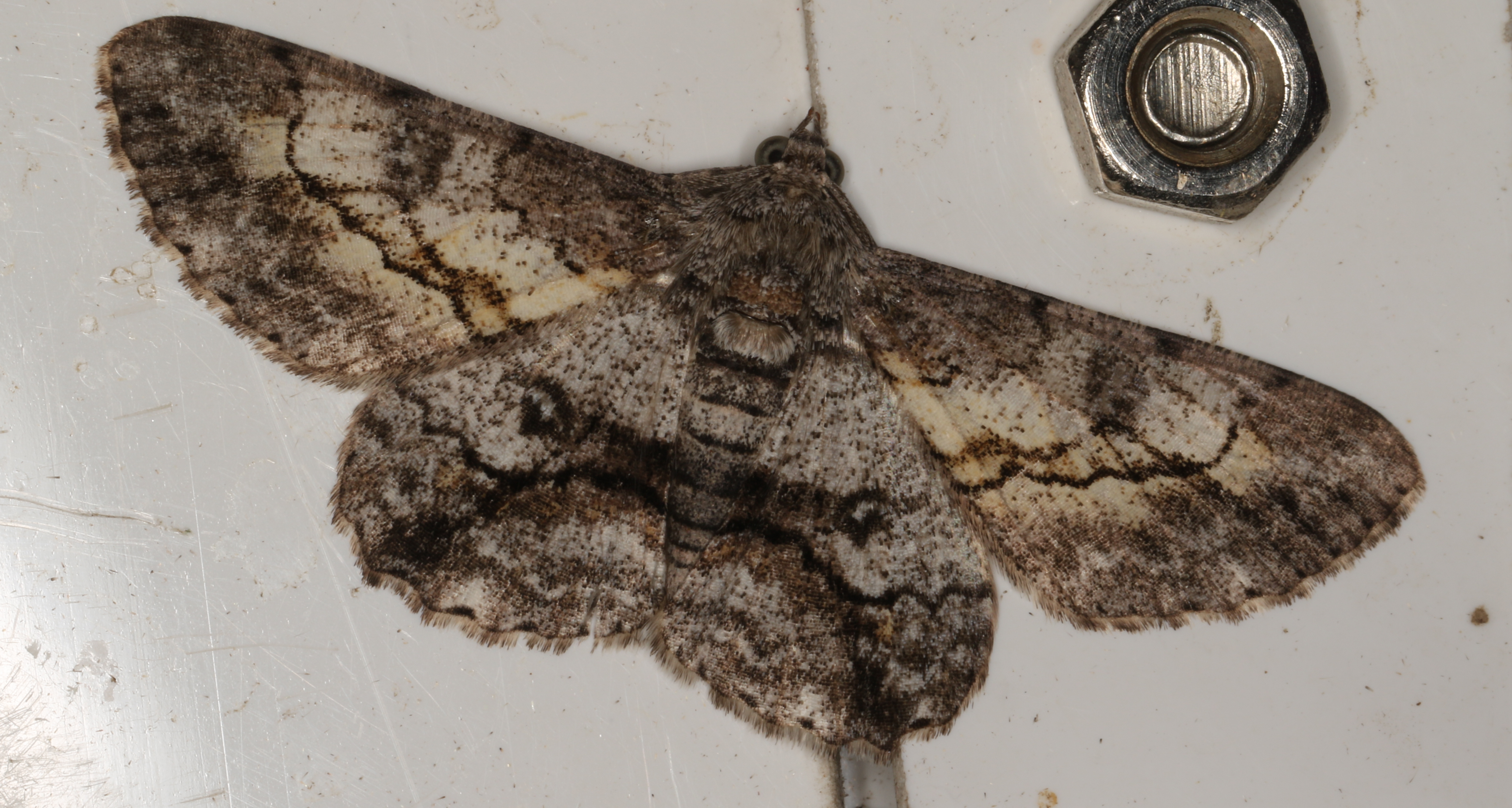

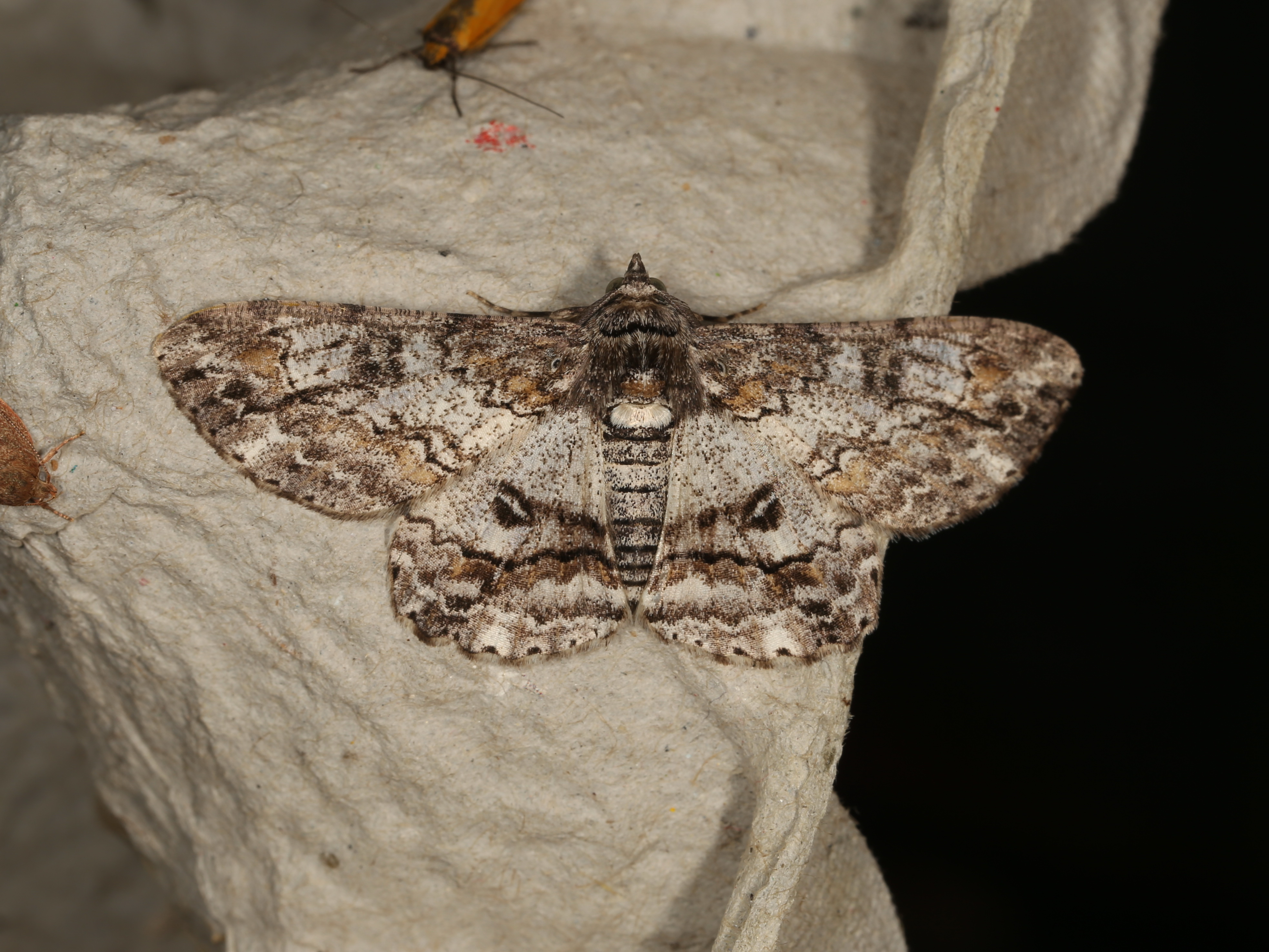

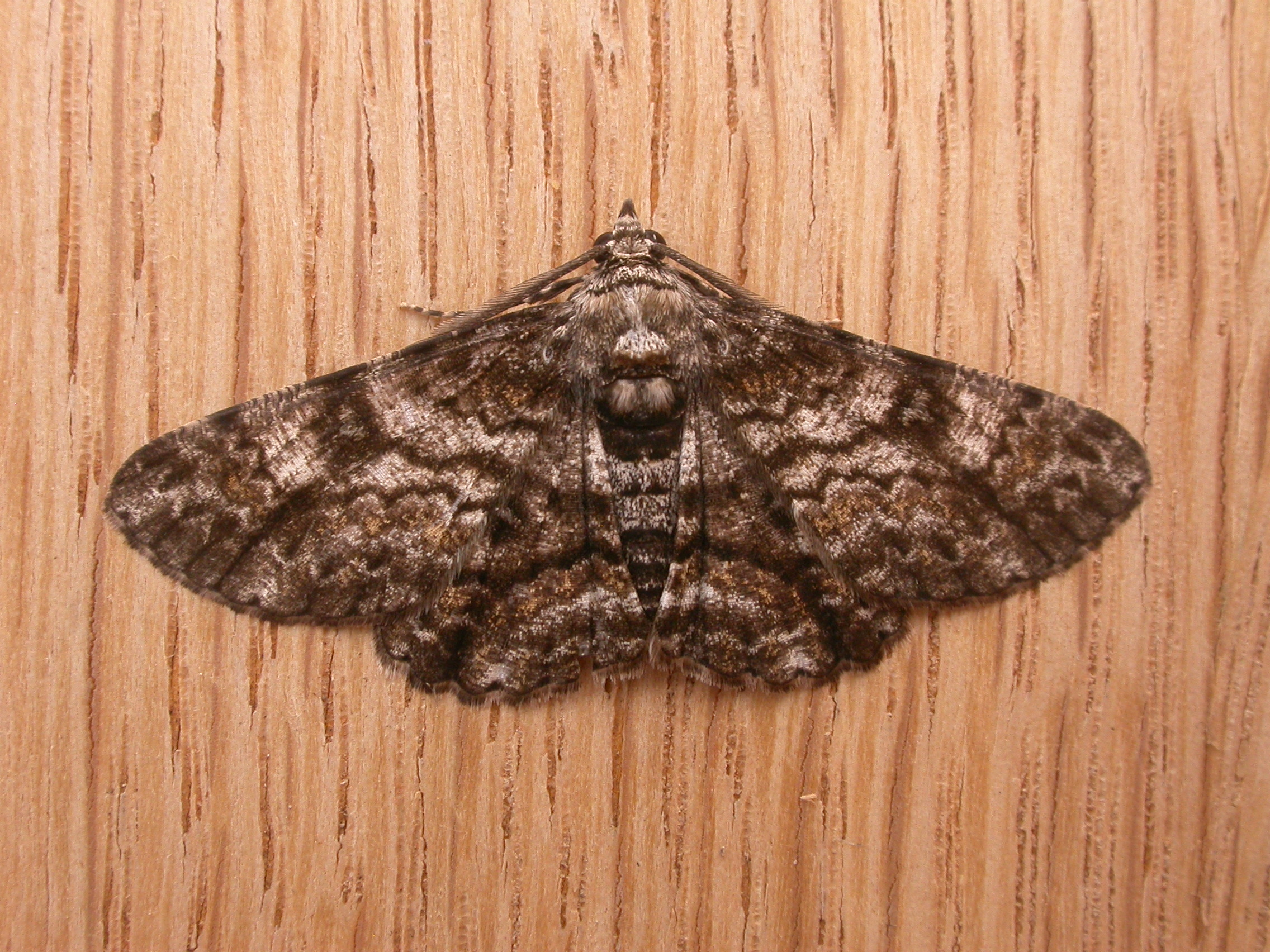

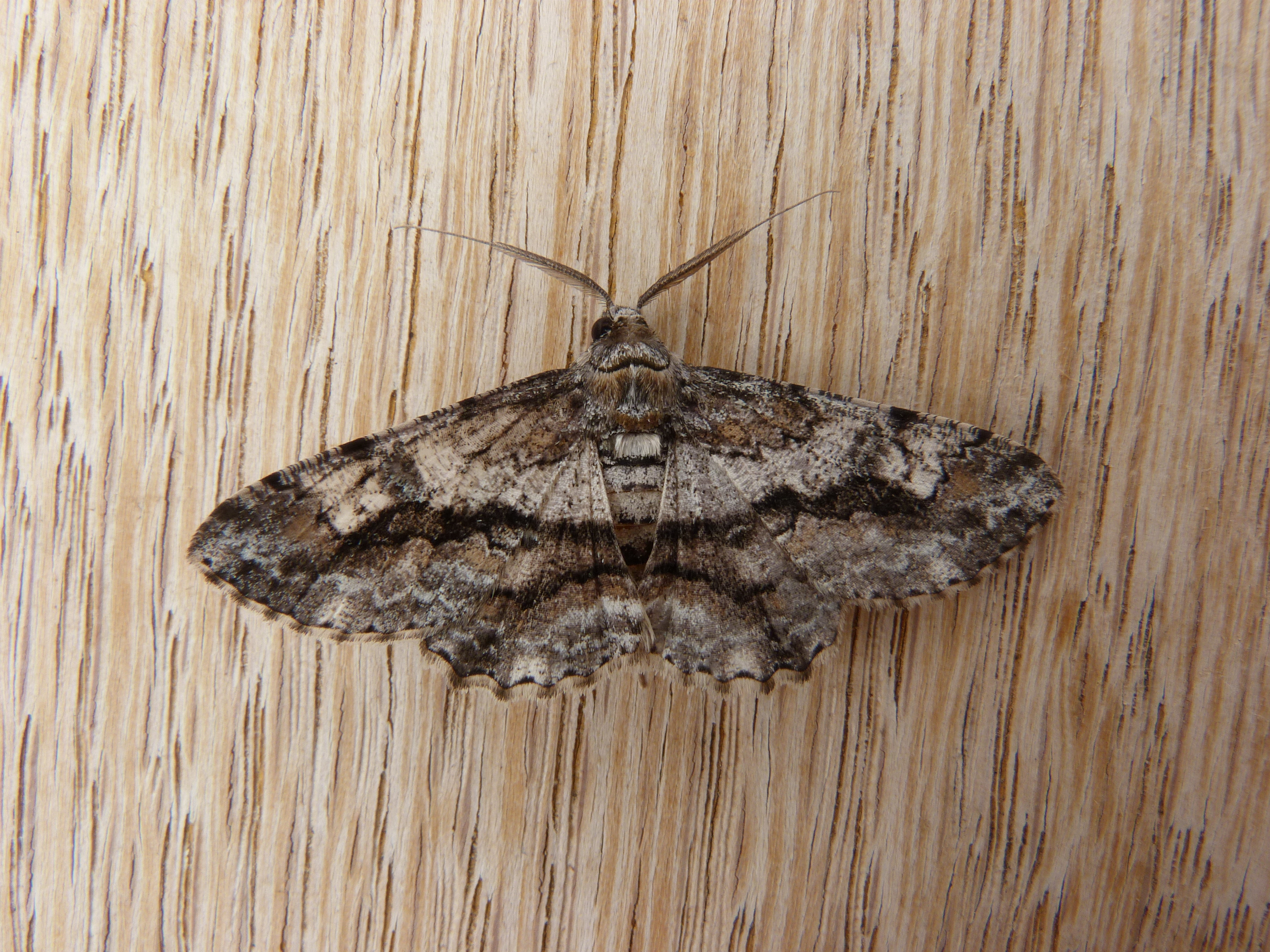

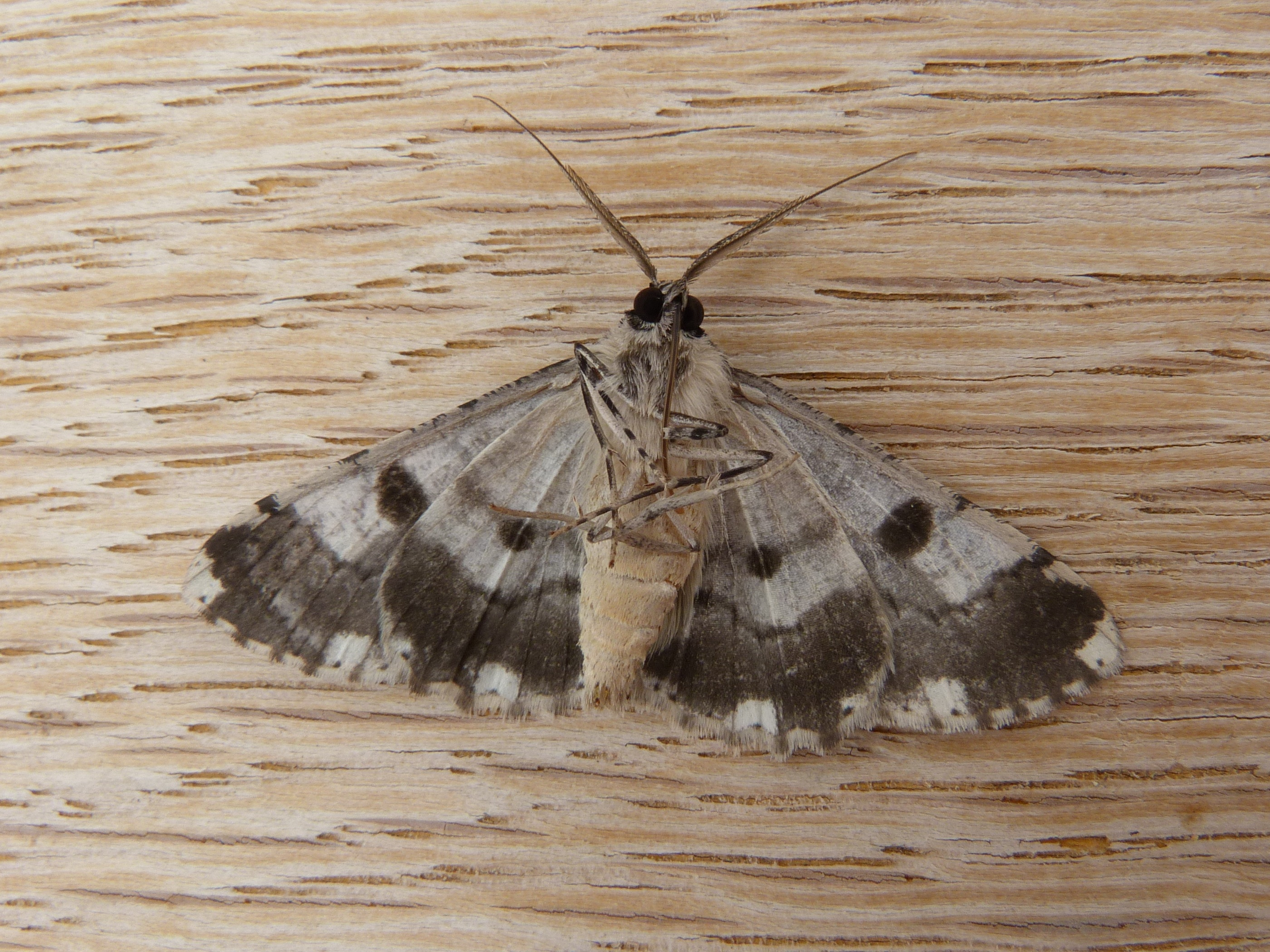
