= Cleora atriclava =

Scientific classification
- Kingdom: Animalia
- Phylum: Arthropoda
- Clade: Pancrustacea
- Class: Insecta
- Order: Lepidoptera
- Family: Geometridae
- Genus: Cleora
- Species: C. atriclava

Binomial name
- Cleora atriclava Prout, 1926

Species of moth

Cleora atriclava is a moth of the family Geometridae. It is known from northern Madagascar.

It has a wingspan between 34–40 mm.
