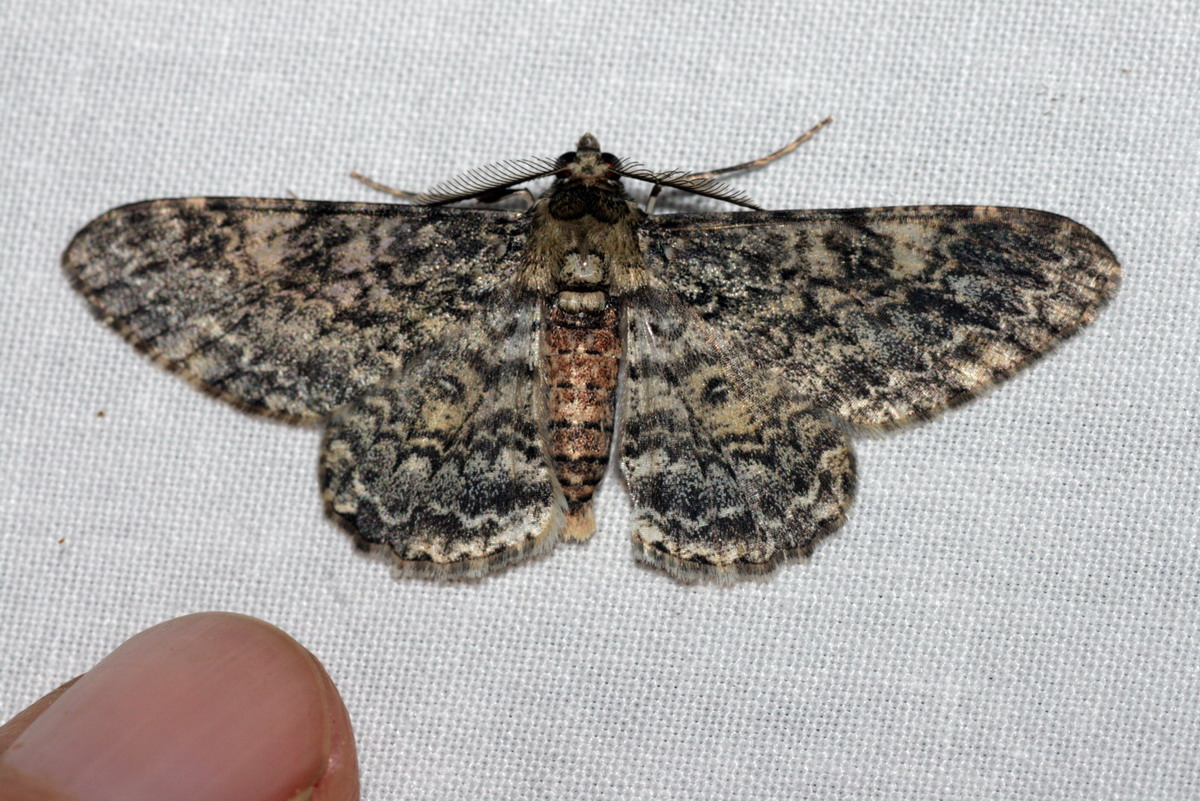

Scientific classification
- Kingdom: Animalia
- Phylum: Arthropoda
- Clade: Pancrustacea
- Class: Insecta
- Order: Lepidoptera
- Family: Geometridae
- Genus: Cleora
- Species: C. inoffensa

Binomial name
- Cleora inoffensa (C. Swinhoe, 1902)

Synonyms
- Boarmia inoffensa C. Swinhoe, 1902; Carecomotis inoffensa D. S. Fletcher, 1953

= Cleora inoffensa =

Species of moth

Cleora inoffensa is a moth of the family Geometridae first described by Charles Swinhoe in 1902. It is found in the Himalayas, Sundaland, the Philippines, Sulawesi and on the Solomons.
