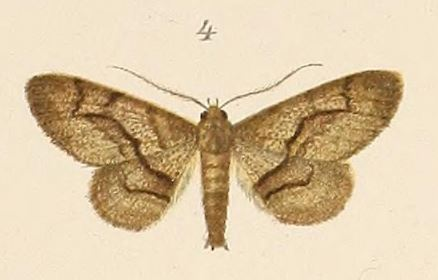

Scientific classification
- Domain: Eukaryota
- Kingdom: Animalia
- Phylum: Arthropoda
- Class: Insecta
- Order: Lepidoptera
- Family: Geometridae
- Genus: Cleora
- Species: C. transversaria

Binomial name
- Cleora transversaria (Pagenstecher, 1907)

Synonyms
- Boarmia transversaria Pagenstecher, 1907

= Cleora transversaria =

Species of moth

Cleora transversaria is a moth of the family Geometridae. It is found in the Comoros.
