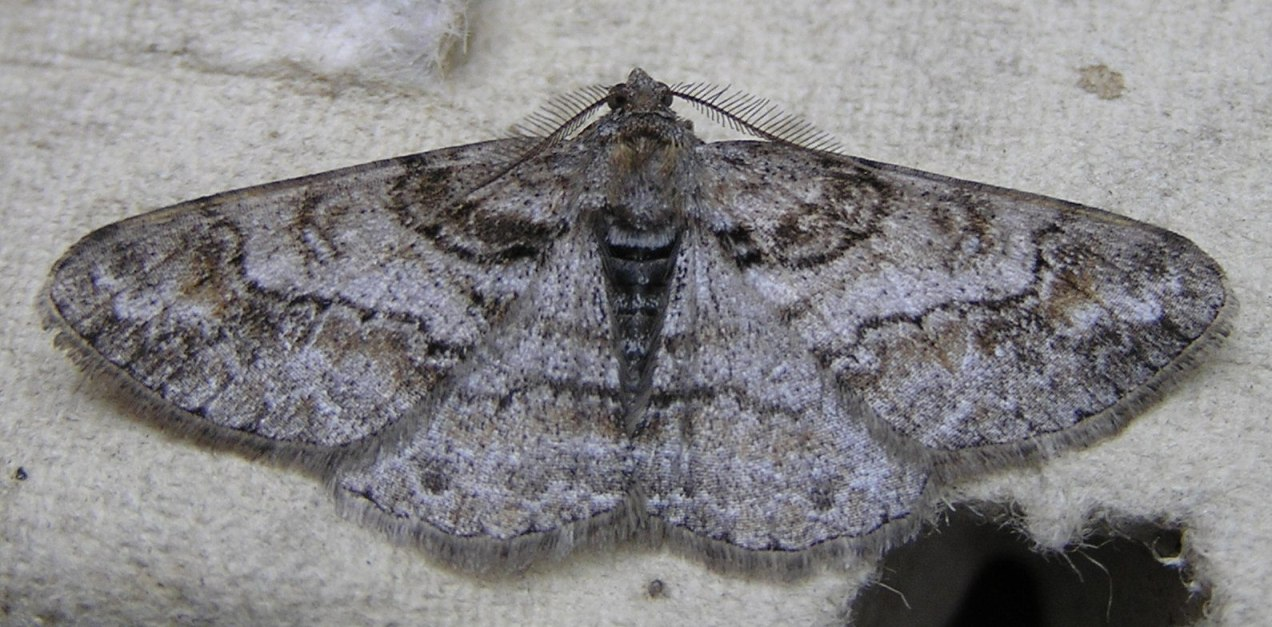

Scientific classification
- Domain: Eukaryota
- Kingdom: Animalia
- Phylum: Arthropoda
- Class: Insecta
- Order: Lepidoptera
- Family: Geometridae
- Genus: Cleora
- Species: C. cinctaria

Binomial name
- Cleora cinctaria (Denis & Schiffermüller, 1775)

Synonyms
- Geometra cinctaria Denis & Schiffermüller, 1775

= Cleora cinctaria =

Species of moth

Cleora cinctaria, the ringed carpet, is a moth of the family Geometridae. The species was first described by Michael Denis and Ignaz Schiffermüller in 1775. It is found from Europe to southern Siberia, Turkey, the Caucasus, central Asia and Mongolia. It is also found in Japan.

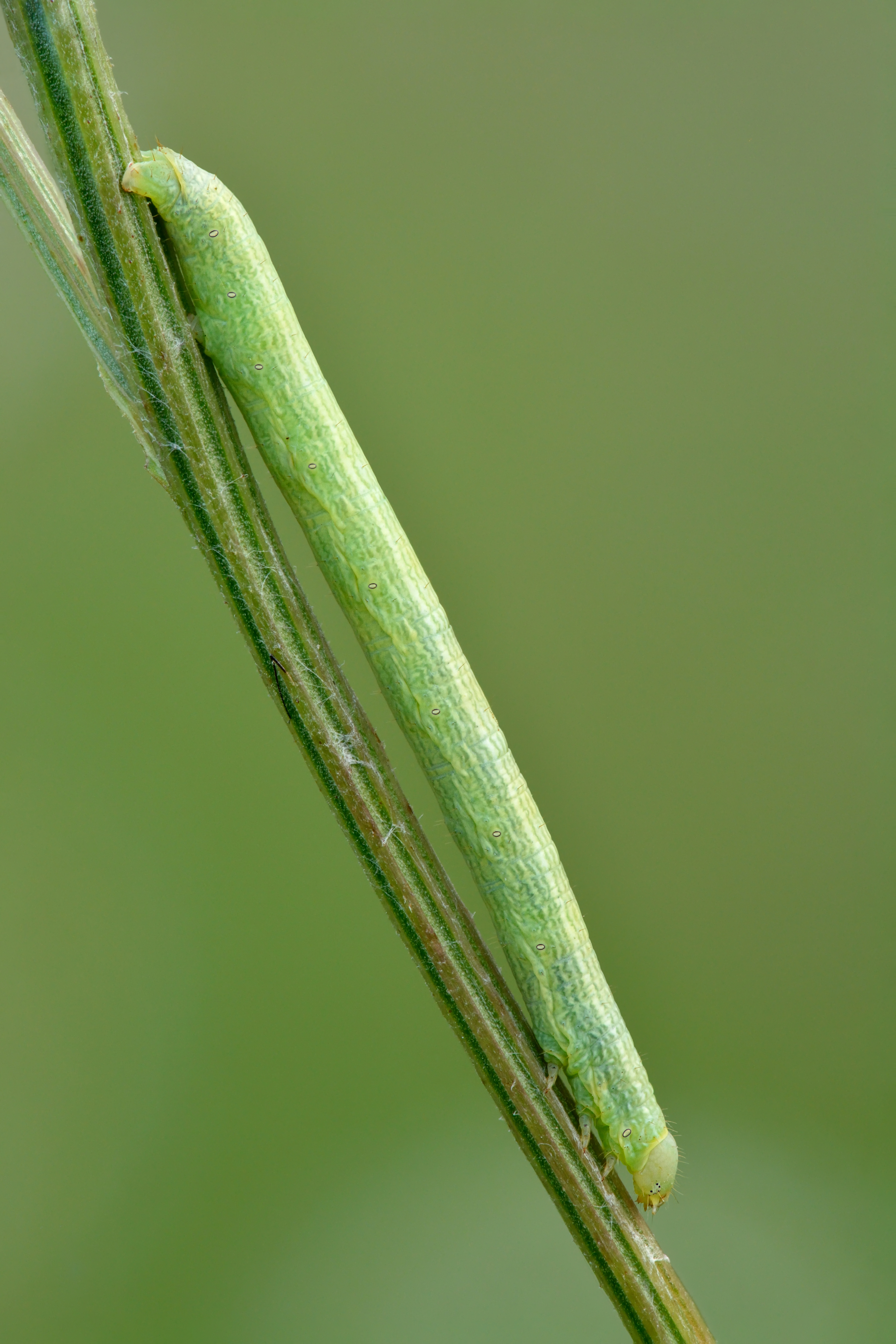
Larva

The wingspan is 28–35 mm. The wings have a light grey ground colour. The lines are brown. The intensity of the grey or brown colouration varies quite strongly. The interior crossline is band-like and widened basally, the exterior crossline is curved towards the front edge and is usually double. The brownish darkened margin has a white wavy line and white dusting. On the hindwings are dark lines and an often indistinct whitish squiggle. The first abdominal segment appears in the form of a white belt. The antennae of the males are combed on both sides, those of the females are filiform. Prout gives an account of named forma. The larva is smooth, light green with bluish green and white longitudinal lines.

Adults are on wing from April to May.

The larvae feed various plants and trees, including Betula (including Betula verrucosa), Myrica gale, Carex, Salix, Populus tremula, Rubus idaeus, Sorbus aucuparia, Vicia cracca, Rhamnus frangula, Lysimachia vulgaris, Vaccinium myrtillus and Galium verum.

== Subspecies ==
- Cleora cinctaria bowesi Richardson, 1952 (Scotland)
- Cleora cinctaria cinctaria (Denis & Schiffermüller, 1775)
- Cleora cinctaria superfumata Inoue, 1972 (south-eastern Siberia, Japan)
