= Cleora munditibia =

Scientific classification
- Kingdom: Animalia
- Phylum: Arthropoda
- Clade: Pancrustacea
- Class: Insecta
- Order: Lepidoptera
- Family: Geometridae
- Genus: Cleora
- Species: C. munditibia

Binomial name
- Cleora munditibia Prout, 1927

Species of moth

Cleora munditibia is a moth of the family Geometridae. It is found on Fiji.

The wingspan is 40–44 mm.

The larvae feed on the leaves of Mucuna aterrima.

== Subspecies ==
- Cleora munditibia munditibia
- Cleora munditibia lauensis Robinson, 1975
