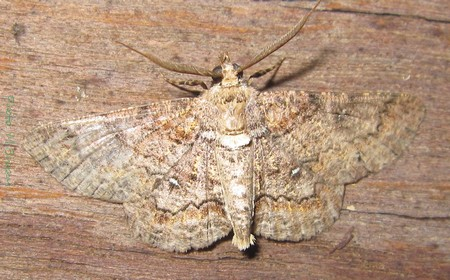

Scientific classification
- Kingdom: Animalia
- Phylum: Arthropoda
- Class: Insecta
- Order: Lepidoptera
- Family: Geometridae
- Subfamily: Ennominae
- Tribe: Boarmiini
- Genus: Cleora; Curtis, 1825

Synonyms
- Aegitrichus Butler, 1886; Carecomotis Warren, 1896; Cerotricha Guenée, 1857; Chogada Moore, 1887; Meyrickia Butler, 1884; Neocleora Janse, 1932

= Cleora =

Genus of moths

Cleora is a genus of moths in the family Geometridae. The genus was erected by John Curtis in 1825.

== Species ==
- Cleora alienaria (Walker, 1860)
- Cleora acaciaria (Boiduval, 1833)
- Cleora atriclava Prout, 1926
- Cleora biclavata (D. S. Fletcher, 1953)
- Cleora cinctaria (Denis & Schiffermüller, 1775) – ringed carpet
- Cleora cnephaea Prout, 1915
- Cleora concentraria (Snellen, 1877)
- Cleora contiguata (Moore, [1868])
- Cleora costiplaga (D. S. Fletcher, 1953)
- Cleora cucullata (D. S. Fletcher, 1953)
- Cleora decisaria (Walker, 1866)
- Cleora determinata (Walker, 1860)
- Cleora displicata (Walker, 1860)
- Cleora eugraphica (Turner, 1917)
- Cleora fortunata Blachier, 1889
- Cleora fraterna (Moore, 1888)
- Cleora godeffroyi (Butler, 1886)
- Cleora goldfinchi Prout, 1937
- Cleora illustraria (Walker, 1863)
- Cleora indiga (D. S. Fletcher)
- Cleora inelegans (Warren, 1905)
- Cleora injectaria (Walker, 1860)
- Cleora inoffensa (Swinhoe, 1902)
- Cleora insolita (Butler, 1878)
- Cleora lacteata (Warren, 1897)
- Cleora lanaris (Butler, 1886)
- Cleora leucophaea (Butler, 1878)
- Cleora licornaria (Guenée, 1857)
- Cleora mjoebergi Prout, 1926
- Cleora munditibia Prout, 1927
- Cleora nigronotaria (Wileman, 1911)
- Cleora onycha (D. S. Fletcher, 1953)
- Cleora panagrata (Walker, 1862)
- Cleora pendleburyi Prout, 1929
- Cleora perfumosa (Warren, 1896)
- Cleora perlepidaria (Warren, 1900)
- Cleora processaria Walker
- Cleora projecta (Walker, 1860) – projected gray
- Cleora propulsaria (Walker, 1860)
- Cleora pupillata (Walker, 1860)
- Cleora repetita (Butler, 1882)
- Cleora repulsaria (Walker, 1860)
- Cleora rostrata (D. S. Fletcher, 1953)
- Cleora rothkirchi (Strand, 1914)
- Cleora sabulata (D. S. Fletcher, 1953)
- Cleora samoana (Butler, 1886)
- Cleora scriptaria (Walker, 1860) – kawakawa looper
- Cleora sublunaria (Guenée, 1857) – double-lined gray
- Cleora tamsi D. S. Fletcher, 1967
- Cleora taprobana D. S. Fletcher, 1953
- Cleora tenebrata (D. S. Fletcher, 1953)
- Cleora thyris D. S. Fletcher, 1967
- Cleora tora Prout, 1926
- Cleora toulgoetae (Herbulot, 1961)
- Cleora transversaria (Pagenstecher, 1907)
- Cleora tulbaghata (Felder & Rogenhofer, 1875)
- Cleora undaria (Fabricius, 1794)
- Cleora viettei (Herbulot, 1958)
