= Cleora tora =

Scientific classification
- Kingdom: Animalia
- Phylum: Arthropoda
- Clade: Pancrustacea
- Class: Insecta
- Order: Lepidoptera
- Family: Geometridae
- Genus: Cleora
- Species: C. tora

Binomial name
- Cleora tora Prout, 1926

Species of moth

Cleora tora is a moth of the family Geometridae. It is known from northern Madagascar.

It has a wingspan between 21 and 31 mm and is close to Cleora proemia Prout, 1917 in some details of structure.
