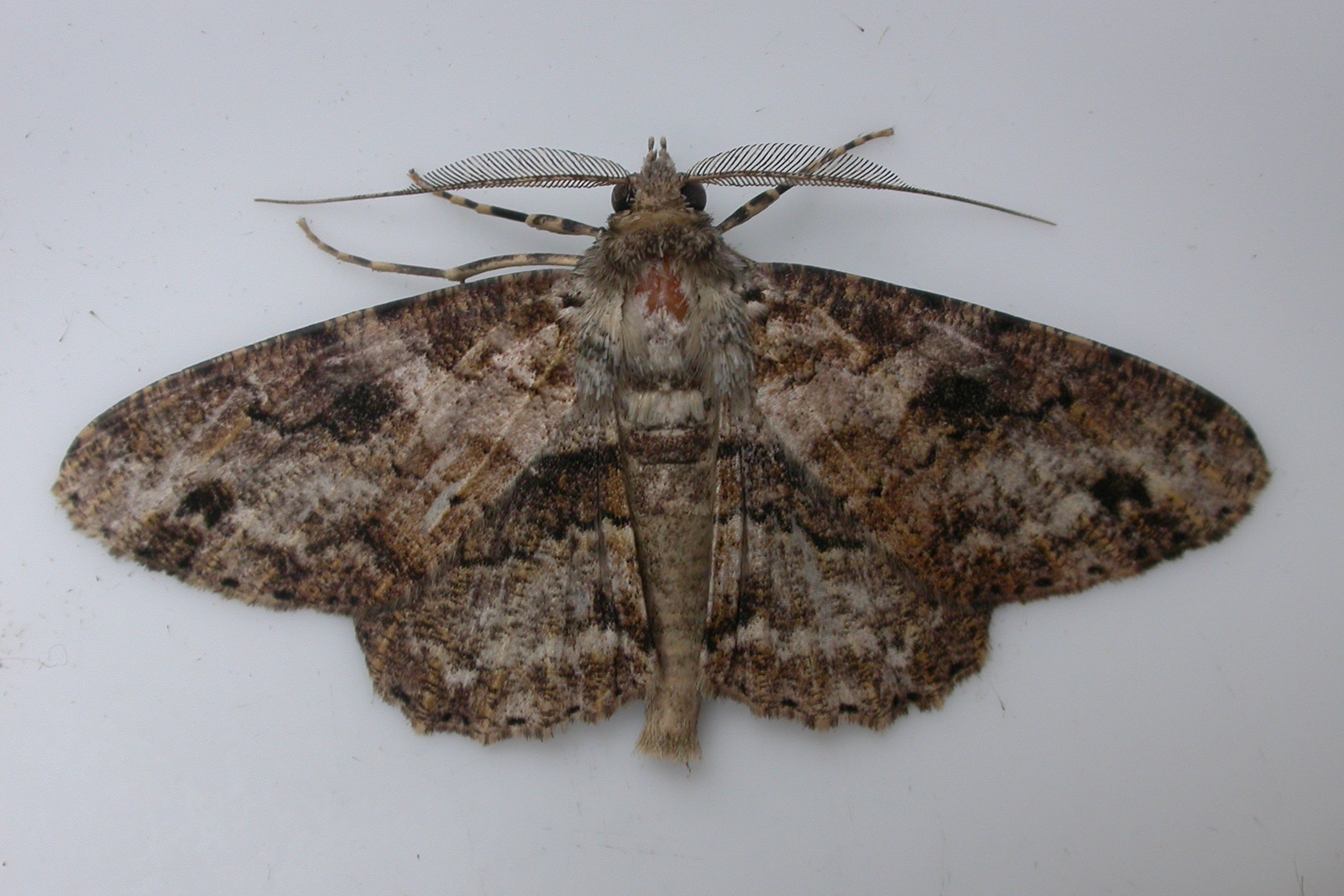

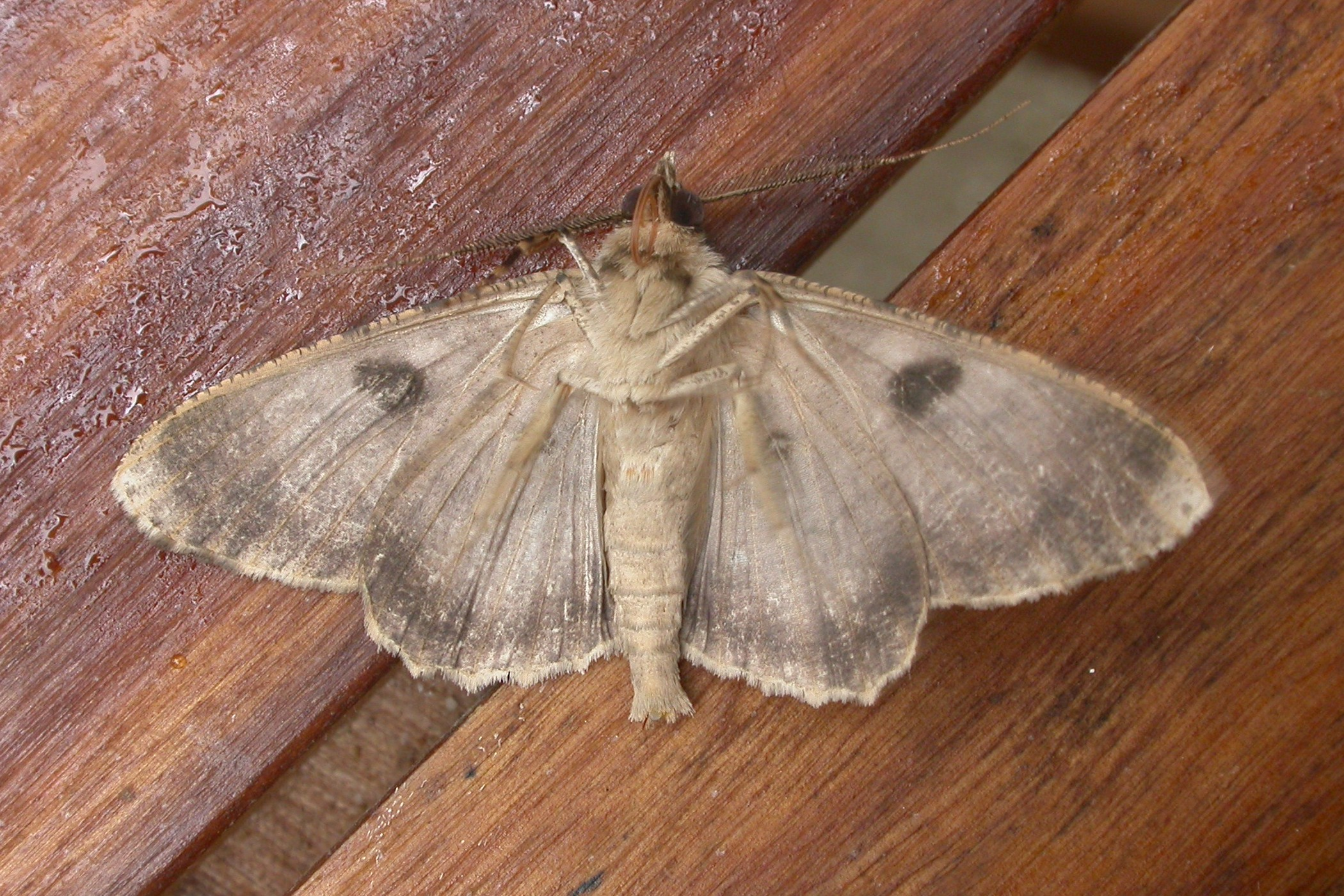

Scientific classification
- Domain: Eukaryota
- Kingdom: Animalia
- Phylum: Arthropoda
- Class: Insecta
- Order: Lepidoptera
- Family: Geometridae
- Genus: Cleora
- Species: C. repetita

Binomial name
- Cleora repetita (Butler, 1882)

Synonyms
- Boarmia repetita Butler, 1882; Boarmia inflexaria Snellen, 1881; Boarmia epistictis Meyrick, 1889; Chogada proletaria Swinhoe, 1915; Syneora speciosa Turner, 1947

= Cleora repetita =

Species of moth

Cleora repetita is a species of moth of the family Geometridae first described by Arthur Gardiner Butler in 1882. It is found from Sundaland to Australia and the Solomon Islands.

The wingspan is about 40 mm.

The larvae feed on Terminalia, Premna, Persea (including Persea americana), Callistemon (including Callistemon saligna), Eucalyptus (including Eucalyptus pilularis), Lithomyrtus (including Lithomyrtus obtusa) and Flindersia (including Flindersia australis) species.
