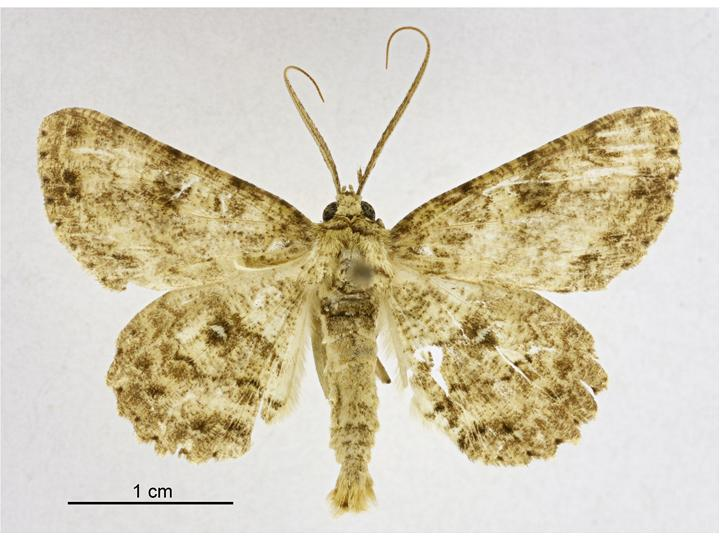

Scientific classification
- Domain: Eukaryota
- Kingdom: Animalia
- Phylum: Arthropoda
- Class: Insecta
- Order: Lepidoptera
- Family: Geometridae
- Genus: Cleora
- Species: C. samoana

Binomial name
- Cleora samoana (Butler, 1886)

Synonyms
- Boarmia samoana Butler, 1886

= Cleora samoana =

Species of moth

Cleora samoana, the forest looper caterpillar, is a moth of the family Geometridae. It is found on Fiji, Niue, Samoa and Tonga.

The larvae feed on the leaves of Citrus species.

== Subspecies ==
- Cleora samoana samoana
- Cleora samoana fijiensis Robinson, 1975
- Cleora samoana noatau Robinson, 1975
