= Cleora taprobana =

Scientific classification
- Domain: Eukaryota
- Kingdom: Animalia
- Phylum: Arthropoda
- Class: Insecta
- Order: Lepidoptera
- Family: Geometridae
- Genus: Cleora
- Species: C. taprobana

Binomial name
- Cleora taprobana D. S. Fletcher, 1953

Species of moth

Cleora taprobana is a moth of the family Geometridae described by David Stephen Fletcher in 1953. It is found in Sri Lanka.
