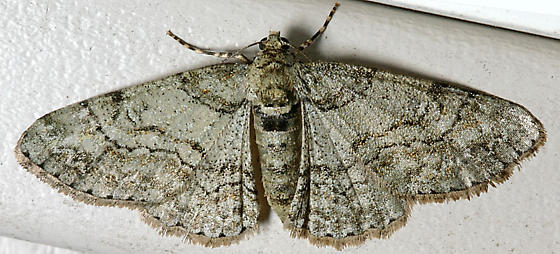

Scientific classification
- Kingdom: Animalia
- Phylum: Arthropoda
- Class: Insecta
- Order: Lepidoptera
- Family: Geometridae
- Genus: Cleora
- Species: C. projecta

Binomial name
- Cleora projecta (Walker, 1860)

Synonyms
- Cleora manitoba (Grossbeck, 1911)

= Cleora projecta =

Species of moth

Cleora projecta, the projecta gray or purplish double-lined gray, is a moth of the family Geometridae. It is found in eastern North America, including South Carolina.

The wingspan is about 28 mm.
