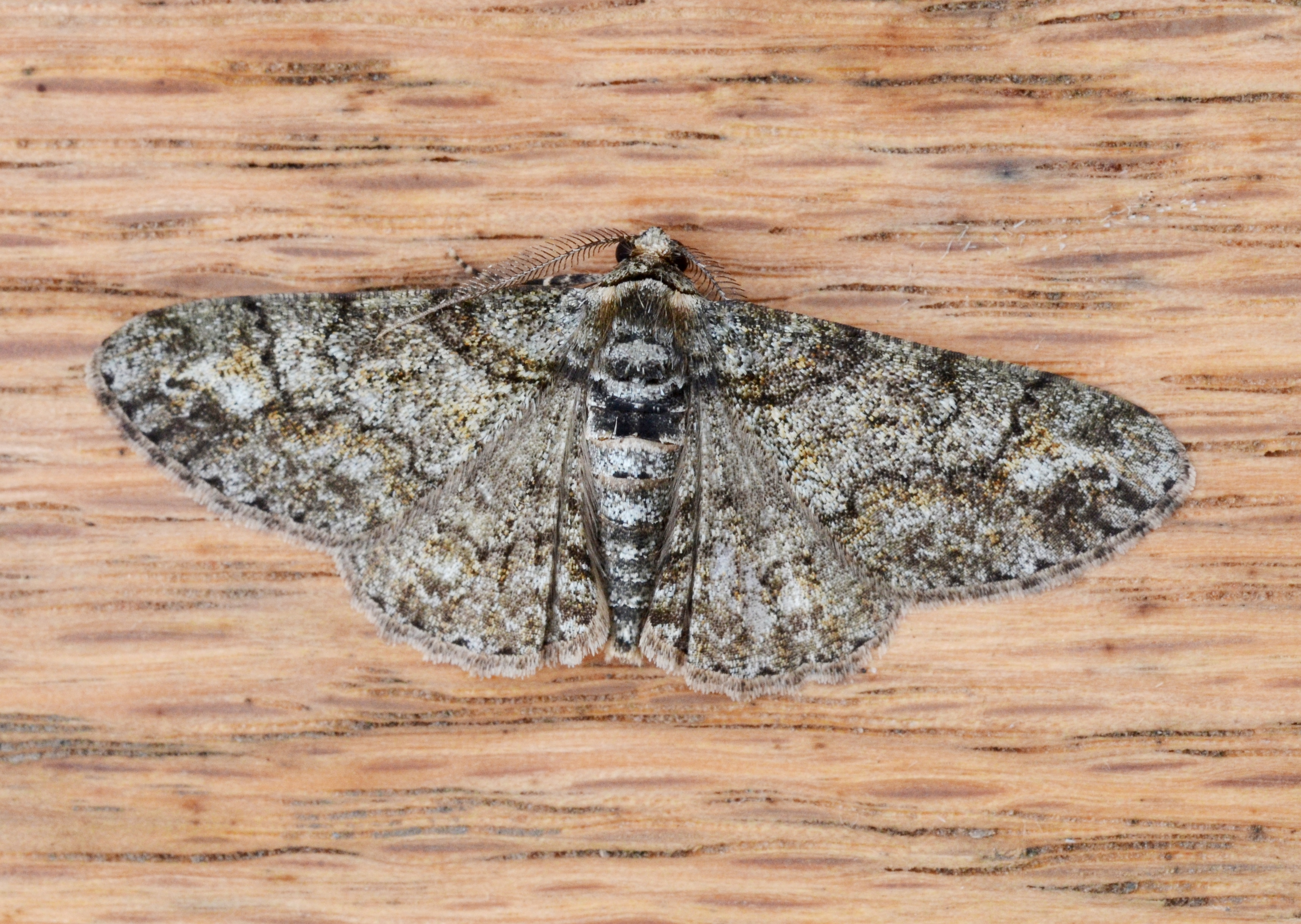

Scientific classification
- Kingdom: Animalia
- Phylum: Arthropoda
- Class: Insecta
- Order: Lepidoptera
- Family: Geometridae
- Genus: Cleora
- Species: C. sublunaria

Binomial name
- Cleora sublunaria (Guenee, 1857)

Synonyms
- Boarmia sublunaria Guenee, 1857; Cleora areataria Broadwell, 1907; Boarmia atrolinearia Hulst, 1888; Boarmia transfixaria Walker, 1860

= Cleora sublunaria =

Species of moth

Cleora sublunaria, the double-lined gray moth, is a species of moth of the family Geometridae. It is found in North America, where it has been recorded from south-eastern United States west to Texas.

The length of the forewings is 13–17 mm for males and 14–17 mm for females. Adults are mostly on wing from February to June in one generation per year.

The larvae feed on Quercus and Comptonia species. Larvae can be found from June to July.
