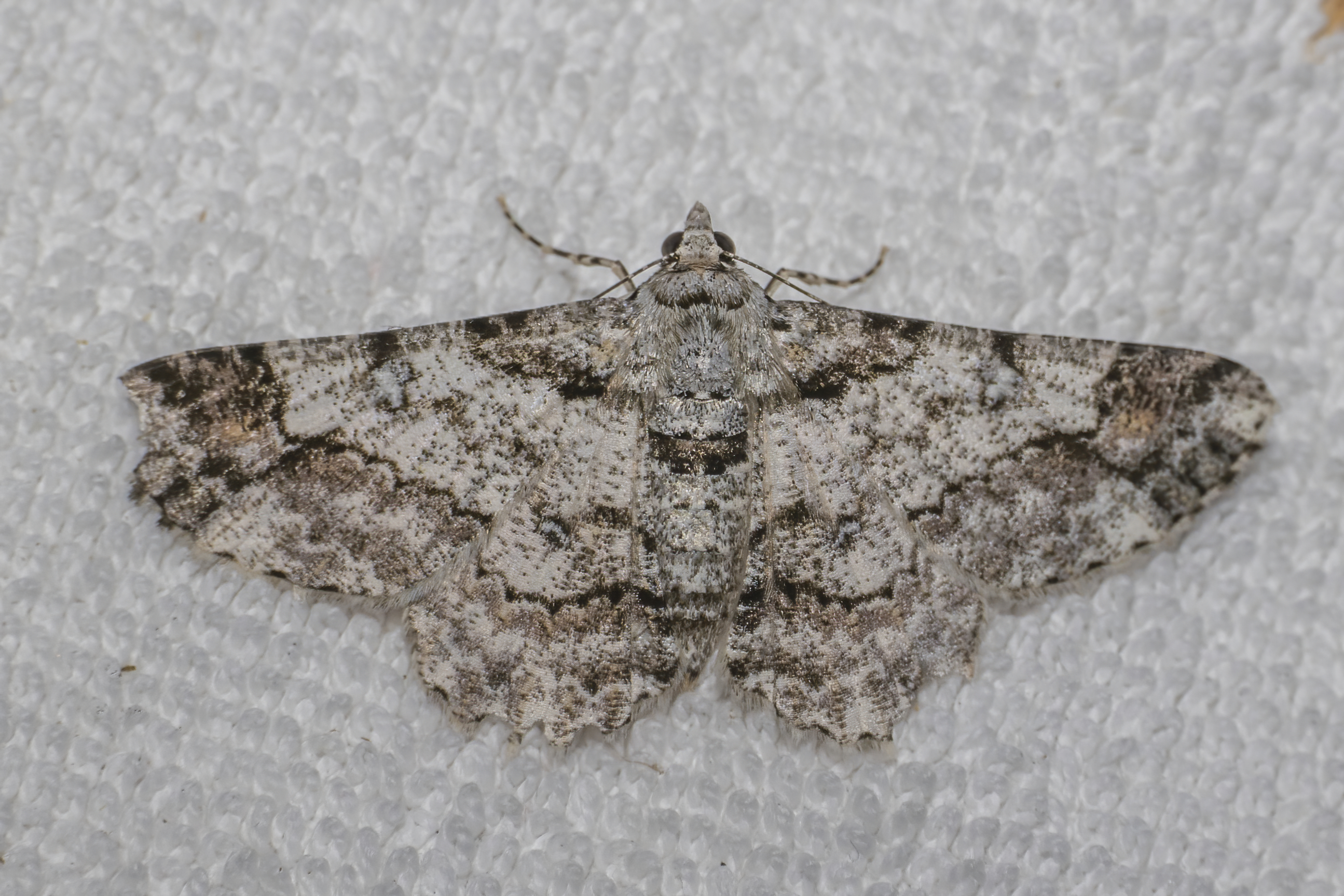
- Sinharaja Forest Reserve, Sri Lanka

Scientific classification
- Kingdom: Animalia
- Phylum: Arthropoda
- Clade: Pancrustacea
- Class: Insecta
- Order: Lepidoptera
- Family: Geometridae
- Genus: Cleora
- Species: C. fraterna

Binomial name
- Cleora fraterna (Moore, 1888)

Synonyms
- Chogada fraterna Moore, 1888

= Cleora fraterna =

Species of moth

Cleora fraterna is a moth of the family Geometridae. It is found in China, Taiwan, Nepal, India and Bhutan.
