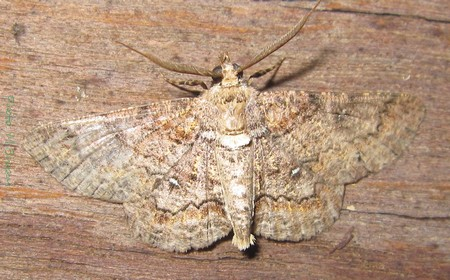

Scientific classification
- Domain: Eukaryota
- Kingdom: Animalia
- Phylum: Arthropoda
- Class: Insecta
- Order: Lepidoptera
- Family: Geometridae
- Genus: Cleora
- Species: C. acaciaria

Binomial name
- Cleora acaciaria (Boisduval, 1833)

Synonyms
- Boamia acaciaria Boisduval, 1833; Cleora acacicola Holloway, 1979; Cleora acerata D. S. Fletcher, 1967; Cleora acuata D. S. Fletcher, 1953; Cleora aculeata D. S. Fletcher, 1967; Cleora acutiorata D. S. Fletcher, 1953; Cleora adustaria Preissecker; Cleora aequivoca Prout, 1929

= Cleora acaciaria =

Species of moth

Cleora acaciaria is a moth of the family Geometridae described by Jean Baptiste Boisduval in 1833. It is found in Angola, Cameroon, Comoros, Congo, Ghana, Madagascar, Réunion São Tomé and Príncipe and the United Arab Emirates.

The wingspan is 28–33 mm.

The larvae feed on various plants and trees, including Rutaceae (including Toddalia asiatica), Ericaceae (including Augauria salicifolia), Verbenaceae (including Stachytarpheta urticifolia) and Asteraceae species.
