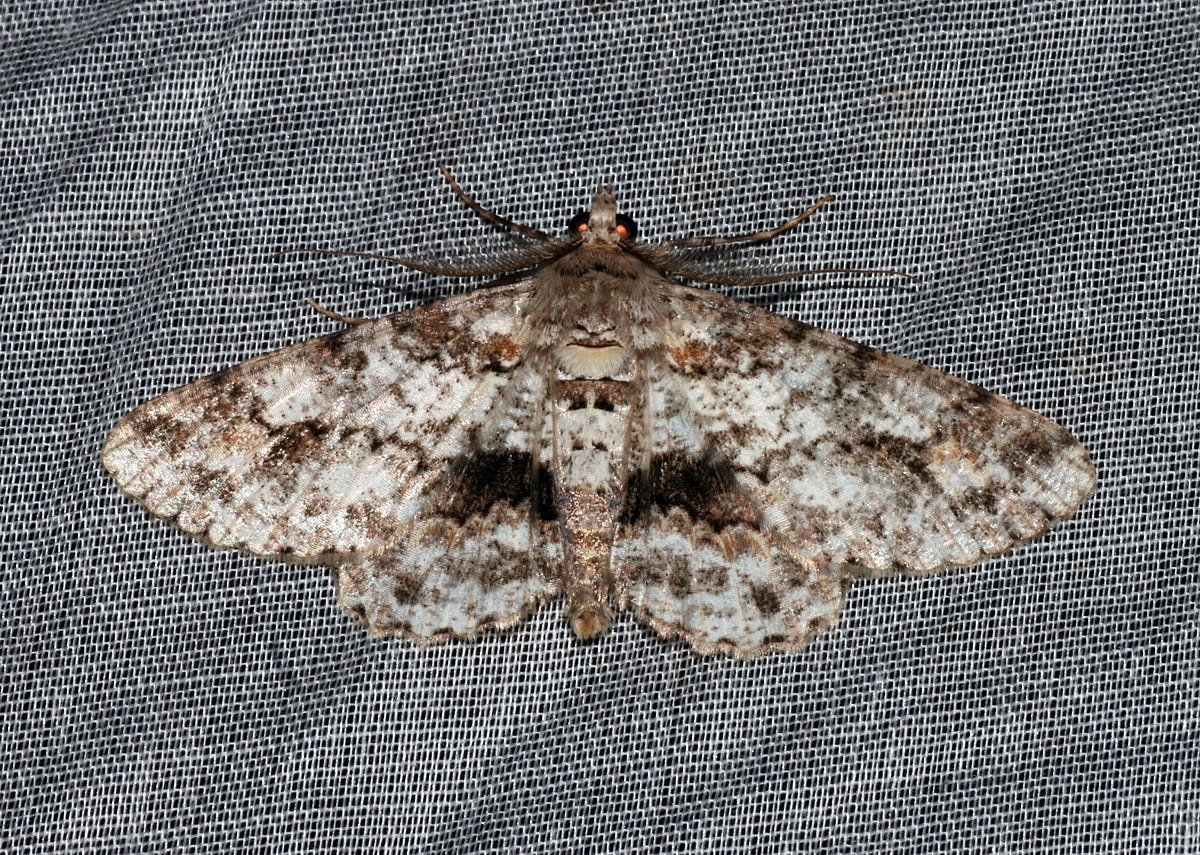

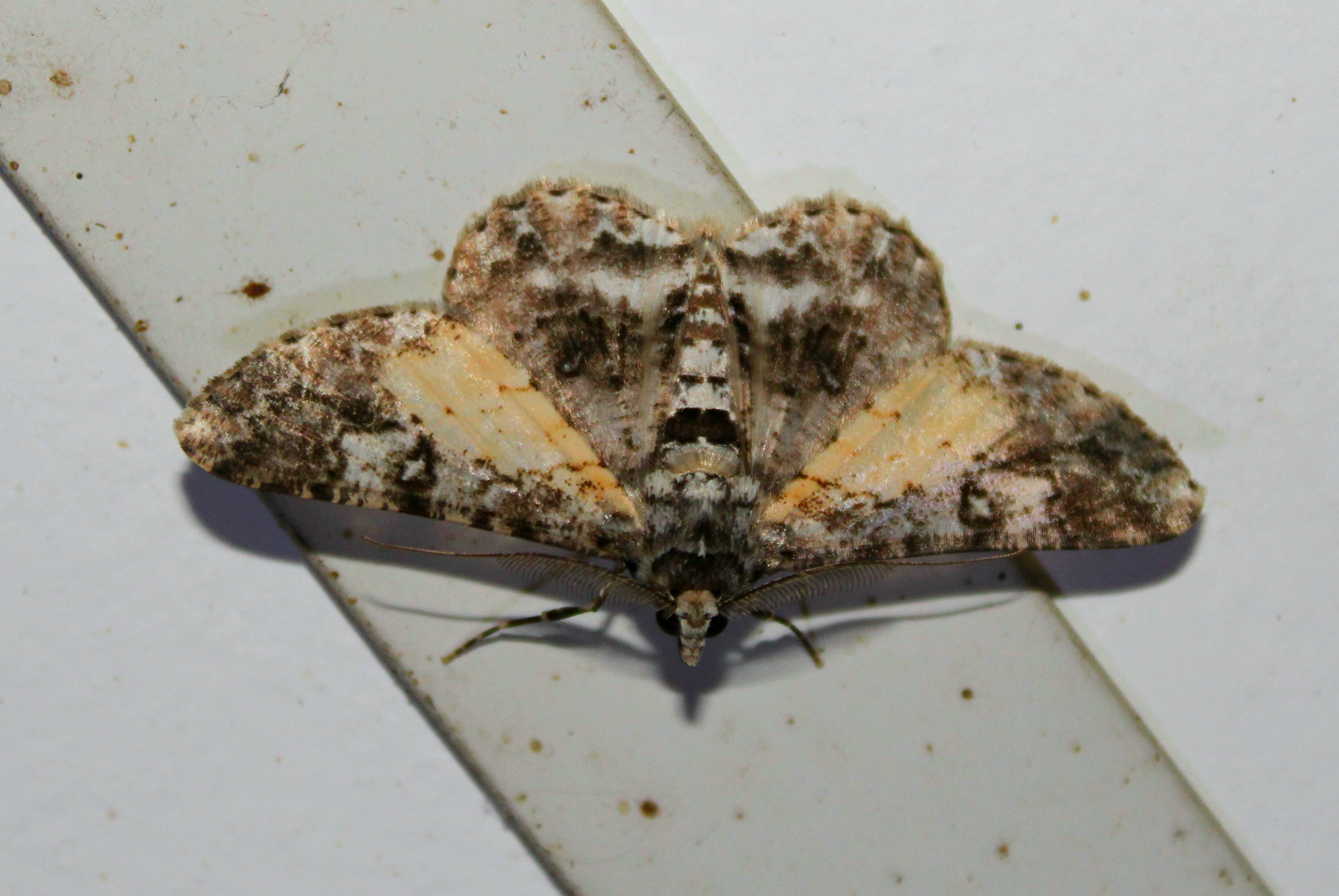

Scientific classification
- Kingdom: Animalia
- Phylum: Arthropoda
- Class: Insecta
- Order: Lepidoptera
- Family: Geometridae
- Genus: Cleora
- Species: C. alienaria

Binomial name
- Cleora alienaria (Walker, 1860)

Synonyms
- Boarmia alienaria Walker, 1860; Boarmia gelidaria Walker, 1863; ?Chogada alienaria ab. nigrifasciata Warren, 1905; Chogada rasanaria Swinhoe, 1915; Cleora alienaria fumipennis Prout, 1929

= Cleora alienaria =

Species of moth

Cleora alienaria is a moth of the family Geometridae first described by Francis Walker in 1860. It is found in Sri Lanka, the Indian subregion to the Andaman Islands, Thailand, Sundaland, Taiwan, and Lesser Sundas as far east as Timor and Christmas Island.

== Description ==
Adults are polymorphic and show clear color differences; this leads to confusion of classification. The discal spot of the forewing is clearly defined. The caterpillar is a leafy green color with fine linear marbling. There is a narrow, lenticular, transverse white bar anterior to dorsolateral brown tubercles. This white bar is divided centrally by a black triangle. The caterpillar is known to feed on Falcataria moluccana, Acacia mangium, Cinnamomum, Sambucus, and Dalbergia monetaria.

== Subspecies ==
Three subspecies are recognized.

- Cleora alienaria fumipennis Prout, 1929 - Christmas Islands
- Cleora alienaria gelidaria Walker, 1863
- Cleora alienaria rasanaria Swinhoe, 1915

== Gallery ==
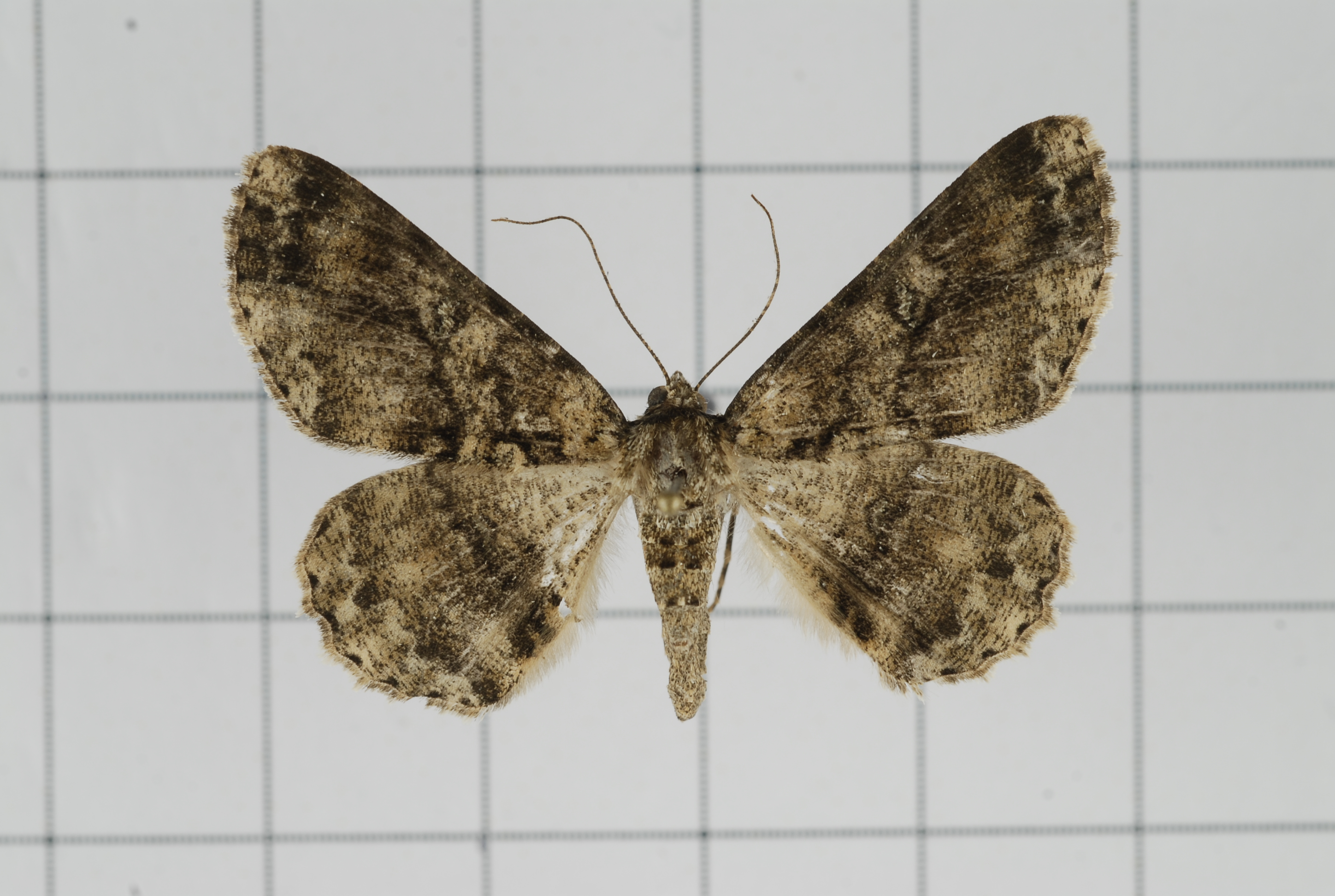

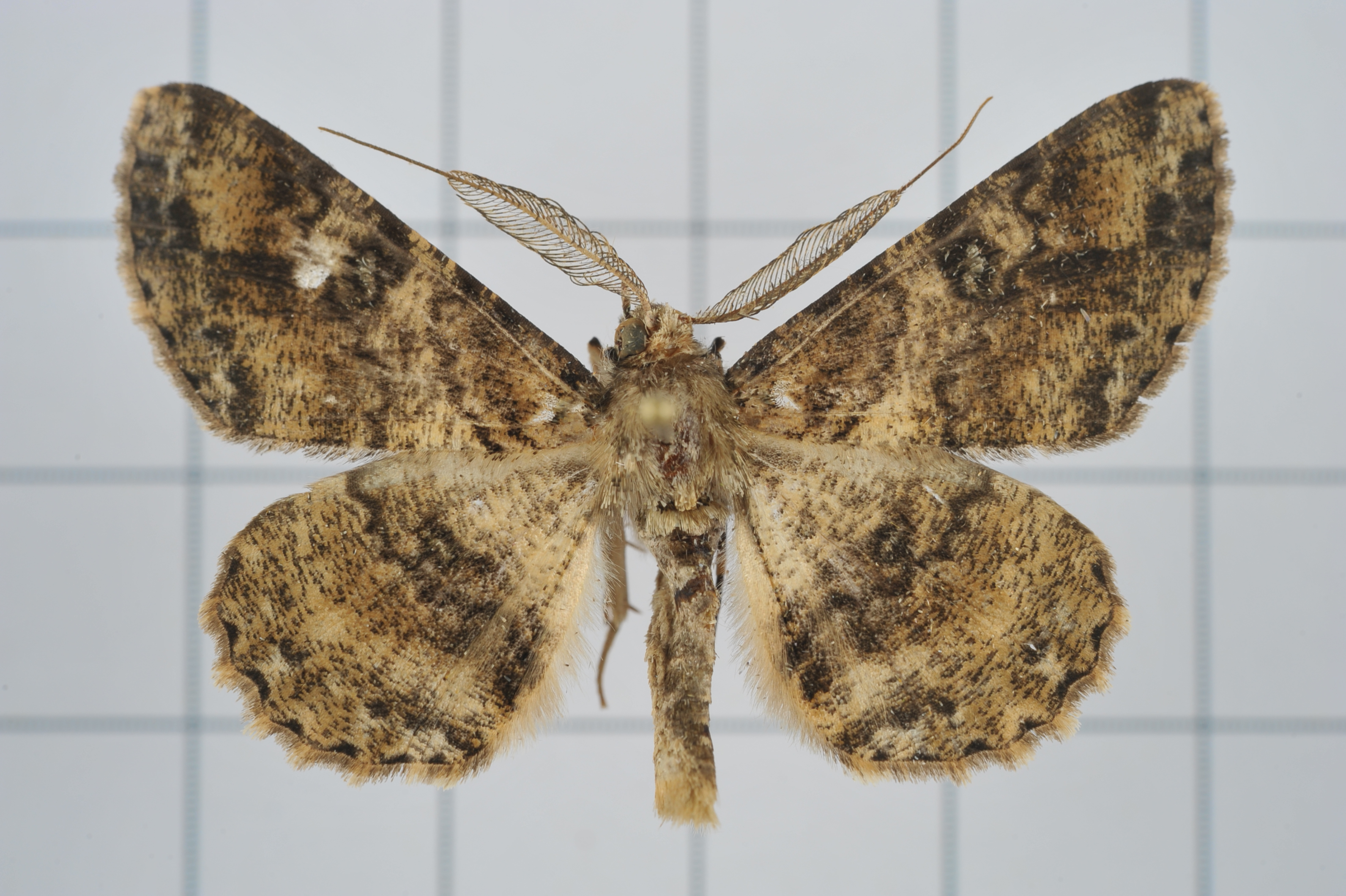

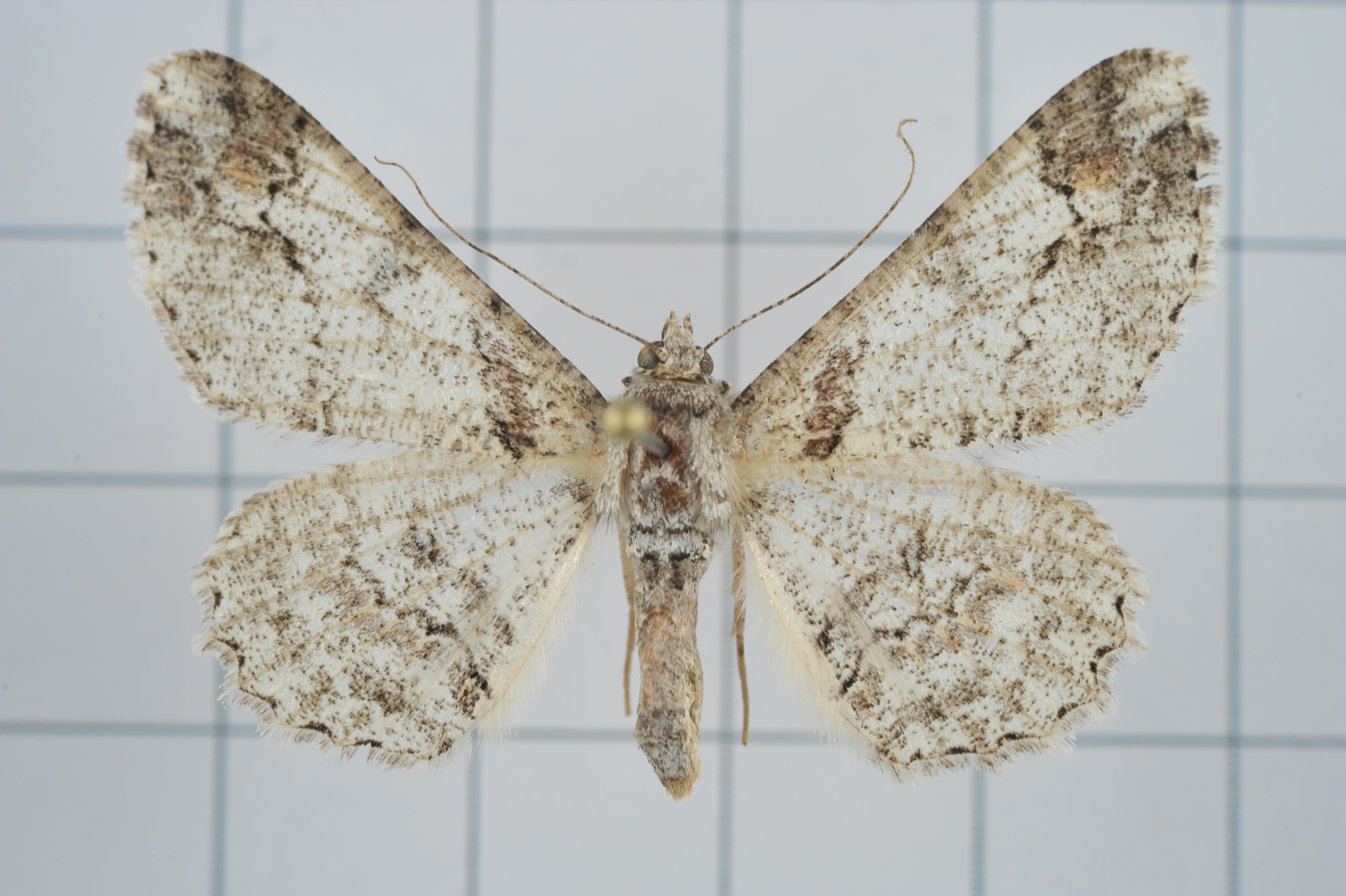

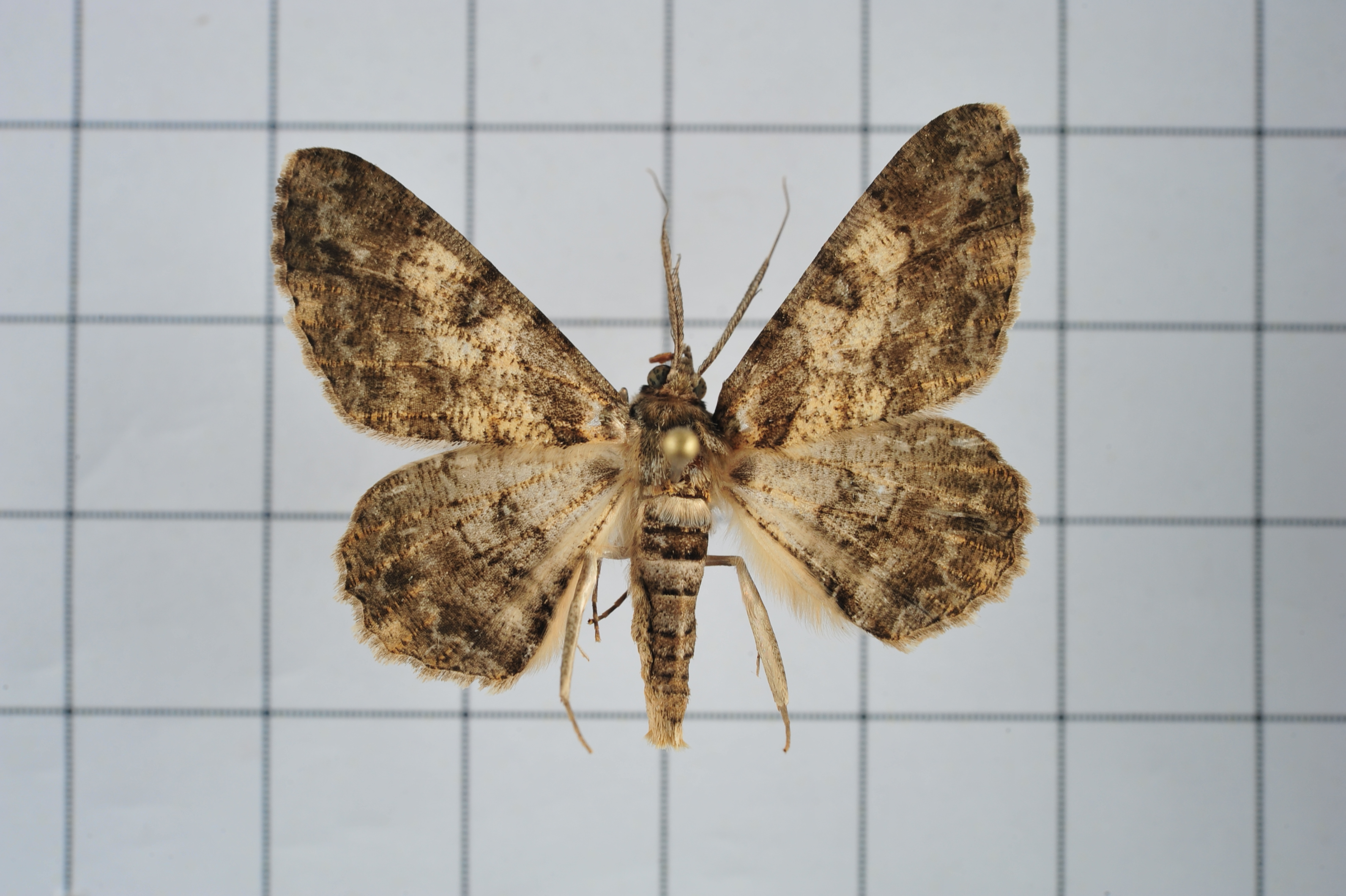
