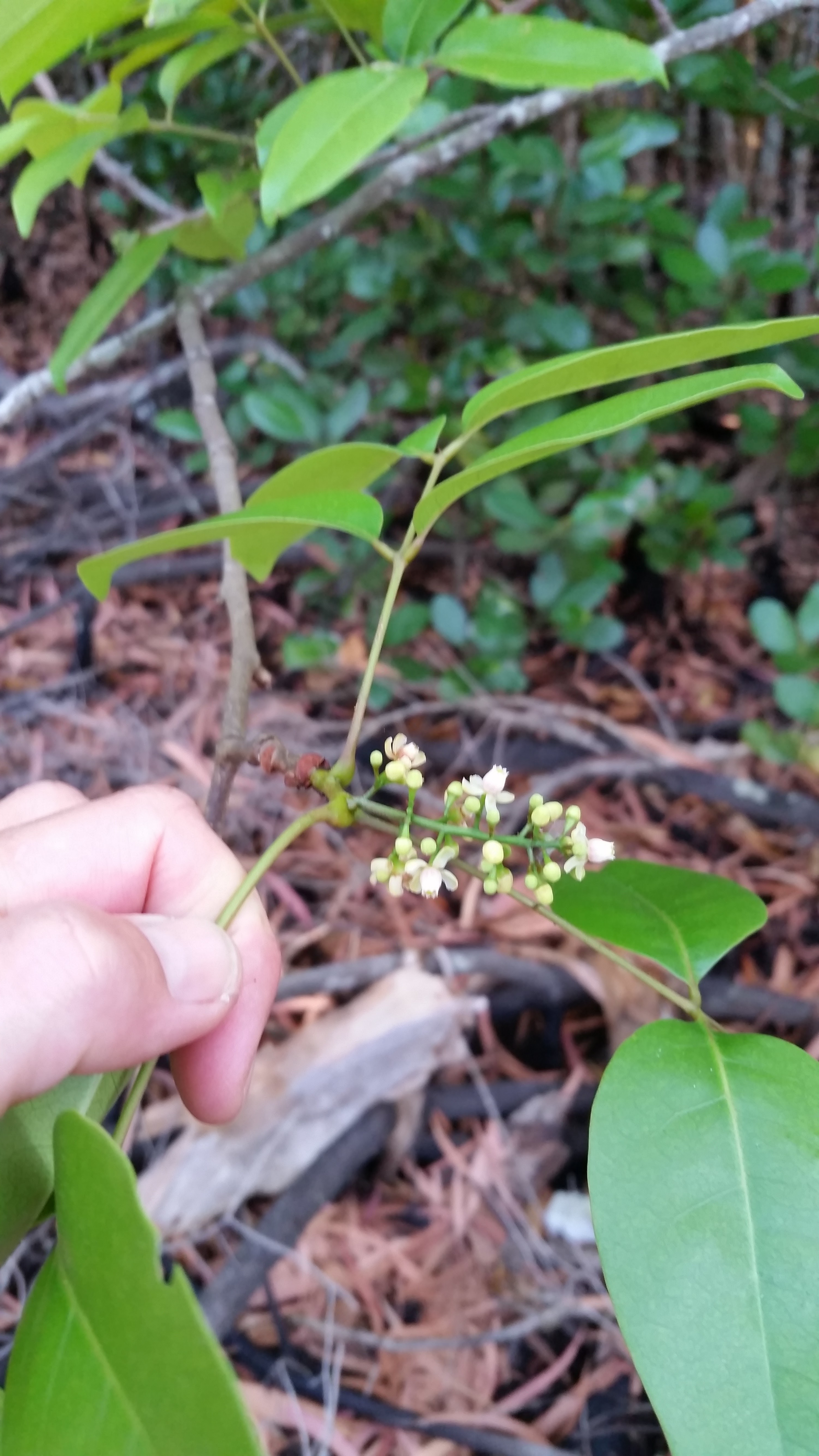
- Flowering

Conservation status
- Least Concern (NCA)

Scientific classification
- Kingdom: Plantae
- Clade: Tracheophytes
- Clade: Angiosperms
- Clade: Eudicots
- Clade: Rosids
- Order: Sapindales
- Family: Meliaceae
- Genus: Xylocarpus
- Species: X. rumphii

Binomial name
- Xylocarpus rumphii Mabb.

Synonyms
- Carapa rumphii Kostel.; Aglaia zollingeri C.DC.; Xylocarpus forstenii Miq.; Xylocarpus zollingeri (C.DC.) Koord.

= Xylocarpus rumphii =

Species of flowering plant

Xylocarpus rumphii is a small tree in the mahogany family Meliaceae which is native to coastlines of Madagascar, southeast Asia, Queensland, and the southwestern Pacific islands.
