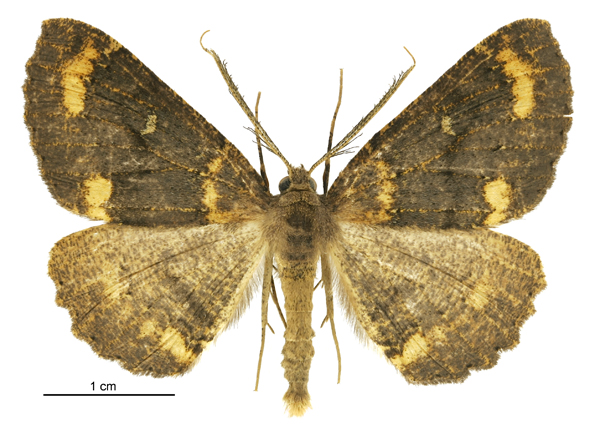
- Male
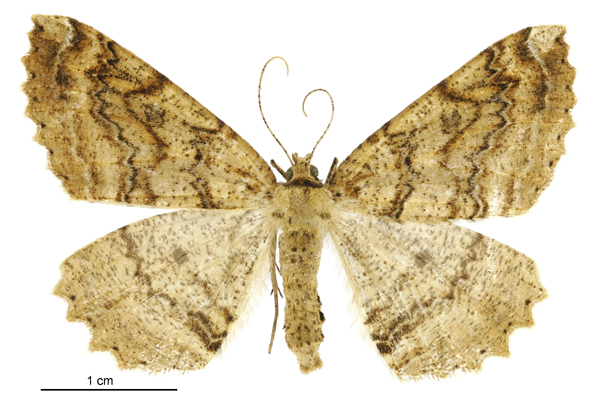
- Female

Scientific classification
- Kingdom: Animalia
- Phylum: Arthropoda
- Clade: Pancrustacea
- Class: Insecta
- Order: Lepidoptera
- Family: Geometridae
- Genus: Cleora
- Species: C. scriptaria

Binomial name
- Cleora scriptaria (Walker, 1860)

Synonyms
- Tephrosia scriptaria Walker, 1860; Scotosia stigmaticata Walker, 1862; Scotosia panagrata Walker, 1862; Barsine panagrata Walker, 1862; Selidosema panagrata Walker, 1862; Angerona menanaria Walker, 1863; Epirranthis antipodaria Felder, 1875; Hyperythra arenacea Butler, 1879; Hyperythra desiccate Butler, 1879

= Cleora scriptaria =

Species of moth

Cleora scriptaria, the kawakawa looper moth, is a moth in the family Geometridae. It is endemic to New Zealand.

== Taxonomy ==
C. scriptaria was first described by Francis Walker in 1860 as Tephrosia scriptaria using specimens obtained from Major Parry.

== Description ==
The Kawakawa looper moth varies considerably in both colour and size during its adult stage of life. The coloration of the Kawakawa looper moth has many variations with the most common having yellow/ brown mottled forewings. Other variations include big yellow patches on darker coloured wings. Both male and female moths have unique spots located on the middle of their wings that range from black to white and cream. The sexes can be distinguished by the antennae like in most moths, with the males having feathered antennae and the females having filiform antennae. Distinguishing the gender of the moth can be determined by the feathered like antennae that occurs only in the males, whereas the female's antennae remain shorter and featherless. While the moth is feeding, the antenna can be seen in an uncoiled state which is helpful in distinguishing the moth from other related species. The body of adults ranges between 10 – 15 mm long and the wingspan can be between 30 and 55 mm wide. Caterpillars are light green at first, eventually transitioning to a light brown as they age.

== Range ==
Cleora scriptaria is endemic to New Zealand. It is fairly common across the country.

== Habitat ==
Kawakawa loopers are generally found near or on kawakawa and other host plants. Adults hide among leaf litter or on tree trunks, where their mottled patterns provide camouflage. The caterpillars are usually on the leaves, forming distinctive holes as they feed.

=== Host plants ===
The caterpillars of this species feed on the leaves of the kawakawa at night, leaving a distinctive pattern of holes. They can also be found on horopito (Pseudowintera sp.), wineberry/makomako (Aristotelia serrata), ramarama (Lophomyrtus sp.), akeake (Dodonaea viscosa), and even introduced feijoas (Feijoa sellowiana). The leaves of the kawakawa possess a range of herbivore-deterrent chemicals, however this does not stop the caterpillar from feeding on them. The larger caterpillars tend to make notches on the edges of the leaves.

== Ecology ==
=== Life cycle/phenology ===
==== Moths ====
At the moth stage the Kawakawa looper moth is fully developed with two pairs of wings and three pairs of legs. The head holds two long antennae as well as a long rostrum which is a snout like projection which extends from the heads of insects which are usually in a coiled-up position. This position of the rostrum changes when the moth chooses to feed on nectar flowers. Female moths who are newly out of the cocoon will let off a pheromone which is a “mixture of volatile chemicals” to attract the male Kawakawa looper moth. The antenna for the males are seen to be different as they bare adaptations for breeding purposes as they contain numerous sensory cells that detect chemicals that are released in the air. Therefore, they are able to pick up and sense a recently emerged female's pheromones that attract the male.

==== Eggs and caterpillars ====
The female Kawakawa looper moth will lay her eggs on the leaves or stems of their favoured host plant usually the kawakawa plant. The female will lay her eggs in clusters of 3–12 and the appearance of the eggs are pale green and cylinder like in shape.

Once developed the caterpillar will chew on the egg in order to make its way out thereafter moving onto young leaves as a food supply. This now young caterpillar is pale green in colour and has dark or white stripes down each side of its body. They will situate themselves on leaf veins and around the edges of leaves where they will lay themselves as flat as possible as an act of camouflage. As they grow which they do so by moulting and changing skins when this happens they tend to change colour and may become pale brown the older they get. During this change the caterpillar will move to place itself between plant crevices and between leaves during the daytime hours.

==== Pupae ====
A fully grown caterpillar will lower itself towards the ground and hide itself in amongst leaf litter. Within this leaf litter the caterpillar will tunnel its way into the top debris of the soil. Here is where the caterpillar will once again moult and thereafter be in the form of a pupa. The appearance of the pupa is brown in colour with two slender processes at the end of the abdomen known as the cremaster which is used to attach the hind end of a butterfly or moths pupa to a twig or other structure. When the moth is ready to come out it will split down its side in order to emerge. Once the moth has emerged it will climb onto a structure of support being a branch or twig and will hang on while it attempts to expand its wings and harden its body structure.

=== Predators, parasites, and diseases ===
==== Parasites and parasitoids ====
A nematode has been known to infect the caterpillar of the kawakawa moth as well as six known caterpillar and pupal parasitoids. The parasitoids live inside the kawakawa moth during its caterpillar stage, once the parasitoid has reached its maturity it will leave the body of the caterpillar and attach itself to the leaf of the kawakawa plant and weave a cocoon.

==== Predators ====
The true bug Cardiastethus consors (Anthocoridae) has been reported feeding on the eggs and caterpillars of kawakawa loopers in captivity. Birds, bats, spiders and carnivorous insects are also likely to predate on all life stages of kawakawa looper, although none are officially recorded to do so.

=== Additional information ===
When there is a need for the kawakawa looper moth to camouflage itself the moth uses its brown colouration as well as its scalloped wing edges to help resemble bark or dead leaves. When they are in their younger stages of being a caterpillar their green colour helps them merge in with the green leaves of the kawakawa plant and when they are in their older caterpillar stages the brown colour helps them merge with twigs. These methods of camouflage have been known to protect the looper moth against attacks from birds. The way the kawakawa looper moth moves is by looping itself along its surface, bringing its back end up towards its front legs while using its proleg, a fleshy leg that occurs on an abdominal segment of some insect larvae but not in the adult. While Cleora scriptaria does not necessarily hold much if any cultural value its main host plant, Kawakawa, certainly does. It is known as one of the most important herbs for Traditional Maori medicine. The antimicrobial properties in the plant allow it to be used for treatment of wounds or cuts and even some skin conditions.

== Gallery ==
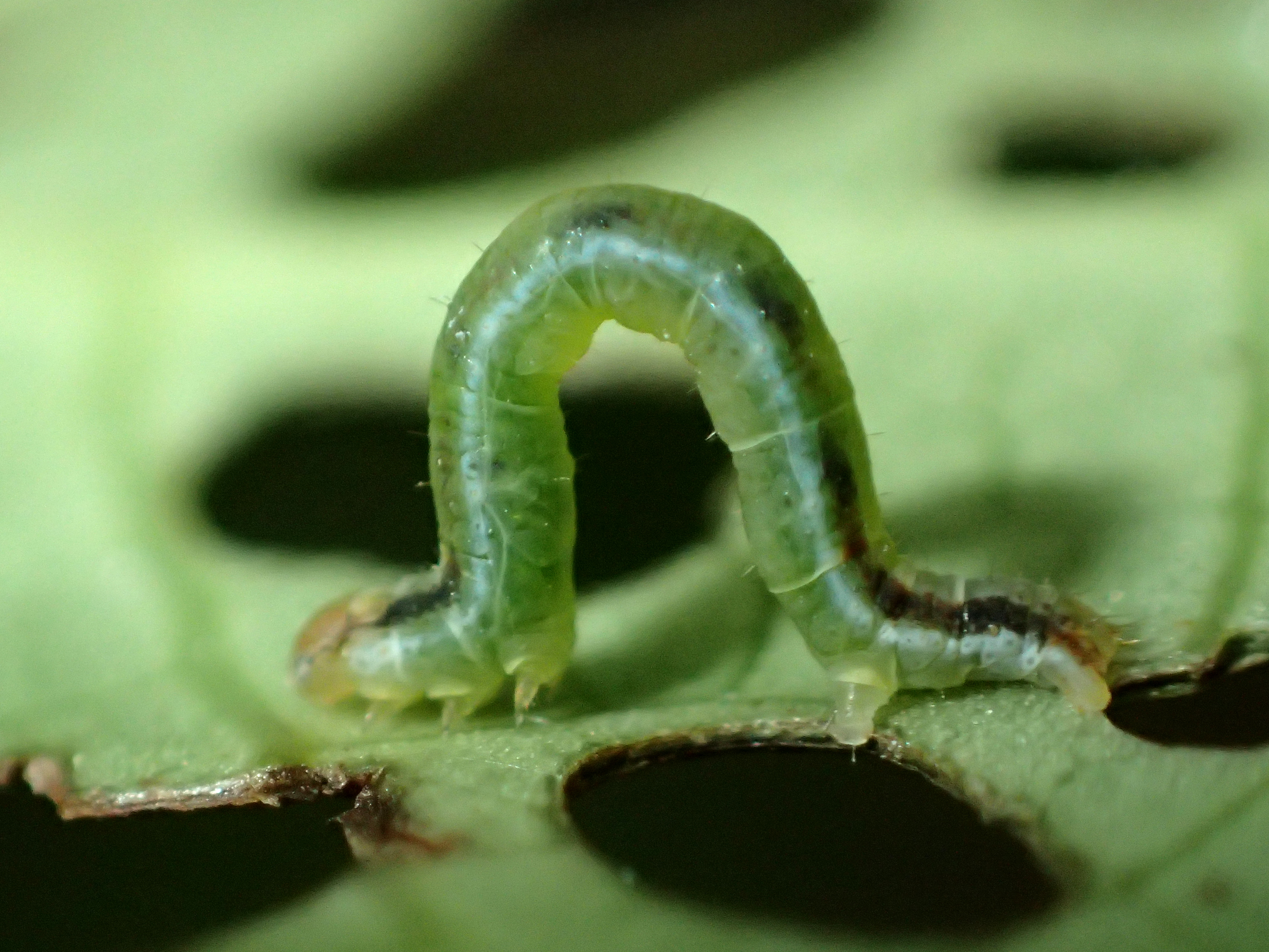
Larva

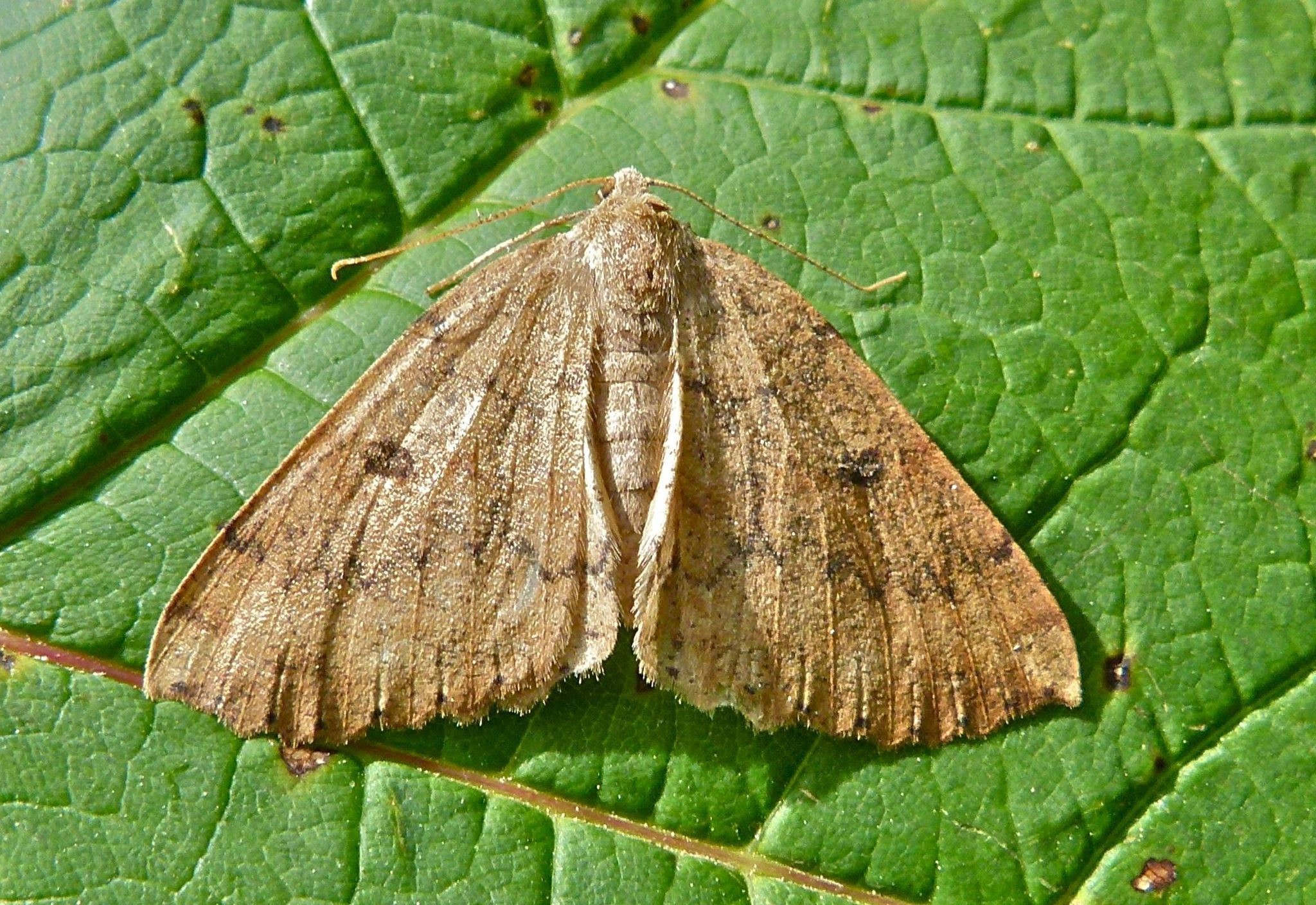
Adult
