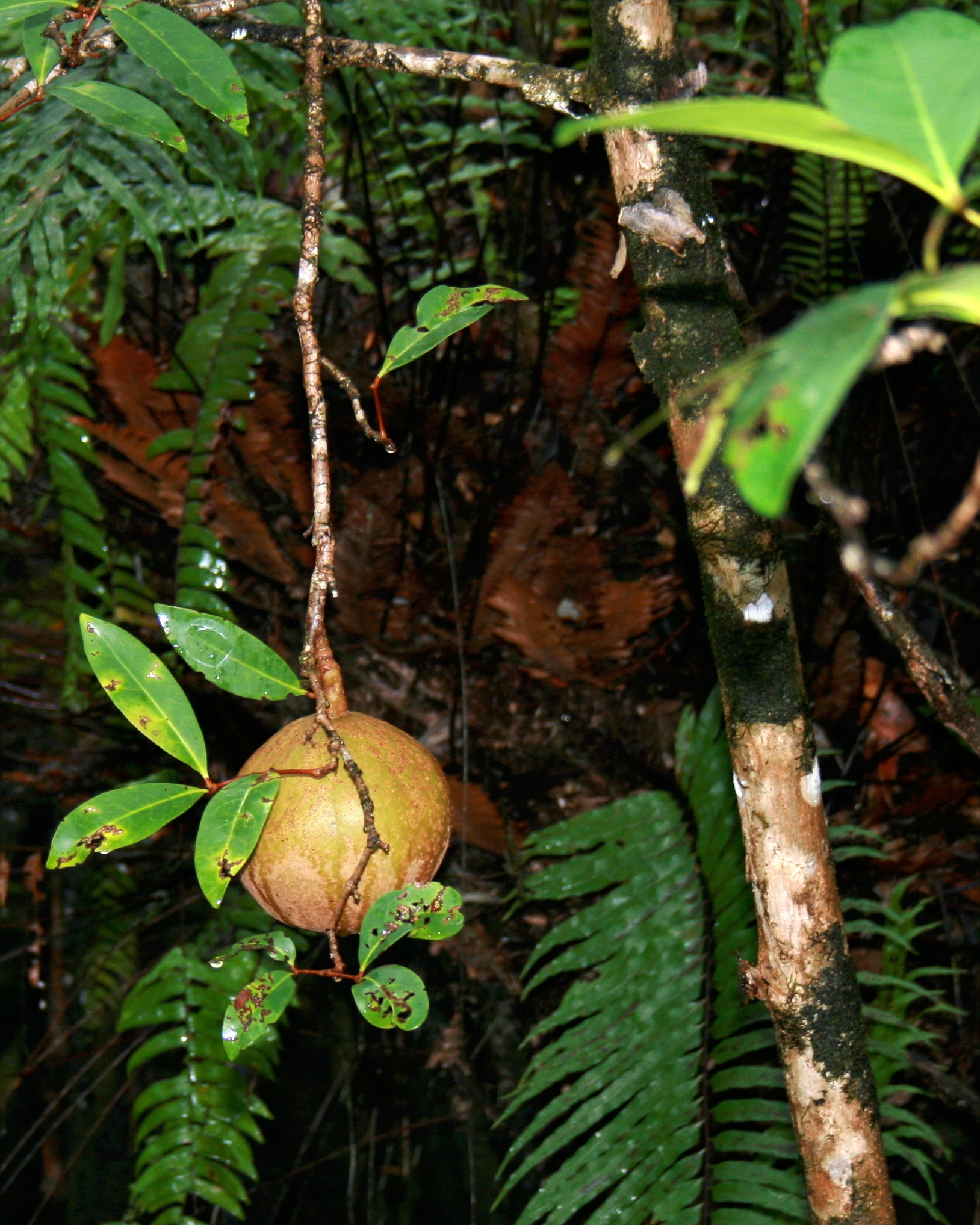

Conservation status
- Least Concern (IUCN 3.1)

Scientific classification
- Kingdom: Plantae
- Clade: Tracheophytes
- Clade: Angiosperms
- Clade: Eudicots
- Clade: Rosids
- Order: Sapindales
- Family: Meliaceae
- Genus: Xylocarpus
- Species: X. granatum

Binomial name
- Xylocarpus granatum K.D.Koenig

= Xylocarpus granatum =

Species of mangrove in the mahogany family

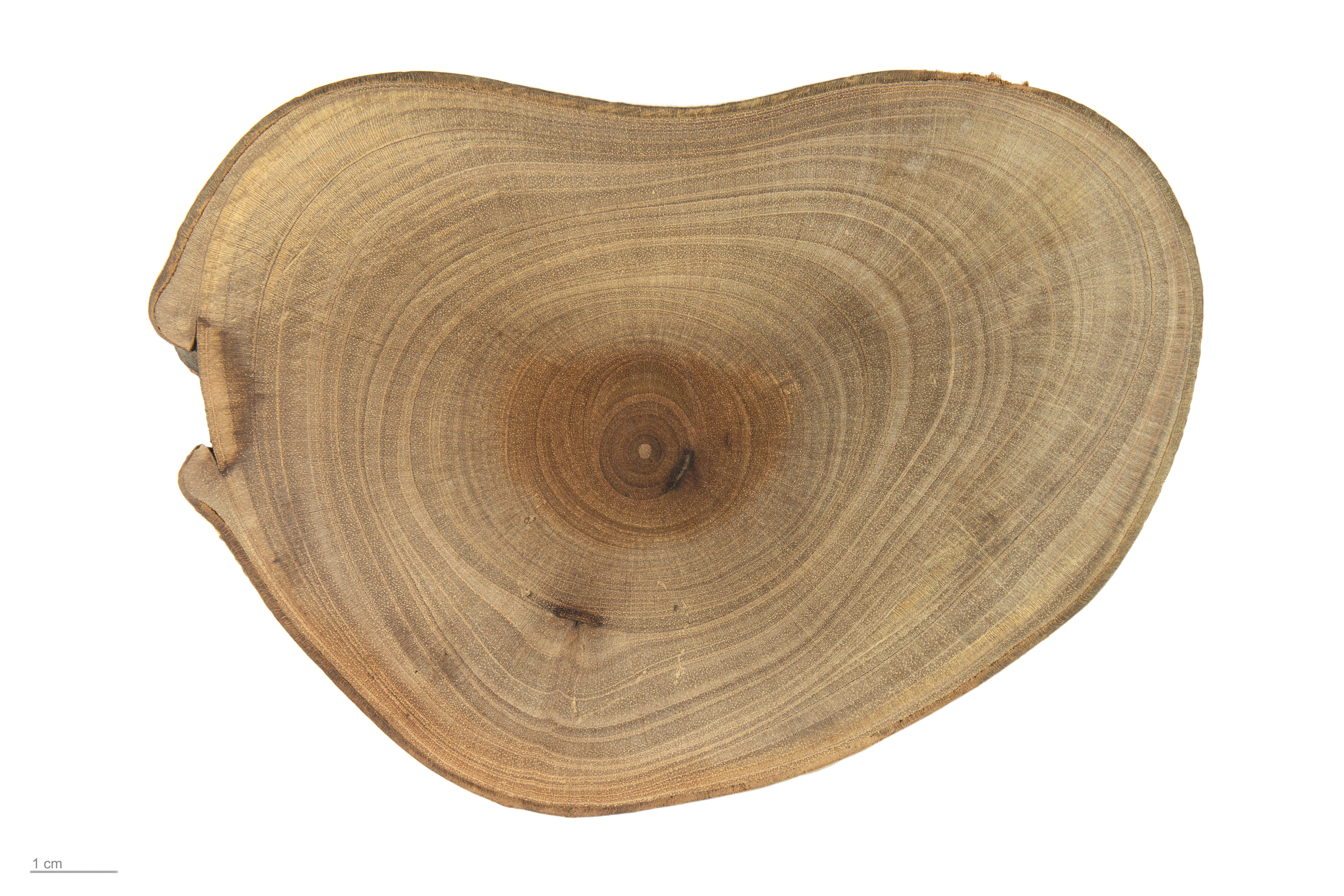
Section through trunk showing growth rings

Xylocarpus granatum, commonly known as the cannonball mangrove, cedar mangrove, or puzzlenut tree, is a species of mangrove in the mahogany family (Meliaceae). It is found in Africa, Asia, Australasia and the Pacific Islands. It is a common species of mangrove, and the International Union for Conservation of Nature has assessed its conservation status as being of "least concern".

== Description ==
Xylocarpus granatum is a small to medium-sized evergreen tree, growing to a maximum height of 12 m (39 ft). The trunk has buttresses and above-ground roots which extend for long distances to either side. The bark is brown and smooth, and comes away in flakes. The leaves are pinnate and arranged spirally on the twigs; they have two to four pairs of leaflets and are pale green when young and darken with age. The inflorescence grows in a short panicle in the axil of a leaf or at the end of the shoot. The individual flowers are 8 mm (0.3 in) wide, with parts in fours, and are white or pinkish-yellow. They are followed by large, spherical, woody capsules, 9 to 12 cm (4 to 5 in) in diameter, which split open to reveal up to a dozen seeds. The common name "puzzlenut tree" derives from the irregular shape of the seeds: a puzzle can be made of shuffling the seeds and attempting to reassemble them into the original spherical arrangement.

== Distribution and habitat ==
This species is native to the tropical and sub-tropical Western Indo-Pacific regions. Its range extends from Kenya, Tanzania and Mozambique (in which it is one of ten mangrove species) to India, Malaysia, Thailand, Indonesia, the Philippines, northern Australia and Papua New Guinea; it grows in the higher intertidal zone and is found in estuaries and lining the banks of creeks.

== Uses ==
The wood is hard and durable and can be used for boat-building, construction and making furniture, however the trees are twisted and often hollow so large pieces of timber may not be available; the wood is also used for tool handles and other small items, and can be used as firewood but burns rather quickly. The bark is rich in tannins and has been used for strengthening rope and dyeing cloth. The bark, fruits and seeds have been used in traditional medicine.

== Status ==
Mangroves in general are under threat from coastal development and from harvesting, and another threat is global warming and the consequent rise in sea levels. Xylocarpus granatum is a common species of mangrove with a very wide range, and it is probably not declining at a sufficient fast rate to be included in any threatened category. For these reasons, the International Union for Conservation of Nature has listed it as being of "least concern".
