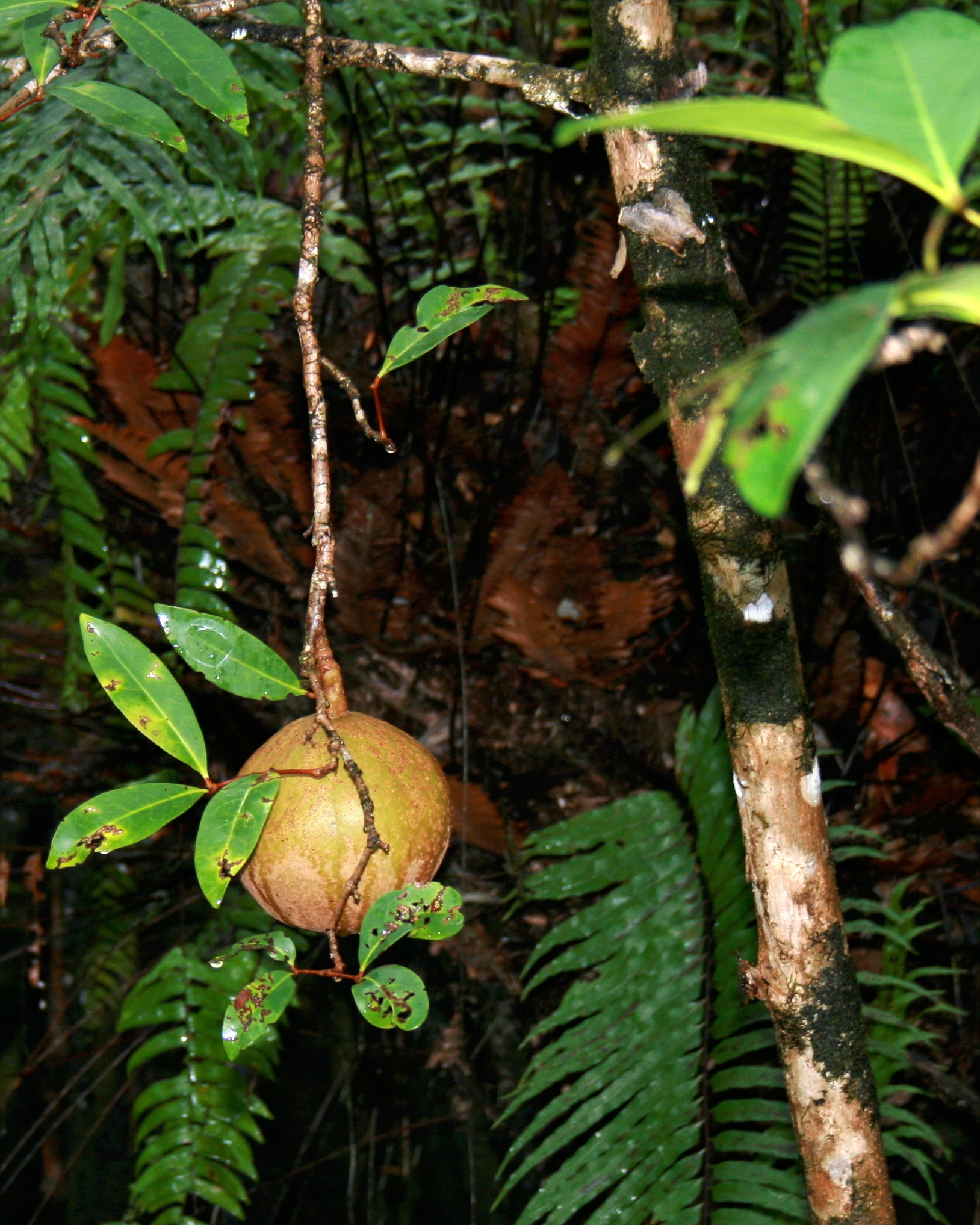
- Xylocarpus fruit in the Daintree Rainforest, Australia.

Scientific classification
- Kingdom: Plantae
- Clade: Tracheophytes
- Clade: Angiosperms
- Clade: Eudicots
- Clade: Rosids
- Order: Sapindales
- Family: Meliaceae
- Subfamily: Cedreloideae
- Genus: Xylocarpus; J.Koenig

Type species
- Xylocarpus granatum

Species
- See text
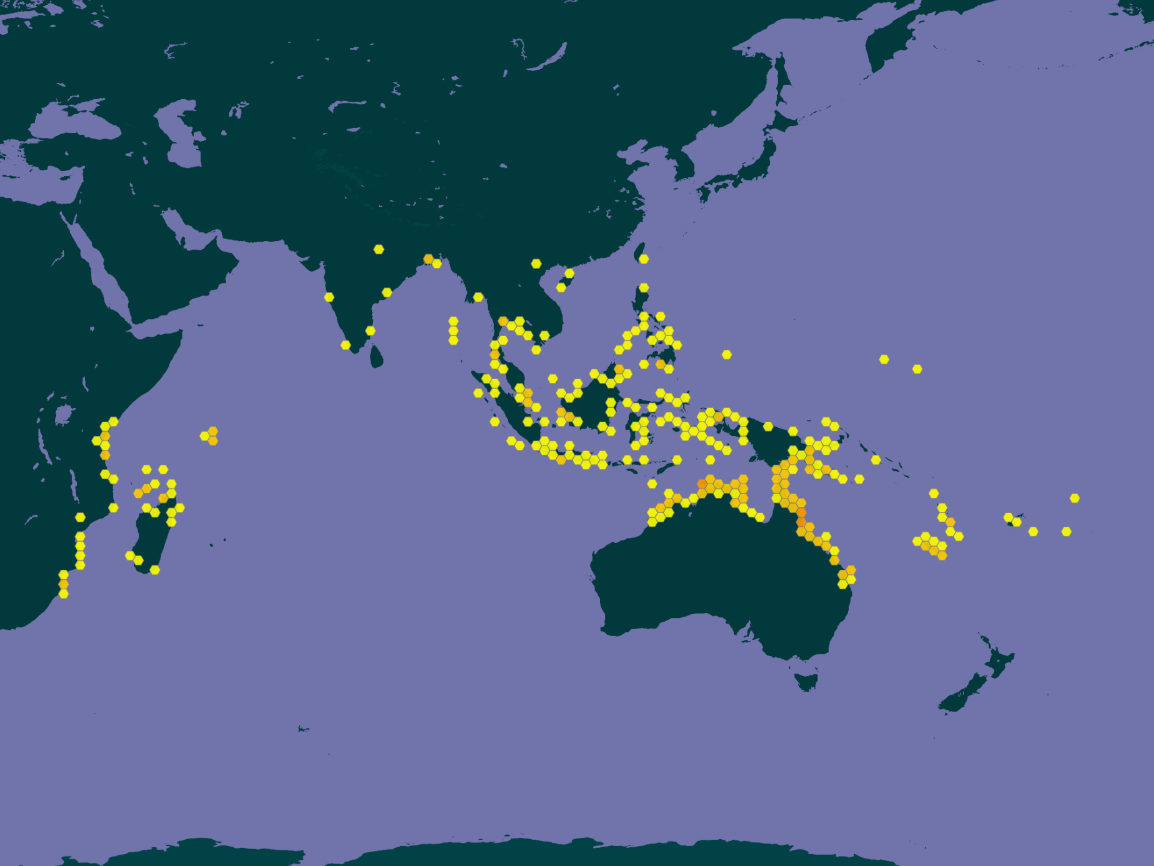
- Map of distribution of all species

= Xylocarpus =

Genus of flowering plants

Xylocarpus is a genus of plants in the mahogany family Meliaceae. It contains 3 described species, all of which are mangroves. The native range of the genus is the coasts of the Indian Ocean, Southeast Asia and the western Pacific Ocean. It is the only mangrove genus in Meliaceae.

== Description ==
Members of this genus are semi-evergreen trees that grow on coastlines. They have compound leaves with usually between 2 and 4 pairs of entire leaflets. The inflorescences are produced from the leaf axils, flowers have a 4-lobed calyx, four petals and eight stamens. The fruit are large, almost spherical capsules that contain up to 20 irregularly shaped seeds. The fruit hangs from the branch on its long peduncle before dehiscing and releasing the seeds.

== Taxonomy ==
The genus was erected by the botanist Johann Gerhard König in order to accommodate his newly-described species X. granatum. The name is derived from the Greek words xylon, meaning wood, and carpon, meaning fruit, and is a reference to the large woody fruit. The size and shape of the fruit also give rise the common name "cannonball mangrove".

== Species ==
Image	Scientific name	Distribution
	Xylocarpus granatum J.Koenig	Kenya, Tanzania and Mozambique to India, Malaysia, Thailand, Indonesia, the Philippines, northern Australia and Papua New Guinea.
	Xylocarpus moluccensis (Lam.) M.Roem.	Sundarbans of India and Bangladesh through Mainland Southeast Asia and Malesia to tropical Australia.
	Xylocarpus rumphii (Kostel.) Mabb.	Madagascar, southeast Asia, Queensland, southwestern Pacific.
