= Cleora inelegans =

Scientific classification
- Kingdom: Animalia
- Phylum: Arthropoda
- Class: Insecta
- Order: Lepidoptera
- Family: Geometridae
- Genus: Cleora
- Species: C. inelegans

Binomial name
- Cleora inelegans (Warren, 1905)

Synonyms
- Ectropis inelegans Warren 1905

Species of moth

Cleora inelegans is a moth species in the genus Cleora found in Nigeria.
