= List of moths of Christmas Island =

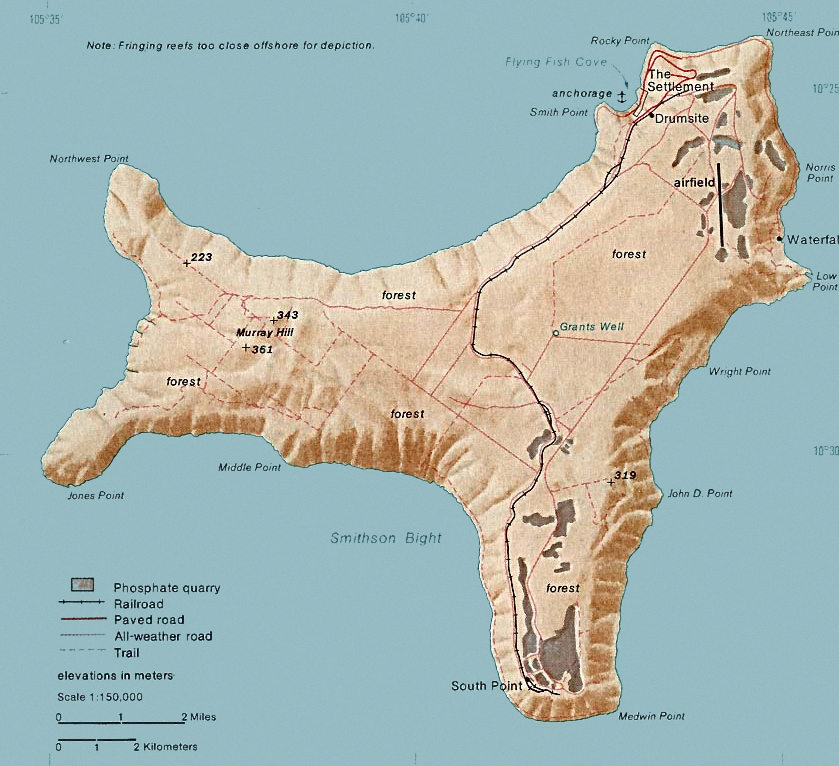
Christmas Island

This is a list of moths of Christmas Island, an Australian external territory in the Indian Ocean.

According to a recent estimate, there are 70 moth species present on Christmas Island.

Some of these species are listed below, divided into taxonomic families.

== Family Crambidae ==
- Nomophila corticalis Walker, 1869
- Parotis suralis (Lederer, 1863)
- Spoladea recurvalis (Fabricius, 1775)

== Family Erebidae ==
- Acantholipes similis Moore, 1879
- Achaea janata (Linnaeus, 1758)
- Achaea serva (Linnaeus, 1775)
- Amyna axis (Guenée, 1852)
- Amyna crocosticta Hampson, 1910
- Amyna punctum (Fabricius, 1794)
- Anomis erosa Hübner 1821
- Anomis esocampta Hampson 1926
- Anomis flava (Fabricius, 1775)
- Argina astrea (Drury, 1773)
- Bocula limbata (Butler, 1888)
- Chasmina candida (Walker, 1865)
- Dasypodia selenophora Guenée, 1852
- Dysauxes ancilla (Linnaeus, 1767)
- Erebus macrops (Linnaeus, 1768)
- Eublemma cochylioides Guenée, 1852
- Eublemma rivula Moore, 1882
- Eublemma roseana Moore, 1882
- Euchromia horsfieldi (Moore, 1859)
- Eudocima homaena (Hübner, 1816)
- Eudocima materna (Linnaeus, 1767)
- Eudocima phalonia (Linnaeus, 1763)
- Eudocima salaminia (Cramer, 1777)
- Euproctis pulverea (Hampson, 1900)
- Deltote griseomixta (Hampson, 1900)
- Hydrillodes vexillifera Hampson, 1900
- Hypena indicatalis Walker, 1859
- Hypena strigatus (Fabricius, 1798)
- Lithacodia griseomixta (Hampson 1900)
- Lyclene distributa Walker, 1862
- Maliattha signifera (Walker, [1858])
- Mocis frugalis (Fabricius, 1775)
- Olene inclusa (Walker, 1856)
- Orgyia postica (Walker, 1855)
- Pantydia metaspila (Walker, 1857)
- Simplicia butesalis (Walker, 1858)
- Thyas coronata (Fabricius, 1775)
- Thyas honesta Hübner, 1824
- Trigonodes hyppasia (Cramer, 1779)
- Utetheisa lotrix (Cramer, [1777])
- Utetheisa pulchelloides Hampson, 1907

== Family Euteliidae ==
- Targalla delatrix (Guenée, 1852)

== Family Geometridae ==
- Anisodes hypomion Prout, 1933
- Cleora acaciaria (Boisduval, 1833)
- Cleora alienaria fumipennis Prout, 1929
- Comostolopsis regina Thierry Mieg, 1915
- Ecliptopera phaula Prout, 1933
- Ectropis scotozonea (Hampson, 1900)
- Hemithea hyperymna Prout, 1933
- Hyperythra lutea Stoll, 1781
- Orsonoba clelia (Cramer, 1782)
- Paradarisa comparataria (Walker, 1866)
- Sauris hirudinata Guenée, 1858
- Sauris pelagitis Prout, 1933
- Sauris remodesaria Walker, 1862
- Scopula actuaria (Walker, 1861)
- Scopula optivata (Walker, 1861)
- Scopula tumiditibia Prout, 1920
- Syrrhodia vindex Prout, 1933
- Thalassodes suviridis Warren 1905
- Thalassodes veraria Guenée, 1857

== Family Hyblaeidae ==
- Hyblaea apricans (Boisduval, 1833)

== Family Noctuidae ==
- Aegilia describens Walker, 1857
- Brana calopasa Walker, [1858]
- Condica capensis (Guenée, 1852)
- Dypterygia vagivitta (Walker, 1862)
- Helicoverpa assulta (Guenée, 1852)
- Iambia transversa (Moore, 1882)
- Mimeusemia econia Hampson, 1900
- Oxyodes scrobiculata (Fabricius, 1775)
- Spodoptera litura (Fabricius, 1775)
- Spodoptera littoralis (Boisduval, 1833)
- Spodoptera mauritia (Boisduval, 1833)
- Spodoptera picta (Guérin-Méneville, [1838])
- Thysanoplusia orichalcea (Fabricius, 1775)

== Family Nolidae ==
- Armactica andrewsi Hampson
- Earias cupreoviridis (Walker, 1862)
- Earias latimargo Hampson, 1912
- Earias luteolaria Hampson, 1891
- Lyclene distributa Walker, 1862

== Family Pyralidae ==
- Ancylosis singhalella (Ragonot, 1889)
- Corcyra cephalonica (Stainton, 1866)
- Endotricha puncticostalis (Walker, [1866])
- Ephestia scotella Hampson, 1900
- Epicrocis oegnusalis (Walker, 1859)
- Euzophera cinerosella (Zeller, 1839)
- Doloessa ochrociliella Ragonot, 1893
- Homoeosoma nimbella (Duponchel, 1837)

== Family Sphingidae ==
- Agrius convolvuli (Linné, 1758)
- Cephonodes hylas (Linnaeus, [1771])
- Daphnis placida (Walker, 1856)
- Gnathothlibus erotus (Cramer, 1777)
- Hippotion velox (Fabricius, 1793)
- Psilogramma discistriga (Walker, 1856)
- Theretra latreillii (MacLeay, 1826)

== Family Tortricidae ==
- Adoxophyes liberatrix (Diakonoff, 1947)

== Family Uraniidae ==
- Epiplema inhians Warren, 1896

== See also ==
- Lists of Lepidoptera by region
