= Maliattha subblandula =

Scientific classification
- Kingdom: Animalia
- Phylum: Arthropoda
- Clade: Pancrustacea
- Class: Insecta
- Order: Lepidoptera
- Superfamily: Noctuoidea
- Family: Noctuidae
- Genus: Maliattha
- Species: M. subblandula

Binomial name
- Maliattha subblandula Hacker, 2016

Species of moth in Africa

Maliattha subblandula is a moth in the family Noctuidae

Described in 2016 by Hermann Hacker. It is found in Africa.
