= Iambia thwaitesii =

Scientific classification
- Domain: Eukaryota
- Kingdom: Animalia
- Phylum: Arthropoda
- Class: Insecta
- Order: Lepidoptera
- Superfamily: Noctuoidea
- Family: Noctuidae
- Genus: Iambia
- Species: I. thwaitesii

Binomial name
- Iambia thwaitesii (Moore, 1885)

Synonyms
- Methorasa thwaitesii Moore, 1885; Iambia thuaitesi Hampson, 1908

Species of moth

Iambia thwaitesii is a moth of the family Noctuidae first described by Frederic Moore in 1885.

== Distribution ==
It is found in India, Sri Lanka, Kenya and Nigeria.

== Description ==
Its wingspan is about 30 mm. The body is pale brown, but the head and thorax are marked with black. Palpi with a very short third joint. The male lacks tufts of hair on the claspers. Male without a cleft corneous ridge on vertex of head. Antennae minutely ciliated in male. Forewings with pale brown, irrorated (sprinkled) and blotched with black. The sub-basal line is obscured by black blotches. Antemedial and postmedial double lines reduced to series of striae. Postmedial lines are suffused with diffused black inside it. Reniform is black and ill-defined. There is a broad sub-marginal waved black band form costa to vein 4. A marginal series of prominent black spots. Hindwing dark fuscous. Ventral side of hindwing with cell-spot and postmedial line. Some specimens have more variegated chestnut and dark brown forewings. Orbicular and reniform fuscous. The apical part of the submarginal band forming a prominent black patch.
