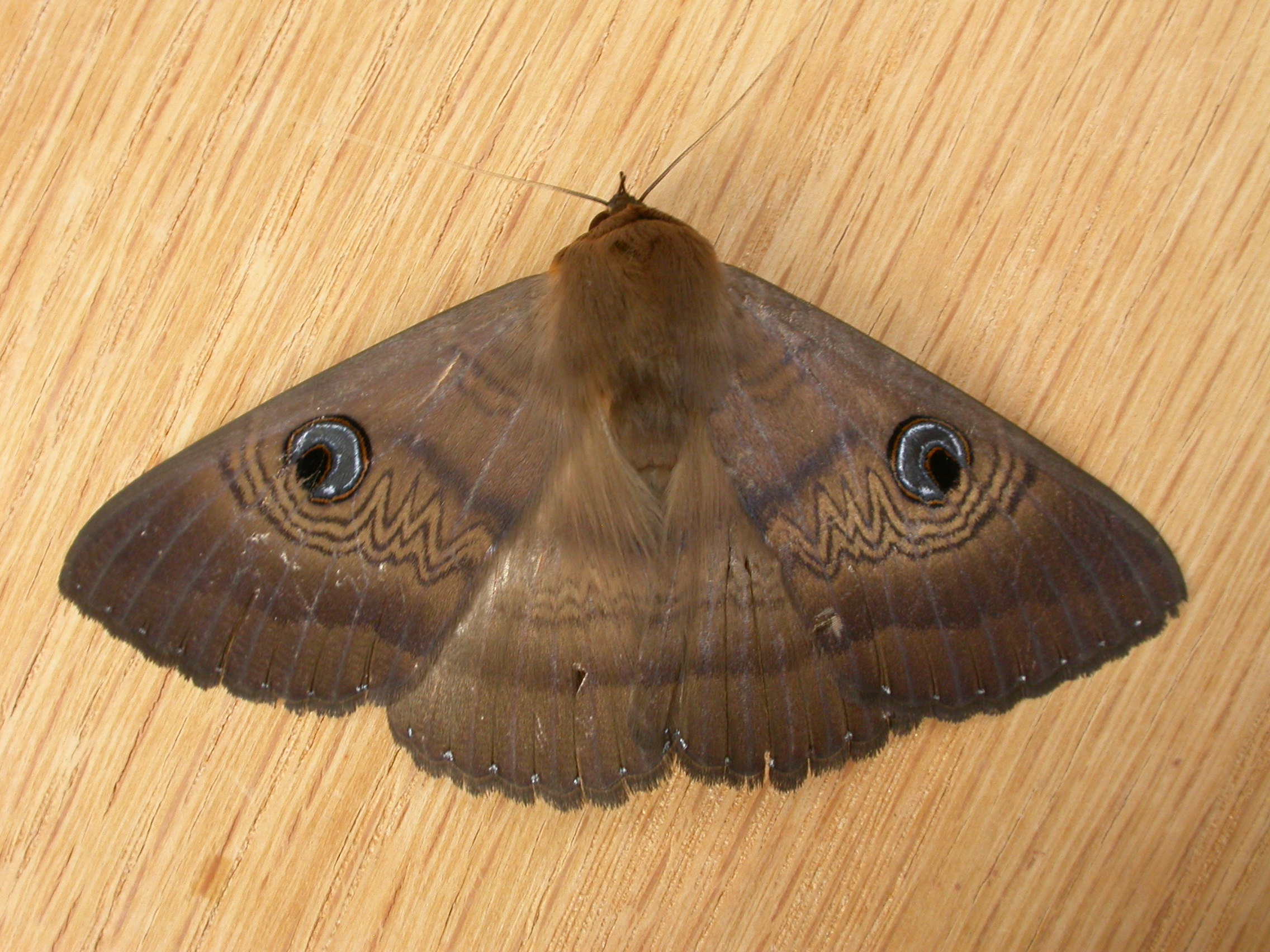
- Dasypodia selenophora

Scientific classification
- Kingdom: Animalia
- Phylum: Arthropoda
- Class: Insecta
- Order: Lepidoptera
- Superfamily: Noctuoidea
- Family: Erebidae
- Subfamily: Erebinae
- Genus: Dasypodia; Guenée in Boisduval & Guenée, 1852

= Dasypodia =

Genus of moths

Dasypodia is a genus of moths of the family Erebidae. The genus was erected by Achille Guenée in 1852.

== Species ==
- Dasypodia cymatodes Guenée, 1852 – northern old lady moth
- Dasypodia selenophora Guenée, 1852 – southern old lady moth
