= Maliattha blandula =

Scientific classification
- Domain: Eukaryota
- Kingdom: Animalia
- Phylum: Arthropoda
- Class: Insecta
- Order: Lepidoptera
- Superfamily: Noctuoidea
- Family: Noctuidae
- Genus: Maliattha
- Species: M. blandula

Binomial name
- Maliattha blandula (Guenée, 1862)

Synonyms
- Erastria blandula Guenée, 1862; Anthophila i-graecum Mabille, 1881; Lithacodia blandula (Guenée, 1862); Lithacodia i-graecum; Tarache perta Schaus, 1893; Lithacodia perta

Species of moth

Maliattha blandula is a species of moth in the family Noctuidae first described by Achille Guenée in 1862. It is found in Tanzania, Madagascar, Mauritius, Réunion and the Comoros. It was placed in the genus Maliattha in 2016.
