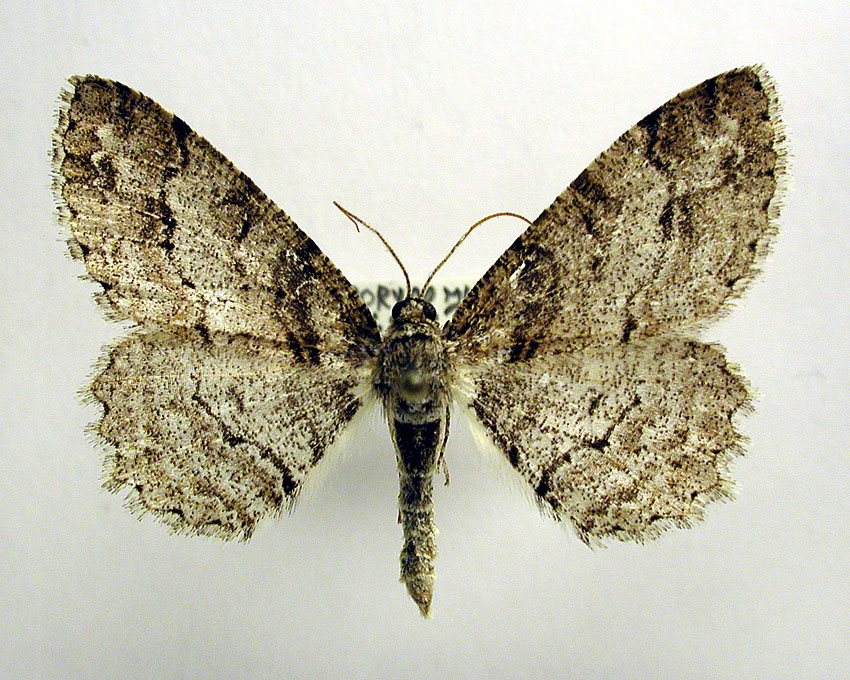

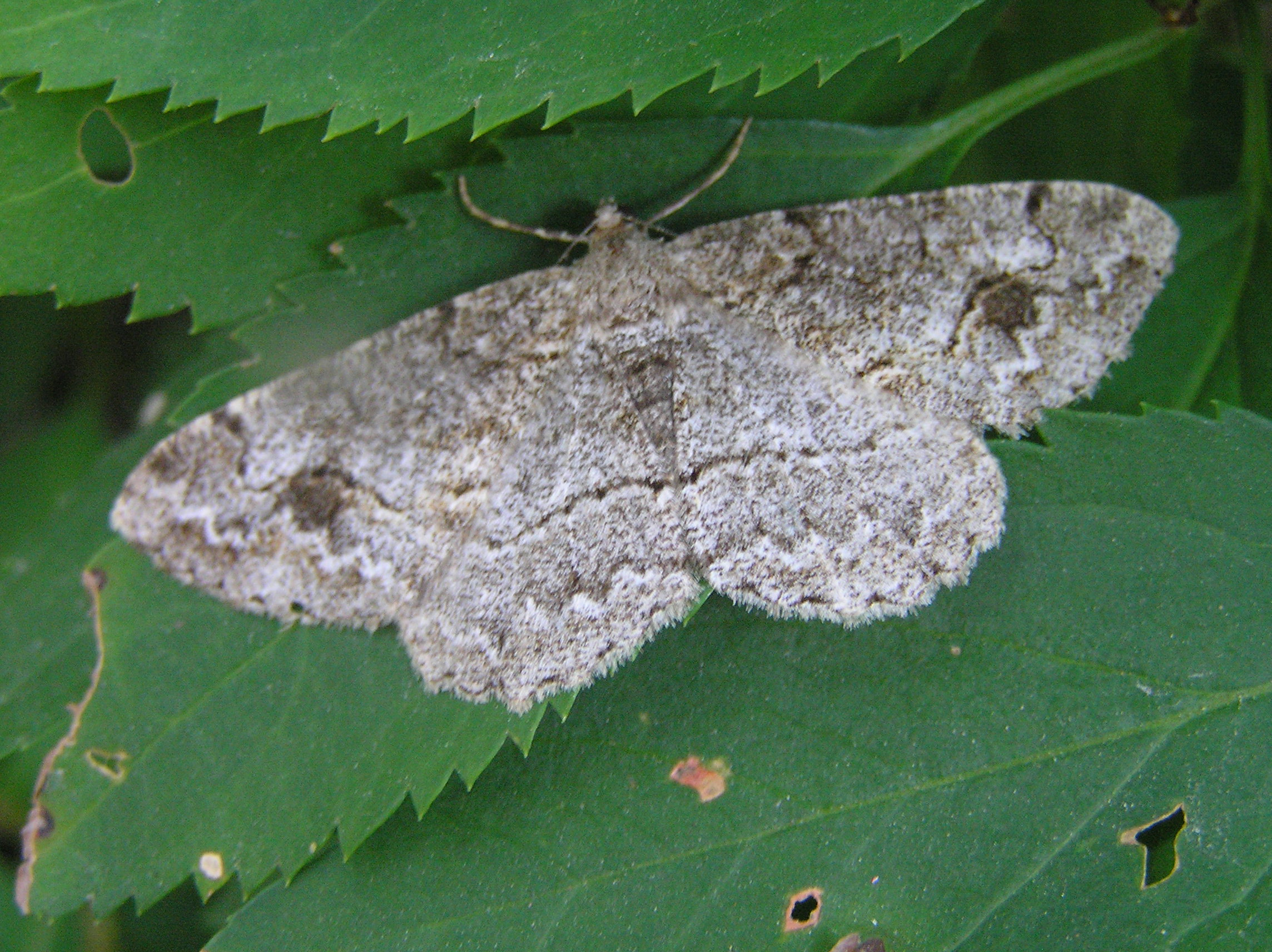

Scientific classification
- Kingdom: Animalia
- Phylum: Arthropoda
- Class: Insecta
- Order: Lepidoptera
- Family: Geometridae
- Genus: Paradarisa
- Species: P. consonaria

Binomial name
- Paradarisa consonaria (Hübner, 1799)

Synonyms
- Geometra consonaria Hubner, 1799; Paradarisa (Ectropis) consonaria; Boarmia tetragonaria

= Paradarisa consonaria =

Species of moth

Paradarisa consonaria, the brindled square spot or square spot, is a moth of the family Geometridae. It is found in north and central Europe and east to south-eastern Siberia and Japan.

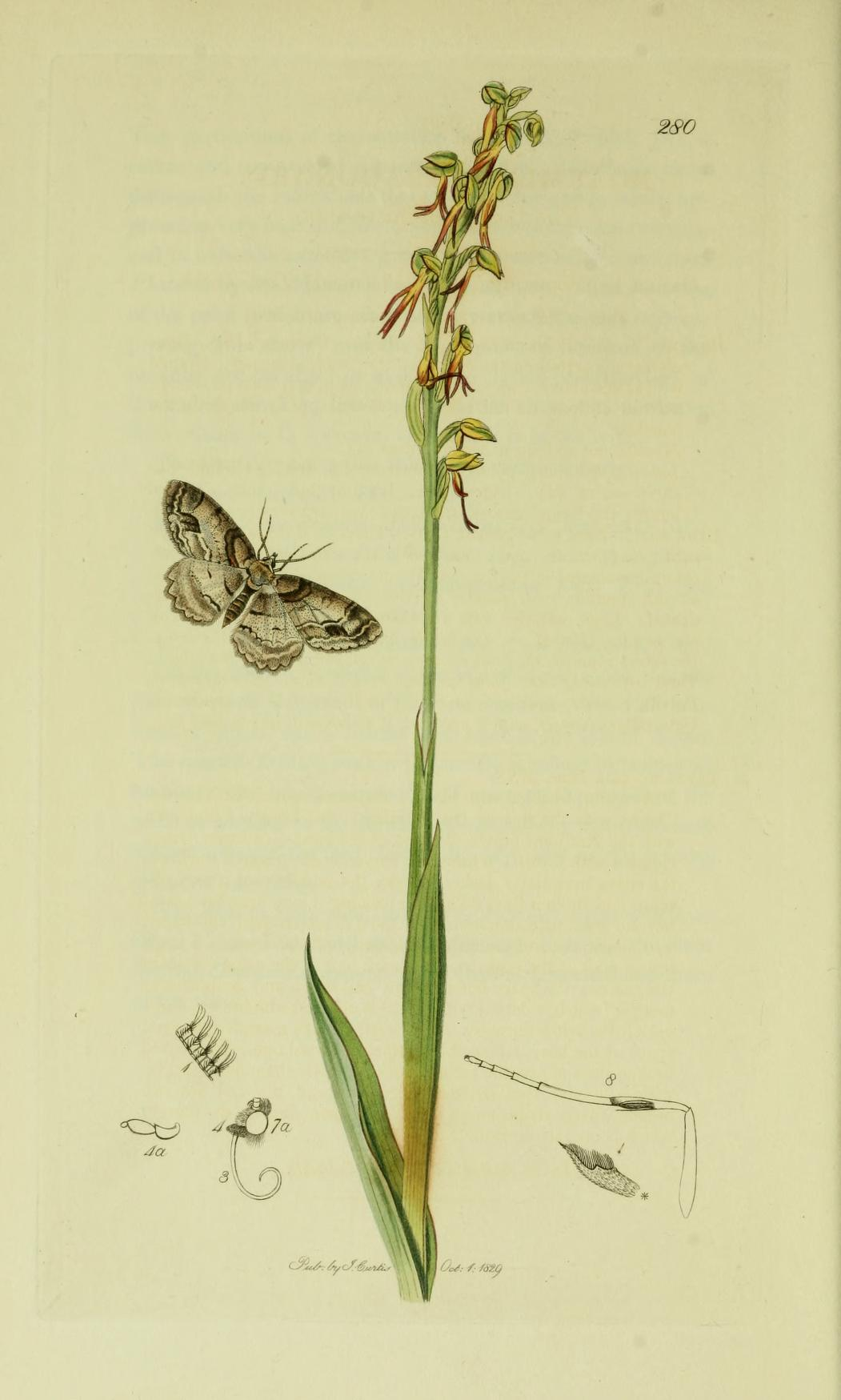
Illustration from John Curtis's British Entomology Volume 6

It is a variable species and has a tendency to melanism. Well-marked individuals have a dark square spot on the forewing. It differs from the crepuscularia group in its tone of colour as well as in the shape and position of the postmedian line. The female is much more whitish than the male and shows a stronger, darker quadrate spot between the postmedian and subterminal lines of the forewing. Abnormal form nigra Bankes is unicolorous blackish except a very small patch of white distally to the cell.

The wingspan is 40–45 mm. Adults are on wing from April to June.

The eggs are longitudinally ribbed, and yellow, marked with orange red. Larva elongate, transversely wrinkled, with two minute warts on the 8th abdominal segment: yellowish brown clouded with grey and with reddish. The larvae feed on various deciduous and coniferous trees. On birch, beech, oak, etc. The pupa hibernates.
