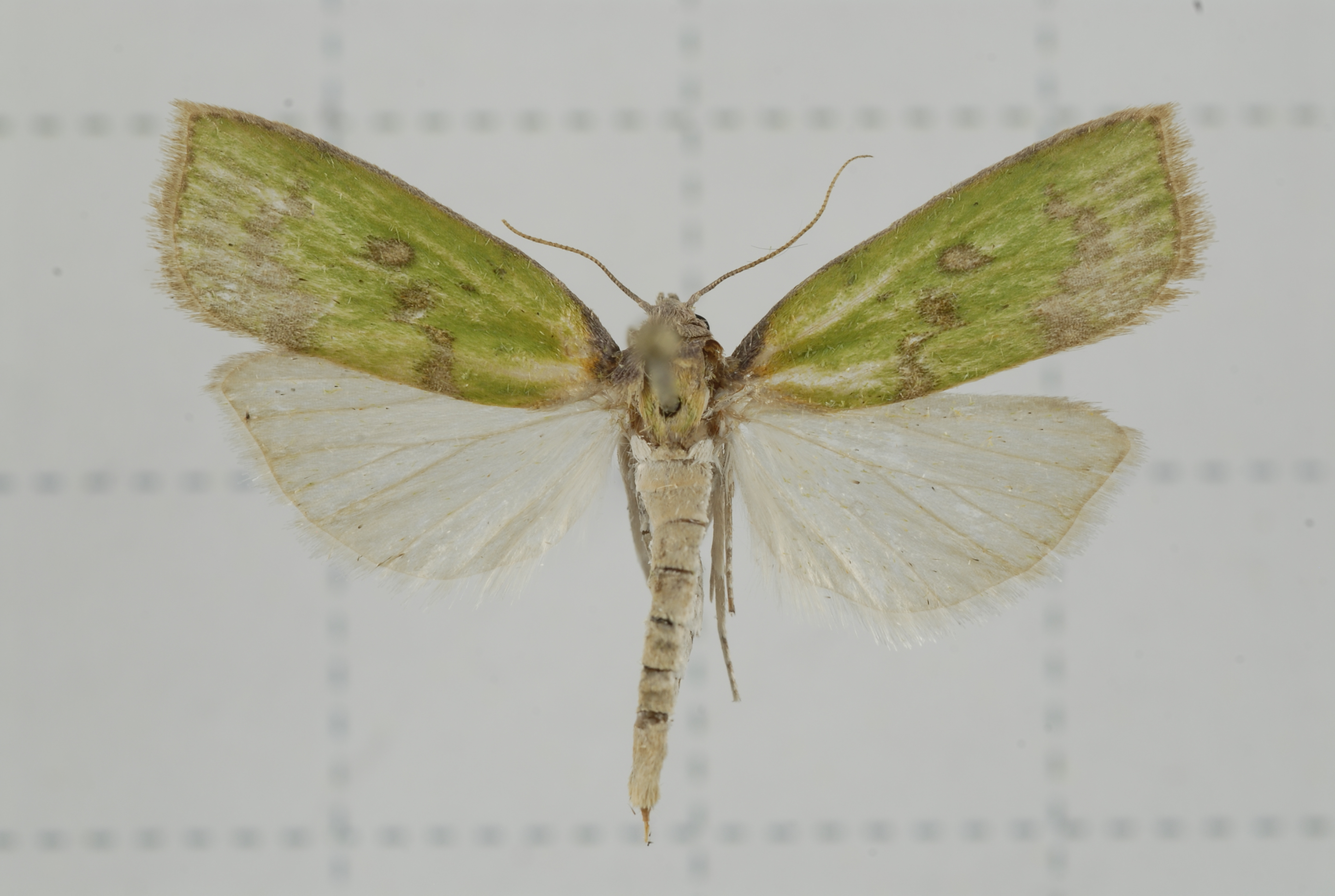

Scientific classification
- Kingdom: Animalia
- Phylum: Arthropoda
- Clade: Pancrustacea
- Class: Insecta
- Order: Lepidoptera
- Family: Pyralidae
- Genus: Doloessa
- Species: D. viridis

Binomial name
- Doloessa viridis Zeller, 1848

Synonyms
- Thagora figurana Walker, 1863; Tyana ornata Wileman, 1910; Prasinoxena phthorogramma Meyrick, 1938

= Doloessa viridis =

Species of moth

Doloessa viridis is a species of snout moth (family Pyralidae) in the genus Doloessa. It was described by Philipp Christoph Zeller in 1848 and is known from Indonesia, Malaysia, Sri Lanka, China, Australia (Queensland), Taiwan, the Philippines and the Solomons.

== Description ==
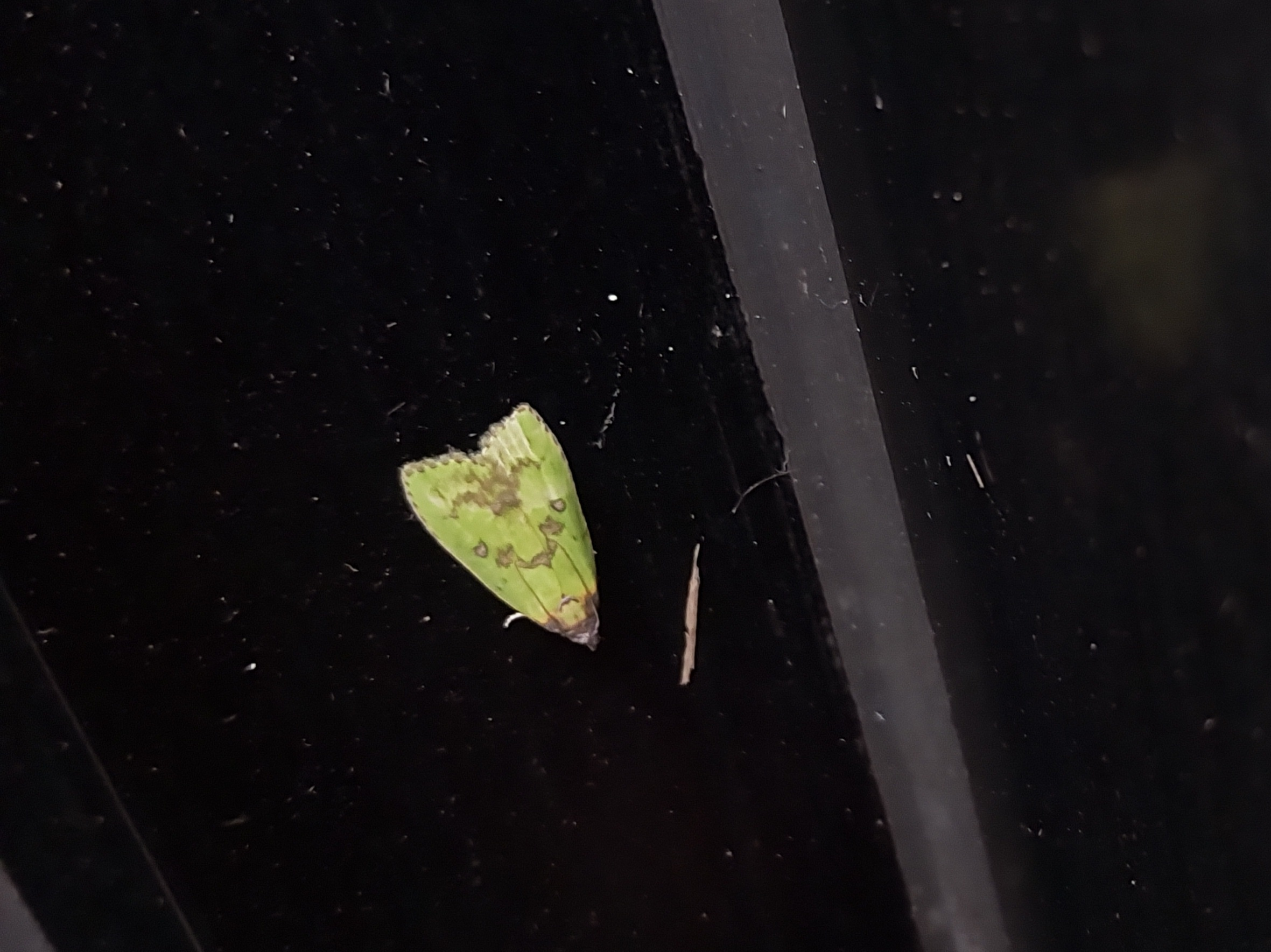
Doloessa viridis

The wingspan is about 20–24 mm. The male has a pale brownish head and thorax. Abdomen whitish. Forewings emerald green, the base and costa brown. There is an antemedial brown speck found below the costa and another in the cell. An oblique brown patches series from discocellulars to inner margin. Postmedial and submarginal minutely dentate brown bands from vein 6 to inner margin, where the former excurved between veins 5 and 2. Cilia brownish. Hindwings whitish with brown margin.

The larvae feed on Khaya ivorensis, Aglaia wallichii and Cocos nucifera as well as the seeds of Shorea, rice, Sorghum and maize.
