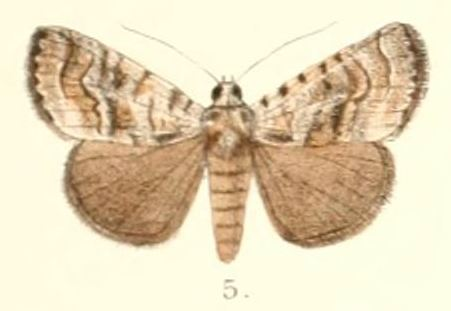
- Iambia transversa

Scientific classification
- Kingdom: Animalia
- Phylum: Arthropoda
- Class: Insecta
- Order: Lepidoptera
- Superfamily: Noctuoidea
- Family: Noctuidae
- Subfamily: Amphipyrinae
- Genus: Iambia; Walker, 1863

Type species
- Iambia inferalis Walker, 1863

Synonyms
- Jambia Gaede, 1934

= Iambia =

Genus of moths

Iambia is a genus of moths of the family Noctuidae. The genus was erected by Francis Walker in 1863.

== Species ==
- Iambia alticola (Laporte, 1973)
- Iambia anormalis (Hampson, 1907)
- Iambia berioi Hacker & Fibiger, 2006
- Iambia brunnea Warren, 1914
- Iambia harmonica (Hampson, 1902)
- Iambia incerta (Rothschild, 1913)
- Iambia inferalis Walker, 1863
- Iambia jansei Berio, 1966
- Iambia japonica Sugi, 1958
- Iambia lyricalis Holloway, 1989
- Iambia melanochlora (Hampson, 1902)
- Iambia nigella Hampson, 1918
- Iambia nocturna (Hampson, 1902)
- Iambia nyctostola (Hampson, 1918)
- Iambia postpallida (Wiltshire, 1977)
- Iambia pulla (Swinhoe, 1885)
- Iambia rufescens (Hampson, 1894)
- Iambia shanica Berio, 1973
- Iambia tessellata (Prout, 1925)
- Iambia thwaitesii (Moore, [1884])
- Iambia transversa (Moore, 1882)
- Iambia unduligera (Butler, 1889)
- Iambia volasira Viette, 1968
