= Maliattha melanesiensis =

Scientific classification
- Domain: Eukaryota
- Kingdom: Animalia
- Phylum: Arthropoda
- Class: Insecta
- Order: Lepidoptera
- Superfamily: Noctuoidea
- Family: Noctuidae
- Genus: Maliattha
- Species: M. melanesiensis

Binomial name
- Maliattha melanesiensis Robinson, 1975

Species of moth

Maliattha melanesiensis is a moth of the family Noctuidae. It was described by Robinson in 1975. It is found on Fiji.
