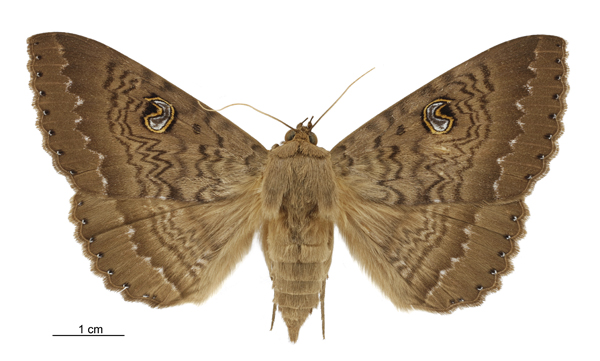
- Female specimen
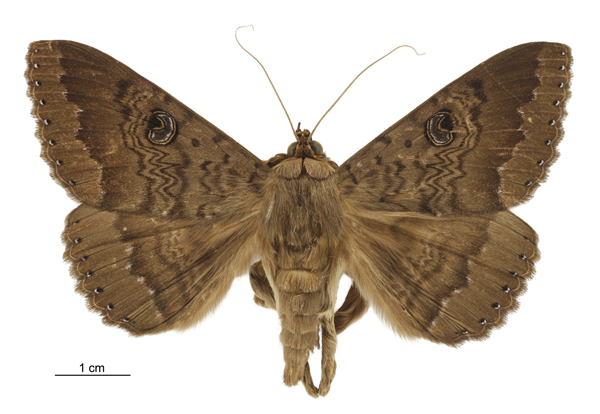
- Male specimen

Scientific classification
- Kingdom: Animalia
- Phylum: Arthropoda
- Class: Insecta
- Order: Lepidoptera
- Superfamily: Noctuoidea
- Family: Erebidae
- Genus: Dasypodia
- Species: D. cymatodes

Binomial name
- Dasypodia cymatodes Guenée, 1852

= Dasypodia cymatodes =

Species of moth

Dasypodia cymatodes, the northern old lady moth or northern wattle moth, is a moth of the family Noctuidae. The species was first described by Achille Guenée in 1852. It is found in Australia (Queensland, New South Wales and Victoria), and is self introduced in New Zealand.

The wingspan is about 80 mm.

The larvae feed on Acacia species.
