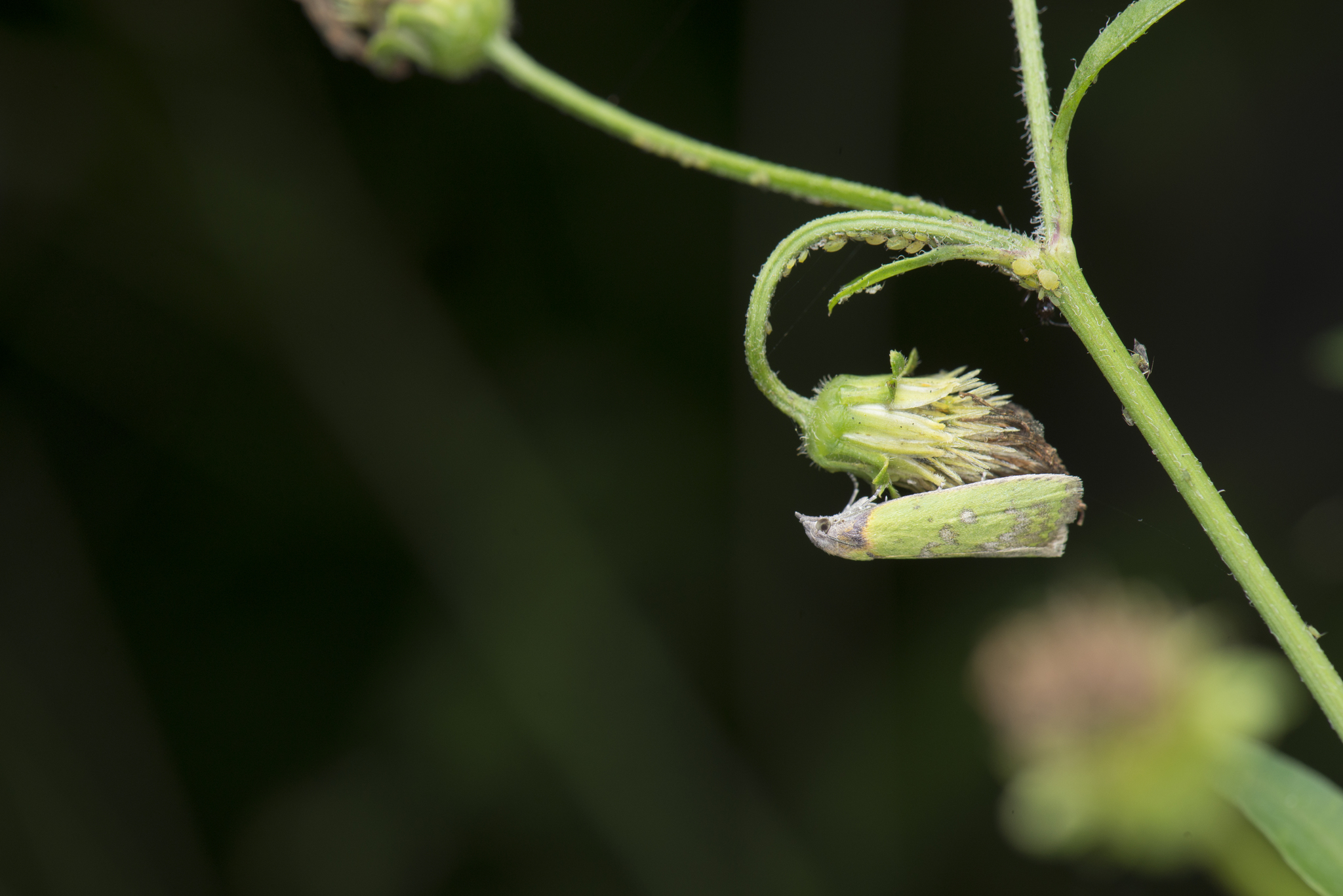
- Doloessa viridis

Scientific classification
- Kingdom: Animalia
- Phylum: Arthropoda
- Clade: Pancrustacea
- Class: Insecta
- Order: Lepidoptera
- Family: Pyralidae
- Tribe: Tirathabini
- Genus: Doloessa; Zeller, 1848

Synonyms
- Carcinoptera Ragonot, 1893; Thagora Walker, 1863

= Doloessa =

Genus of moths

Doloessa is a genus of snout moths (family Pyralidae). It was described by Philipp Christoph Zeller in 1848 and is known from India, Australia, New Guinea, Japan, Sri Lanka, Indonesia, and China.

== Description ==
Veins 8 and 9 given off at intervals from vein 7. Male with a fascia of black scales on the ventral side of the forewings in and beyond the cell, and a similar subcostal fascia on the dorsal side of the hindwings.

== Species ==
- Doloessa constellata Hampson, 1898
- Doloessa hilaropis (Meyrick, 1897
- Doloessa ochrociliella (Ragonot, 1893)
- Doloessa viridis Zeller, 1848
