= Maliattha renalis =

Scientific classification
- Domain: Eukaryota
- Kingdom: Animalia
- Phylum: Arthropoda
- Class: Insecta
- Order: Lepidoptera
- Superfamily: Noctuoidea
- Family: Noctuidae
- Genus: Maliattha
- Species: M. renalis

Binomial name
- Maliattha renalis Moore, 1882

Species of moth

Maliattha renalis is a moth of the family Noctuidae.
