= Maliattha lativitta =

Scientific classification
- Domain: Eukaryota
- Kingdom: Animalia
- Phylum: Arthropoda
- Class: Insecta
- Order: Lepidoptera
- Superfamily: Noctuoidea
- Family: Noctuidae
- Genus: Maliattha
- Species: M. lativitta

Binomial name
- Maliattha lativitta (Moore, 1881)

Synonyms
- Bankia lativitta Moore, 1881

Species of moth

Maliattha lativitta is a moth of the family Noctuidae first described by Frederic Moore in 1881. It is found in Sri Lanka and India.
