= Maliattha fervens =

Scientific classification
- Kingdom: Animalia
- Phylum: Arthropoda
- Class: Insecta
- Order: Lepidoptera
- Superfamily: Noctuoidea
- Family: Noctuidae
- Genus: Maliattha
- Species: M. fervens

Binomial name
- Maliattha fervens (Hampson, 1906)

Synonyms
- Hyela fervens Hampson, 1906; Clystea fervens

Species of moth

Maliattha fervens is a moth of the family Noctuidae. It was described by George Hampson in 1906. It is found in Karnataka, India.
