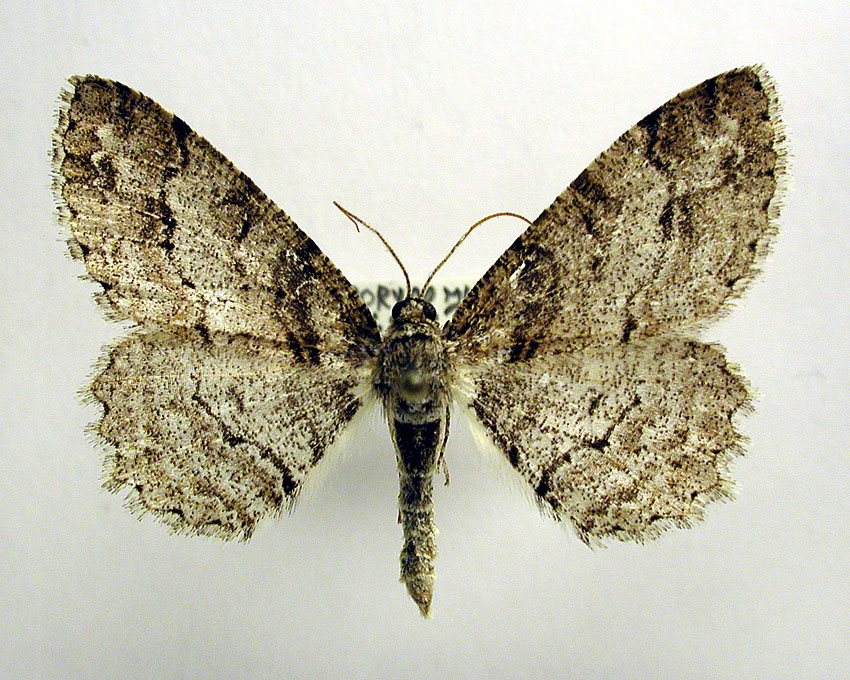
- Paradarisa consonaria

Scientific classification
- Kingdom: Animalia
- Phylum: Arthropoda
- Class: Insecta
- Order: Lepidoptera
- Family: Geometridae
- Tribe: Boarmiini
- Genus: Paradarisa; Warren, 1894

= Paradarisa =

Genus of moths

Paradarisa is a genus of moths in the family Geometridae described by Warren in 1894.

== Species ==
- Paradarisa consonaria (Hübner, 1799) – square spot
- Paradarisa comparataria (Walker, 1866)
