= Doloessa constellata =

Scientific classification
- Kingdom: Animalia
- Phylum: Arthropoda
- Class: Insecta
- Order: Lepidoptera
- Family: Pyralidae
- Genus: Doloessa
- Species: D. constellata

Binomial name
- Doloessa constellata Hampson, 1898

Species of moth

Doloessa constellata is a species of snout moth in the genus Doloessa. It was described by George Hampson in 1898 and is known from Assam, India.
