= Doloessa hilaropis =

Scientific classification
- Kingdom: Animalia
- Phylum: Arthropoda
- Class: Insecta
- Order: Lepidoptera
- Family: Pyralidae
- Genus: Doloessa
- Species: D. hilaropis

Binomial name
- Doloessa hilaropis (Meyrick, 1897)

Synonyms
- Melissoblaptes hilaropis Meyrick, 1897; Philenora ypsilon Rothschild, 1916

Species of moth

Doloessa hilaropis is a species of snout moth in the genus Doloessa. It was described by Edward Meyrick in 1897, and is known from New Guinea and Queensland in Australia.
