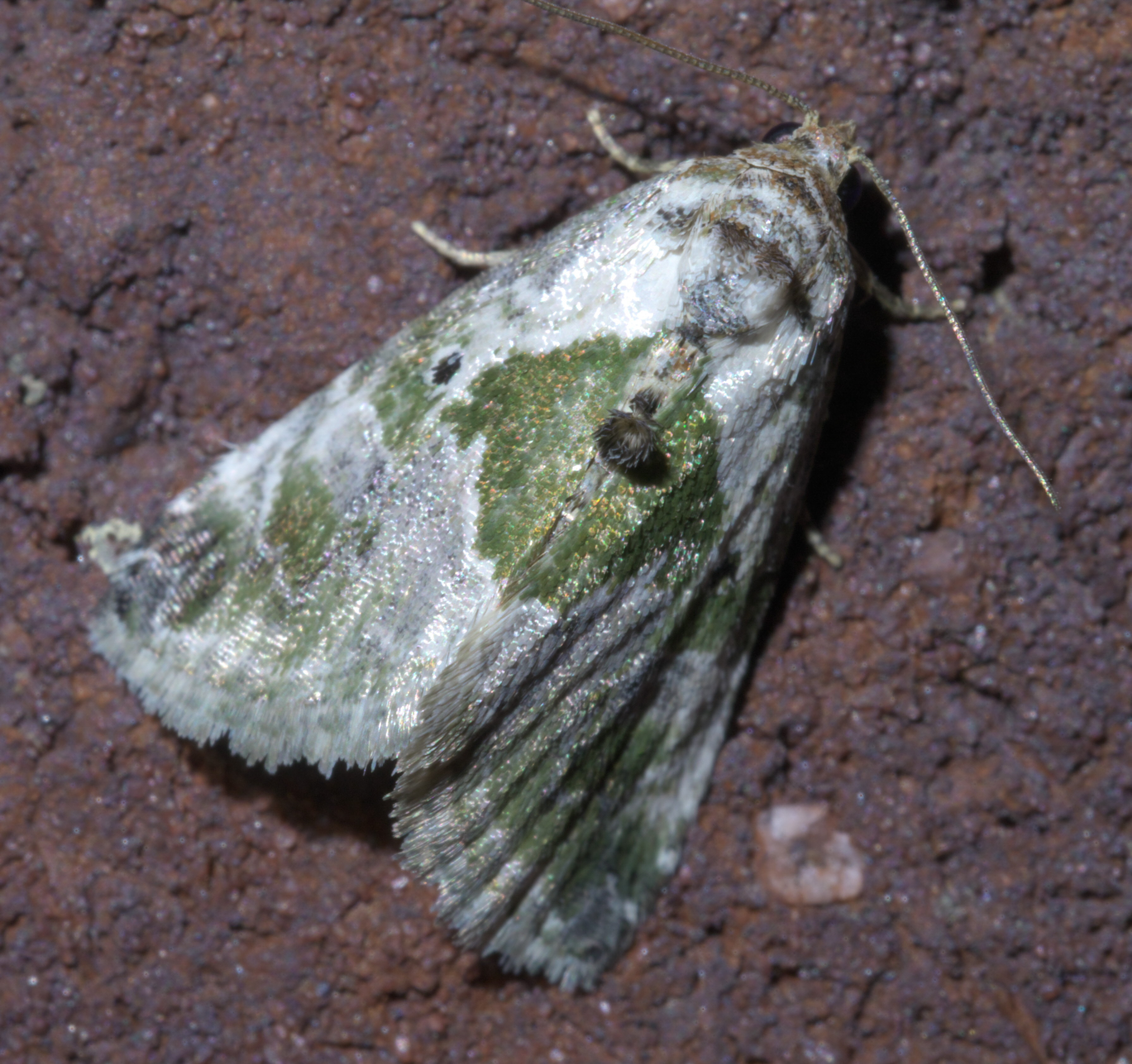

Scientific classification
- Kingdom: Animalia
- Phylum: Arthropoda
- Clade: Pancrustacea
- Class: Insecta
- Order: Lepidoptera
- Superfamily: Noctuoidea
- Family: Noctuidae
- Genus: Maliattha
- Species: M. synochitis

Binomial name
- Maliattha synochitis (Grote & Robinson, 1868)

= Maliattha synochitis =

Species of moth

Maliattha synochitis, the black-dotted maliattha or black-dotted lithacodia, is a species of owlet moth in the family Noctuidae. The species was first described by Augustus Radcliffe Grote and Coleman Townsend Robinson in 1868.

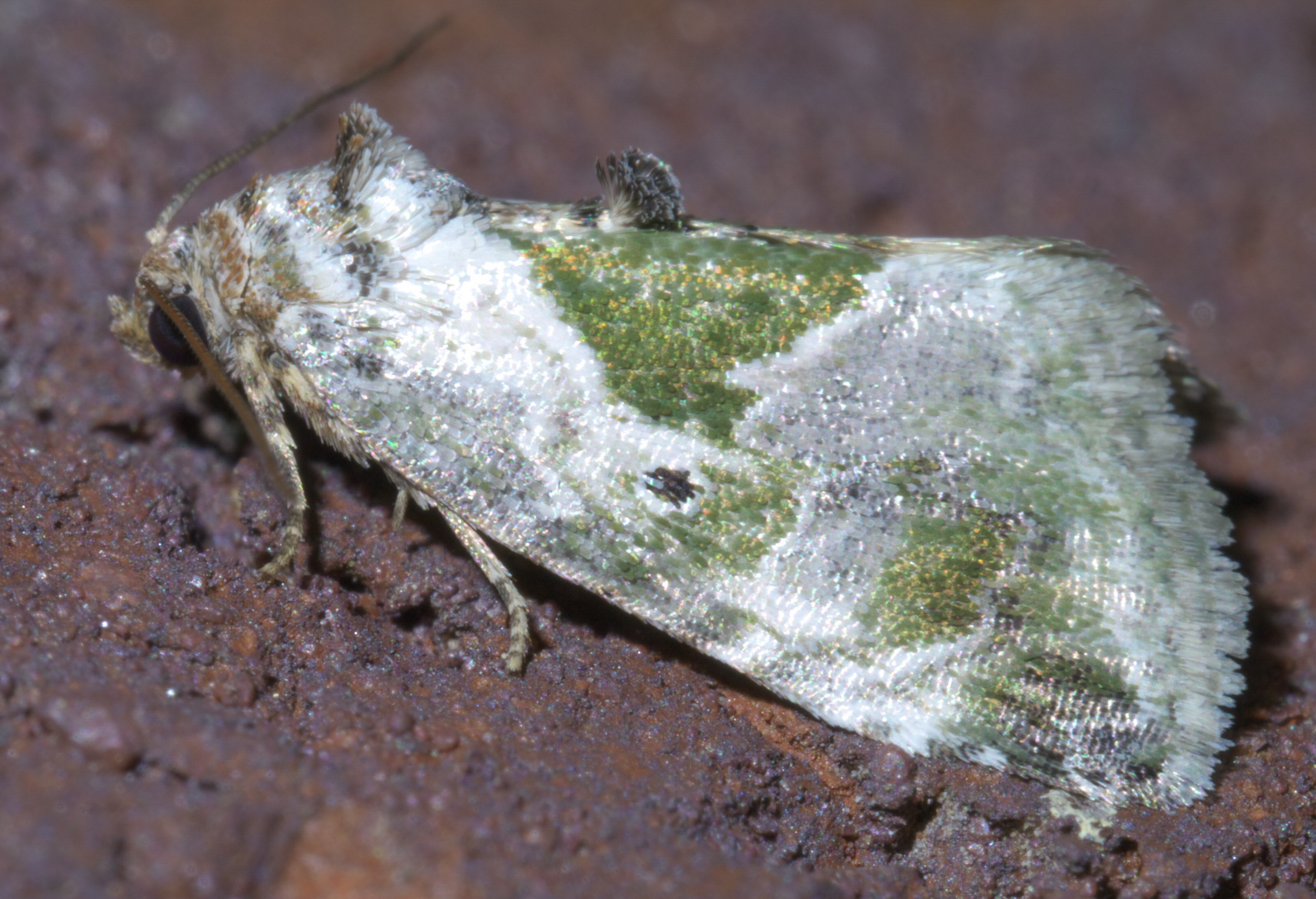
