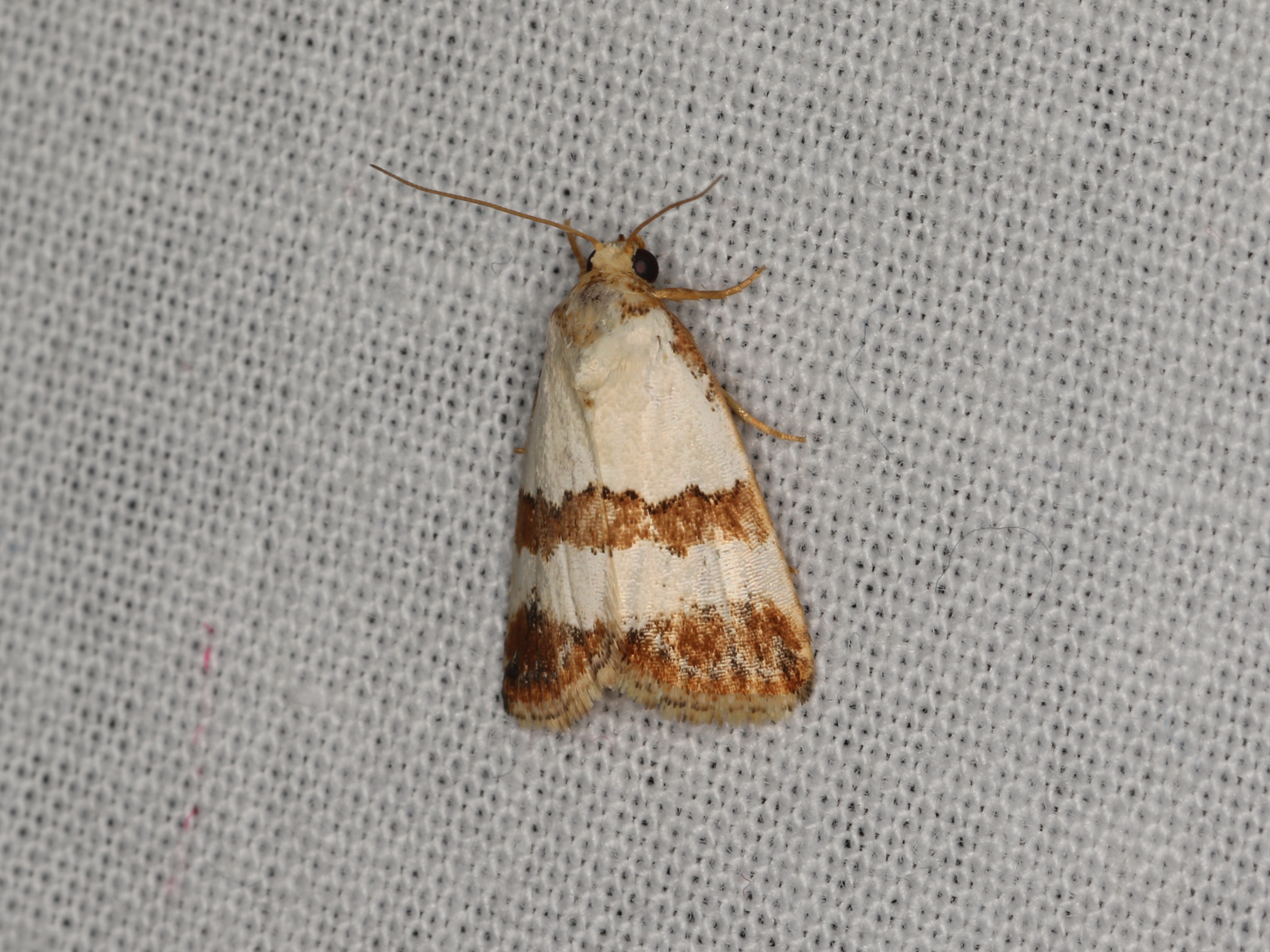

Scientific classification
- Domain: Eukaryota
- Kingdom: Animalia
- Phylum: Arthropoda
- Class: Insecta
- Order: Lepidoptera
- Superfamily: Noctuoidea
- Family: Noctuidae
- Genus: Maliattha
- Species: M. ritsemae

Binomial name
- Maliattha ritsemae (Snellen van Vollenhoven, 1880)

Synonyms
- Erastria ritsemae Snellen van Vollenhoven, 1880; Acontia vitiensis Butler, 1886; Erastria albofusca Pagenstecher, 1888; Eustrotia thermozona Hampson, 1910; Maliattha ritsemae interrupta Warren, 1913; Maliattha interrupta Warren 1913

= Maliattha ritsemae =

Species of moth

Maliattha ritsemae is a moth of the family Noctuidae. It was described by Samuel Constantinus Snellen van Vollenhoven in 1880. It is found on Sulawesi, Ambon Island, as well northern Australia and New Hebrides.
