= Maliattha concinnimacula =

Scientific classification
- Kingdom: Animalia
- Phylum: Arthropoda
- Clade: Pancrustacea
- Class: Insecta
- Order: Lepidoptera
- Superfamily: Noctuoidea
- Family: Noctuidae
- Genus: Maliattha
- Species: M. concinnimacula

Binomial name
- Maliattha concinnimacula (Guenée, 1852)

Species of moth

Maliattha concinnimacula, commonly known as the red-spotted maliattha or red-spotted lithacodia, is a species of moth in the family Noctuidae (the owlet moths).
