= Maliattha dubiefi =

Scientific classification
- Kingdom: Animalia
- Phylum: Arthropoda
- Clade: Pancrustacea
- Class: Insecta
- Order: Lepidoptera
- Superfamily: Noctuoidea
- Family: Noctuidae
- Genus: Maliattha
- Species: M. dubiefi

Binomial name
- Maliattha dubiefi Viette, 1982

Species of moth

Maliattha dubiefi is a moth of the family Noctuidae. It is found in Madagascar (Massif du Tsaratanana).
