= Iambia volasira =

Scientific classification
- Kingdom: Animalia
- Phylum: Arthropoda
- Class: Insecta
- Order: Lepidoptera
- Superfamily: Noctuoidea
- Family: Noctuidae
- Genus: Iambia
- Species: I. volasira

Binomial name
- Iambia volasira Viette, 1968

Species of moth

Iambia volasira is a moth of the family Noctuidae.

== Distribution ==
It is found in south-western Madagascar (near Tulear).
