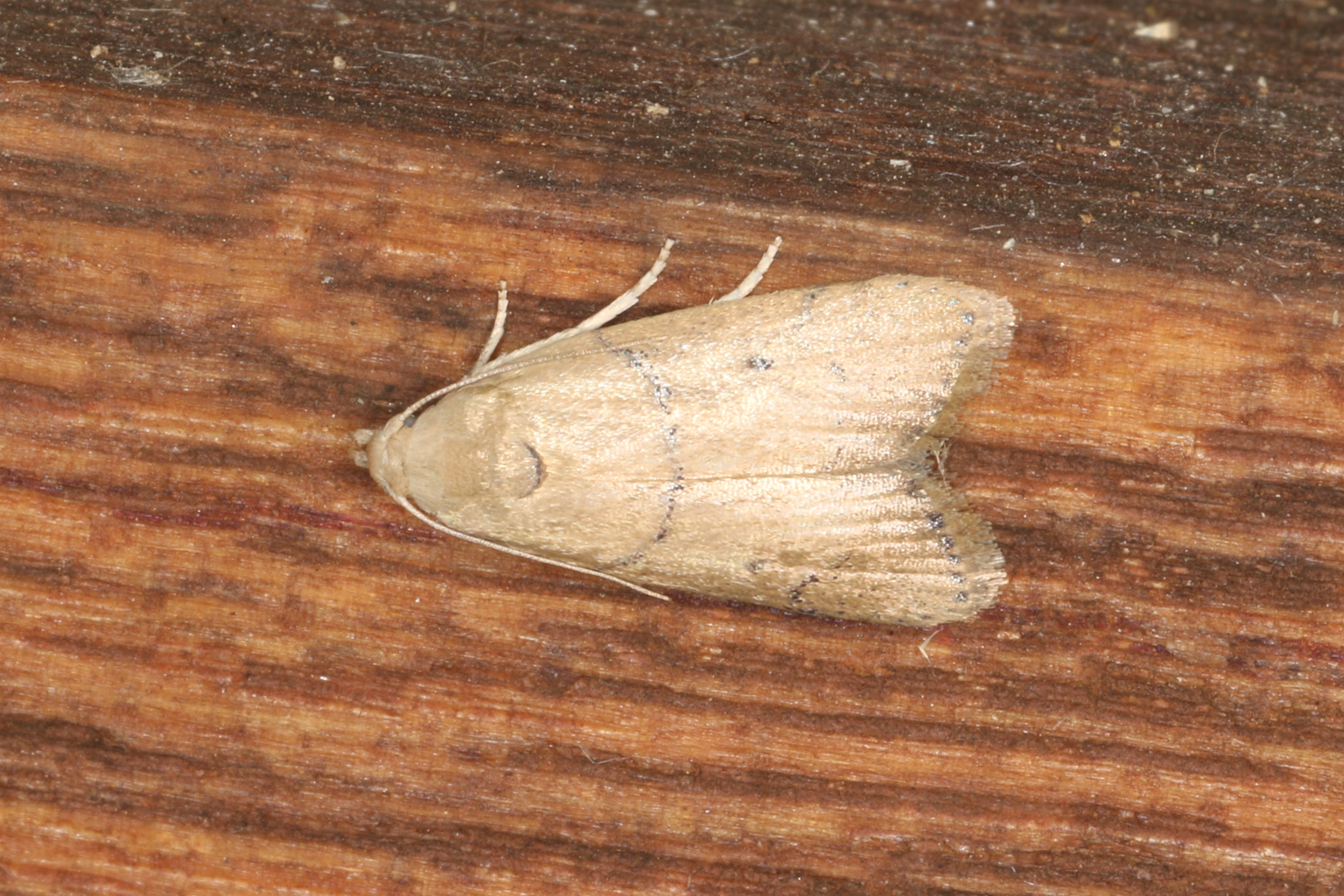

Scientific classification
- Domain: Eukaryota
- Kingdom: Animalia
- Phylum: Arthropoda
- Class: Insecta
- Order: Lepidoptera
- Family: Pyralidae
- Genus: Doloessa
- Species: D. ochrociliella

Binomial name
- Doloessa ochrociliella Ragonot, 1893

Synonyms
- Carcinoptera ochrociliella Ragonot, 1893; Doloessa plumbolineella Ragonot, 1901; Doloessa plumbolinella Hampson, 1917; Thagora castanella Hampson, 1896

= Doloessa ochrociliella =

Species of moth

Doloessa ochrociliella is a species of snout moth (family Pyralidae) in the genus Doloessa. It was described by Émile Louis Ragonot in 1893 and is known from Japan, Australia, Sri Lanka, and Taiwan.

== Description ==
The wingspan of the male is 18 mm and the female is 20 mm. The male is a very pale chestnut color. The forewings with curved antemedial line, the area beyond it suffused with rufous. A black discocellular specks and an obliquely curved postmedial line present. Fascia on underside of forewings and upperside of hindwings blackish. Female with base and costa of forewings deeper rufous, where the rest of the wings pale. The antemedial and postmedial lines and discocellular speck almost obsolete.
