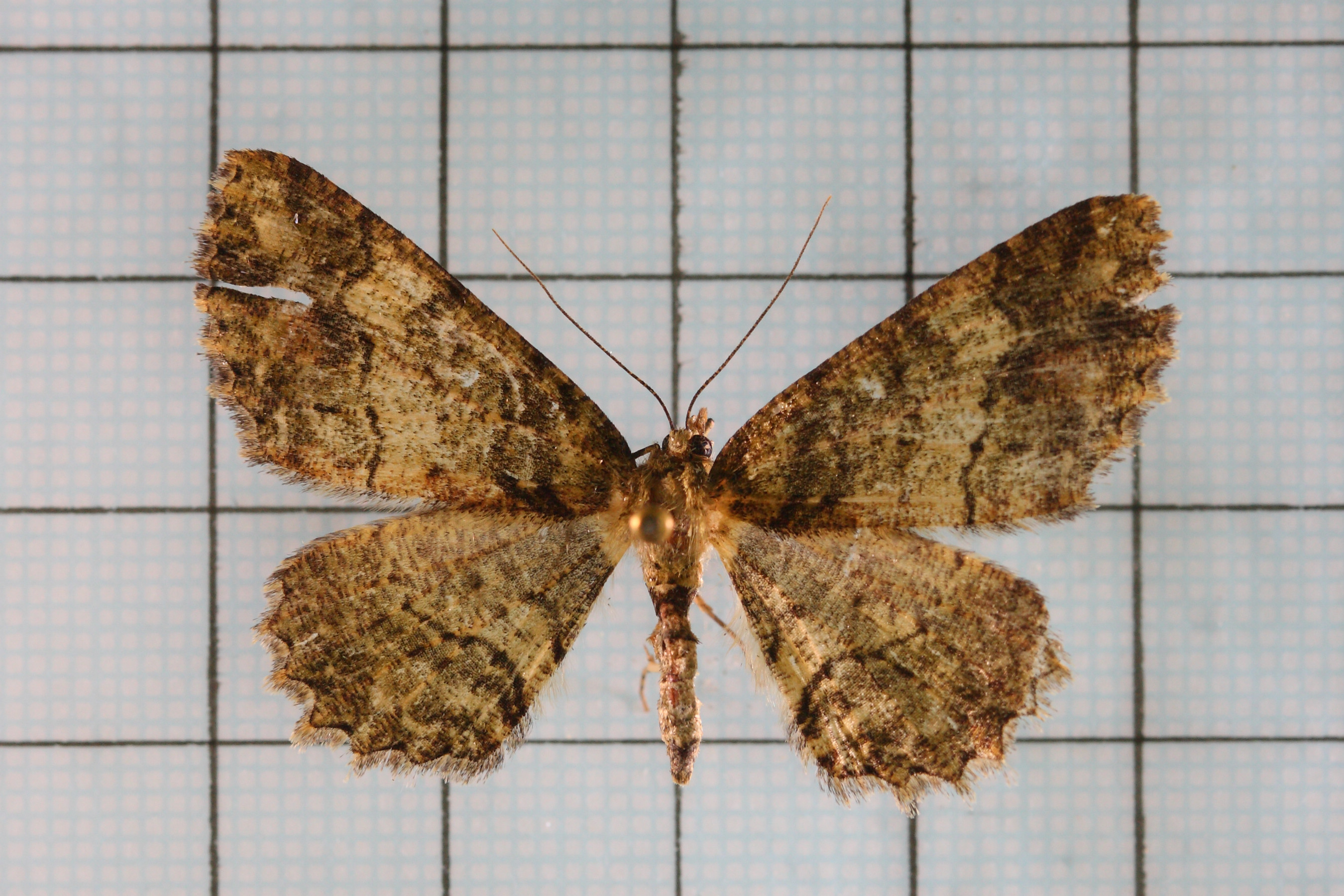
- Paradarisa comparataria rantaizanensis

Scientific classification
- Kingdom: Animalia
- Phylum: Arthropoda
- Class: Insecta
- Order: Lepidoptera
- Family: Geometridae
- Genus: Paradarisa
- Species: P. comparataria

Binomial name
- Paradarisa comparataria (Walker, 1866)

Synonyms
- Boarmia comparataria Walker, 1866; Boarmia exclusaria Walker, 1860

= Paradarisa comparataria =

Species of moth

Paradarisa comparataria is a moth of the family Geometridae. It is found in India and Taiwan.

== Subspecies ==
- Paradarisa comparataria comparataria
- Paradarisa comparataria rantaizanensis Wileman, 1911 (Taiwan)
