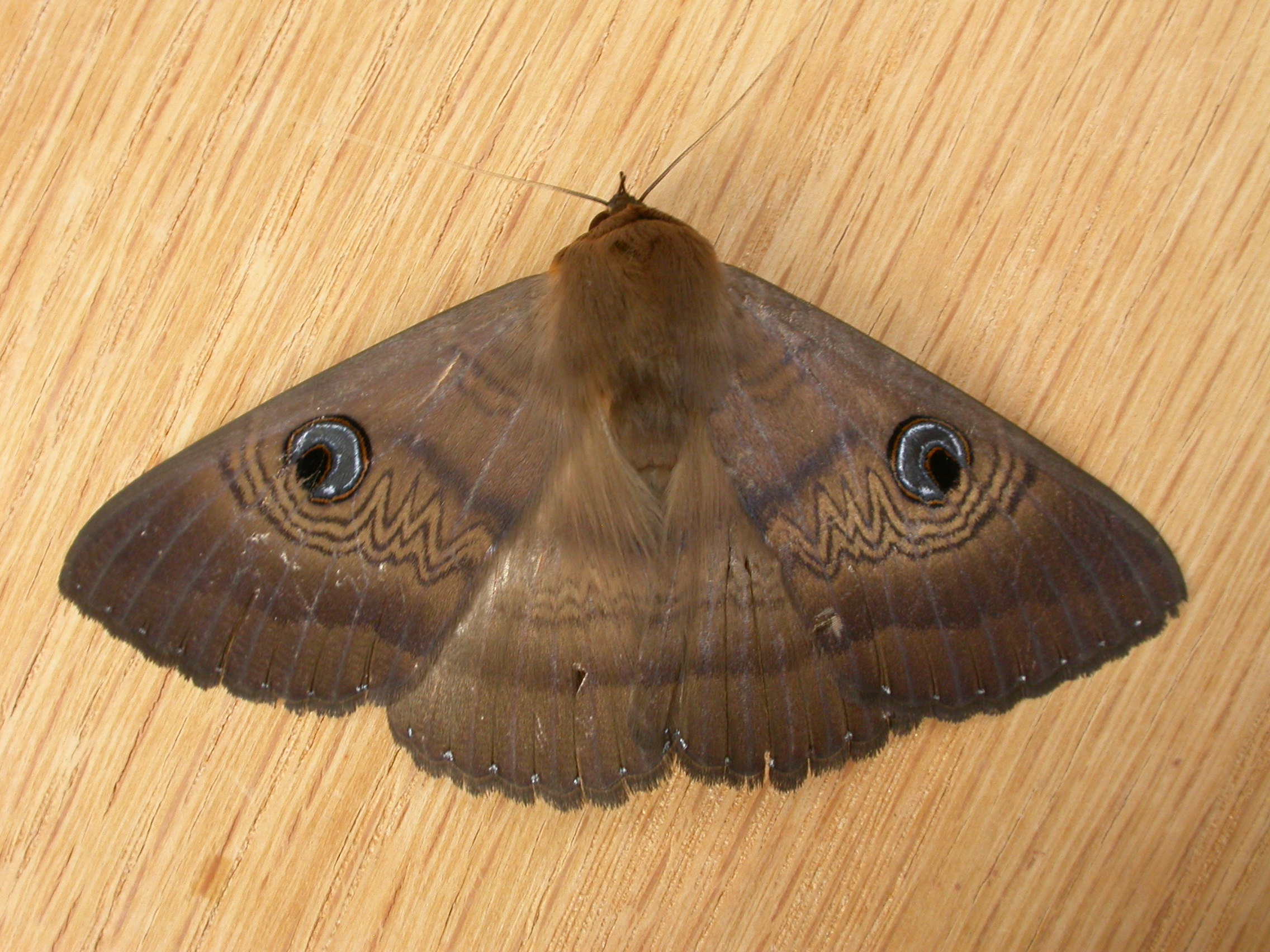

Scientific classification
- Kingdom: Animalia
- Phylum: Arthropoda
- Clade: Pancrustacea
- Class: Insecta
- Order: Lepidoptera
- Superfamily: Noctuoidea
- Family: Erebidae
- Genus: Dasypodia
- Species: D. selenophora

Binomial name
- Dasypodia selenophora Guenée, 1852

= Dasypodia selenophora =

Species of moth

Dasypodia selenophora, the southern old lady moth, southern moon moth, or granny moth, is a moth of the family Noctuidae. The species was first described by Achille Guenée in 1852. It is found in the southern half of Australia, as well as Norfolk Island, New Zealand and Macquarie Island.

The adult may be a range of brown shades, with large black and blue eyespots on the centre of the forewings. The body is hairy. The wingspan is about 90 mm. The southern old lady moth is commonly observed during the day in dark areas of homes and other buildings.

The larvae have long brown stripes along the body and short stiff hairs. They feed on Acacia species, including Tan Wattle (Acacia decurrens), Cootamundra Wattle (Acacia baileyana), Golden Wattle (Acacia pycnantha), and Silver Wattle (Acacia dealbata).

The caterpillars take about 3 weeks to mature.

== Gallery ==
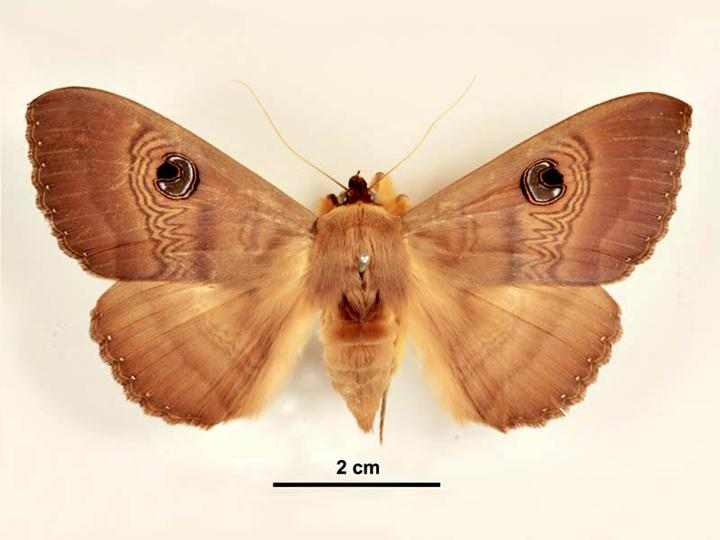
Female, dorsal view

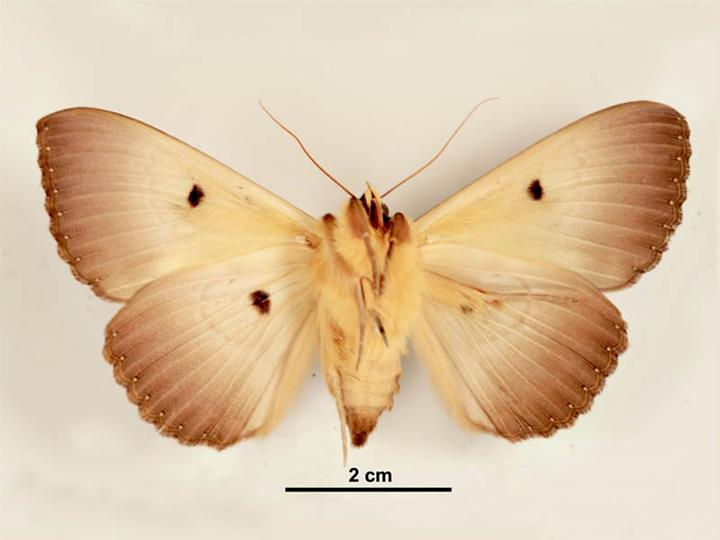
Female, ventral view

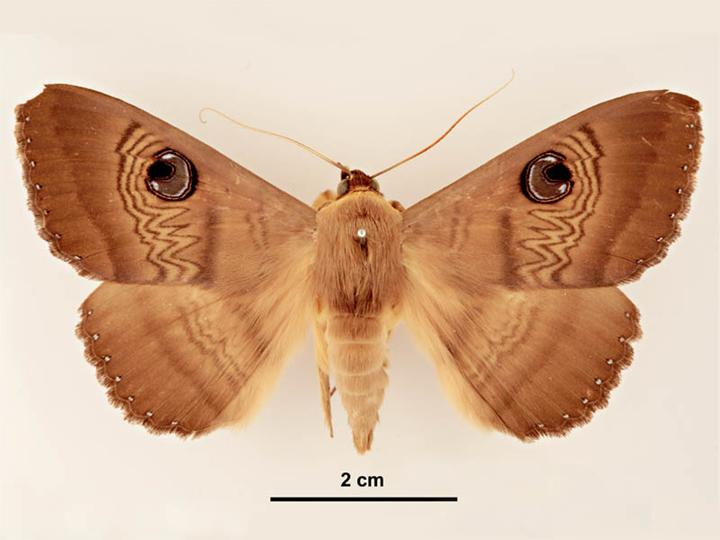
Male, dorsal view

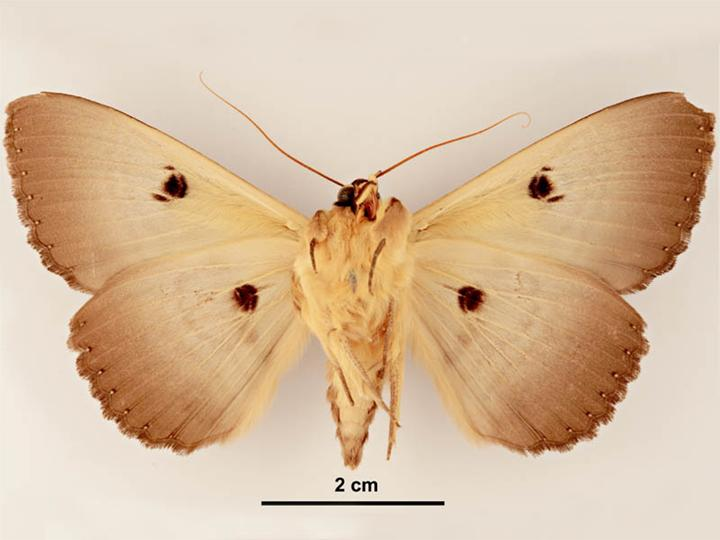
Male, ventral view
