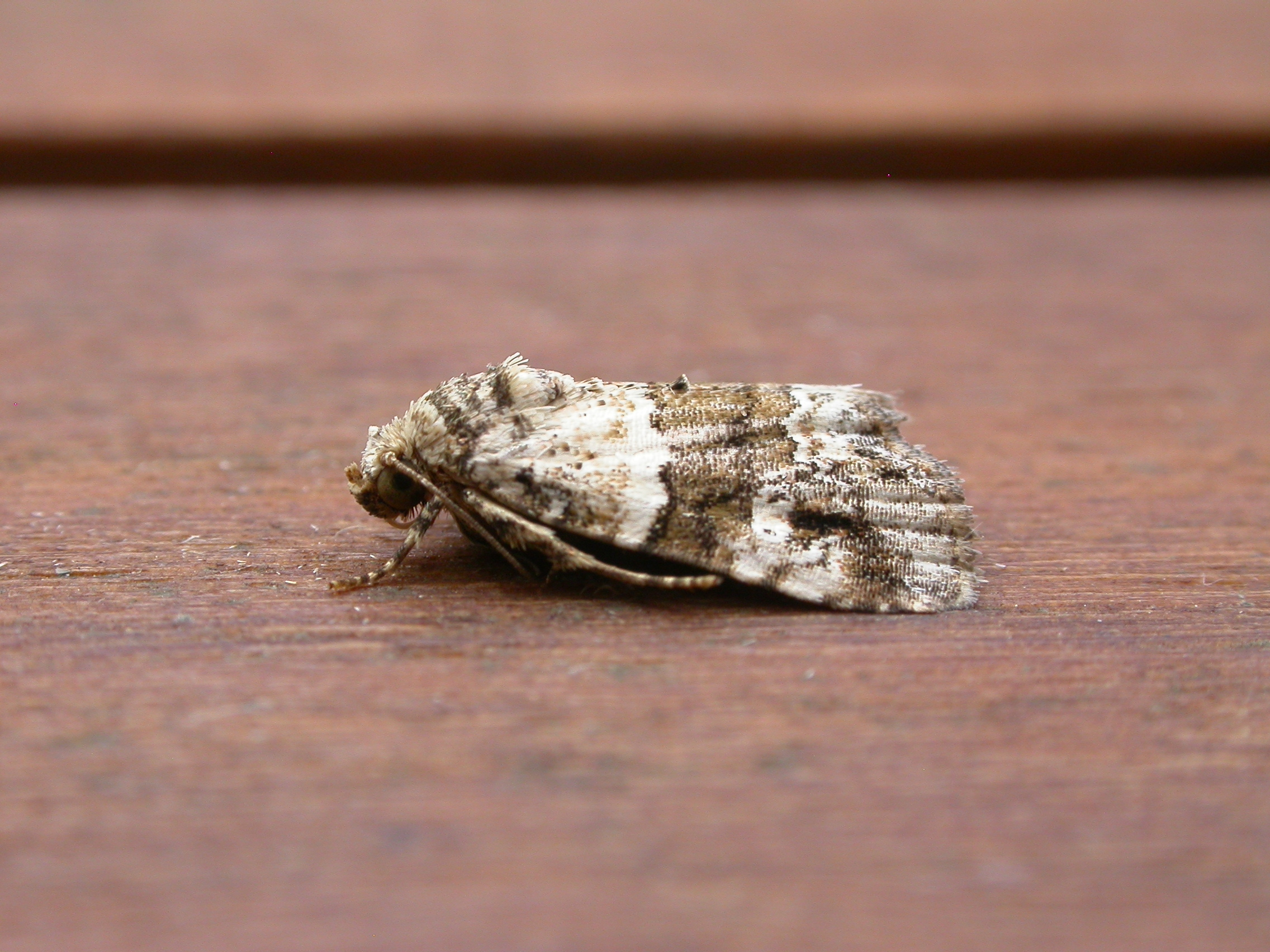

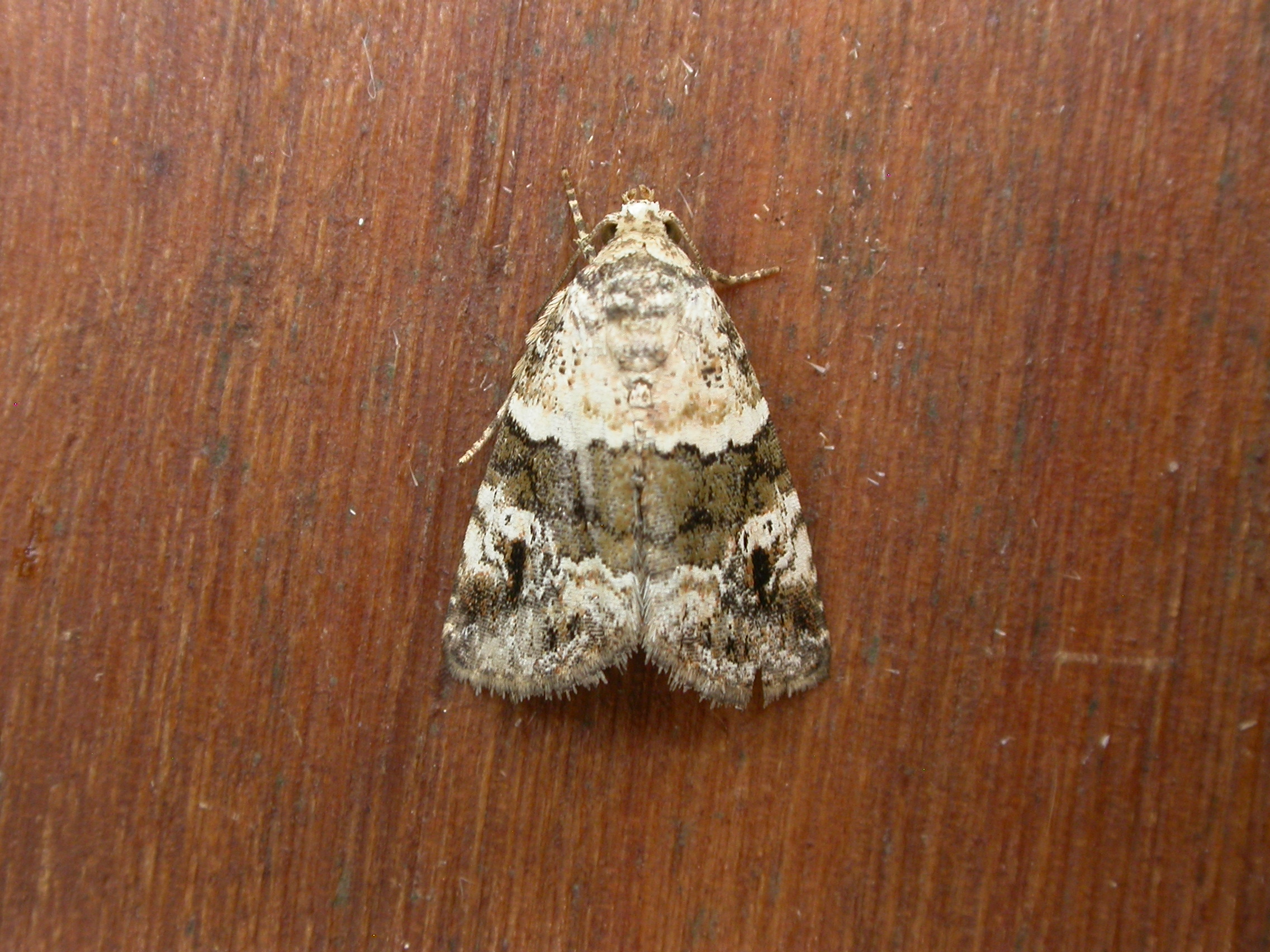

Scientific classification
- Kingdom: Animalia
- Phylum: Arthropoda
- Class: Insecta
- Order: Lepidoptera
- Superfamily: Noctuoidea
- Family: Noctuidae
- Genus: Maliattha
- Species: M. signifera

Binomial name
- Maliattha signifera (Walker, [1858])

Synonyms
- Acontia signifera Walker, [1858]; Acontia subfixa Walker, 1866; Maliattha signifera rufigrisea Warren, 1913; Maliattha basitincta Warren, 1913; Lithacodia signifera (Walker)

= Maliattha signifera =

Species of moth

Maliattha signifera is a species of moth of the family Noctuidae first described by Francis Walker in 1858. It is found in south-east Asia, including China, India, Japan, Taiwan, Korea and Thailand as well as in Australia (Queensland).

== Description ==
The wingspan is 15–18 mm. Antennae of male minutely ciliated. In male, head, thorax and abdomen ochreous white. Abdomen has two dorsal black tufts. Forewings with ochreous white basal and costal areas, with a slight fuscous tinge. The outer area, which extends from the apex to center of inner margin, dark purplish fuscous and crossed by the irregularly-waved whitish postmedial line, which becomes pure white towards inner margin. A diffused dark somewhat dentate submarginal line and a marginal series of short dark strigae present. Hindwings are pale fuscous. Ventral side of forewings fuscous, with pinkish ochreous costal and outer areas. Ventral side of hindwings pinkish ochreous, with cell spot and curved postmedial line.

In female, body more suffused with fuscous. Forewings with outer pinkish area in tone. There are two prominent white lunules present on postmedial line above inner margin. Hindwings dark fuscous, with ochreous outer margin and cilia.

== Ecology ==
Spherical eggs are translucent white, which are laid in a regular hexagonal array.
