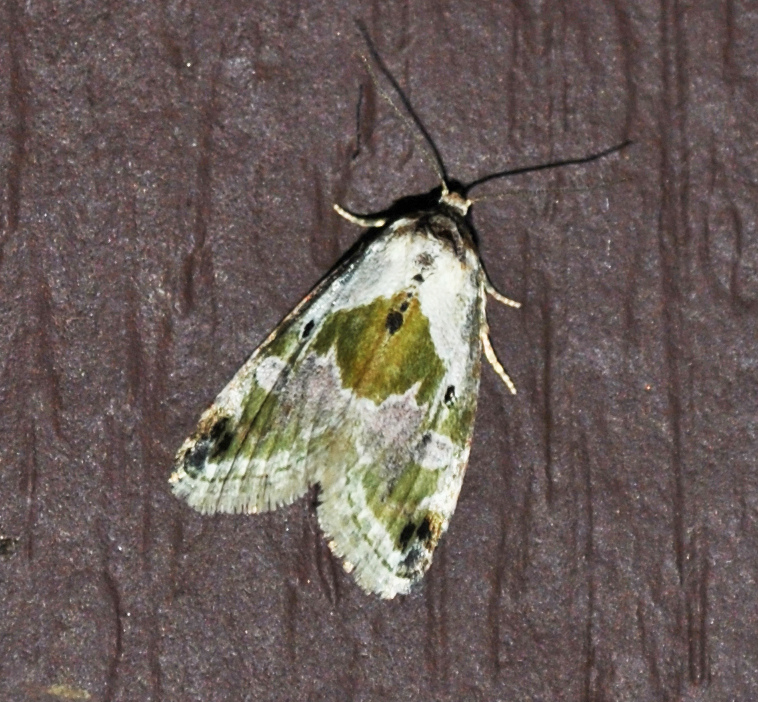
- Maliattha synochitis

Scientific classification
- Kingdom: Animalia
- Phylum: Arthropoda
- Class: Insecta
- Order: Lepidoptera
- Superfamily: Noctuoidea
- Family: Noctuidae
- Subfamily: Eustrotiinae
- Genus: Maliattha; Walker, 1863

Type species
- Maliattha separata Walker, 1863

Synonyms
- Hyelopsis Hampson, 1894; Proschora Turner, 1945; Inabaia Sugi, 1982

= Maliattha =

Genus of moths

Maliattha is a genus of moths of the family Noctuidae first described by Francis Walker in 1863.

== Description ==
Palpi upturned, reaching above vertex of head, where the second joint clothed with long hair below, and third joint prominent. Antennae minutely ciliated in male. Thorax roughly scaled but tuftless. Abdomen with strong dorsal tufts, and shorter than the hindwings. Forewings narrow. Hindwings with veins 3 and 4 stalked. Legs naked. Larva with four pairs of abdominal prolegs.

== Species ==
- Maliattha amorpha Butler, 1886
- Maliattha angustitaenia Warren, 1913
- Maliattha arefacta Butler, 1879
- Maliattha baetica Swinhoe, 1890
- Maliattha bella Staudinger, 1888
- Maliattha bicolor Viette, 1982
- Maliattha bilineata Hampson, 1898
- Maliattha blandula (Guenée, 1862)
- Maliattha chionozona Hampson, 1910
- Maliattha commersoni Viette, 1965
- Maliattha concinnimacula Guenée, 1852
- Maliattha curvilinea Warren, 1913
- Maliattha dubiefi Viette, 1982
- Maliattha erecta Moore, 1881
- Maliattha euryzona Hampson, 1910
- Maliattha ferrugina Turner, 1908
- Maliattha fervens Hampson, 1907
- Maliattha fuliginosa Warren, 1913
- Maliattha fuscimima Warren, 1913
- Maliattha guttifera Warren, 1913
- Maliattha inconcisa Butler, 1882
- Maliattha inconcisoides Holloway, 1979
- Maliattha khasanica Zolotarenko & Dubatolov, 1995
- Maliattha lacteata Warren, 1913
- Maliattha latifasciata Hampson, 1898
- Maliattha lativitta Moore, 1881
- Maliattha lemur Viette, 1965
- Maliattha mabnora Viette, 1982
- Maliattha marginalis Walker, [1863]
- Maliattha melaleuca Hampson, 1910
- Maliattha melanesiensis Robinson, 1975
- Maliattha ocellata Saalmüller, 1891
- Maliattha opposita Saalmüller, 1891
- Maliattha perrieri Viette, 1965
- Maliattha phaeozona Hampson, 1910
- Maliattha picata Butler, 1889
- Maliattha plumbata Butler, 1889
- Maliattha plumbitincta Hampson, 1902
- Maliattha pratti Viette, 1965
- Maliattha quadripartita Walker, 1865
- Maliattha rectilinea Viette, 1982
- Maliattha renalis Moore, 1882
- Maliattha ritsemae Snellen, 1880
- Maliattha rosacea Leech, 1889
- Maliattha ruptifascia Hampson, 1891
- Maliattha separata Walker, 1863
- Maliattha sexpartita Warren, 1913
- Maliattha signifera Walker, [1858]
- Maliattha sogai Viette, 1965
- Maliattha subcrocea Berio, 1960
- Maliattha subterminalis Warren, 1913
- Maliattha synochitis Grote & Robinson, 1868
- Maliattha tegulata Butler, 1889
- Maliattha toulgoeti Viette, 1965
- Maliattha tsaratanana Viette, 1965
- Maliattha umbrina Hampson, 1891
- Maliattha vialis Moore, 1882
