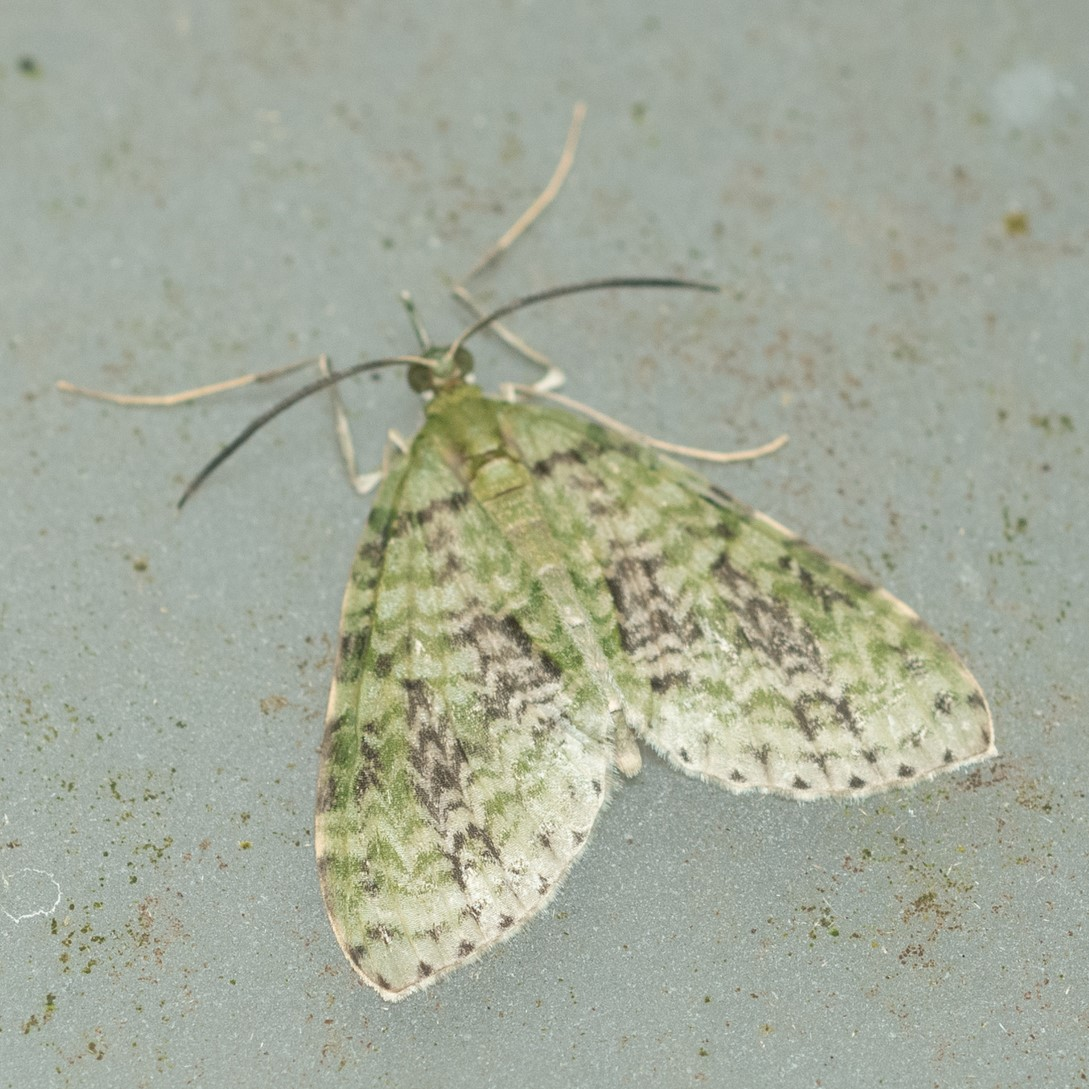

Scientific classification
- Kingdom: Animalia
- Phylum: Arthropoda
- Class: Insecta
- Order: Lepidoptera
- Family: Geometridae
- Genus: Sauris
- Species: S. hirudinata

Binomial name
- Sauris hirudinata Guenée, 1858

Synonyms
- Remodes abortivata Guenée, 1857; Remodes lobata Warren, 1895; Sauris remodesaria Walker, 1862

= Sauris hirudinata =

Species of moth

Sauris hirudinata is a species of moth in the family Geometridae. It was first described by Achille Guenée in 1858. It is found in Fiji, Sri Lanka, India, China (Hong Kong), as well as on Peninsular Malaysia and Borneo.

== Description ==
Its wingspan is about 28 mm in male and 28–38 mm in female. Forewings of male with distorted outer angle clothed with curved hair on underside, Hind tibia with a tuft of long hair from extremity. Paired lateral tufts from base of abdomen. Head and thorax olive-green, with slight dark markings. Antennae black. Forewings olive green, irrorated with silvery scales. There are numerous indistinct waved green lines, one sub-basal line, two antemedial, three postmedial and one submarginal being purplish fuscous. Some purplish suffusion found in interno-median interspace and beyond cell. A speck can be at end of cell. Margin purplish, with a black spot series. Abdomen and hindwings fuscous.

== Subspecies ==
- Sauris hirudinata hirudinata
- Sauris hirudinata abortivata Guenée, 1857 (Peninsular Malaysia and Borneo)
