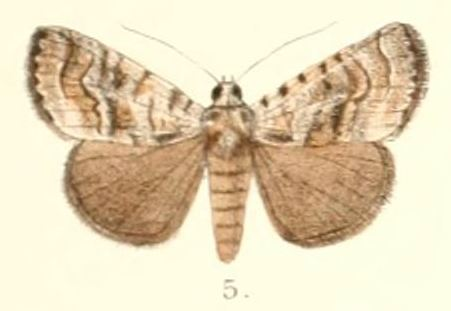

Scientific classification
- Domain: Eukaryota
- Kingdom: Animalia
- Phylum: Arthropoda
- Class: Insecta
- Order: Lepidoptera
- Superfamily: Noctuoidea
- Family: Noctuidae
- Genus: Iambia
- Species: I. transversa

Binomial name
- Iambia transversa (Moore, 1882)

Synonyms
- Tycracona transversa Moore, 1882

= Iambia transversa =

Species of moth

Iambia transversa is a moth of the family Noctuidae first described by Frederic Moore in 1882.

== Distribution ==
It is found in Asia, from India to Japan and in Africa in Nigeria, South Africa and Zimbabwe.
