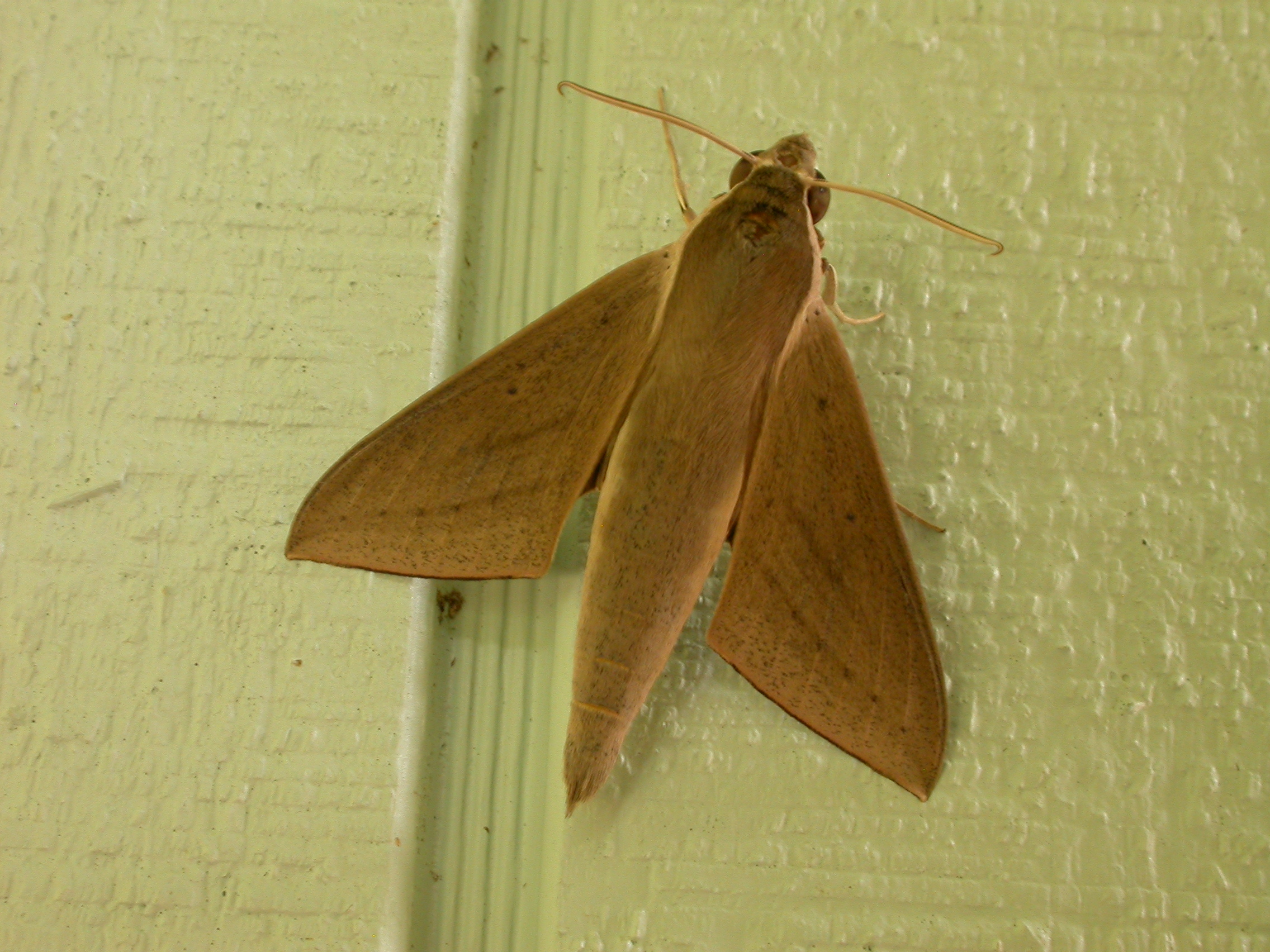

Scientific classification
- Kingdom: Animalia
- Phylum: Arthropoda
- Class: Insecta
- Order: Lepidoptera
- Family: Sphingidae
- Genus: Theretra
- Species: T. latreillii

Binomial name
- Theretra latreillii (Macleay, 1826)

Synonyms
- Sphinx latreillii W.S. Macleay, 1826; Chaerocampa amara Swinhoe, 1892; Chaerocampa comminuens Walker, 1865; Chaerocampa deserta Butler, 1876; Chaerocampa walduckii Butler, 1877; Chaerocampa lucasii

= Theretra latreillii =

Pale brown hawk moth

Species of moth

Theretra latreillii, the pale brown hawk moth, is a moth of the family Sphingidae described by William Sharp Macleay in 1826. It is found in most of Asia, including Borneo, China, Hong Kong, the Philippines, Taiwan and also throughout the tropical and temperate regions of Australia.

== Description ==
The adult grows to a length of about 70 millimetres (2.8 in). The body is ochreous brown. Antennae, head front and sides of thorax are paler. Forewing with a black speck at end of cell. There are two oblique indistinct lines from near the apex to near base of inner margin. Three similar lines running from the apex nearly parallel to outer margin. Hindwing is smoky black with paler towards anal angle. Ventral side is with a slight rosy tinge. The subspecies T. l. tenebrosa is darker on both upper and undersides than T. l. lucasii, which again is darker than T. l. rhesus. Larva is brown with darker specks. A pale lateral line runs on thoracic somites. Ocellus on 4th somite is whitish, centered with a black ring on an ochreous ground.

Larvae have been recorded on Parthenocissus quinquefolia, Cayratia clematidea, Cayratia corniculata, Impatiens walleriana, Leea indica, Lagerstroemia indica and Fuchsia species.

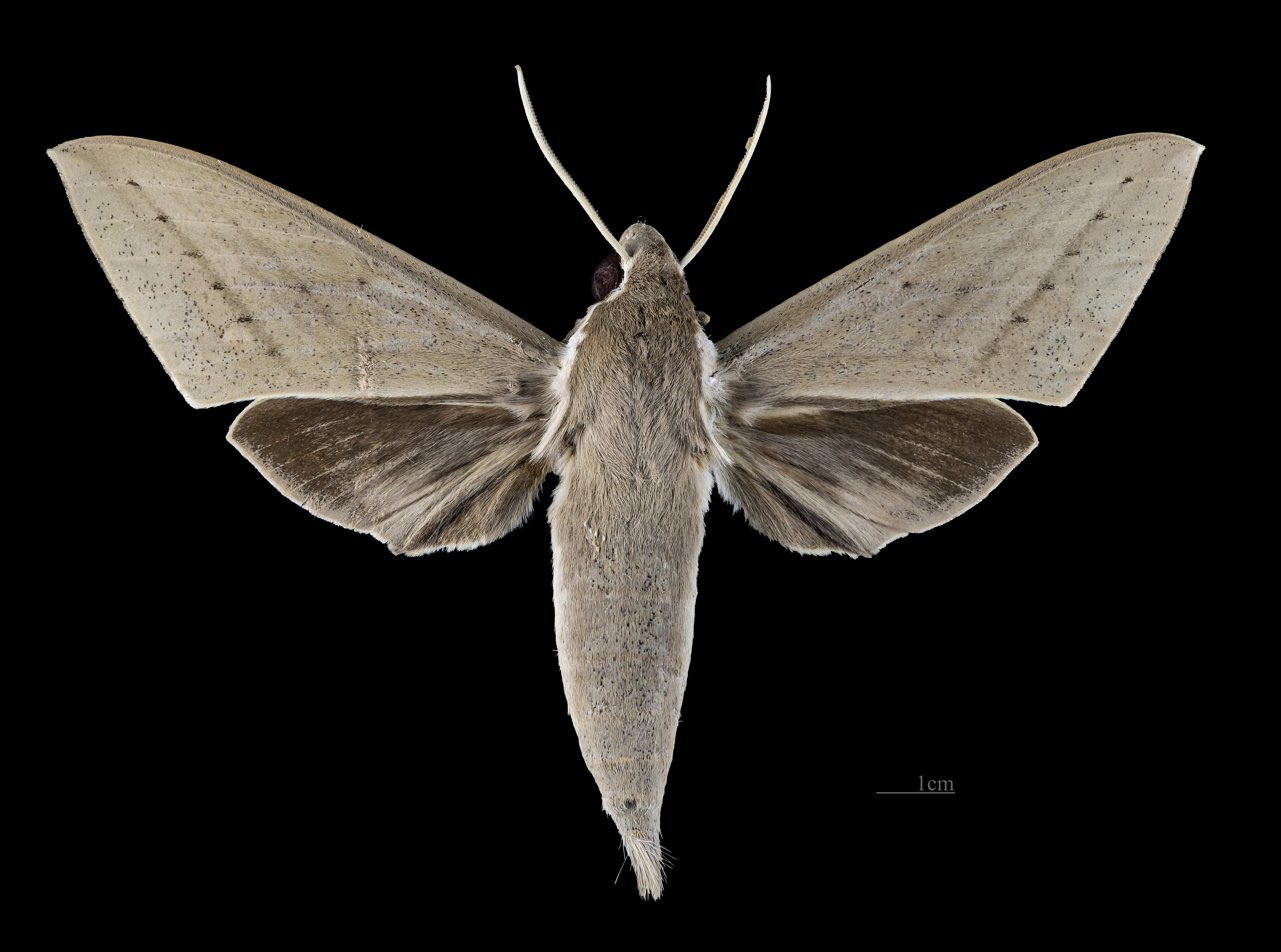
Male dorsal

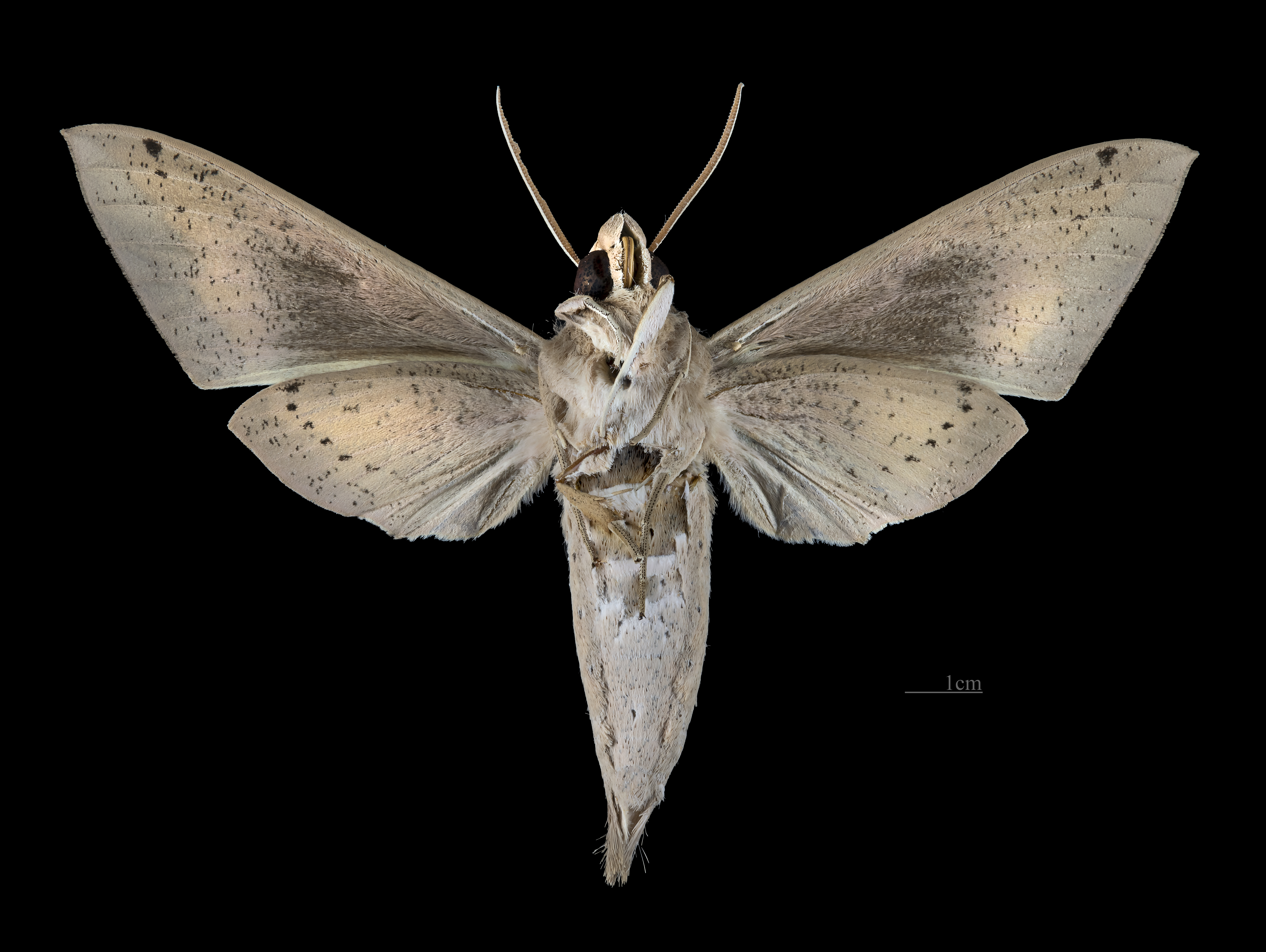
Male ventral

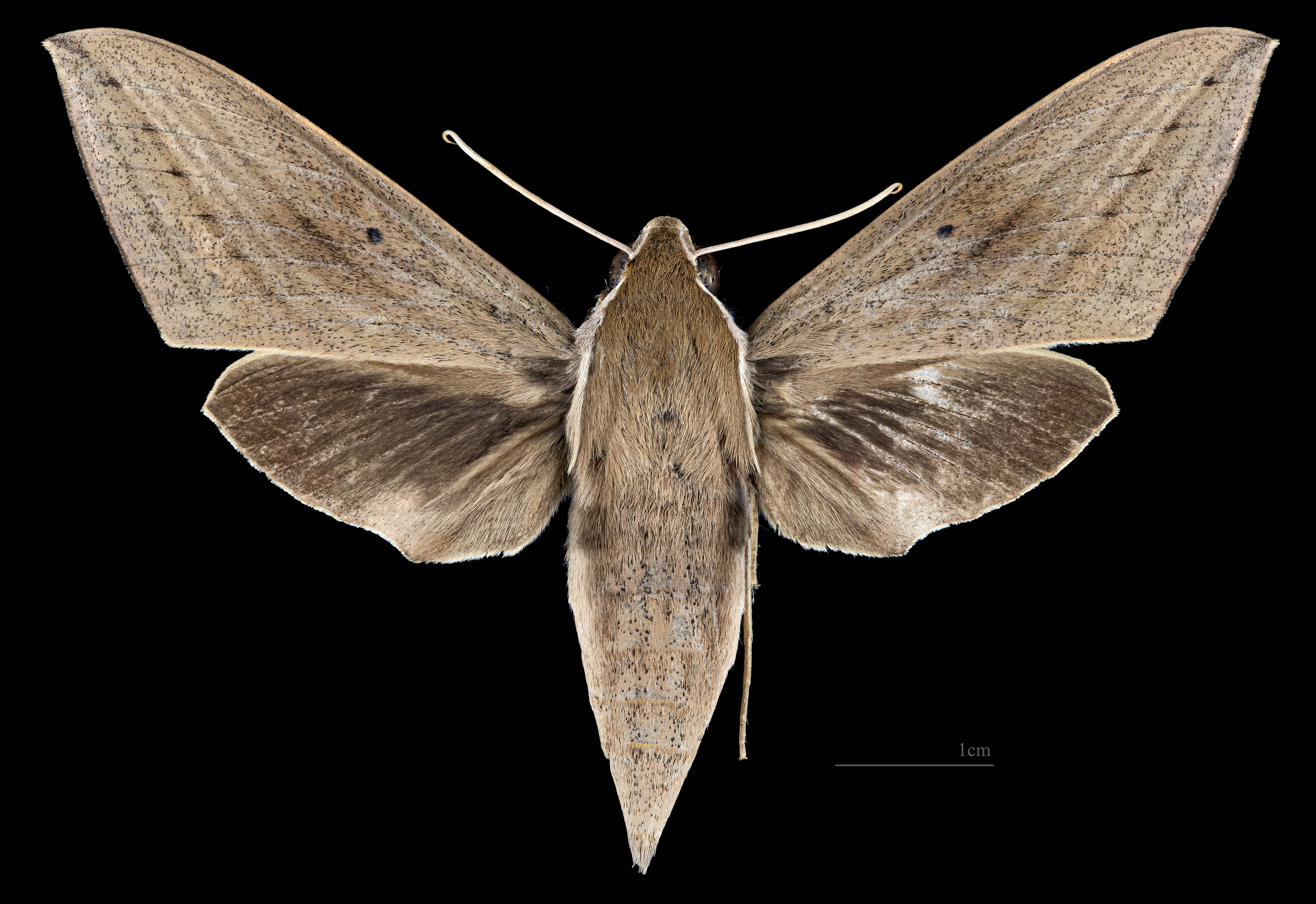
Female dorsal

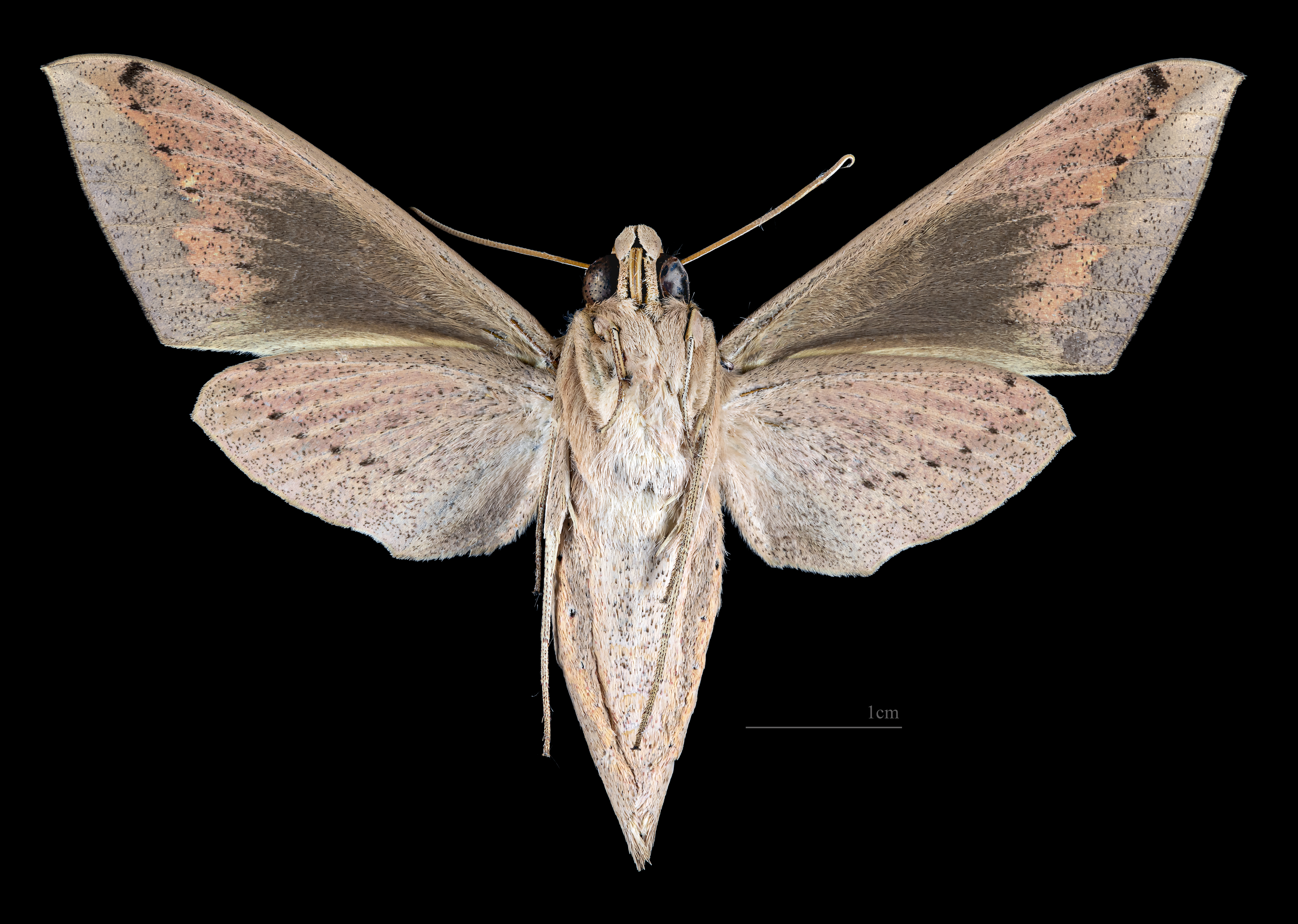
Female ventral

== Subspecies ==
- Theretra latreillii latreillii - nominate from Australia
- Theretra latreillii lucasii (Walker, 1856) (Sri Lanka, southern and north-eastern India, Nepal, Bangladesh, Myanmar, the Andaman Islands, Thailand, southern and eastern China, Taiwan, Vietnam, Indonesia and the Philippines)
- Theretra latreillii prattorum Clark, 1924 (Indonesia)
