= Lyclene distributa =

Scientific classification
- Kingdom: Animalia
- Phylum: Arthropoda
- Class: Insecta
- Order: Lepidoptera
- Superfamily: Noctuoidea
- Family: Erebidae
- Subfamily: Arctiinae
- Genus: Lyclene
- Species: L. distributa

Binomial name
- Lyclene distributa Walker, 1862

Synonyms
- Nola distributa; Asura distributa

Species of moth

Lyclene distributa is a moth of the family Erebidae first described by Francis Walker in 1862. It is found in Borneo, Peninsular Malaysia and Sumatra.
