= Morus notabilis =

Conservation status
- Least Concern (IUCN 3.1)

Scientific classification
- Kingdom: Plantae
- Clade: Tracheophytes
- Clade: Angiosperms
- Clade: Eudicots
- Clade: Rosids
- Order: Rosales
- Family: Moraceae
- Genus: Morus
- Species: M. notabilis

Binomial name
- Morus notabilis C.K. Schneid.

Synonyms
- Morus mongolica var. yunnanensis (Koidz.) C.Y.Wu & Z.Y.Cao; Morus yunnanensis Koidz.

Species of plant in the family Moraceae

Morus notabilis is a species of mulberry found in Yunnan and Sichuan provinces of south-central China. It grows in evergreen broadleaf forests at around 1,300 to 2,800 metres (4,300 to 9,200 feet) in elevation. It was first formally named by Camillo Karl Schneider in 1916.

It has 2n = 14 chromosomes, suggesting that it is basal to all the other species in its genus. Chromosome number ranges among species in the genus; for comparison, there are 28 in M. indica and 308 in M. nigra.
