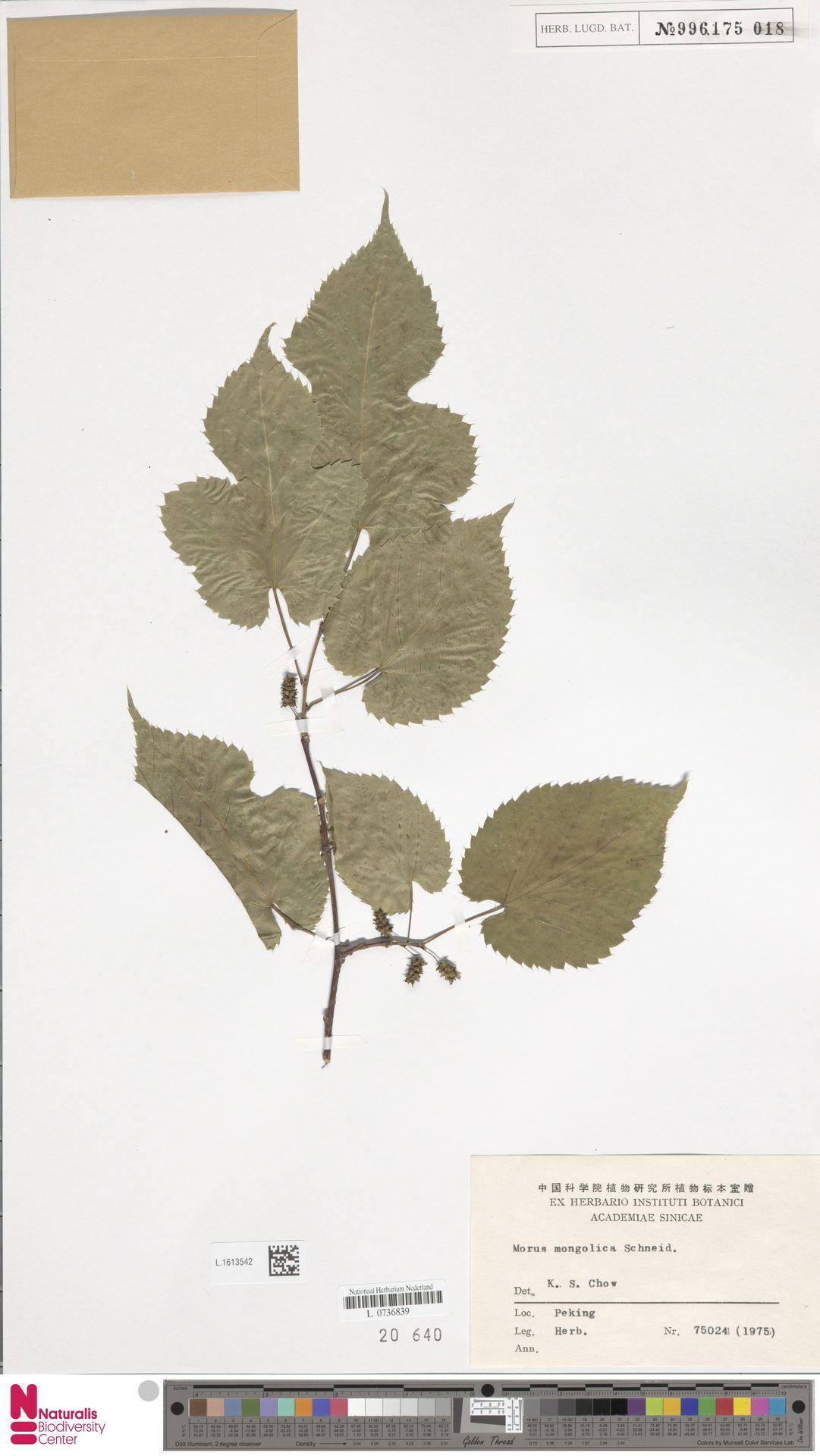

Conservation status
- Least Concern (IUCN 3.1)

Scientific classification
- Kingdom: Plantae
- Clade: Tracheophytes
- Clade: Angiosperms
- Clade: Eudicots
- Clade: Rosids
- Order: Rosales
- Family: Moraceae
- Genus: Morus
- Species: M. mongolica

Binomial name
- Morus mongolica (Bureau) C.K.Schneid.

Synonyms
- Morus alba var. mongolica Bureau; Morus barkamensis S.S.Chang; Morus deqinensis S.S.Chang; Morus mongolica var. barkamensis (S.S.Chang) C.Y.Wu & Z.Y.Cao; Morus mongolica var. diabolica Koidz.; Morus mongolica var. hopeiensis S.S.Chang; Morus mongolica var. longicaudata Z.Y.Cao; Morus mongolica var. pubescens S.C.Li & X.M.Liu; Morus mongolica var. rotundifolia Y.B.Wu; Morus mongolica var. vestita Rehder

= Morus mongolica =

Species of fruit and plant

Morus mongolica, also described as Morus alba var. mongolica, is a woody plant native to mountain forests in Mongolia, China, Korea, and Japan. Common names include Mongolian mulberry, meng sang (China), and ilama by native people in the namesake region of Mongolia. Similar to M. notabilis, M. mongolica is an uncultivated (wild, undomesticated) mulberry.

== Description ==
Morus mongolica is a perennial woody tree. The mature plant grows to about 8 metres (26 feet) in height. The leaves of the tree are palmate, with mature dimensions ranging from 8–15 centimetres (3 1/4–6 inches) in length and 5–8 cm (2–3 1/4 in) in width.

The flowers occur in inflorescences, both male and female. The male inflorescences are about 3–4 cm (1 1/4–1 1/2 in) long and 7 millimetres (1/4 in) wide, whereas the female inflorescences are about 2 cm long and 7 mm wide; both have peduncles of about 1–1.5 cm. Both the male and the female flowers are in groups of fours: four sepals, four petals, four stamen (for male flowers) and four carpels (for female flowers). The tree blooms from March to April and fruits in April to May.

The fruits are aggregate, and are dull red to black in color. Each cluster is about 1–3 cm long with a 1 cm diameter, while the individual drupelets are about 3 mm in diameter.

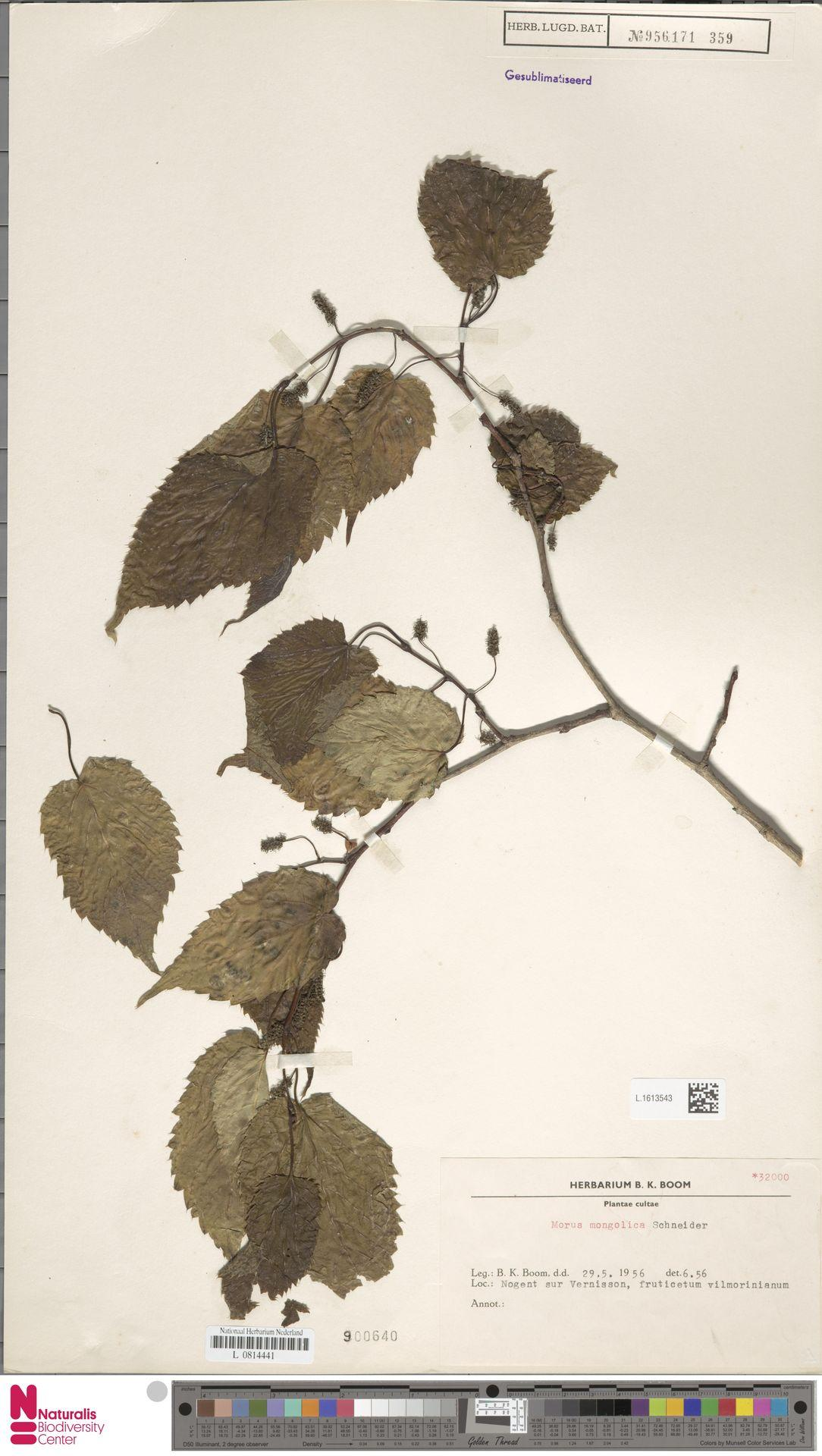
11648 Botany L 1613543 Naturalis Biodiversity Center

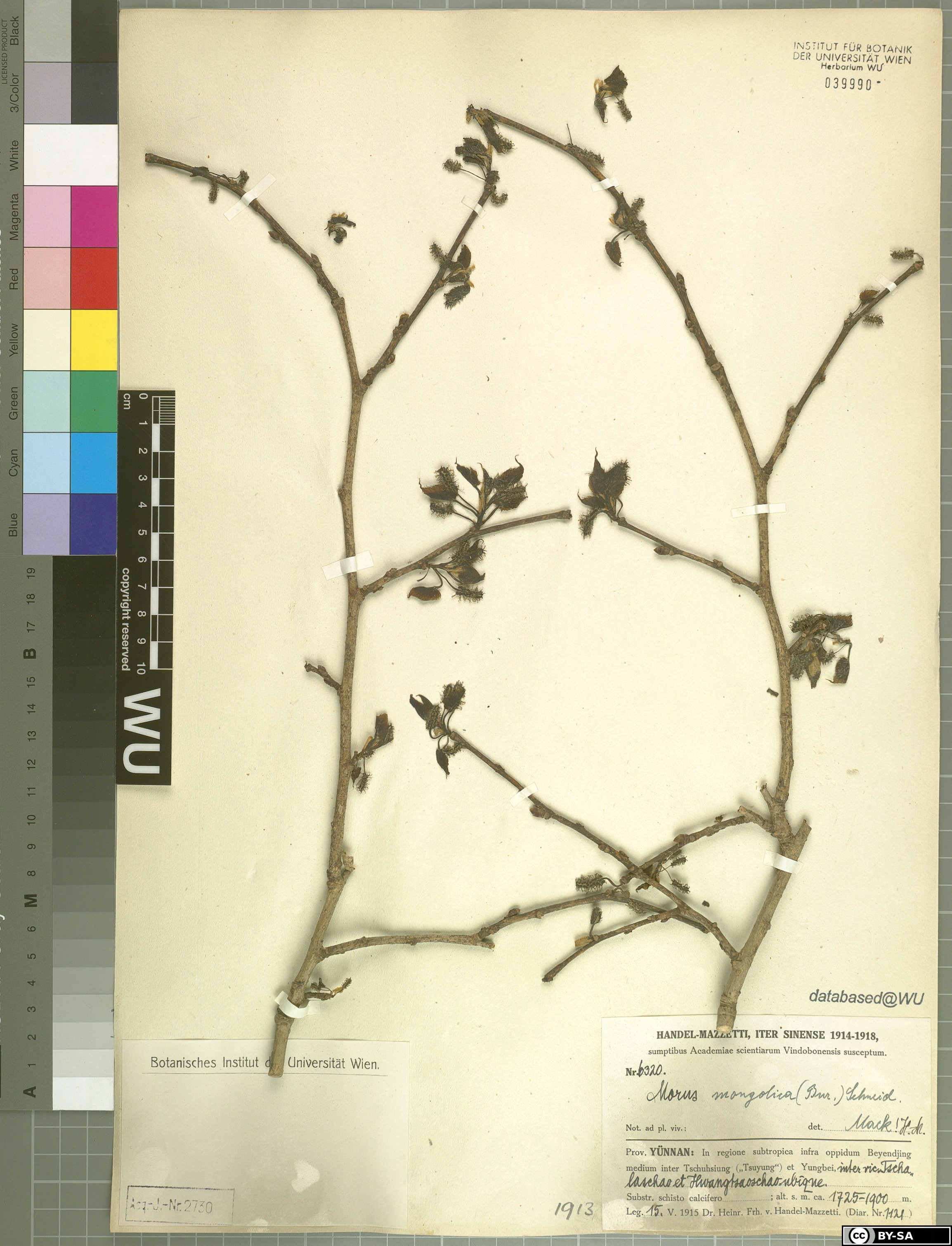
Morus mongolica (dried) University of Vienna Institute for Botany Herbarium 2

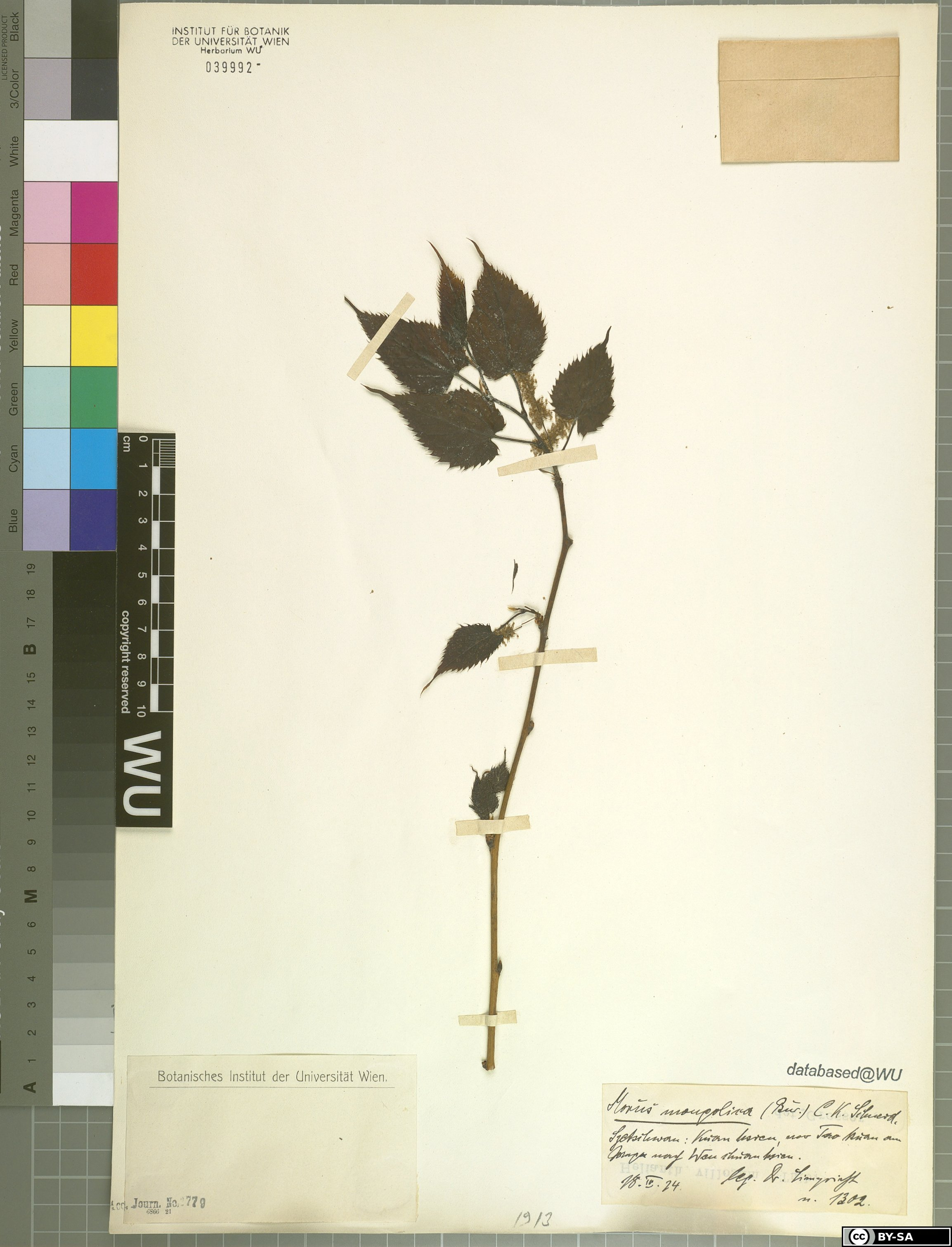
Morus mongolica (dried) University of Vienna Institute for Botany Herbarium 3

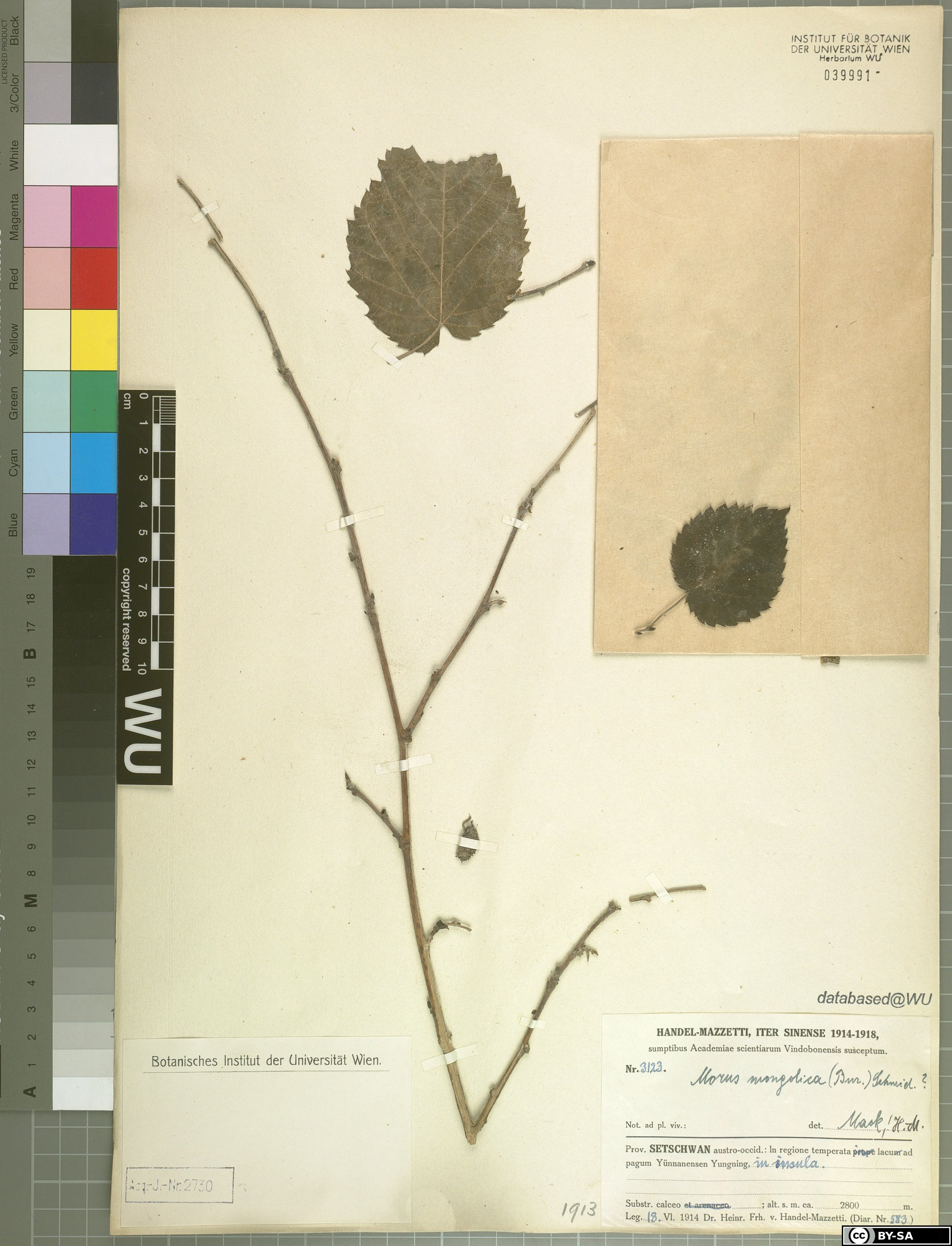
Morus mongolica (dried) University of Vienna Institute for Botany Herbarium 1

=== Chemistry ===
Morus mongolica is known to have multiple flavonoid and phenolic compounds. These compounds can be found in the fruits, leaves, and bark.

== Distribution ==
Its native range is the mountains of Mongolia, China, Korea, and Japan.

== Ecology ==
The leaves are eaten and digested by silkworms and the proteins are used by the silkworms for the production of cocoon silk.

== Uses ==
The fruits have been recorded as being consumed by Mongol herdsmen.

The wood of the plant has been suggested to be of possible use for biofuel, among other soft wood trees.

== See also ==
- Morus (plant)
- Morus alba
- Flora of China
