= Morus serrata =

Conservation status
- Least Concern (IUCN 3.1)

Scientific classification
- Kingdom: Plantae
- Clade: Tracheophytes
- Clade: Angiosperms
- Clade: Eudicots
- Clade: Rosids
- Order: Rosales
- Family: Moraceae
- Genus: Morus
- Species: M. serrata

Binomial name
- Morus serrata Roxb.

Synonyms
- Morus alba var. serrata (Roxb.) Bureau; Morus gyirongensis X.S.Zhang; Morus pabularia Decne.; Morus vicorum Jacquem. ex Decne.

Species of plant

Morus serrata, known as Himalayan mulberry, is a species of mulberry native to the Himalaya from northern Pakistan through northwestern and northeastern India, Nepal, Bhutan, and Tibet, in temperate forests at elevations of up to 3,000 metres (9,800 feet).

It is a deciduous tree growing to 15 m (49 ft) tall. The leaves are 10–14 centimetres (4–5 1/2 inches) long and 6–10 cm (2 1/4–4 in) broad and are densely hairy on the veins underneath, with the upper surface hairless. The edible fruit is a 2–3 cm (3/4–1 1/4 in) long compound cluster of several drupes that are red when ripe.

It is considered by some authorities to be a variety or subspecies of white mulberry (M. alba) and is also similar to black mulberry (M. nigra).
