= Morus cathayana =

Conservation status
- Least Concern (IUCN 3.1)

Scientific classification
- Kingdom: Plantae
- Clade: Tracheophytes
- Clade: Angiosperms
- Clade: Eudicots
- Clade: Rosids
- Order: Rosales
- Family: Moraceae
- Genus: Morus
- Species: M. cathayana

Binomial name
- Morus cathayana Hemsl.

Species of plant

Morus cathayana or hua sang is a deciduous tree in the mulberry family Moraceae. It is native to China, Japan and Korea.

== Description ==
Morus cathayana is a deciduous tree usually found in secondary forest and scrubland. The tree reaches a height of up to 15 metres (49 feet) and flowers from May to June. It produces edible berries and its leaves are made into a tea.
