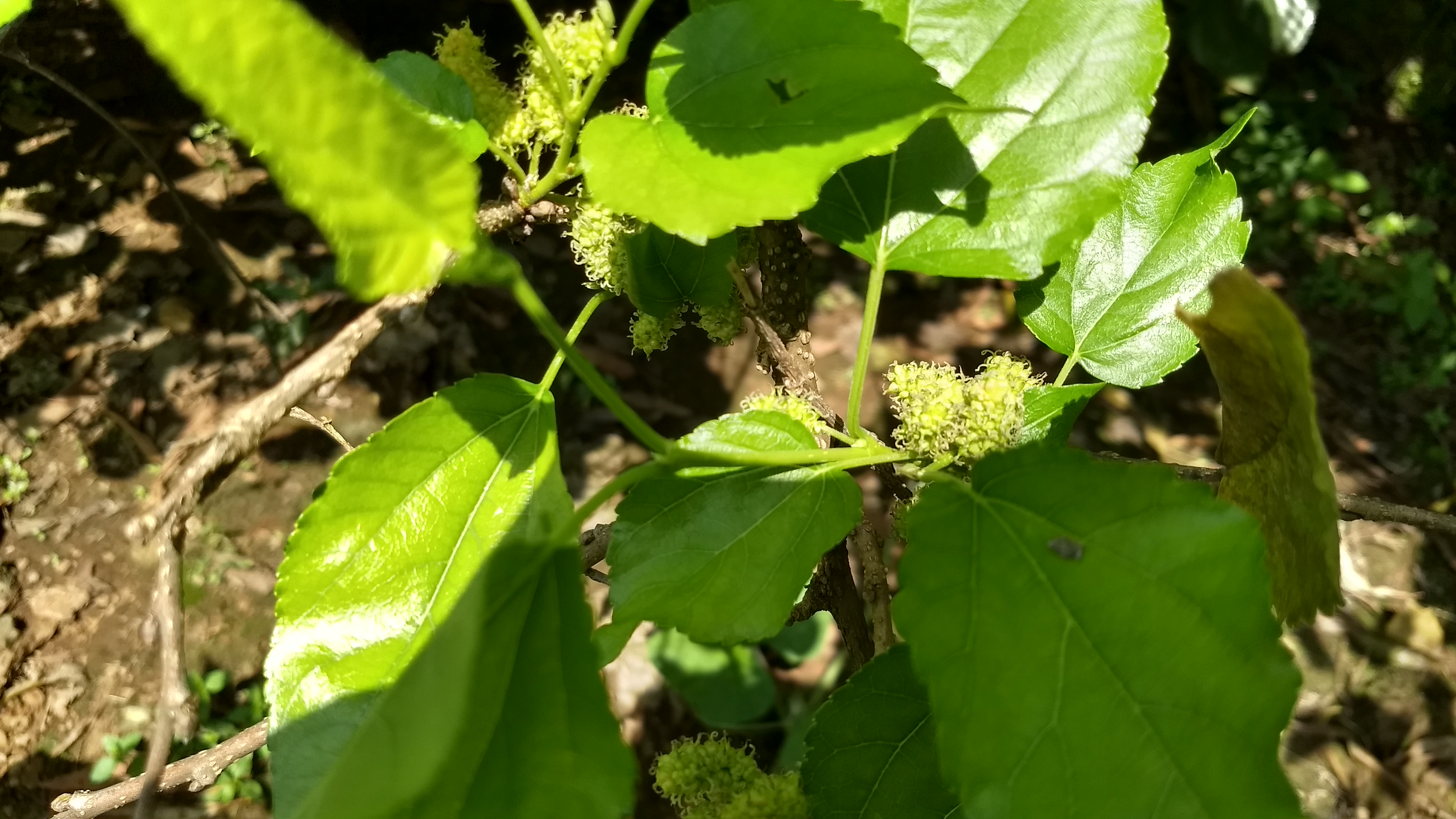
- With unripe berries

Conservation status
- Data Deficient (IUCN 3.1)

Scientific classification
- Kingdom: Plantae
- Clade: Embryophytes
- Clade: Tracheophytes
- Clade: Angiosperms
- Clade: Eudicots
- Clade: Rosids
- Order: Rosales
- Family: Moraceae
- Genus: Morus
- Species: M. indica

Binomial name
- Morus indica L.

Synonyms
- Morus alba var. indica (L.) Bureau; Morus alba var. latifolia (Poir.) Moretti; Morus cashmeriana Royle; Morus expansa Raf., nom. nud.; Morus laciniata Noronha, nom. nud.; Morus latifolia Poir.

= Morus indica =

Berry and plant

Morus indica is a species of flowering plant in the mulberry family Moraceae. As with other mulberries, it is a deciduous tree. Morus indica is native to the temperate and sub-tropical Himalayan region and Indochina, and is currently cultivated in India, China, Japan, and East Africa.

== Description ==
Morus indica, as with other members of the mulberry family, is often described as either a small tree or a shrub, rarely exceeding 10–15 metres (33–49 feet). When young, the branches are covered in fine, soft hairs; however, the plant loses these hairs as they mature. The branches are a light gray-brown color.

The leaves range from 4–12.5 centimetres (1 1/2–5 inches) long and 2.5–7.5 cm (1–3 in) wide, and are attached to the tree via petioles. The leaves themselves are usually ovate but sometimes lobed, coming to a narrow point, making them somewhere between caudate and acuminate. The leaves are retuse to slightly cordate, having a small lobe at the base. They are shortly serrated, with each tooth narrowing to a thin point, making them apiculate. The leaf colour is dark green, with a paler underside covered in fine hairs.

=== Flowers and fruit ===
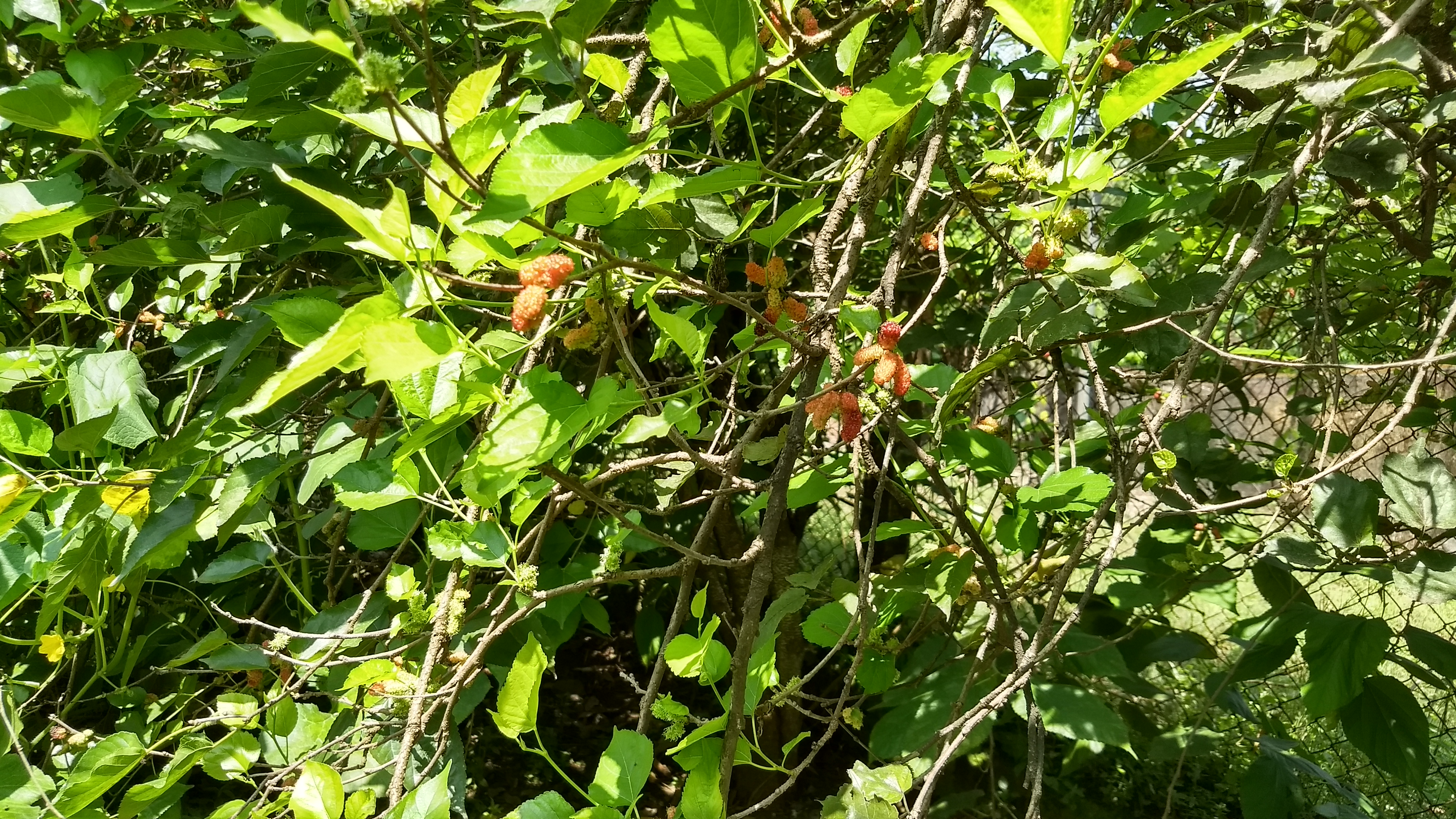
Plant with fruit nearing maturity

Morus indica is a monoecious flowering plant, having male and female flowers growing on the same tree, although often on distinct branches. The male inflorescence is narrow, between 9–11.5 millimetres (3/8–7/16 in) long, and covered in fine hairs. The female flowers are subglubose, or just shy of spherical. They measure 6–9.5 mm (1/4–3/8 in) long. The stigma of these flowers is about 3.5 mm long with dense, short hair.

The female flower, after being fertilized, forms a fleshy compound fruit known as a syncarp. This syncarp, which is black when fully ripe, looks like that of Morus nigra, commonly known as a black mulberry.

== Uses and health ==
Morus indica is often grown for its medicinal properties. As with most berries, the mulberries of M. indica have potent antioxidant properties. The primary medicinal use of M. indica is as a method of regulating blood glucose levels in diabetic patients. Multiple studies in humans and mice have found that the use of M. indica lowered the blood glucose levels of diabetic through multiple different pathways.
