= The Mulberry Tree (Van Gogh) =

Painting by Vincent van Gogh

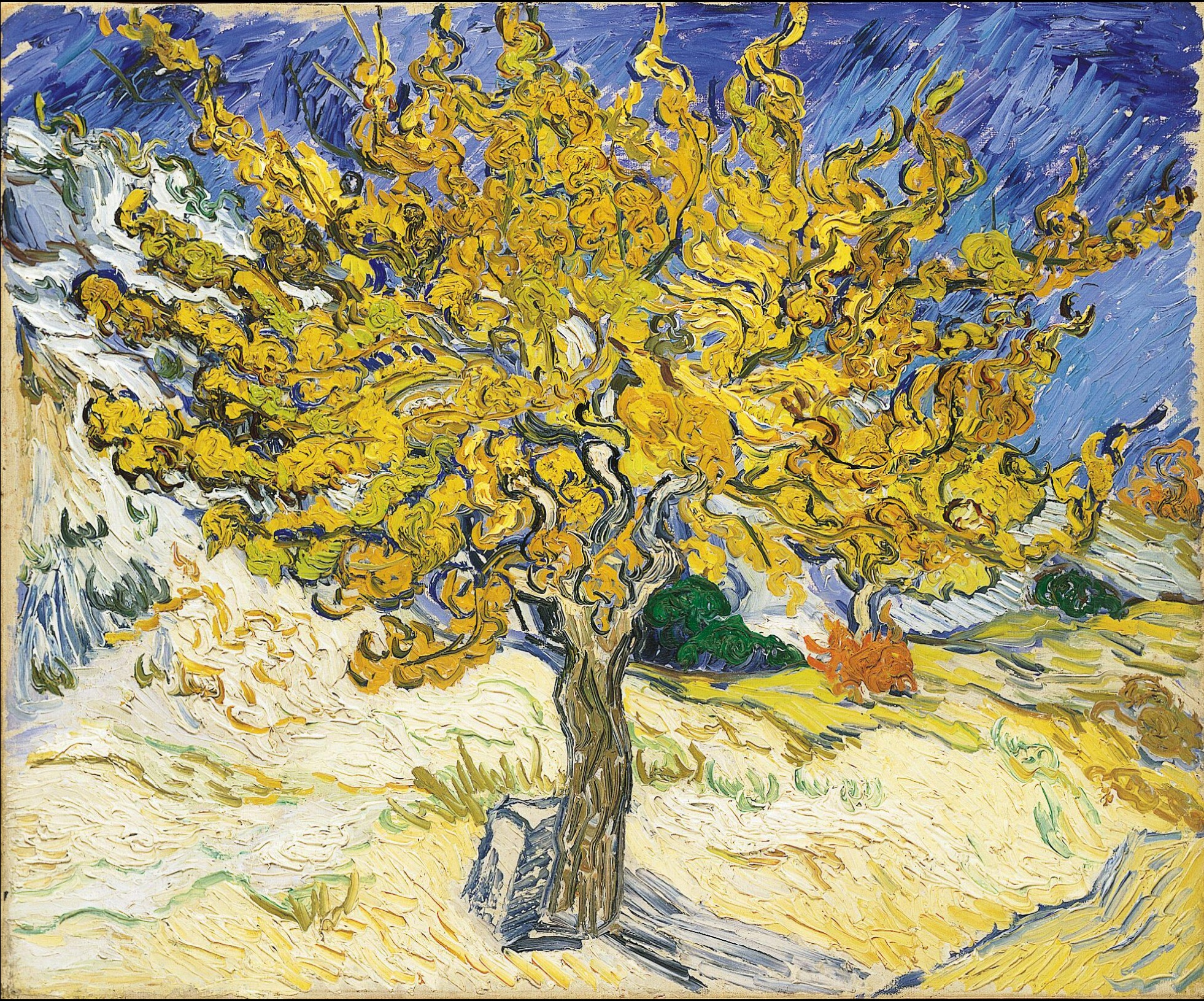
- Artist: Vincent van Gogh
- Year: October 1889
- Catalogue: F637, JH1796
- Medium: Oil on canvas
- Dimensions: 54 cm × 65 cm (21.2 in × 25.5 in)
- Location: Norton Simon Museum, Pasadena, California
- Owner: Norton Simon Art Foundation, Gift of Mr. Norton Simon
- Accession: M.1976.09.P
- Website: https://www.nortonsimon.org/art/detail/M.1976.09.P

The Mulberry Tree is an oil painting by Vincent van Gogh, a Dutch artist. The painting was created in October 1889. The Mulberry Tree is one of several hundred paintings from a series of paintings that van Gogh painted during this time at the Saint Paul-de-Mausole asylum in Saint-Rémy-de-Provence, France, in the last year before his death in 1890. It has been in the permanent collection of the Norton Simon Museum in Pasadena, California since 1976.

The painting features a vibrant depiction of a solitary symmetrical mulberry tree in autumn, which sits in the centre of the canvas. The tree grows from a rocky bare hillside, its swirling yellow and orange foliage set against a blue sky. The thick, expressive brushstrokes follows van Gogh's signature characteristic use of impasto techniques. His heavy application of paint makes the work appear almost three dimensional. Van Gogh's use of curling spirals of orange and black in the foliage brings a dynamic energy to the scene, almost as if the branches were moving in a strong wind. A striking visual effect is created by the contrast between the warm yellows and oranges of the tree and the cool blues and purples of the sky. Painted while in the asylum at Saint-Rémy-de-Provence, this work demonstrates van Gogh's ability to find beauty and vitality in nature during a turbulent period in his life.

== Background ==
On 8 May 1889, van Gogh voluntarily entered the asylum Saint Paul-de-Mausole, where, over the course of the year, he painted some 150 canvases. During his stay in hospital, Vincent painted landscapes and continued to study the effects of colour. During the first few months of his orderly life in the hospital, the painter had a positive effect. In the first week of October, Vincent painted several paintings, including The Mulberry Tree, The Reaper and Entrance to a Quarry. He also made a painting of the trees in the courtyard, of which he seemed proud; he wrote, "I have two views of the gardens and the asylum in which this place looks very attractive. I’ve tried to reconstruct it as it might have been, simplifying and accentuating the proud, unchanging nature of the pine trees and the clumps of cedar against the blue." In a letter to his brother, Theo, van Gogh described his delight in capturing the season's essence: "I’ll tell you that we’re having some superb autumn days, and that I’m taking advantage of them."

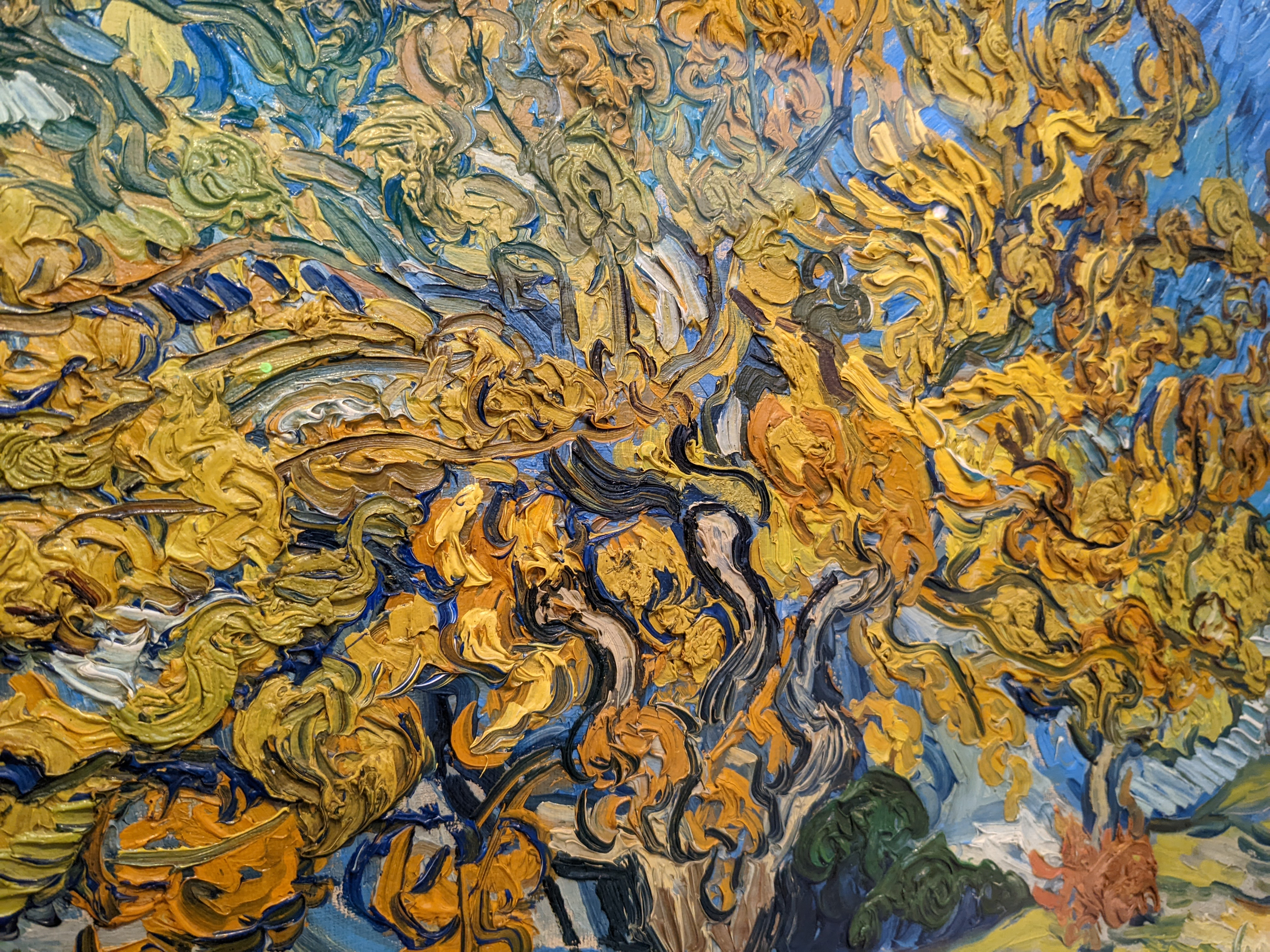
Close up detail of impasto technique used in The Mulberry Tree

When van Gogh painted the solitary mulberry tree - not much bigger than a shrub - orange and red, with foliage filling an entire canvas. Vincent experimented with all the styles of the past, from the thin paint and loose texture of Paris to the sculptural impasto of Monticelli; from the swarms of Impressionist brushstrokes to the plates of Japanese paint. Throughout certain parts of the canvas he applied paint with the lightest touch possible - mere glances of hue - to show the falling of leaves; then in different sections he loaded his brush with spades of pigment to paint the serpentine web of bare tree limbs left behind.

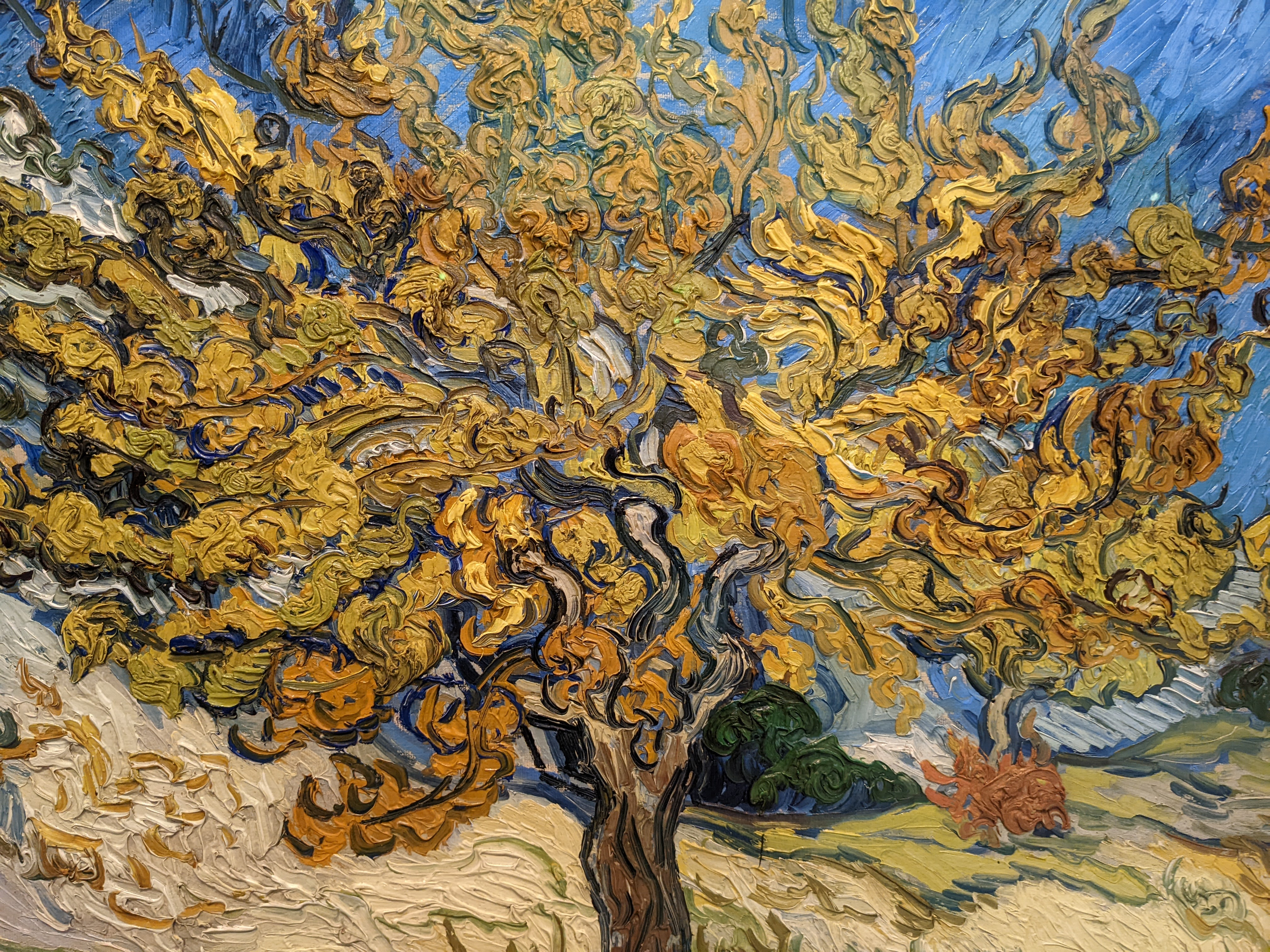
Detail of the impasto technique in The Mulberry Tree

Vincent found a deep connection with the expressive qualities of trees. He would view them with human characteristics. This idea is captured in a letter Vincent wrote to Theo: "Those trees, they were superb, there was a drama in each figure I’m tempted to say, but I mean in each tree." Vincent wrote to Theo in 1881 about the same sense of similarity between trees and figures: "If we don’t draw figures, or else trees as though they were figures, then we’re like people who have no spine, or at least one that’s too weak." ref??

During his year in the asylum, between some debilitating attacks, he averaged two paintings a week, along with detailed descriptions in letters to Theo about his progress.

On 7 December 1889, van Gogh wrote to Theo describing the contents of three packages sent by parcel post containing various works of art, including The Mulberry Tree, of which van Gogh wrote: "The remainder is above all autumn studies and I think the best one is the yellow mulberry tree against a very blue sky."

Van Gogh wrote to his sister Willemien van Gogh on 9 or 10 December 1889, describing the tree he had painted; "the garden too, with its espalier mulberry tree. As regards mulberry trees, there are a lot here. I painted one not long ago when its bushy foliage was a magnificent yellow against a very blue sky and a white, stony, sunlit field behind."

== Interpretations ==
The work was exhibited at the Bernheim-Jeune in Paris in 1901. Hugo von Hofmannsthal, an Austrian visionary poet, recounted his visit in the form of a fictitious letter titled "Colors". He wrote about the sixty or so paintings, that were mostly landscapes where only few were the most important pictoral element. Hofmannsthal did not write about the style of the paintings, but he did note that he often saw paintings that resembled them. He went on to write more about his experience: "First they seemed to coarse and shrill in color tones, agitated and quite strange; ... then I saw them all that way, each one individually, and all of them together, and Nature in them, and the strength of the human soul that had been at work here, shaping Nature, and tree and bush, and field ... and in addition, something else, that which was 'behind' the painted surface, the true reality, the indescribably fateful-all this I perceived in such a way as to lose my self-awareness while looking at these pictures."

On 24 April 1892, Charles Saunier, who wrote on French nineteenth- and twentieth-century arts. Wrote in L'endehors in a piece titled "Vincent van Gogh". Saunier noted that van Gogh's technique was complex and that "[van Gogh] often proceeded by flat tints, occasionally by divided tones". He went on to write, "The extraordinary Mulberry Tree is sculpted in a thick layer of cobalt and chrome yellow. This painter loved light and color and desired a simple art." Saunier emphasized van Gogh's ability to create a "complex, wholly intellectual art", that conveyed a sense of cheerfulness throughout his "Auvers orchards".

== Provenance ==
- Camille Pissarro, Paris, until 1890, by inheritance to;
- Madame C. Pissarro, Paris;
- Ambroise Vollard, Paris.
- Alphonse Kann (1870–1948), Saint Germain-en-Laye, until 1928, still in 1934, probably by inheritance to;
- Michael Stewart, London.
- David Gibbs, London and New York, sold on 19 October 1961 to; Marlborough Fine Art, Ltd.
- Marlborough Fine Art, Ltd, London, sold on 12 November 1961 to; Norton Simon
- Norton Simon, Gift 1976 to; Norton Simon Art Foundation.

== See also ==
- List of works by Vincent van Gogh
- Saint-Paul Asylum, Saint-Rémy (van Gogh series)
