= Morus (plant) =

Mulberry
- Morus nigra

Scientific classification
- Kingdom: Plantae
- Clade: Tracheophytes
- Clade: Angiosperms
- Clade: Eudicots
- Clade: Rosids
- Order: Rosales
- Family: Moraceae
- Tribe: Moreae
- Genus: Morus; L.

Type species
- Morus nigra L.

Species
- See text

Genus of plants

Morus is a genus of flowering plants in the family Moraceae, consisting of 17 species of deciduous trees commonly known as mulberries, growing wild and under cultivation in many warm-temperate world regions. Generally, the genus has 64 subordinate taxa; although the three of most common are referred to as white, red, and black, originating from the colour of their dormant buds, and not necessarily the fruit colour (Morus alba, M. rubra, and M. nigra, respectively), with numerous cultivars and some taxa currently unchecked and awaiting taxonomic scrutiny. Morus alba is native to China, but is widely cultivated and often naturalised across Europe, Southern Africa, South America, and North America; it is also the species most preferred by the silkworm. It is regarded as an invasive species in Brazil, the United States and some states of Australia.

Species in the closely related genus Broussonetia are also commonly known as mulberries, notably the paper mulberry (Broussonetia papyrifera).

Despite their similar appearance, mulberries are not closely related to raspberries or blackberries. All three species belong to the order Rosales, but while the mulberry is a tree belonging to the family Moraceae (also including the fig, jackfruit, and other fruits), raspberries and blackberries are brambles and belong to the family Rosaceae.

== Description ==
Mulberries are fast-growing when young, and can grow to 24 metres (79 feet) tall. The leaves are alternately arranged, simple, and often lobed and serrated on the margin. Lobes are more common on juvenile shoots than on mature trees. The trees can be monoecious or dioecious.

The mulberry fruit is a multiple fruit, about 2–3 centimetres (3/4–1 1/4 inches) long. The immature fruit are white, green, or pale yellow. The fruit turns from pink to red while ripening, then dark purple or black, and has a sweet flavour when fully ripe.

Mulberry identification is complex, with leaf shape (heavily dependent on age and vigour) and fruit colour being of no value. Leaf texture of the upper surface is more significant; the two most commonly cultivated species across Europe, M. nigra and M. alba, are easily distinguished by the matt, rough-textured leaves of M. nigra, and the smooth, glossy leaves of M. alba. In North America, M. rubra also has rough leaves, but is distinguished by the leaves being downy on the undersides.

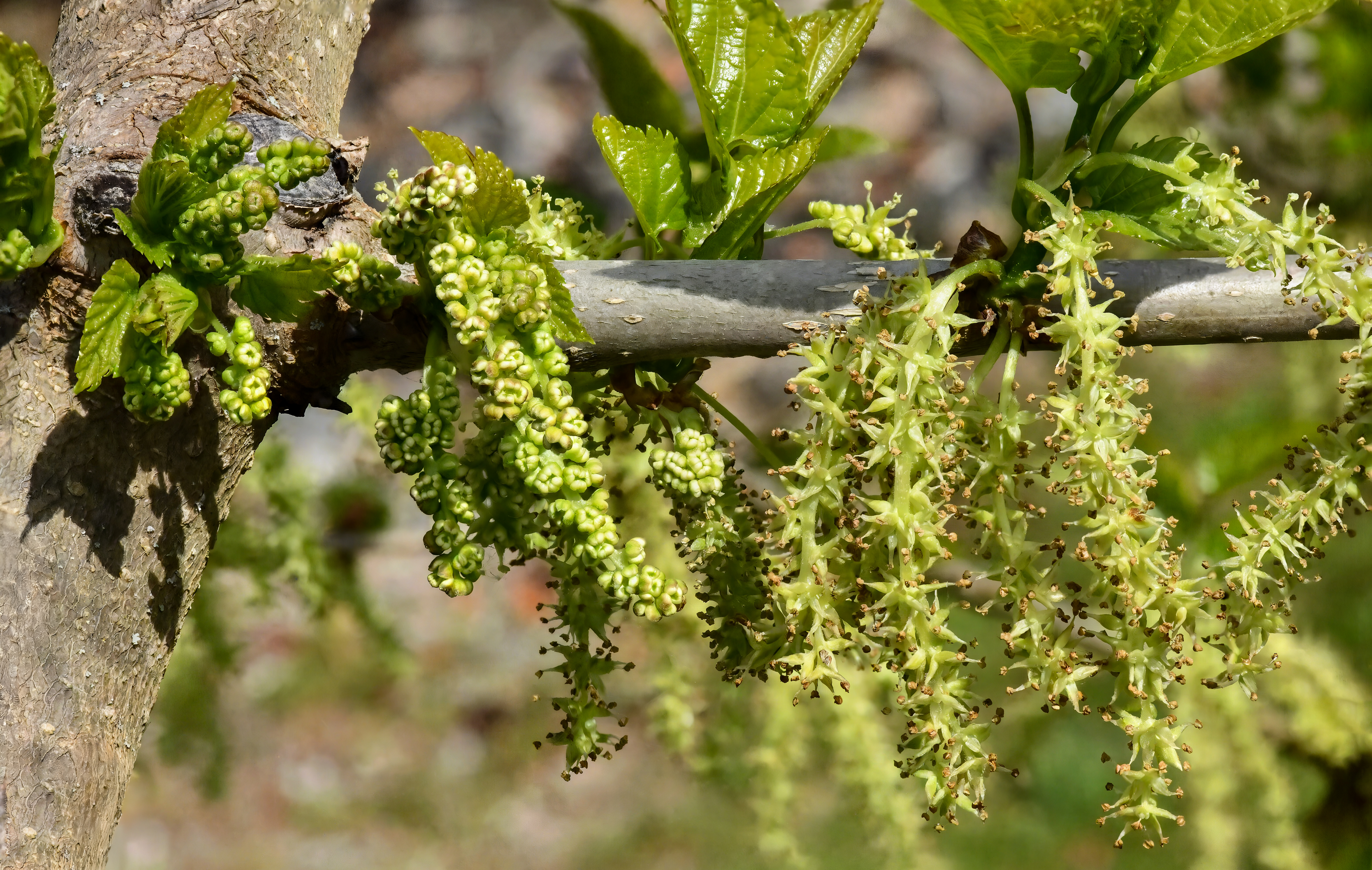
Clusters (inflorescences) of unopened male flower buds

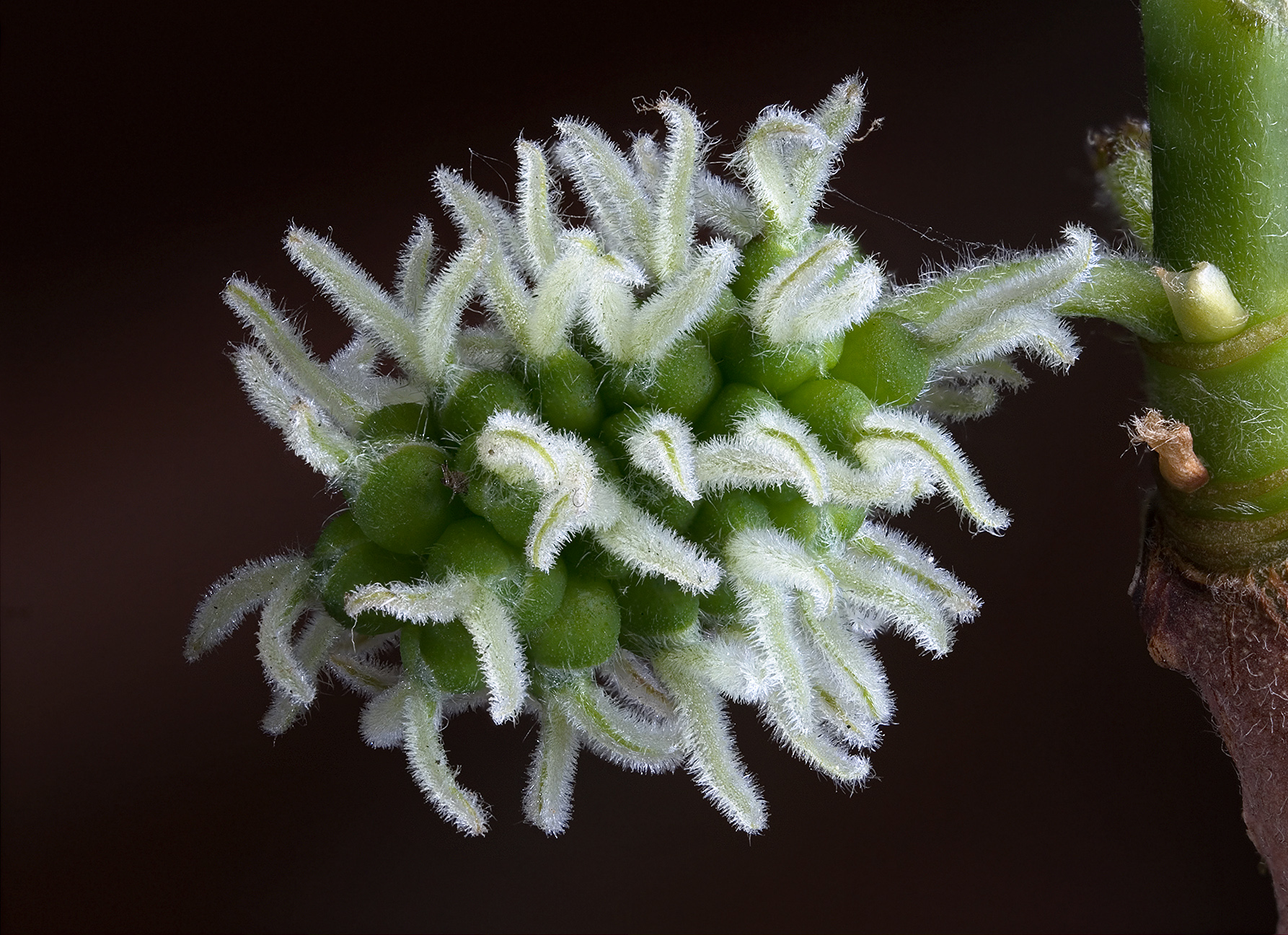
Female catkins

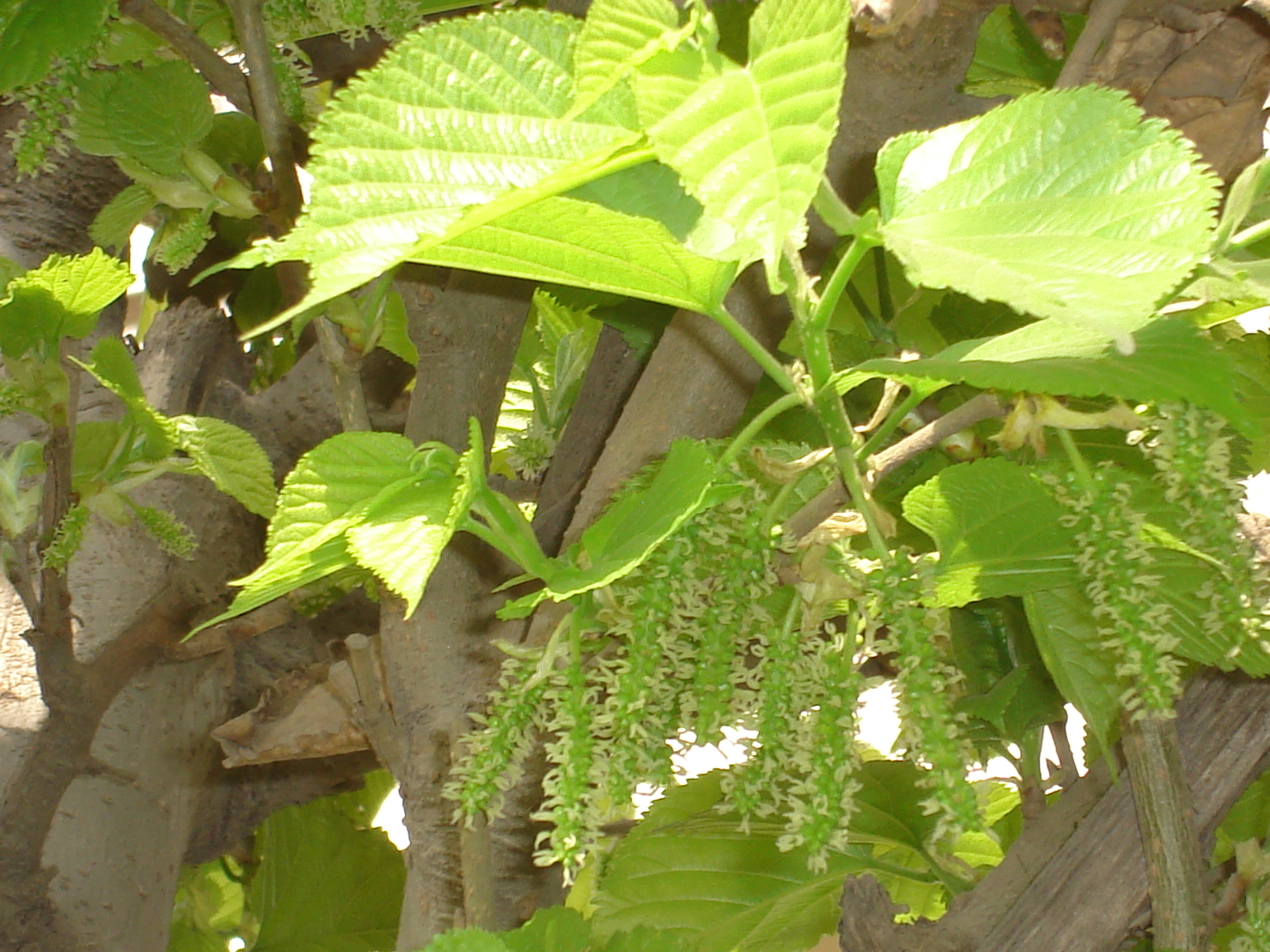
Young mulberry fruit clusters

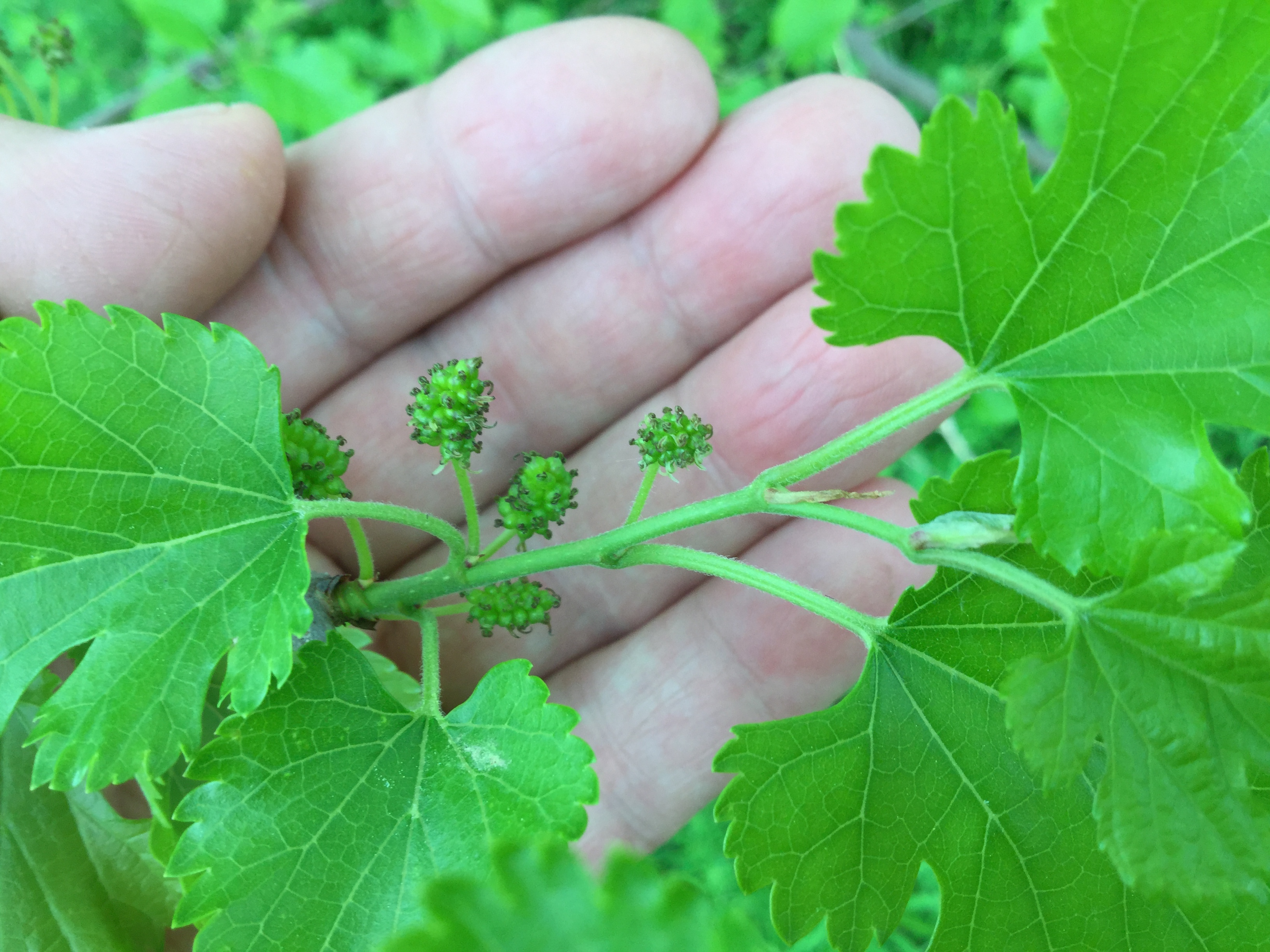
Immature fruit

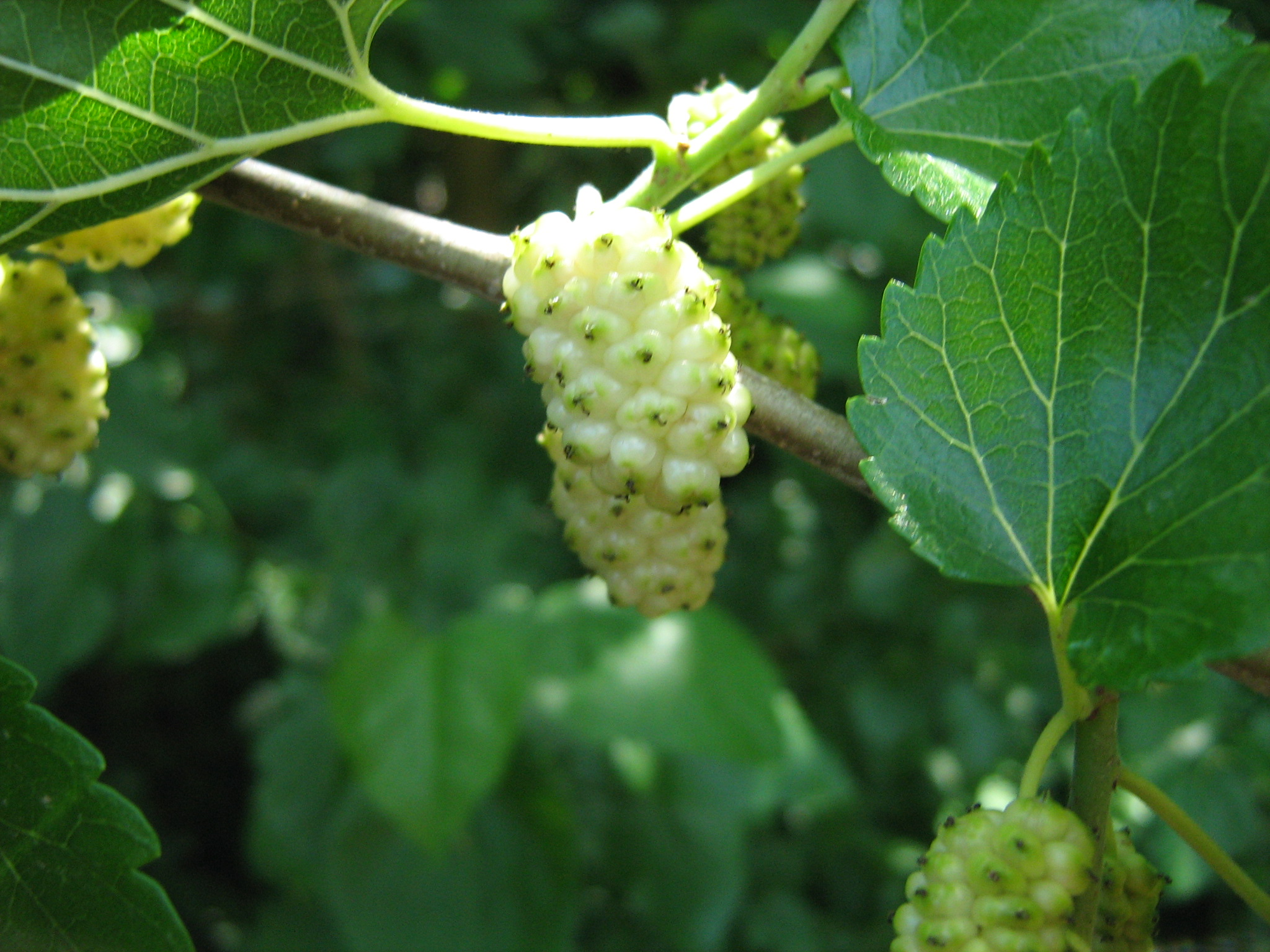
Unripe white mulberries

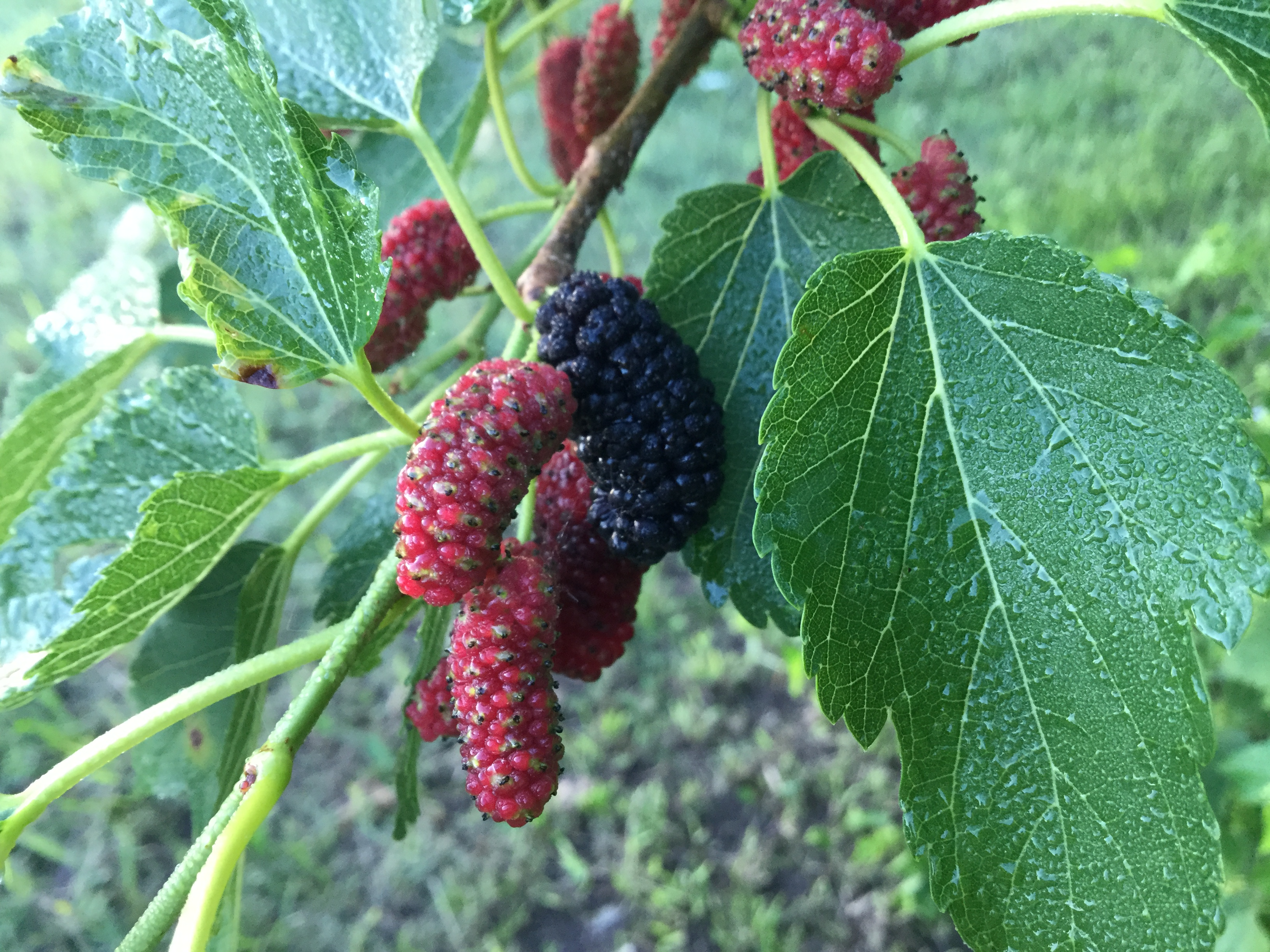
Berries on branches in Eastern Oklahoma

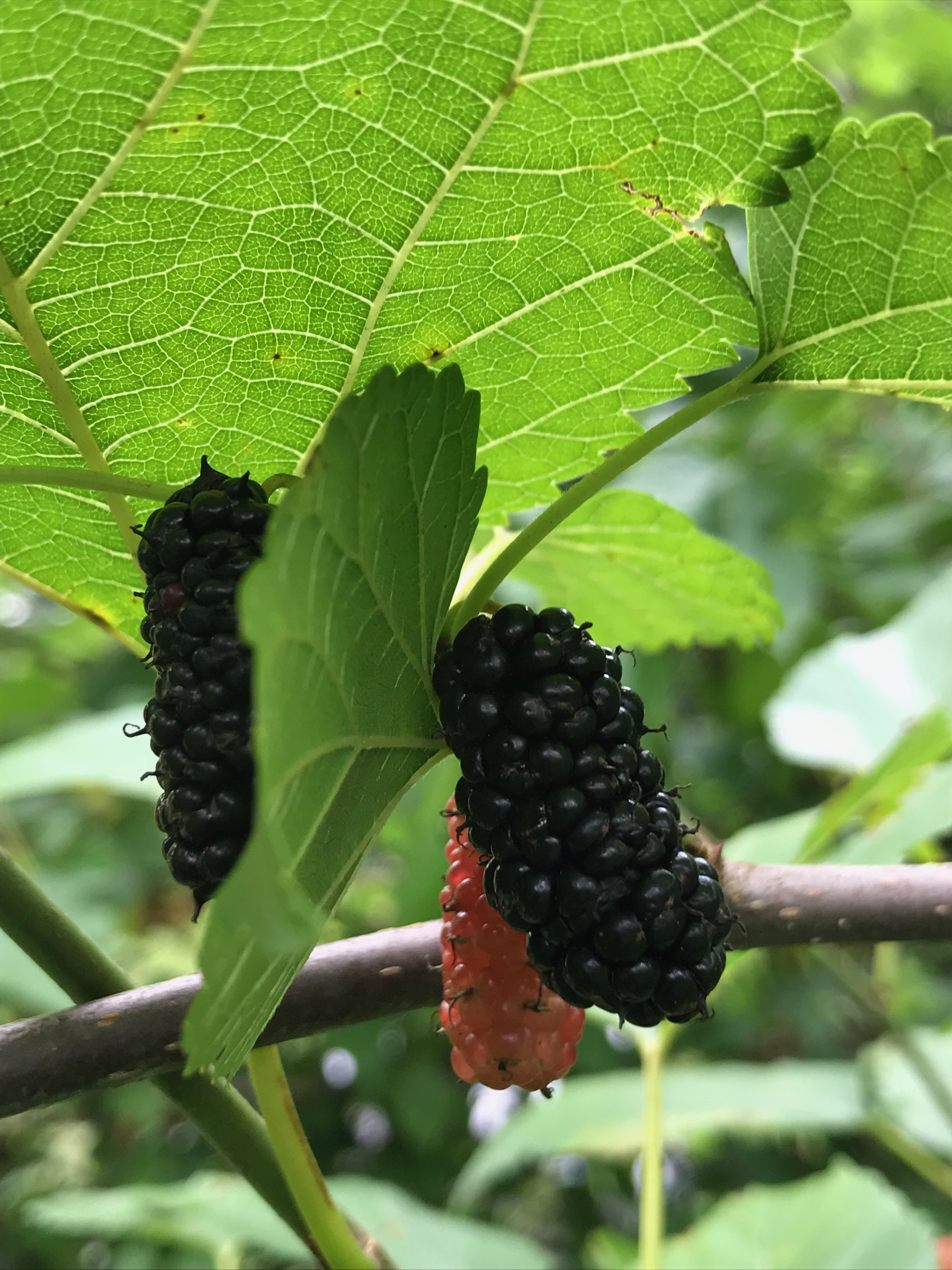
Mulberry in southern Brazil

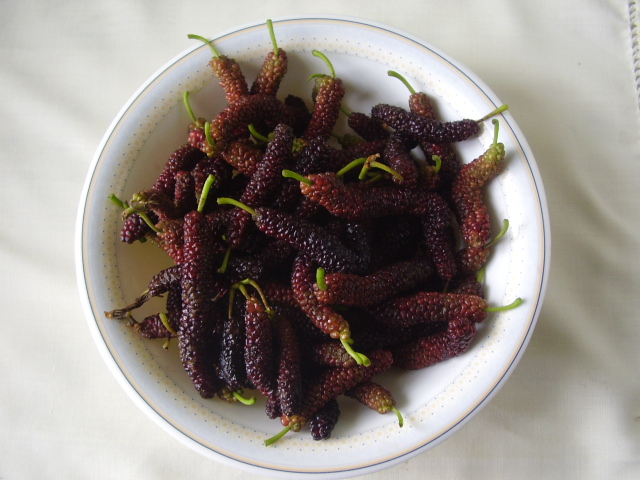
Long mulberry

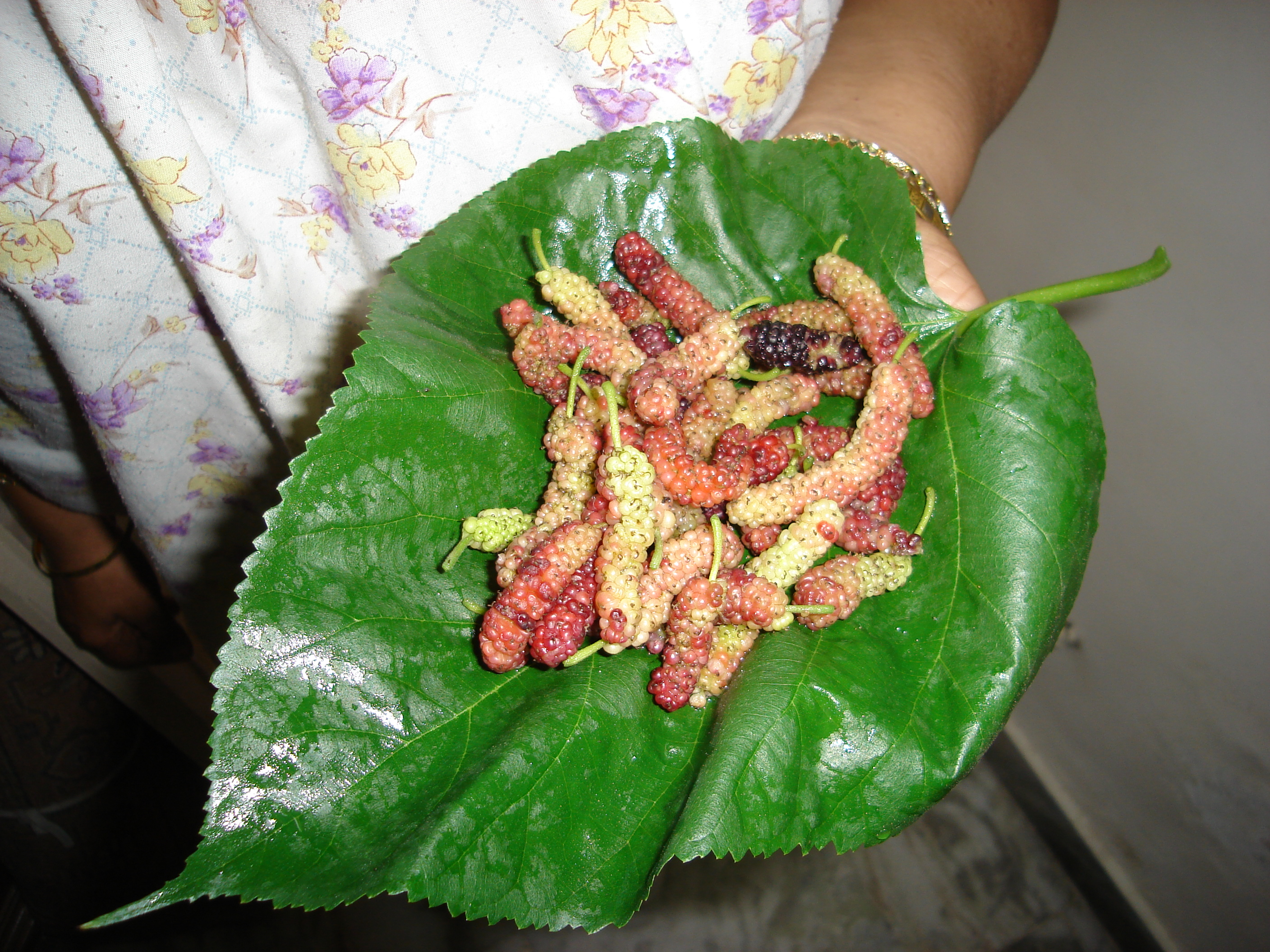
Semi-ripe mulberries on a mulberry leaf

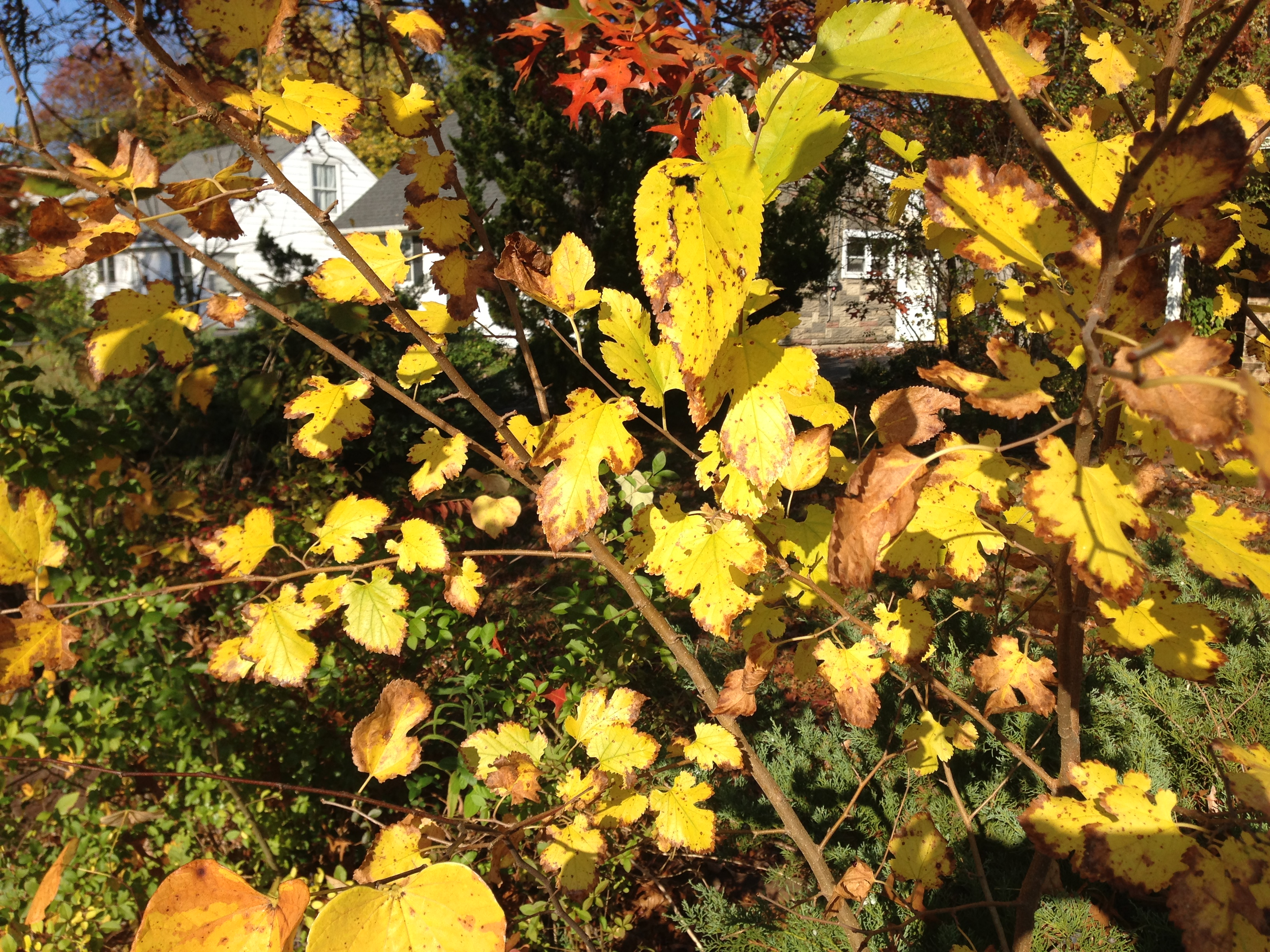
Autumn foliage

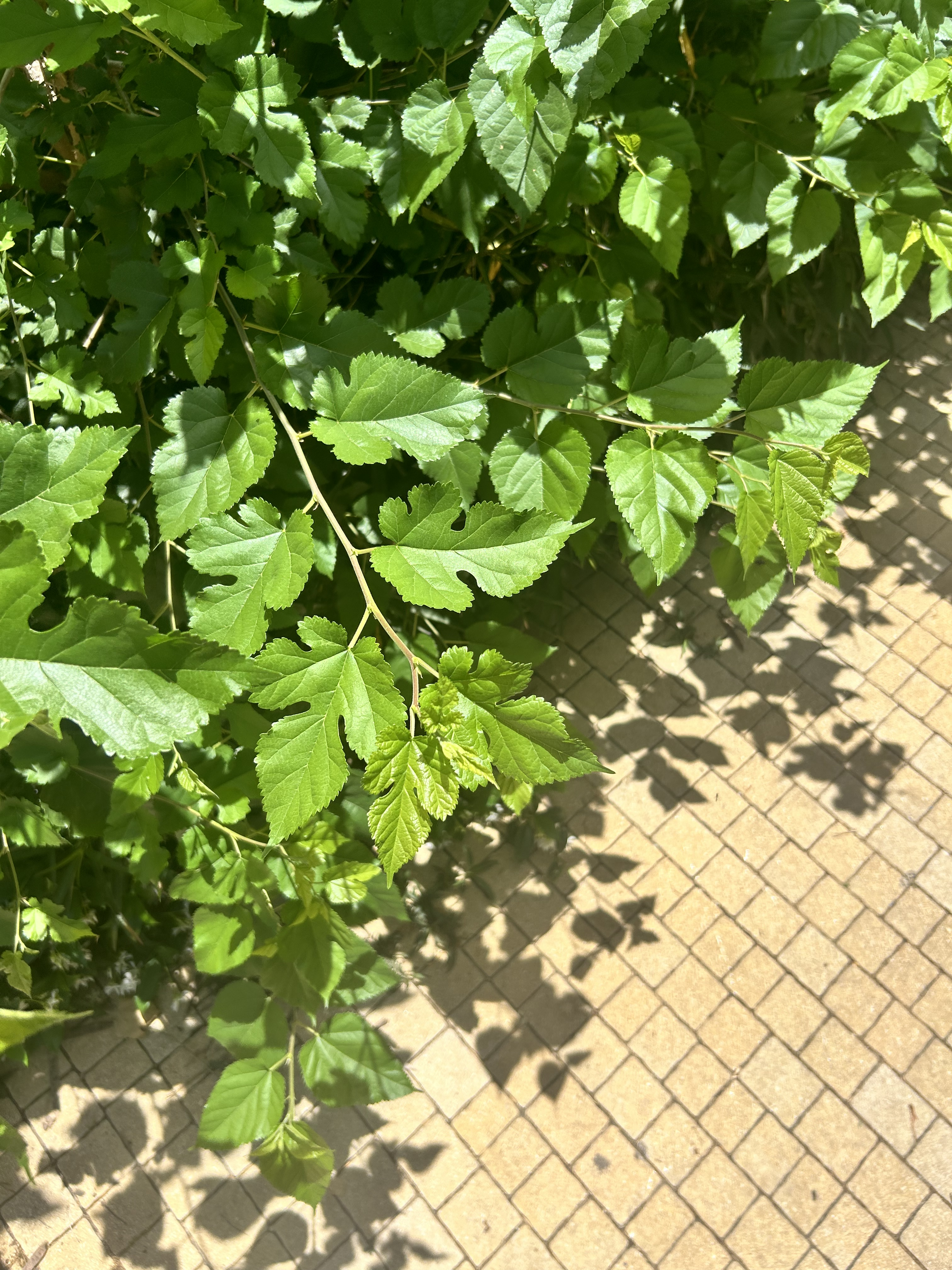
Mulberry leaves in Ness Ziona, Israel. Diversity in shape visible.

== Taxonomy ==
The taxonomy of Morus is complex and disputed. Fossils of Morus appear in the Pliocene record of the Netherlands. Over 150 species names have been published, and although differing sources may cite different selections of accepted names, fewer than 20 are accepted by the vast majority of botanical authorities. Morus classification is further complicated by widespread hybridisation between some species, wherein the hybrids are fertile. Recent chromosome-level genome assemblies have been published for several Morus species, including Morus alba, Morus atropurpurea, Morus notabilis, and Morus macroura, providing comparative genomic resources for the genus.

The following species are accepted:

- Morus alba L. – white mulberry (China, Korea, Japan)
- Morus australis Poir. – Korean mulberry or Chinese mulberry (East and Southeast Asia)
- Morus boninensis Koidz.
- Morus cathayana Hemsl. – hua sang (China, Japan, Korea)
- Morus celtidifolia Kunth – Texas mulberry (southwestern United States, Mexico, Central America, South America)
- Morus indica L. – India, Southeast Asia
- Morus koordersiana J.-F.Leroy
- Morus liboensis S.S.Chang – Guizhou Province in China
- Morus macroura Miq. – long mulberry (Tibet, Himalayas, Indochina)
- Morus microphylla Buckley
- Morus miyabeana Hotta
- Morus mongolica (Bureau) C.K.Schneid. – Mongolian mulberry
- Morus nigra L. – black mulberry (Iran, Caucasus, Levant)
- Morus notabilis C.K.Schneid. – Yunnan and Sichuan Provinces in China
- Morus rubra L. – red mulberry (eastern North America)
- Morus serrata Roxb. – Himalayan mulberry (Tibet, Nepal, northwestern India)
- Morus trilobata (S.S.Chang) Z.Y.Cao – Guizhou Province in China

== Distribution ==
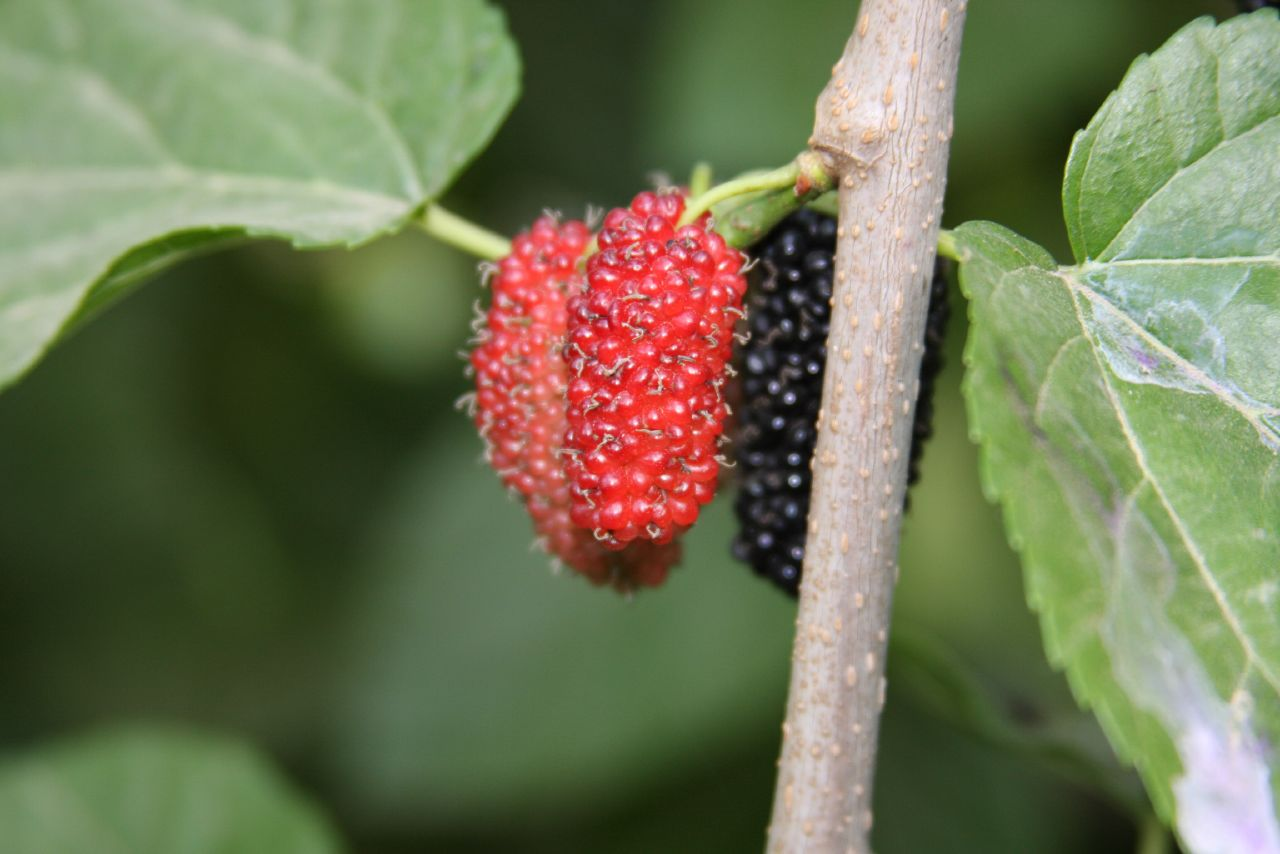
Mulberry fruit in Libya

The genus is widespread in warm temperate to tropical regions of Asia, eastern and southern North America, and northwestern South America.

Black and white mulberries are widespread in cultivation in Southern Europe, the Middle East, Central Asia, Northern Africa, and the Indian subcontinent, where the tree and the fruit have names under regional dialects.

Black mulberry was imported to Britain in the 17th century in the hopes that it would be useful in the cultivation of silkworms. It was much used in folk medicine, especially in the treatment of tapeworms.

The United States has native red mulberries, as well as imported black and white mulberries. In North America, the white mulberry is considered an invasive exotic and has taken over extensive tracts from native plant species, including the red mulberry.

Mulberries are also widespread in Greece, particularly in the Peloponnese, which in the Middle Ages was known as Morea, deriving from the Greek word for the tree (μουριά, mouria).

Australia has two types of native mulberries: Hedycarya angustifolia, and Pipturus argenteus, which are both from different families to Moraceae. The exotic black, red and white Morus mulberries are also commonly grown in Australian backyards. White mulberry is considered an environmental weed in the states of Queensland and New South Wales.

== Cultivation ==
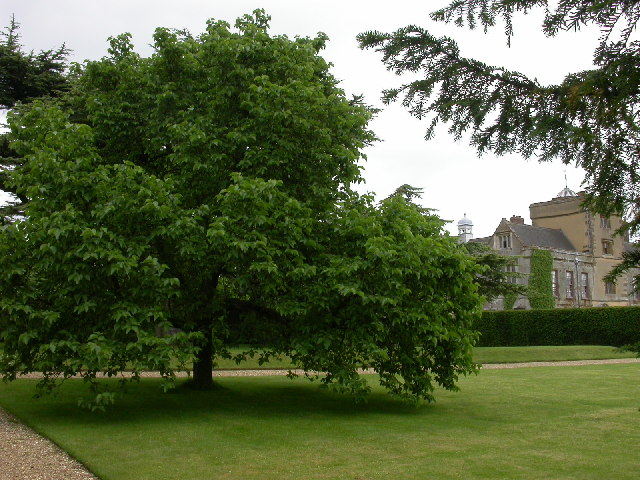
A mulberry tree in England

Mulberries can be grown from seed, and this is often advised, as seedling-grown trees are generally of better shape and health. Mulberry trees grown from seed can take up to ten years to bear fruit. Mulberries are most often planted from large cuttings, which root readily. The mulberry plants allowed to grow tall have a crown height of 1.5 to 1.8 m (5 to 6 ft) from ground level and a stem girth of 10–13 cm (4–5 in). They are specially raised with the help of well-grown saplings 8–10 months old of any of the varieties recommended for rainfed areas like S-13 (for red loamy soil) or S-34 (black cotton soil), which are tolerant to drought or soil-moisture stress conditions. Usually, the plantation is raised and in block formation with a spacing of 1.8 by 1.8 m (6 by 6 ft), or 2.4 by 2.4 m (8 by 8 ft), as plant-to-plant and row-to-row distances. The plants are usually pruned once a year during the monsoon season to a height of 1.5–1.8 m (5–6 ft) and allowed to grow with a maximum of 8–10 shoots at the crown.

Mulberry tree scion wood can easily be grafted onto other mulberry trees during the winter, when the tree is dormant. One common scenario is converting a problematic male mulberry tree to an allergy-free female tree, by grafting all-female mulberry tree scions to a male mulberry that has been pruned back to the trunk. However, any new growth from below the graft(s) must be removed, as they would be from the original male mulberry tree.

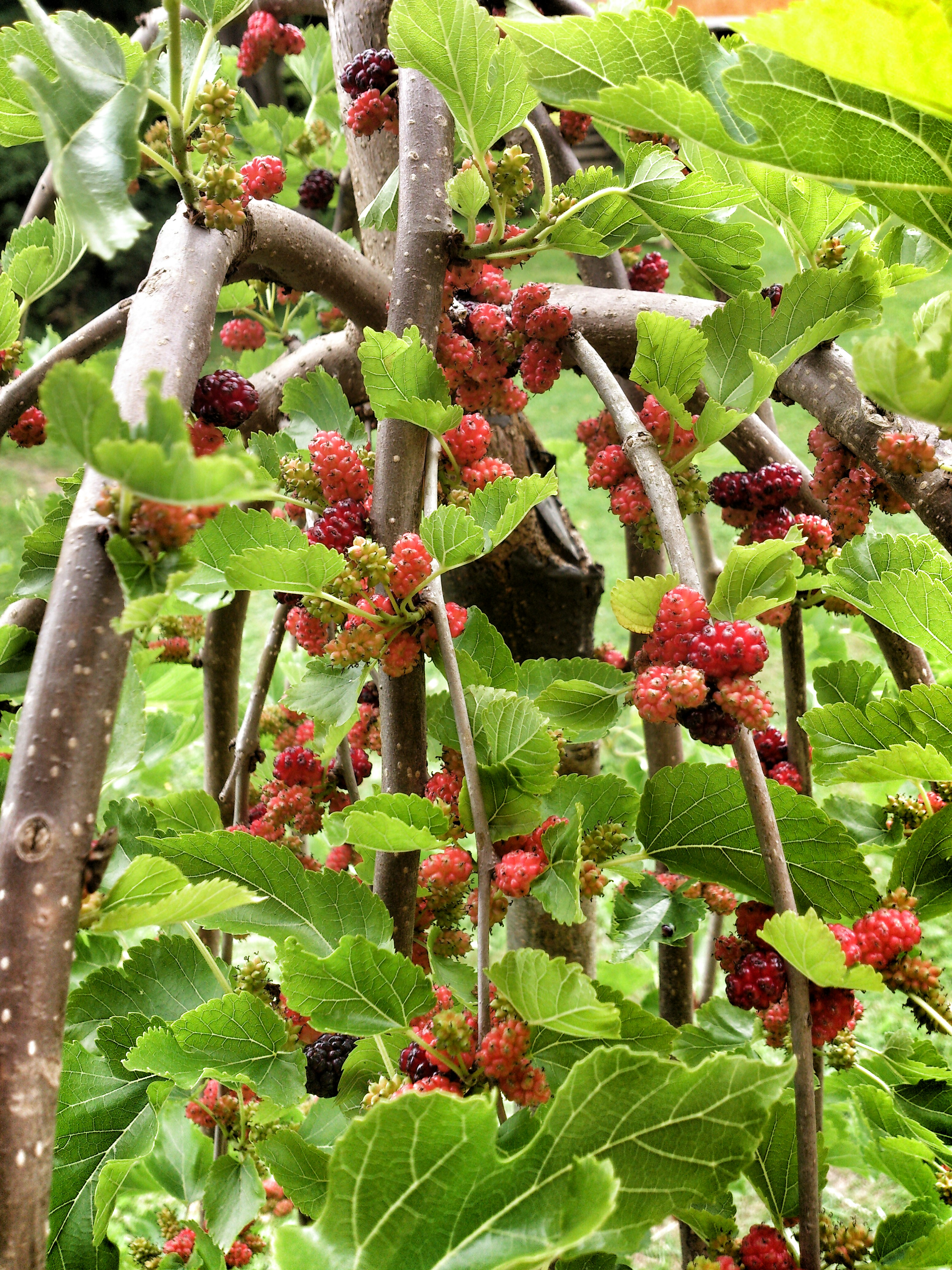
M. alba 'Pendula', a weeping variety of mulberry, producing fruit.

Many selections of Morus have been cultivated for their fruit. These selections come from multiple species, mainly M. alba, M. macroura, M. nigra, M. rubra, and their various hybrids. They are able to grow in a wide variety of conditions and climates. Varieties include:

- M. nigra 'Chelsea'
- M. alba 'Galicia'
- M. rubra × M. alba 'Illinois Everbearing'
- M. nigra 'Jerusalem'
- M. macroura 'Pakistan'
- M. rubra × M. alba 'Shangri-La'
- M. alba 'Shelli'
- M. rubra × M. alba 'Silk Hope'
- M. alba 'Thai Dwarf'

== Toxicity and allergenicity ==
All parts of the plant besides the ripe fruit can exude a milky sap (latex) which is mildly toxic if ingested, causing digestive distress and, at larger doses, hallucinations. It is also an irritant and may cause a skin rash on contact. Unripe green fruit may cause nausea, cramps, and be hallucinogenic. The berries have a laxative effect; too many will cause diarrhea.

Some North American cities have banned the planting of mulberries because of the large amounts of pollen they produce, posing a potential health hazard for some pollen allergy sufferers. Only the male mulberry trees produce pollen; this lightweight pollen can be inhaled deeply into the lungs, sometimes triggering asthma. Conversely, female mulberry trees produce all-female flowers, which draw pollen and dust from the air. Because of this pollen-absorbing feature, all-female mulberry trees have an OPALS allergy scale rating of just 1 (lowest level of allergy potential), and some consider it "allergy-free".

== Nutrition ==
Raw mulberries
Nutritional value per 100 g (3.5 oz)
- Energy: 180 kJ (43 kcal)
- Carbohydrates: 9.8
- Sugars: 8.1
- Dietary fibre: 1.7
- Fat: 0.39
- Protein: 1.44
Vitamins and minerals
Vitamins	Quantity %DV^{†}
Vitamin A equiv.	0% 1 μg
Thiamine (B1)	2% 0.029 mg
Riboflavin (B2)	8% 0.101 mg
Niacin (B3)	4% 0.62 mg
Vitamin B6	3% 0.05 mg
Folate (B9)	2% 6 μg
Vitamin C	40% 36.4 mg
Vitamin E	6% 0.87 mg
Vitamin K	7% 7.8 μg
Minerals	Quantity %DV^{†}
Calcium	3% 39 mg
Iron	10% 1.85 mg
Magnesium	4% 18 mg
Phosphorus	3% 38 mg
Potassium	6% 194 mg
Sodium	0% 10 mg
Zinc	1% 0.12 mg
- Other constituents: Quantity
- Water: 87.68 g
- US Department of Agriculture FoodData Central entry
- ^{†}Percentages estimated using US recommendations for adults, except for potassium, which is estimated based on expert recommendation from the National Academies.

Raw mulberries are 88% water, 10% carbohydrates, 1% protein, and less than 1% fat. In a 100-gram (3.5-ounce) reference amount, raw mulberries provide 43 calories, 44% of the Daily Value (DV) for vitamin C, and 14% of the DV for iron; other micronutrients are insignificant in quantity.

== Uses ==
=== Agricultural ===
The leaves are harvested three or four times a year by a leaf-picking method under rain-fed or semi-arid conditions, depending on the monsoon. The leaves are useful as animal fodder. The tree branches pruned in the fall (autumn; after the leaves have fallen) are cut and used to make durable baskets supporting agriculture and animal husbandry.

=== Culinary ===
As the fruit matures, mulberries change in texture and colour, becoming succulent, plump, and juicy, resembling a blackberry. The colour of the fruit does not distinguish the mulberry species, as mulberries may be white, lavender or black. The fruit of the black mulberry (native to southwest Asia) and the red mulberry (native to eastern North America) have distinct flavours. White mulberry fruit are typically sweet, but not tart, while red mulberries are usually deep red, sweet, and juicy. Black mulberries are large and juicy, with balanced sweetness and tartness. The fruit of the East Asian white mulberry – a species extensively naturalised in urban regions of eastern North America – has a different flavour, sometimes characterised as refreshing and a little tart, with a bit of gumminess to it and a hint of vanilla.

Mulberries are used in pies, tarts, wines, cordials, and herbal teas. Jams and sherbets are often made from the fruit in the Old World. In spring, new tender twigs are semisweet and can be eaten raw or cooked.

In Armenia, mulberries are common, with wide usage in homemade oghi (moonshine) production, known as tti oghi, and syrup known as doshab.

=== Supplement ===
The fruit and leaves are sold in various forms as dietary supplements.

=== Silk industry ===
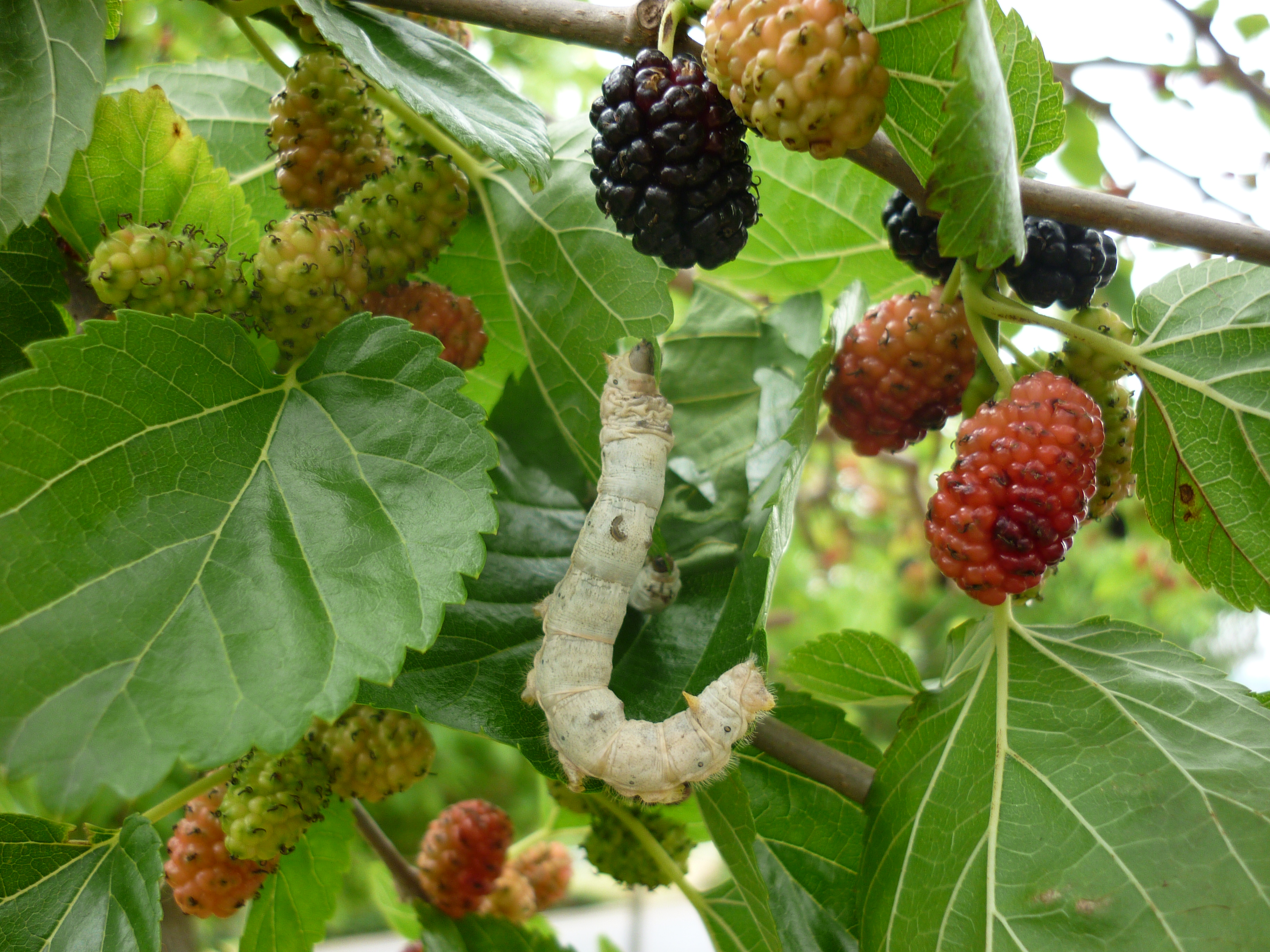
A silkworm, Bombyx mori, feeding on a mulberry tree

Mulberry leaves, particularly those of the white mulberry, are ecologically important as the sole food source of the silkworm (Bombyx mori, named after the mulberry genus Morus), the cocoon of which is used to make silk. The wild silk moth also eats mulberry. Other Lepidoptera larvae—which include the common emerald, lime hawk-moth, sycamore moth, and fall webworm—also eat the plant.

The Ancient Greeks and Romans cultivated the mulberry, albeit not for sericulture as they lacked the knowledge thereof. Nevertheless, they were able to obtain silk; at least as early as 220 AD, Emperor Elagabalus wore a silk robe. English clergy wore silk vestments from about 1500 onwards. Mulberry and the silk industry played a role in colonial Virginia.

=== Pigment ===
Mulberry fruit colour derives from anthocyanins, which have unknown effects in humans. Anthocyanins are responsible for the attractive colours of fresh plant foods, including orange, red, purple, black, and blue. These colours are water-soluble and easily extractable, yielding natural food colourants. Due to a growing demand for natural food colourants, they have numerous applications in the food industry.

A cheap and industrially feasible method has been developed to extract anthocyanins from mulberry fruit that could be used as a fabric dye or food colourant of high colour value. Scientists found that, of 31 Chinese mulberry cultivars tested, the total anthocyanin yield varied from 148 to 2725 mg/L of fruit juice. Sugars, acids, and vitamins of the fruit remained intact in the residual juice after removal of the anthocyanins, indicating that the juice may be used for other food products.

Mulberry germplasm resources may be used for:

- exploration and collection of fruit yielding mulberry species
- their characterization, cataloging, and evaluation for anthocyanin content by using traditional, as well as modern, means and biotechnology tools
- developing an information system about these cultivars and varieties
- training and global coordination of genetic stocks
- evolving suitable breeding strategies to improve the anthocyanin content in potential breeds by collaboration with various research stations in the field of sericulture, plant genetics, and breeding, biotechnology and pharmacology

=== Paper ===
During the Angkorian age of the Khmer Empire of Southeast Asia, monks at Buddhist temples made paper from the bark of mulberry trees. The paper was used to make books, known as kraing. Tengujo is the thinnest paper in the world. It is produced in Japan and made with kozo (stems of mulberry trees). Traditional Japanese washi paper is often created from parts of the mulberry tree.

=== Wood ===
The wood of mulberry trees is used for barrel aging of Țuică, a traditional Romanian plum brandy.

== Culture ==
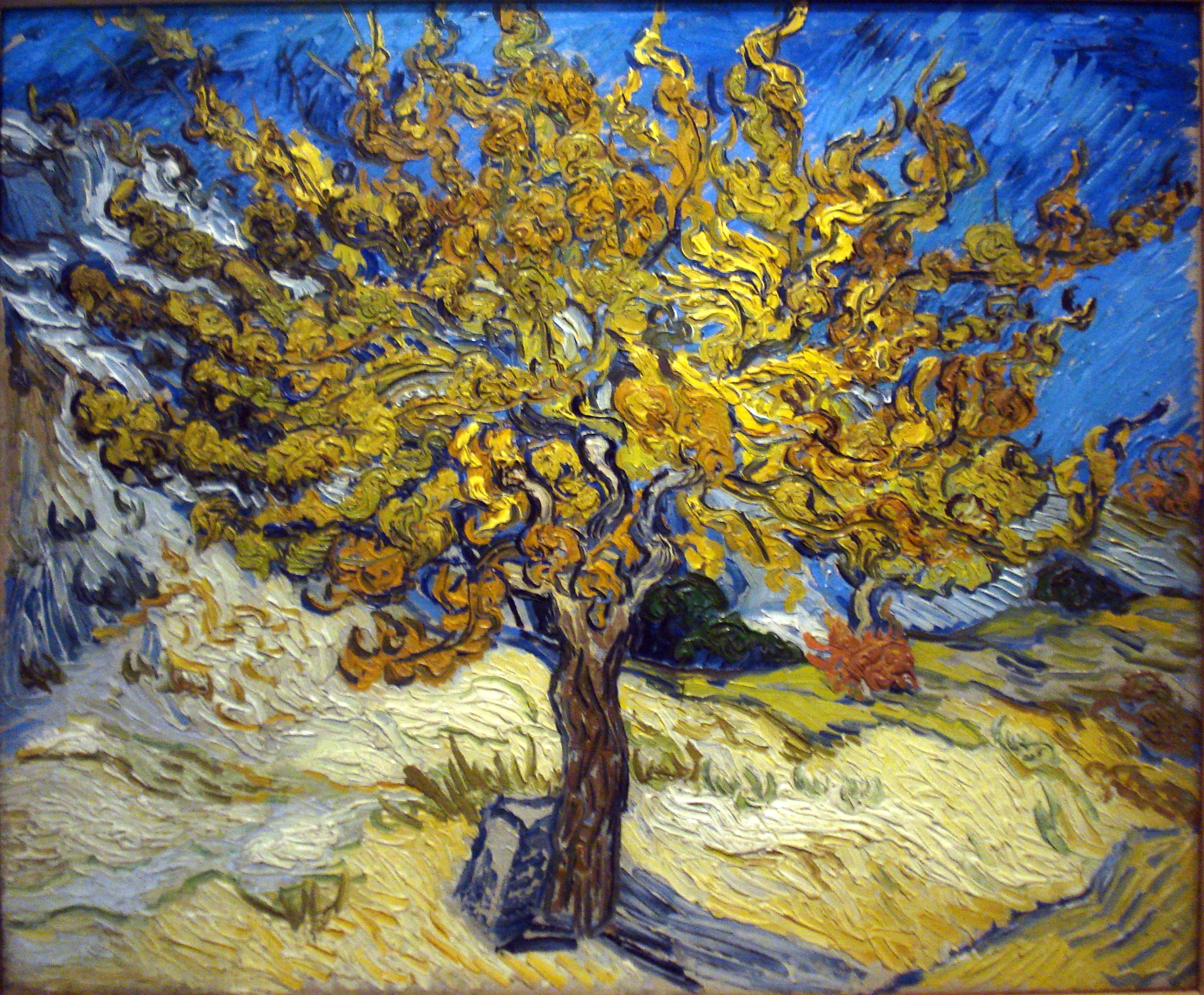
Mulberry Tree by Vincent van Gogh

A Babylonian etiological myth, which Ovid incorporated into his Metamorphoses, attributes the reddish-purple colour of the mulberry fruits to the tragic deaths of the lovers Pyramus and Thisbe. Meeting under a mulberry tree (probably the native Morus nigra), Thisbe dies by suicide by sword after Pyramus does the same, he having believed, on finding her bloodstained cloak, that she was killed by a lion. Their splashed blood stained the previously white fruit, and the gods forever changed the mulberry's colour to honour their forbidden love.

In the Old Testament's 1 Maccabees, the Seleucids used the "blood of grapes and mulberries" to provoke their war elephants in preparation for battle against Jewish rebels.

The nursery rhyme "Here We Go Round the Mulberry Bush" uses the tree in the refrain, as do some contemporary American versions of the nursery rhyme "Pop Goes the Weasel".

Vincent van Gogh featured the mulberry tree in some of his paintings, notably The Mulberry Tree (Mûrier, 1889.
