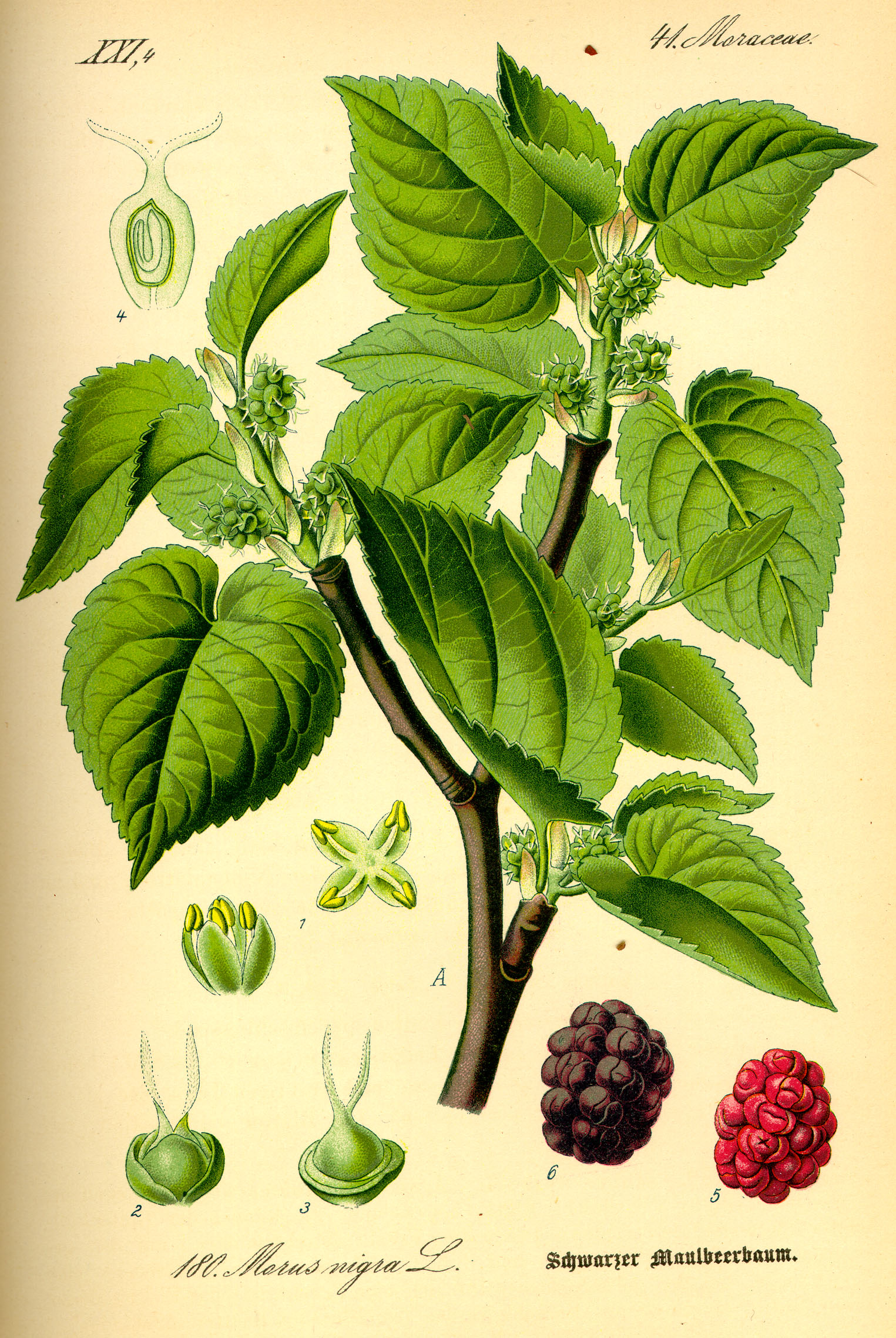
- Plate from book: Flora of Germany, Austria, and Switzerland (1885)

Conservation status
- Data Deficient (IUCN 3.1)

Scientific classification
- Kingdom: Plantae
- Clade: Tracheophytes
- Clade: Angiosperms
- Clade: Eudicots
- Clade: Rosids
- Order: Rosales
- Family: Moraceae
- Genus: Morus
- Species: M. nigra

Binomial name
- Morus nigra L.

Synonyms
- List: Morus atrata Raf., nom. nud.; Morus cretica Raf.; Morus laciniata Mill.; Morus nigra var. dentata Ser.; Morus nigra var. laciniata (Mill.) Moretti; Morus nigra var. lobata Ser.; Morus nigra var. microcarpa Risso; Morus nigra var. scabra Moretti; Morus petiolaris Raf.; Morus siciliana Mill.

= Morus nigra =

Species of tree

Morus nigra, or the black mulberry, is a species of flowering plant in the family Moraceae that is probably native to western Asia. The berries are edible when ripe but must be consumed right away due to their softness.

== Description ==
Morus nigra is a deciduous tree growing to 10 metres (33 feet) tall by 15 m (49 ft) broad. The leaves are 10–20 centimetres (4–8 inches) long by 6–10 cm (2–4 in) broad – up to 23 cm (9 in) long on vigorous shoots, downy on the underside, the upper surface rough with very short, stiff hairs. Each somatic cell has 308 chromosomes in total, and exhibits tetratetracontaploidy (44x), meaning that its genome contains seven chromosomes, and each somatic cell has 44 copies of each. This is reported as ”the highest number of polyploidies among any known spermatophyte species“.

The fruit is a compound cluster of several small drupes that are dark purple, almost black when ripe, and they are 2.5 cm (1 in) in diameter. Black mulberry is richly flavoured, similar to the red mulberry (Morus rubra) rather than the more insipid fruit of the white mulberry (Morus alba). Mulberry fruit color derives from anthocyanins.

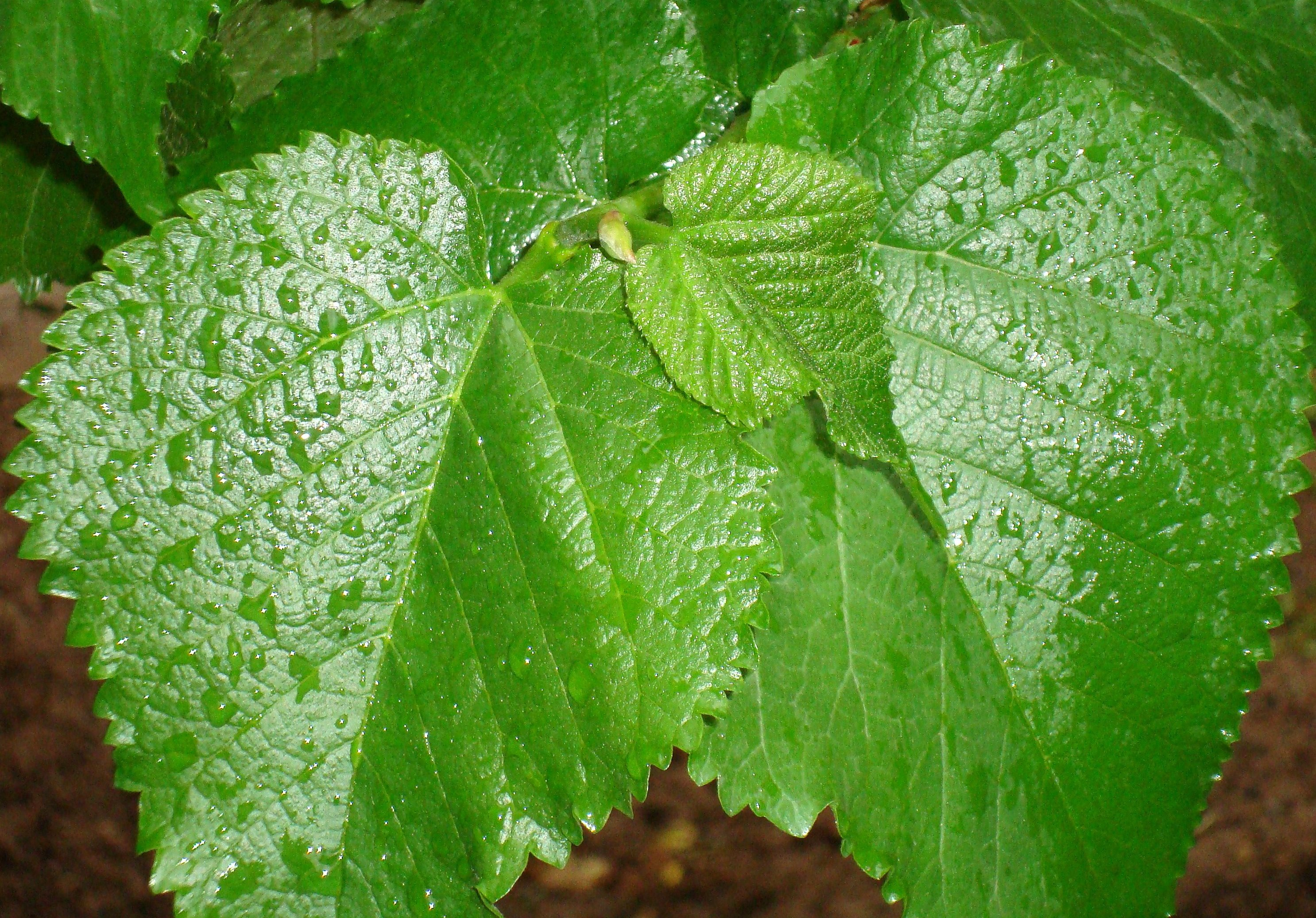
Leaf

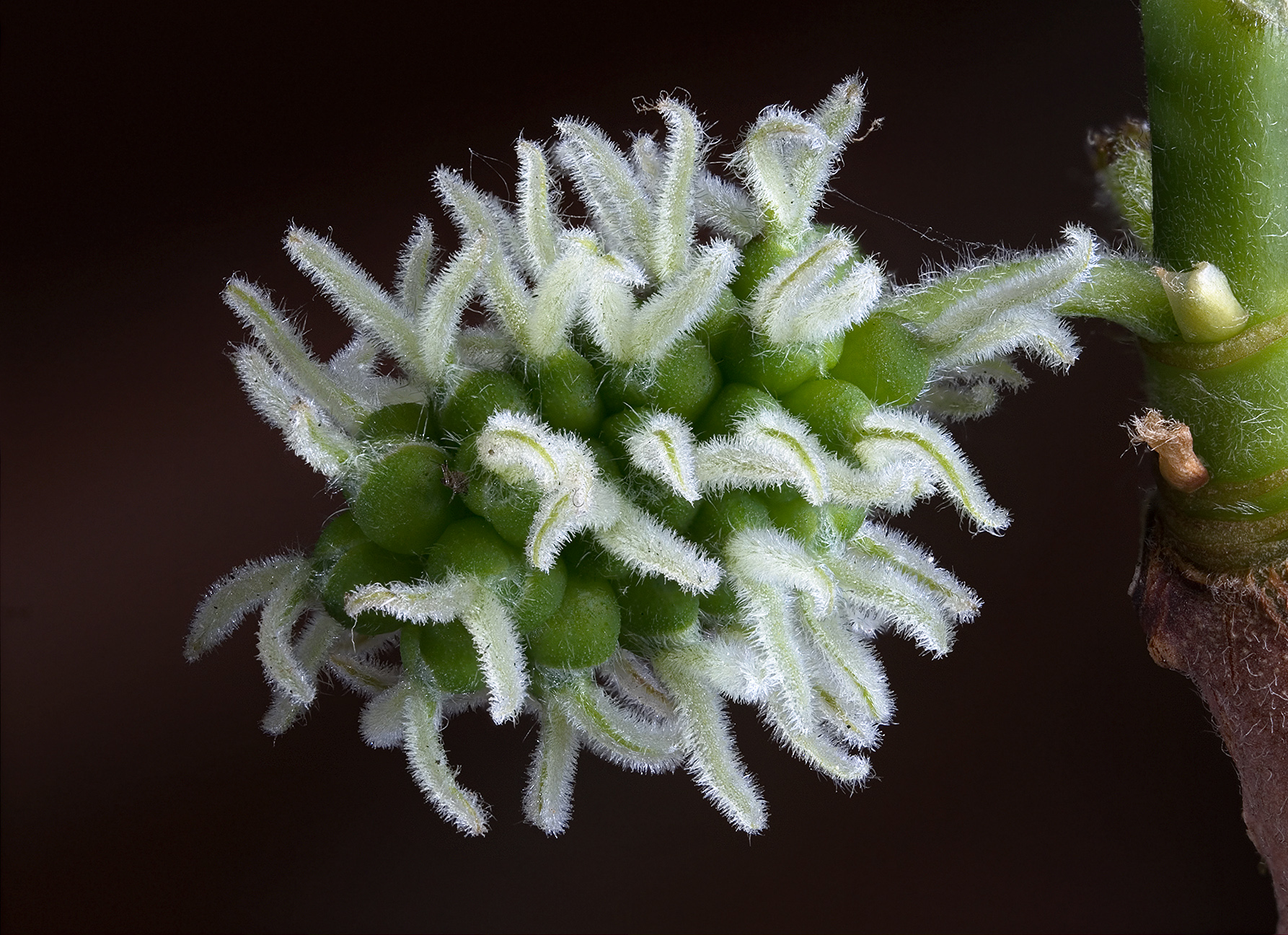
Female flowers

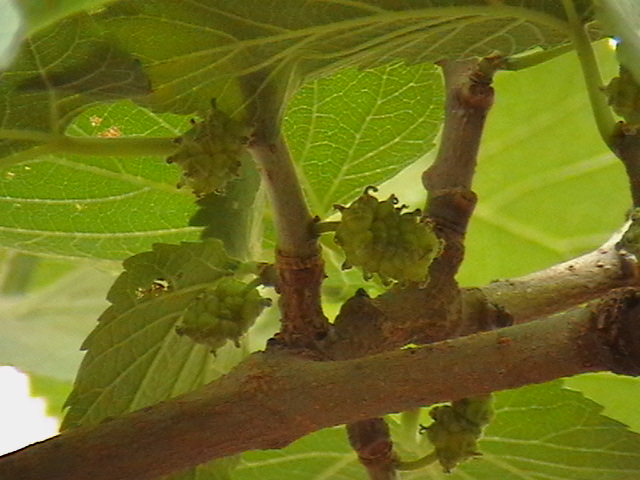
Unripe fruit, in Iran

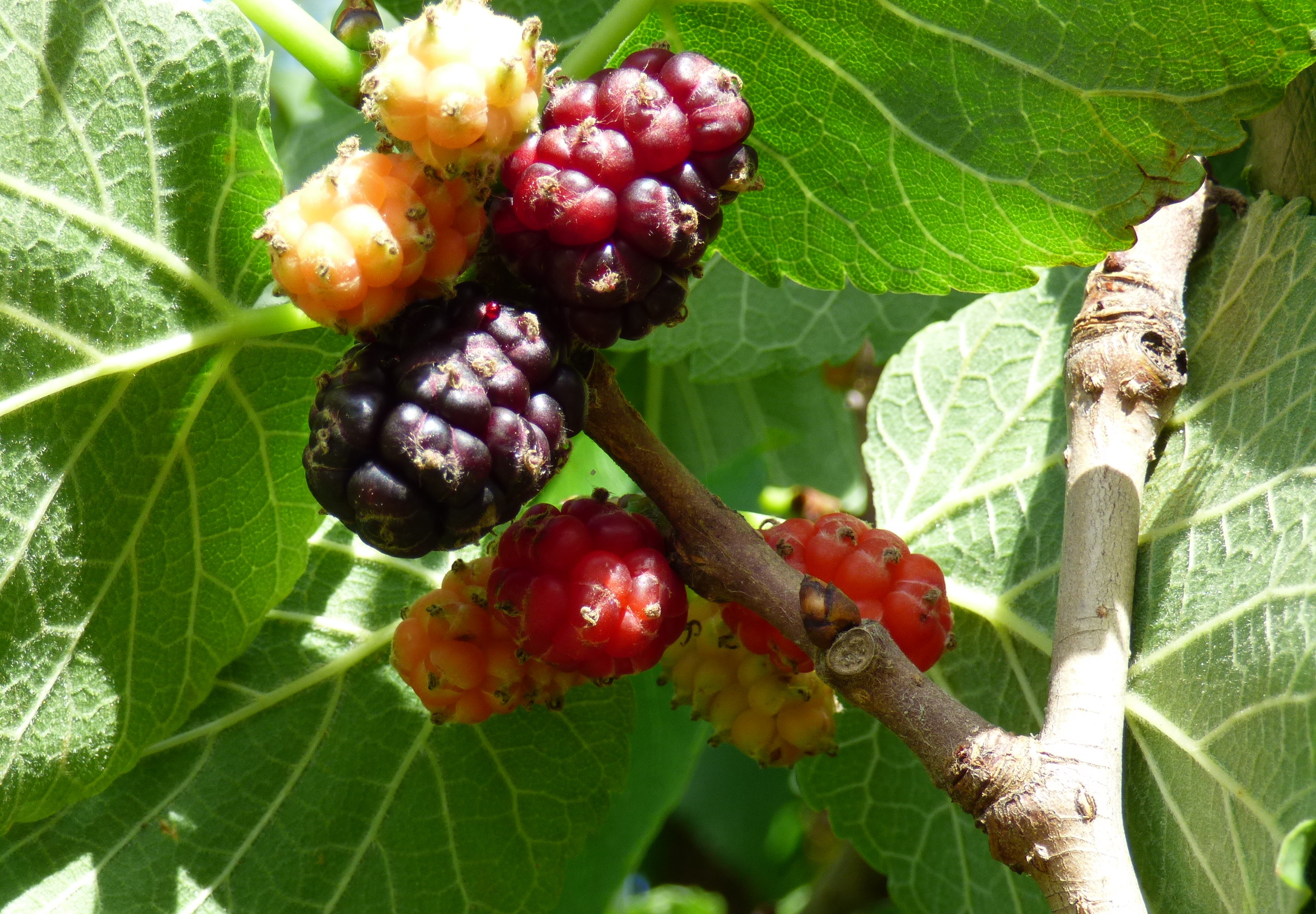
Ripe fruit and foliage

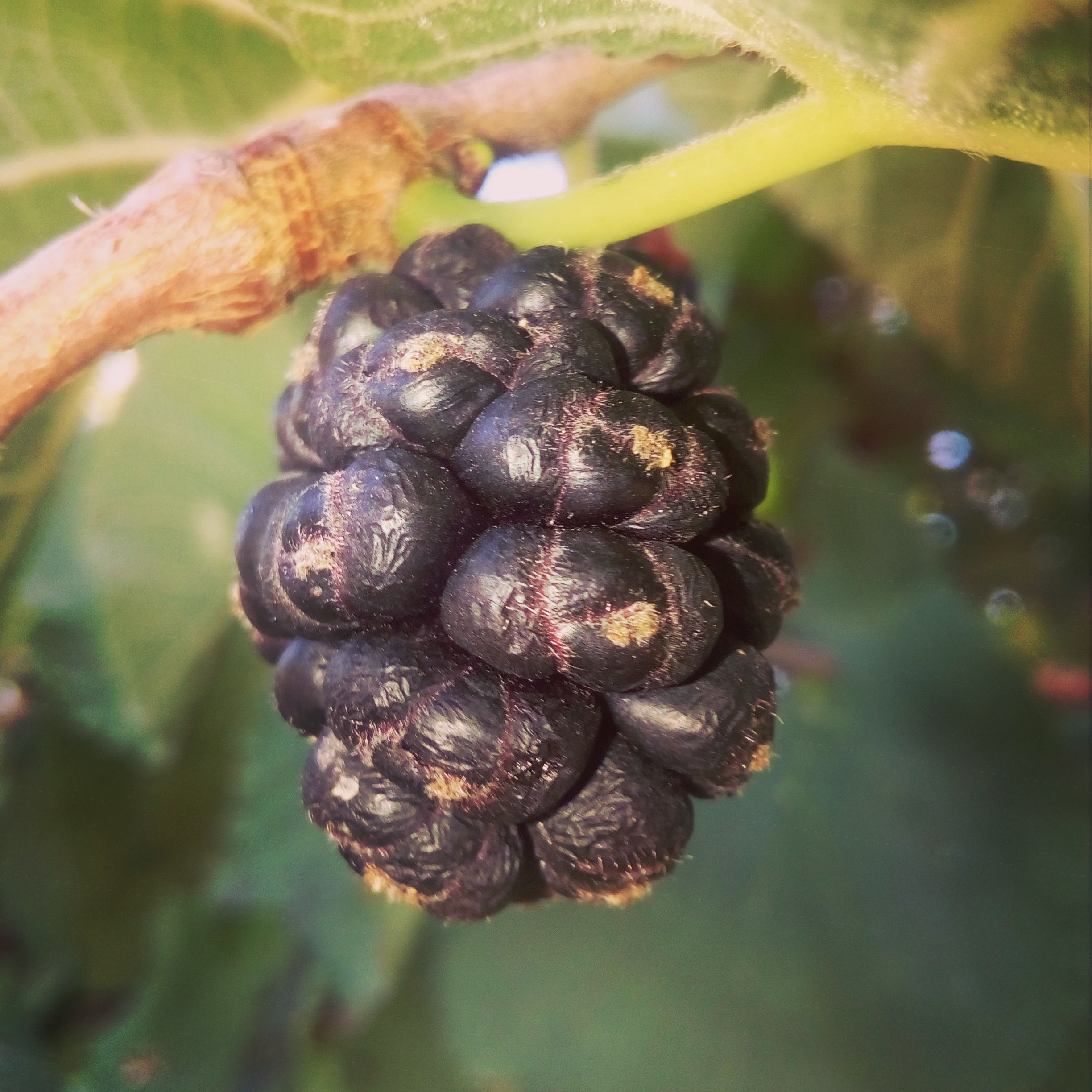
Fruit close-up, in Algeria

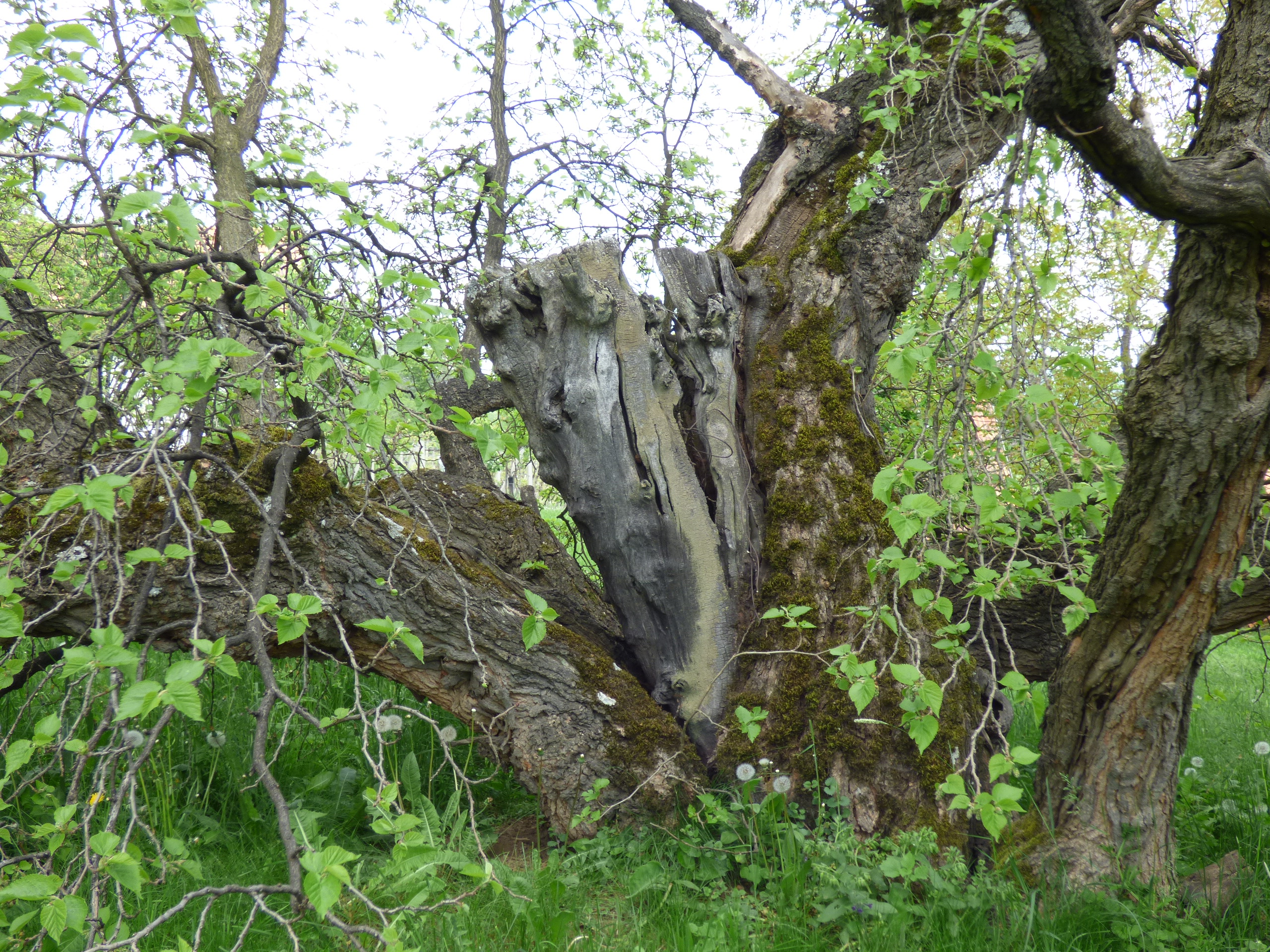
An old specimen in spring

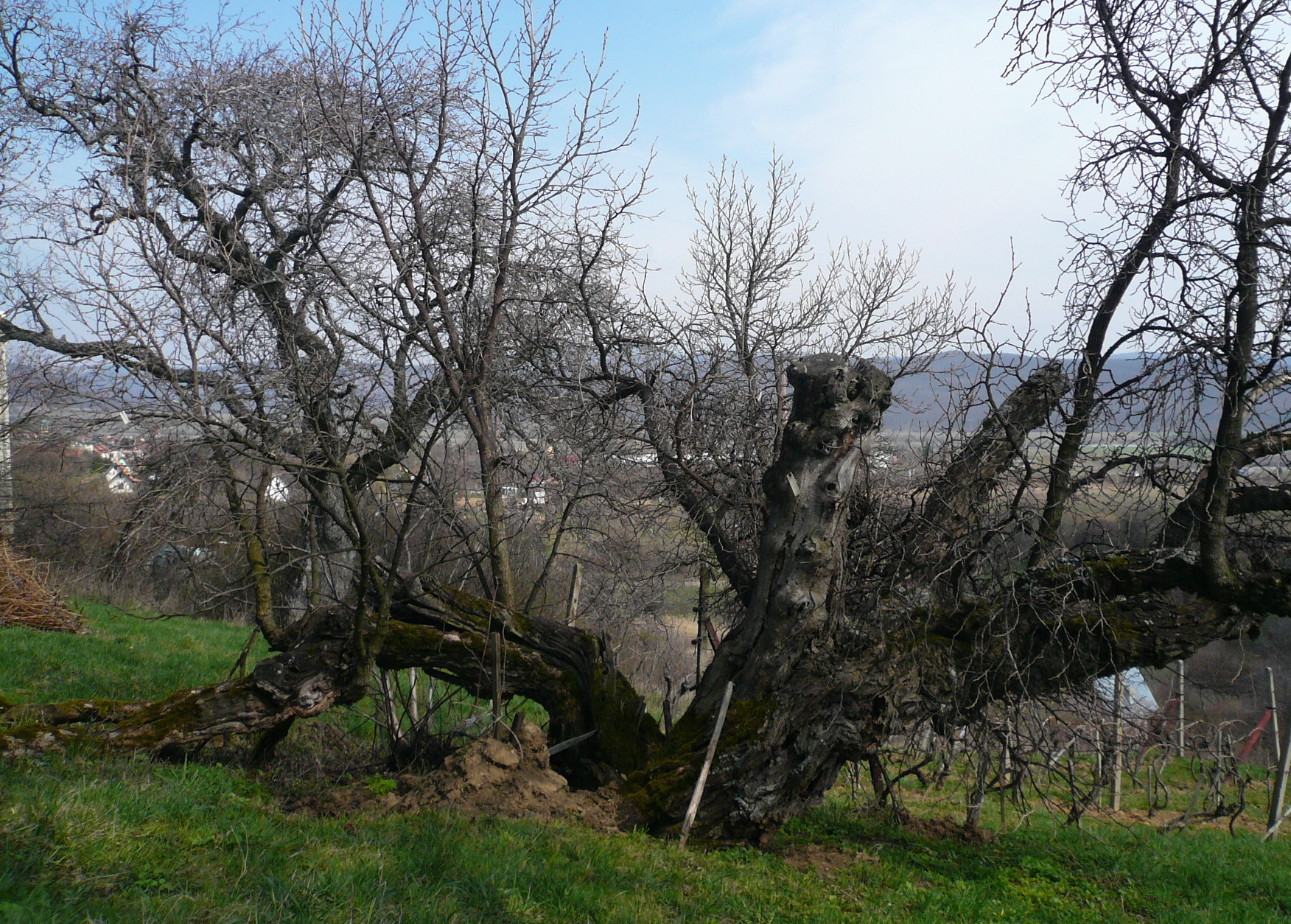
A centuries-old specimen

=== Similar species ===
Sometimes other mulberry species are confused with black mulberry, particularly black-fruited individuals of the white mulberry. Black mulberry may be distinguished from the white mulberry by the uniformly hairy lower surface of its leaves.

== Cultivation ==
The precise origin of M. nigra unknown, but it is thought to have originated in the mountainous areas of Mesopotamia and Persia (i.e. Armenian highlands).

The black mulberry is a slow-growing tree cultivated across Europe, North Africa and parts of Asia. Research of genetic diversity of over 250 old black mulberry trees in Turkey, Iran and Azerbaijan has found no genetic diversity. This suggests that all existing black mulberry trees in the hypothesized area of origin and also elsewhere in the world are clones. This might be the result of propagation by cuttings and layering complemented by apomictic seed formation.

In Persian, the black mulberry is called šâh-tut (شاه‌توت), a word formed by combining šâh ('king') and tut ('mulberry').

The black mulberry was imported into Britain in the 17th century in the hope that it would be useful in the cultivation of silkworms (Bombyx mori). It was unsuccessful in that enterprise because silkworms prefer the white mulberry. However, the plantings have left a legacy of large and old trees in many country house gardens. The cultivars, M. nigra 'Chelsea' (Syn. 'King James'), and M. nigra 'Jerusalem' have been awarded the Award of Garden Merit by the Royal Horticultural Society. Both cultivars are female (F) and self-fertile.

Mulberries, raw
Nutritional value per 100 g (3.5 oz)
- Energy: 180 kJ (43 kcal)
- Carbohydrates: 9.8 g
- Sugars: 8.1
- Dietary fiber: 1.7 g
- Fat: 0.39 g
- Saturated: 0.27 g
- Monounsaturated: 0.041 g
- Polyunsaturated: 0.207 g
- Protein: 1.44 g
Vitamins and minerals
Vitamins	Quantity %DV^{†}
Vitamin A equiv.	0% 1 μg
Vitamin A	25 IU
Thiamine (B1)	2% 0.029 mg
Riboflavin (B2)	8% 0.101 mg
Niacin (B3)	4% 0.62 mg
Vitamin B6	3% 0.05 mg
Folate (B9)	2% 6 μg
Choline	2% 12.3 mg
Vitamin C	40% 36.4 mg
Vitamin E	6% 0.87 mg
Vitamin K	7% 7.8 μg
Minerals	Quantity %DV^{†}
Calcium	3% 39 mg
Iron	10% 1.85 mg
Magnesium	4% 18 mg
Phosphorus	3% 38 mg
Potassium	6% 194 mg
Sodium	0% 10 mg
Zinc	1% 0.12 mg
- Link to USDA Database entry
- ^{†}Percentages estimated using US recommendations for adults, except for potassium, which is estimated based on expert recommendation from the National Academies.

The largest-documented local concentration of black mulberries in Europe may be found in the vineyards of Pukanec in Slovakia, which contain 470 black mulberry trees. Approximately 400 additional trees can be found in the surrounding villages.

== Uses ==
The fruit is edible and the tree has long been cultivated for this property. The fruit falls as soon it ripens and is soft, requiring it to be eaten right away. Often, jams and sherbets are made from the fruit in Persia.

The fruit has been present in the Southern Levant since antiquity. In the Books of Maccabees, it is noted that the Greeks used the fruit to provoke their war elephants in preparation for battle against Jewish rebels during the Maccabean Revolt in the 2nd century BCE. The fruit is also mentioned in the Mishnah and later rabbinic texts. In the 9th century CE, Al-Kindi referenced the fruit as having healing seeds, while Ibn Badis, writing in the 11th century, noted its use in the production of ink.

M. nigra was much used in folk medicine, especially in the treatment of tapeworm.
