= Mulberry Garden (Režný Újezd) =

Garden in Režný Újezd, Czech Republic

Coordinates: 50°31′3.73″N 13°59′34.45″E

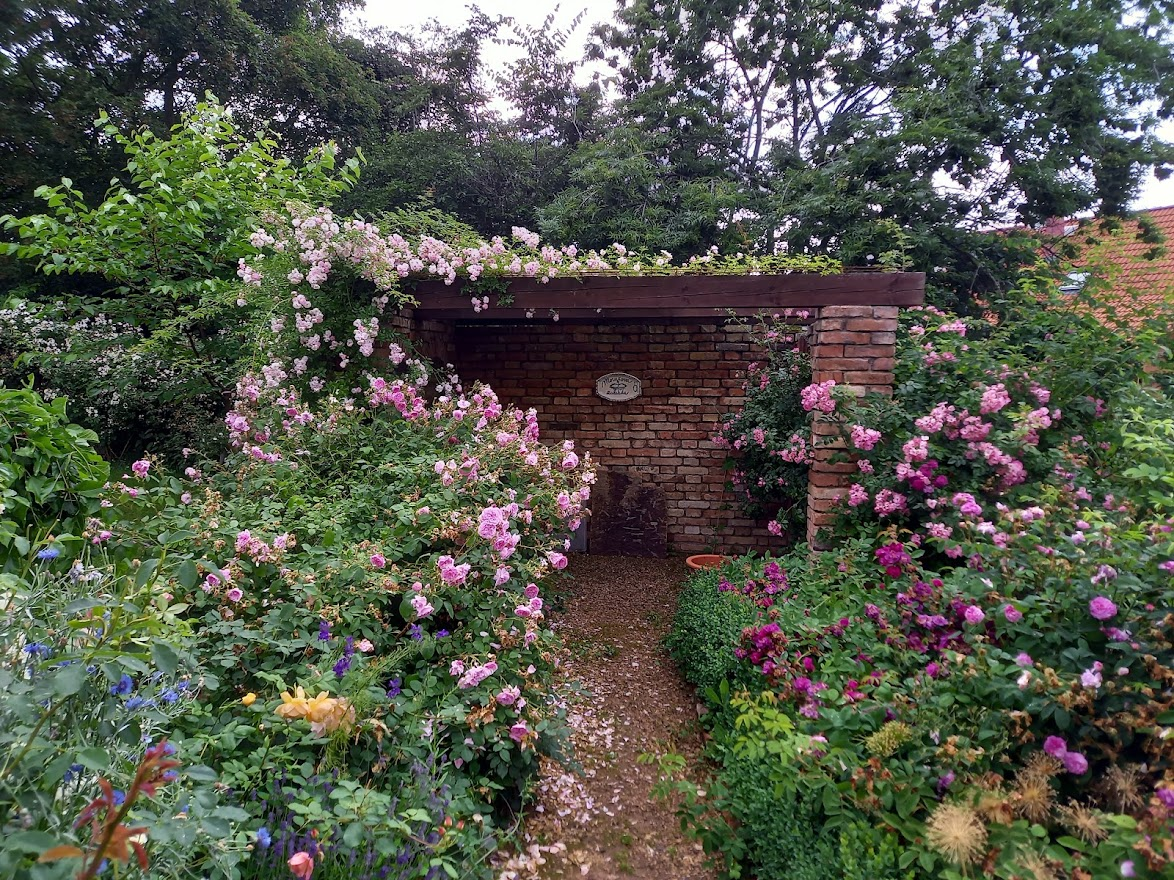
English roses in the Mulberry garden, Czech Republic

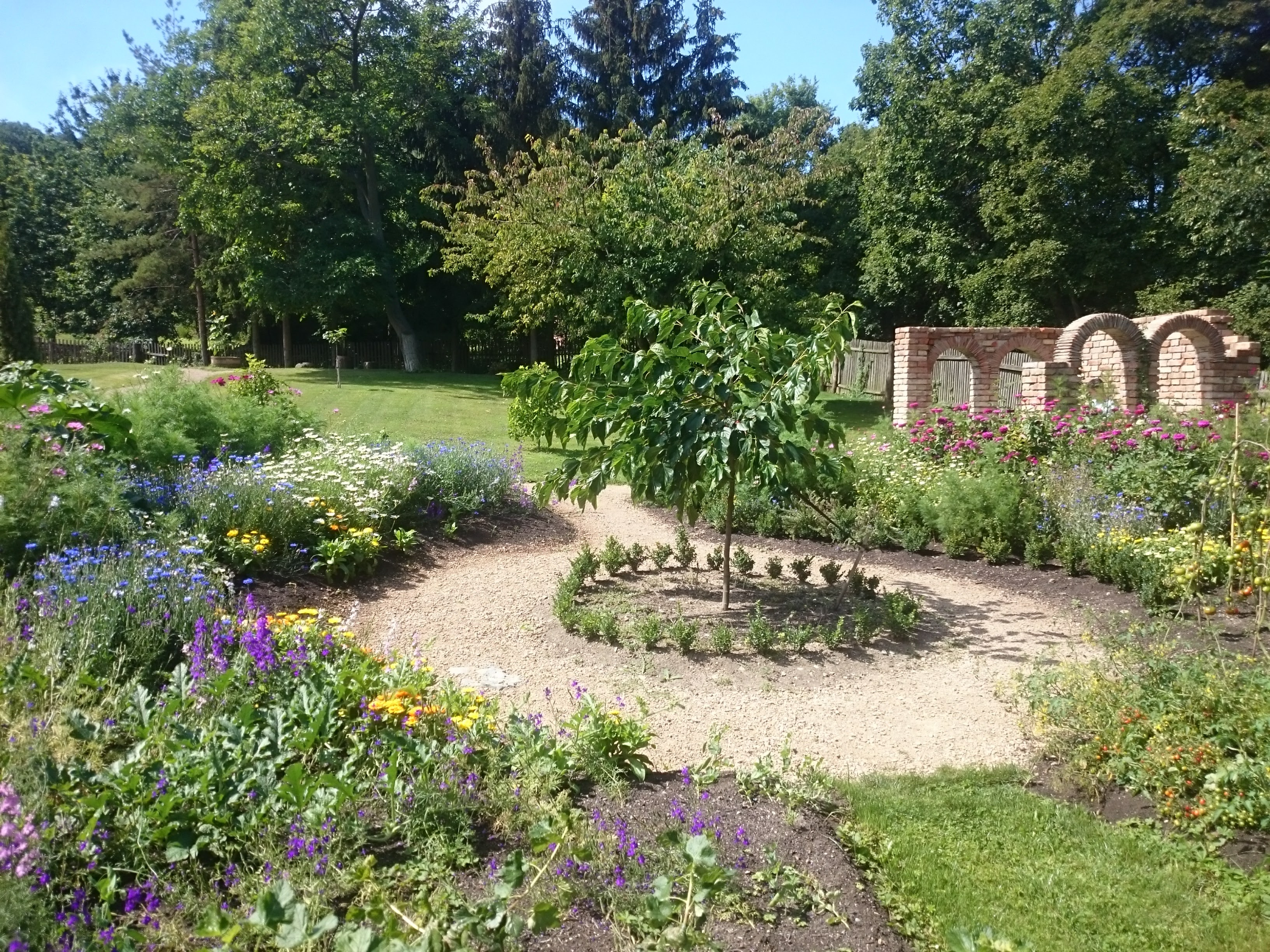
Central flowerbed with a black mulberry in Mulberry Garden

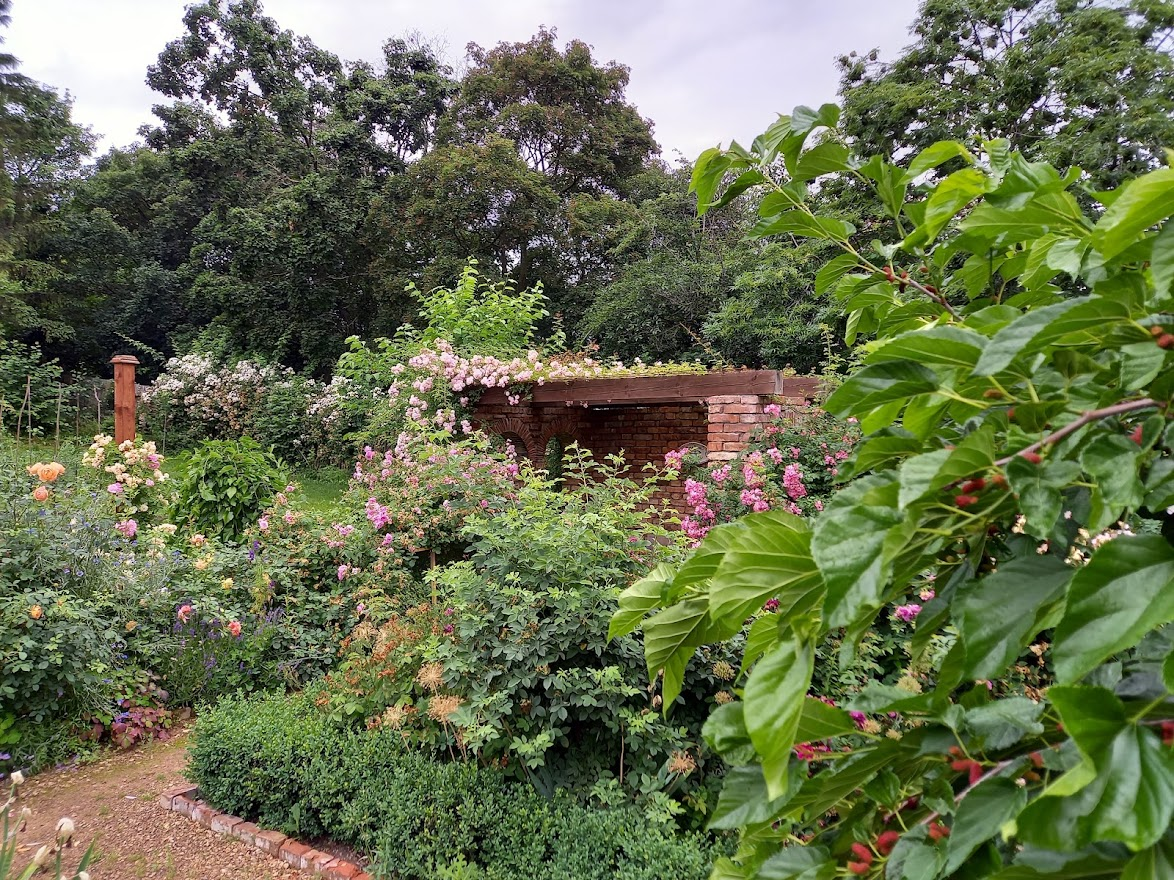
Summer house in the Mulberry garden, surrounded with roses

The Mulberry garden, originally Morušová zahrada in Czech, is a cottage garden in the Czech Republic, situated in the Czech Central Uplands in the village Režný Újezd, 7 kilometres (4.3 mi) northwest of the town Lovosice. The garden was established in 2014 by local gardeners admiring the English cottage garden style. Apart from different kinds of plants such as perennial plants, English historical roses, Czech roses, annual plants, and bulbs, several uncommon fruit trees are grown, especially various mulberry varieties. Mulberry garden is located along the green tourist track to Boreč hill in the grounds of former Gentlemen's farm, house no. 2.

The nearby hill Borec is a geological and botanical location characterized by its hydrothermal vents, micro-exhalations and specific fauna and flora.

== Specimen ==
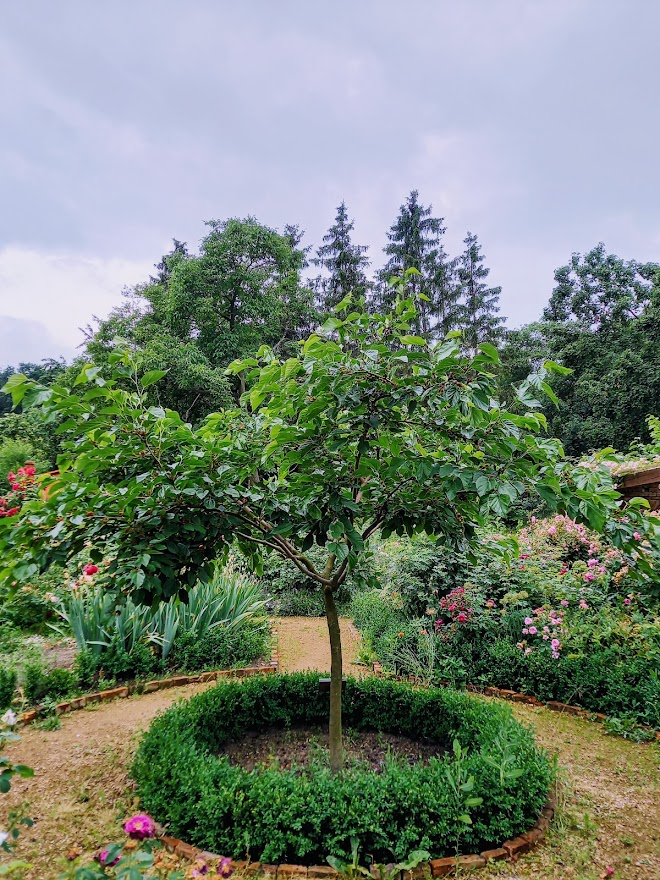
Morus alba in the Mulberry garden Czech Republic

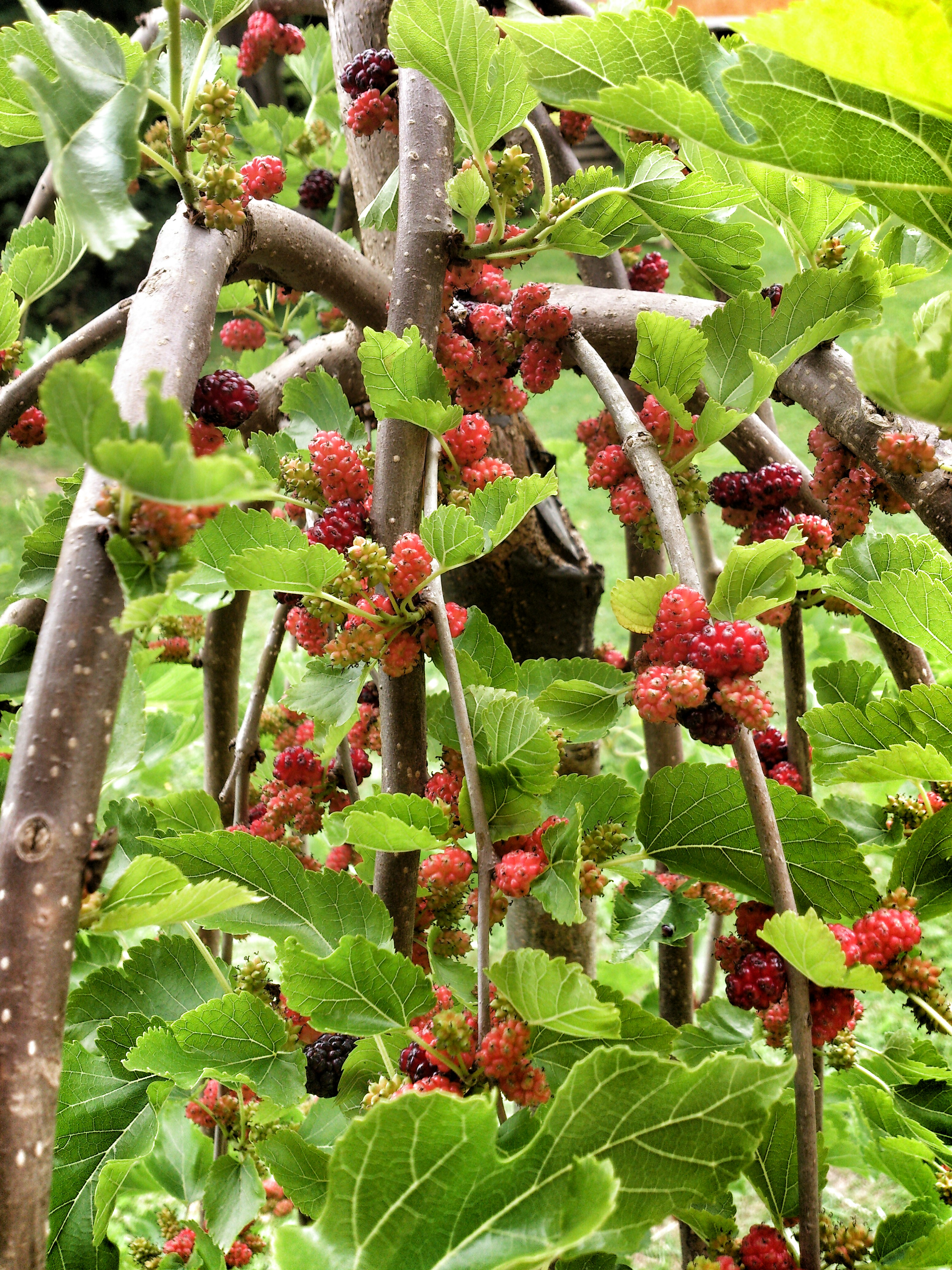
Weeping Mulberry

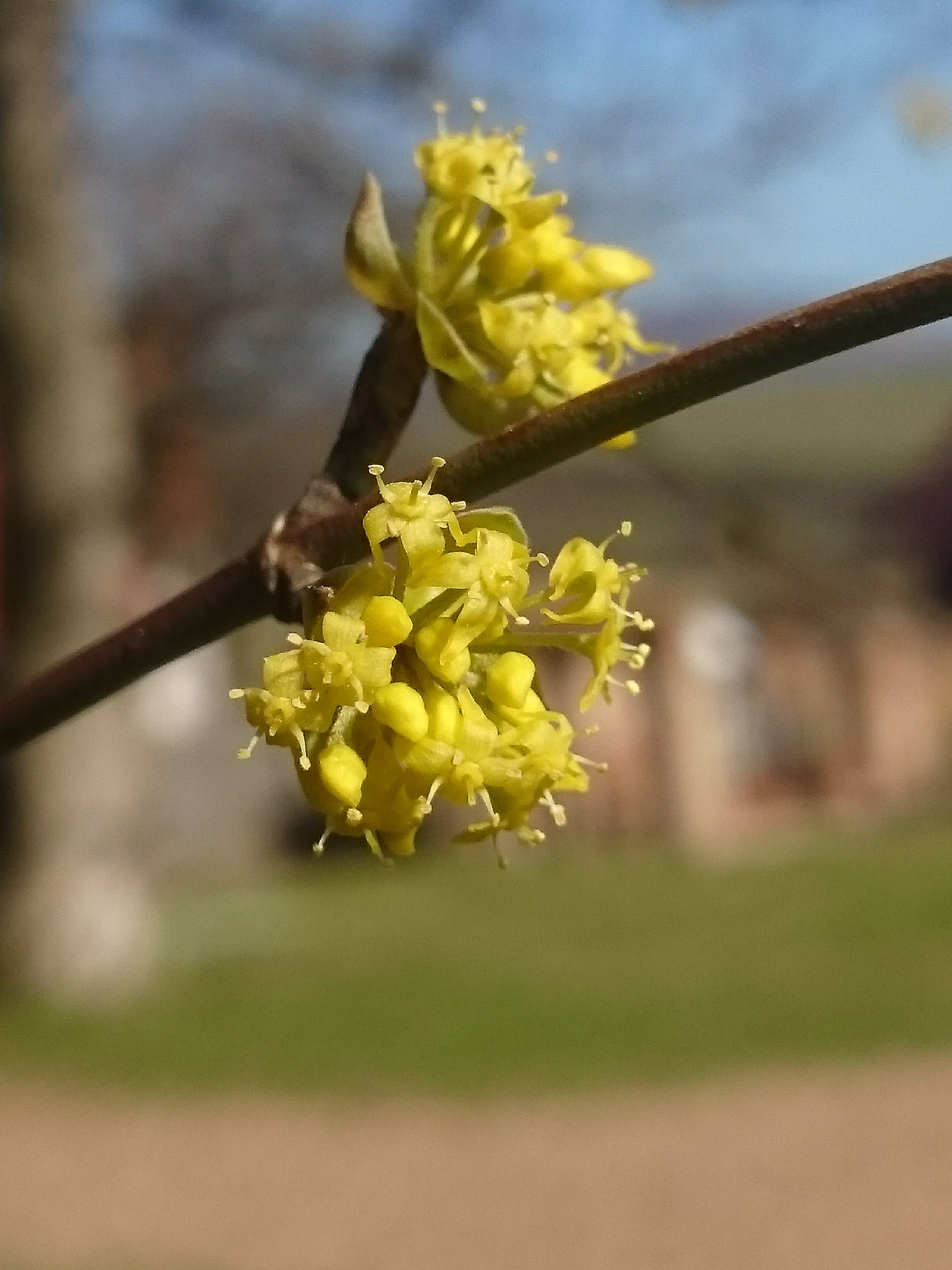
Cornus Mas blossom

Mulberry trees:
Morus alba "Bzenecká" - dark fruit, Czech variety
Morus alba "Dolce Vita" - white fruit, from Italy
Morus alba "Galicia" - dark fruit, Ukrainian variety
Morus alba "Rožnovská"- dark fruit, Czech variety
Morus alba "Mikulov"- white fruit, Czech variety
Morus alba "Monte negro"- dark fruit, Italian variety
Morus alba "Hlohovecká bílá"- white fruit, Slovak variety
Morus alba "Lelov" - no name black fruit variety from local area
Morus alba pendula - weeping mulberry
Morus bombycis "Shin-Tso"
Morus alba x rubra "Persian Everbearing"
Morus alba x rubra "Wellington"
Morus alba x rubra "Hlohovecká pozdní"- dark fruit, Slovak variety
Morus macroura "Pakistan Giant"
Morus macroura "White"
Morus macroura "King of White"
Morus macroura "Taiwan Long"
Morus macroura unknown variety from France
Morus nigra- original black mulberry, from United Kingdom
Morus nigra "Trnaviensis" - Slovak variety, most likely a cross between Morus rubra and Morus nigra

Other trees:
Prusus dulcis "Zora", "Supernova", "Vama", "Sadkoploda krajova"
Malus Domestica - Czech varieties Prunus Armeniaca - unknown varieties
Dogwood Cornelian cherry - "Bolestraszycki", "Dublany", "Kazanlak", "Swietljaczok", "Szafer", "Vydubeckyj" - Polish, Ukrainian and Bulgarian varieties
Prusus avium "Bigarreau Coeur de Pigeon", "Lapins"
Ficus carica - several varieties
Corylus avellana - several varieties
Prunus Domestica - Czech variety

== See also ==
- Mulberry (disambiguation)
