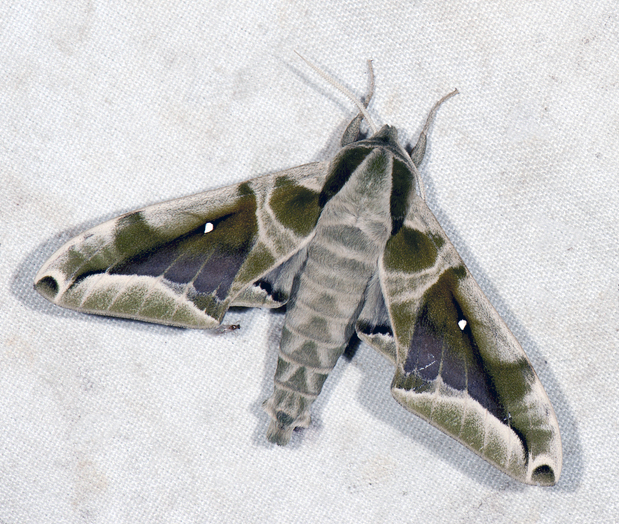

Scientific classification
- Domain: Eukaryota
- Kingdom: Animalia
- Phylum: Arthropoda
- Class: Insecta
- Order: Lepidoptera
- Family: Sphingidae
- Tribe: Smerinthini
- Genus: Parum; Rothschild & Jordan, 1903
- Species: P. colligata

Binomial name
- Parum colligata (Walker, 1856)

Synonyms
- (Species): Daphnusa colligata Walker, 1856; Metagastes bieti Oberthür, 1886; Parum colligata saturata Mell, 1922; Parum colligata tristis Bryk, 1944

= Parum =

Parum colligata

Single-species genus of moths

Parum is a genus of moths in the family Sphingidae erected by Walter Rothschild and Karl Jordan in 1903. It is monotypic, with a single species, Parum colligata, that was first described by Francis Walker in 1856.

== Distribution ==
Is found from Korea and Japan south throughout eastern and central China and Taiwan to Vietnam, northern Thailand and north-eastern Myanmar.

== Description ==
The wingspan is 69–90 mm.

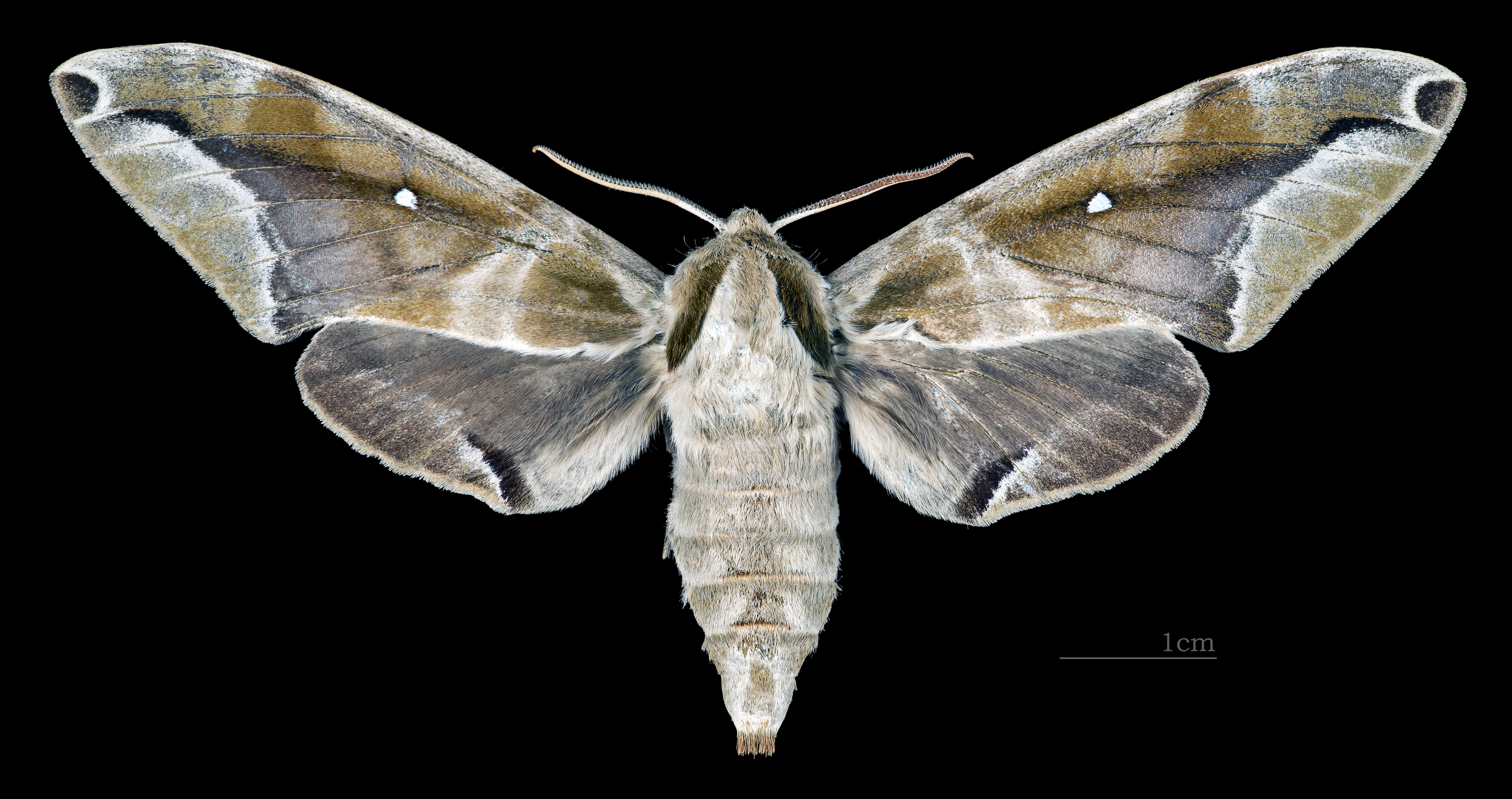
Female

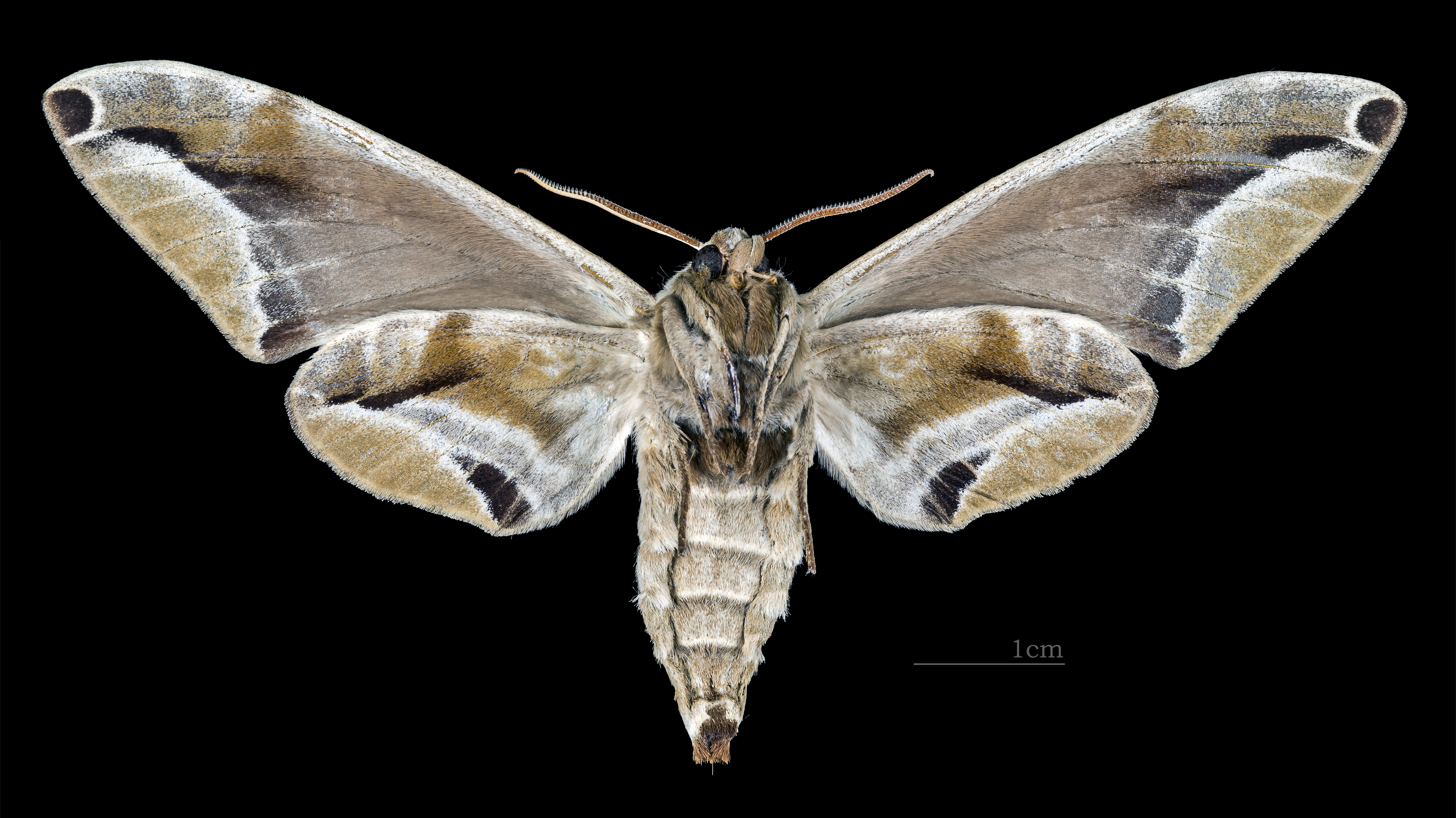
Female underside

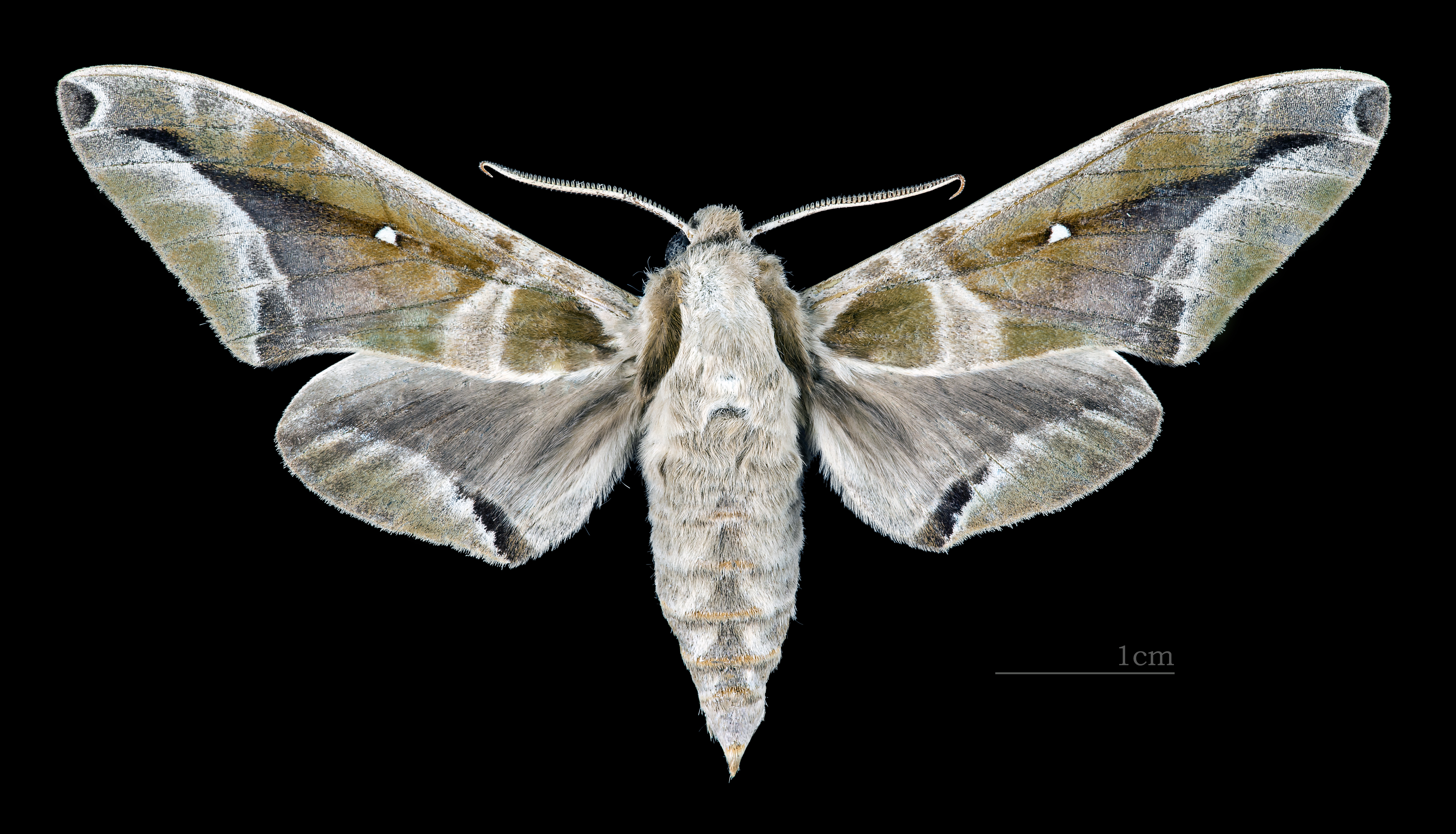
Male

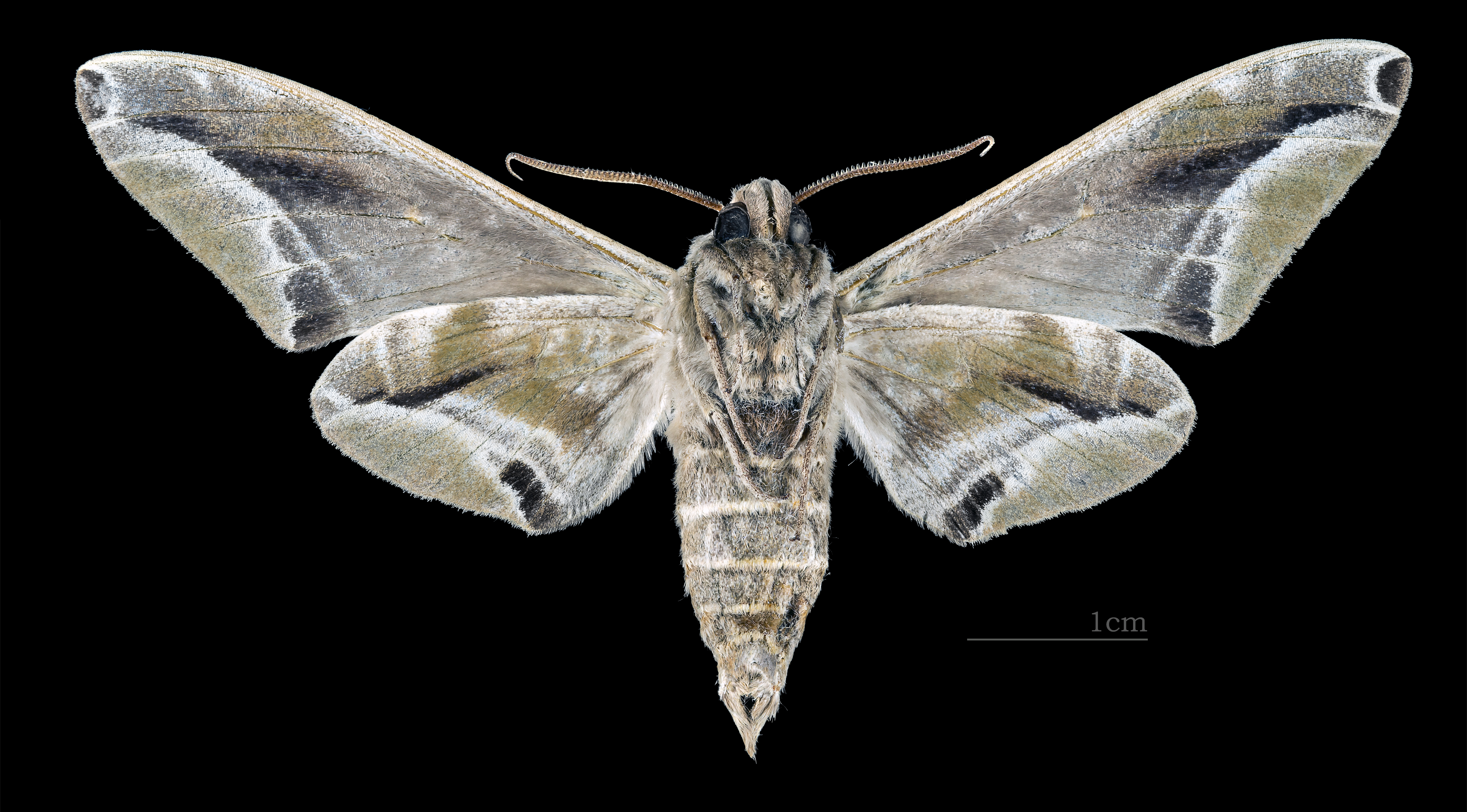
Male underside

== Biology ==
There are one or two generations per year in northern China, with adults on wing from May to July. Further south, there may be up to four generations. Adults have been recorded from mid-May to late September in Korea. The larvae have been recorded feeding on Broussonetia kaempferi, Broussonetia papyrifera and Morus alba in Guangdong. Other recorded food plants include Broussonetia kazinoki and Maclura fruticosa.
