= Mulberrofuran G =

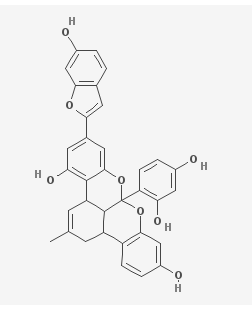

Names
- IUPAC name (1R,9S,13S)-1-(2,4-dihydroxyphenyl)-17-(6-hydroxy-1-benzofuran-2-yl)-11-methyl-2,20-dioxapentacyclo[11.7.1.0^{3,8}.0^{9,21}.0^{14,19}]henicosa-3(8),4,6,11,14,16,18-heptaene-5,15-diol
- Other names Albanol A

Identifiers
| CAS Number | 87085-00-5 |
| 3D model (JSmol) | Interactive image |
| ChEBI | CHEBI:2544 |
| ChEMBL | ChEMBL454705 |
| ChemSpider | 23340144 |
| KEGG | C08738 |
| PubChem CID | 44567218 |
| UNII | 39PXQ8D28J |
- InChI: InChI=1S/C34H26O8/c1-16-8-23-22-6-4-21(37)15-30(22)41-34(25-7-5-19(35)13-26(25)38)33(23)24(9-16)32-27(39)10-18(12-31(32)42-34)28-11-17-2-3-20(36)14-29(17)40-28/h2-7,9-15,23-24,33,35-39H,8H2,1H3/t23-,24-,33?,34+/m1/s1 Key: MJJWBJFYYRAYKU-WLKQUGLZSA-N
- SMILES: CC1=C[C@H]2C3[C@H](C1)C4=C(C=C(C=C4)O)O[C@]3(OC5=CC(=CC(=C25)O)C6=CC7=C(O6)C=C(C=C7)O)C8=C(C=C(C=C8)O)O
- Except where otherwise noted, data are given for materials in their standard state (at 25 °C [77 °F], 100 kPa). Infobox references

Mulberrofuran G (albanol A) is a bio-active compound isolated from the bark of Morus alba.
