= Režný Újezd =

Coordinates: 50°31′N 14°00′E

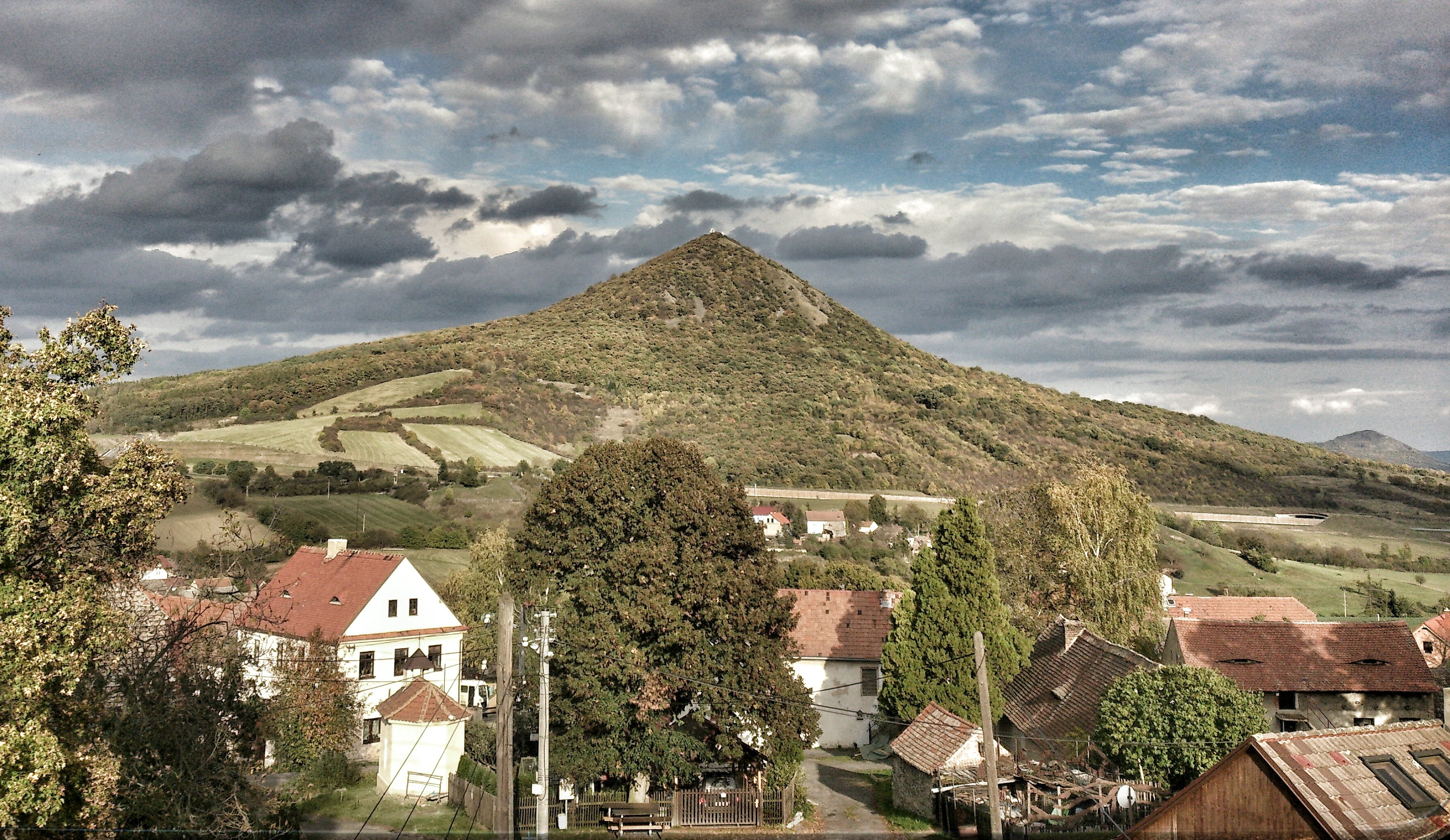

Režný Újezd forms one of the eleven local parts of Velemín in the Litoměřice District, part of the Usti Region of the Czech Republic. It lies on the northeastern slope of the hill Boreč (446 m), just about 4 km west from Lovosice town and less than 3 miles southeast of Velemín. There is 8 permanently occupied houses registered with 13 inhabitants (2001).

== Name ==
The name Režný comes of an older word for rye. Újezd is a medieval word for a land to be colonized.

== History ==
The earliest written account of the village with simple name Újezd dates back to 1224 and comes from a document of property of Saint George Monastery in Prague. There is a mention of an old gothic round-shaped fort surrounded by a moat, dating back to 1366, with Nicholas from Újezd living in it.

The oldest standing inhabited residential house is a former gentlemen's farm (No. 2), standing above the water tank in the centre of the village. The German family which lived in this house is mentioned in parish records in 1695 for the first time but the house was most likely built much earlier.

In July 1945 the German population was expelled from the Czech lands. Local eyewitnesses reported that the people were herded into the local chapel. The abandoned houses were taken by new settlers coming from the Czechoslovakia and Volhynia. In 1949 the cooperative farms were established in Režný Újezd with pig and cow farm, which finished after the fall of communist regime in 1989. Since 1990 the village Režný Újezd comes under the municipality of Velemín.

== Attractions and tourism ==
On the crossroad in the middle of the village there is a modern chapel from 1924, which got a new facade in November 2014.

A local nature trail to Boreč hill (green path) starts in Režný Újezd just below the chapel on the road. The trail has 9 stops with information boards. Hill Boreč is famous for its vents with micro-exhalations, unique flora and fauna.

The Mulberry garden has been established in 2014 in Režný Újezd by local gardeners and it can be found above the village center next to the big yellow Gentleman's Farm house. The garden is based on English cottage garden style and has 10 different young mulberry species, and other not very common fruit trees, such as Dogwood - Cornelian cherry, Almond trees and Figs.

There is another nature walking trail (yellow path) going through Režný Újezd starting in Malé Žernoseky, going through the top of Lovoš hill and leading to Košťálov castle.

On the southwestern edge of the village on the way to the top of Boreč hill there are slight terrain waves in the local gardens. These are remains of a former gothic fortress. Most of the remains disappeared in the 1990s and the place is no longer accessible to the public.

== Literature ==
A. Profous, Místní jména v Čechách IV. Praha 1957, page 435. R. Anděl a kol., Hrady, zámky a tvrze v Čechách, na Moravě a ve Slezsku III. Praha 1984, pages 399-400. E. Poche a kol., Umělecké památky Čech 3. Praha 1980, page 225.
