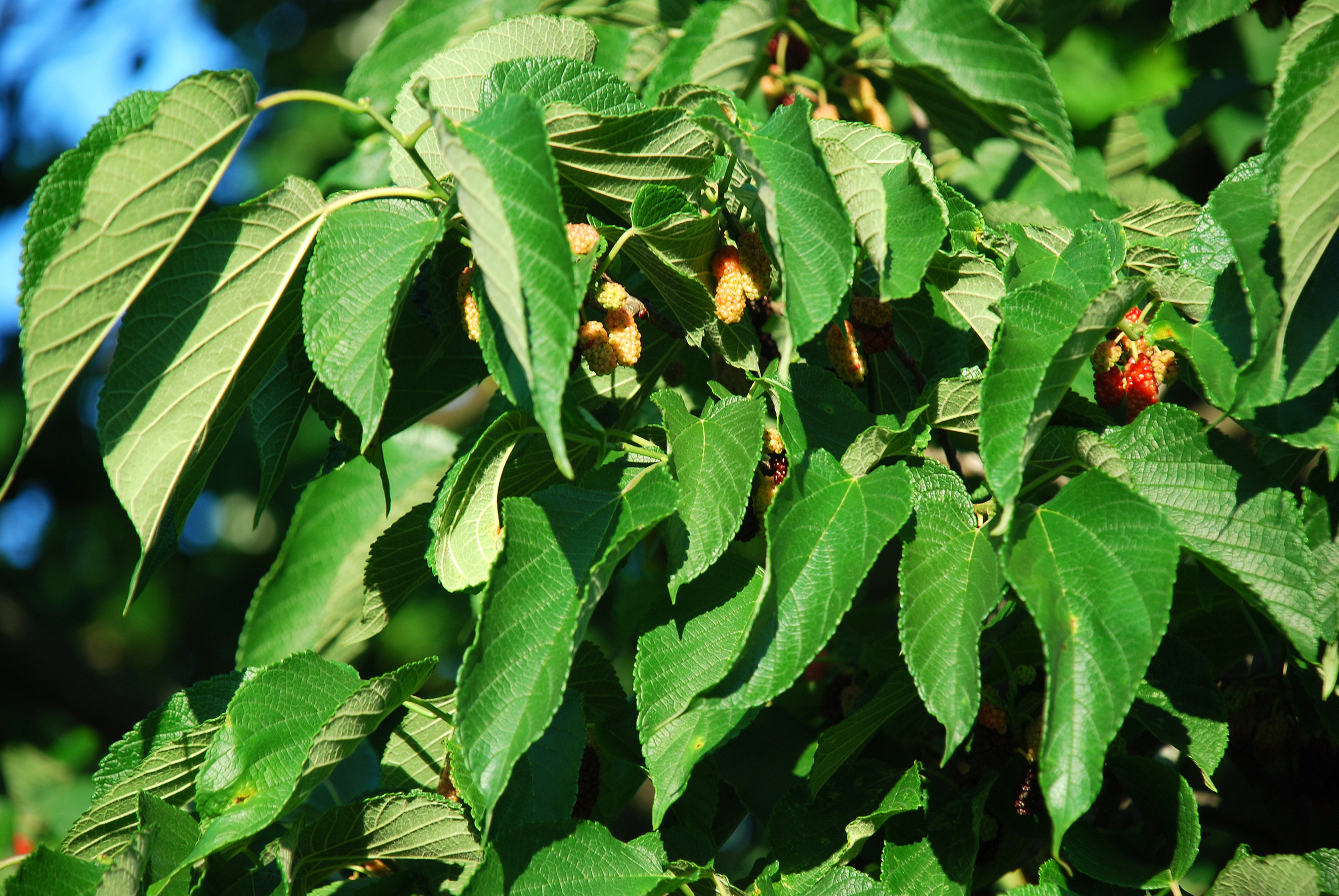

Conservation status
- Least Concern (IUCN 3.1)

Scientific classification
- Kingdom: Plantae
- Clade: Tracheophytes
- Clade: Angiosperms
- Clade: Eudicots
- Clade: Rosids
- Order: Rosales
- Family: Moraceae
- Genus: Morus
- Species: M. rubra

Binomial name
- Morus rubra L. 1753
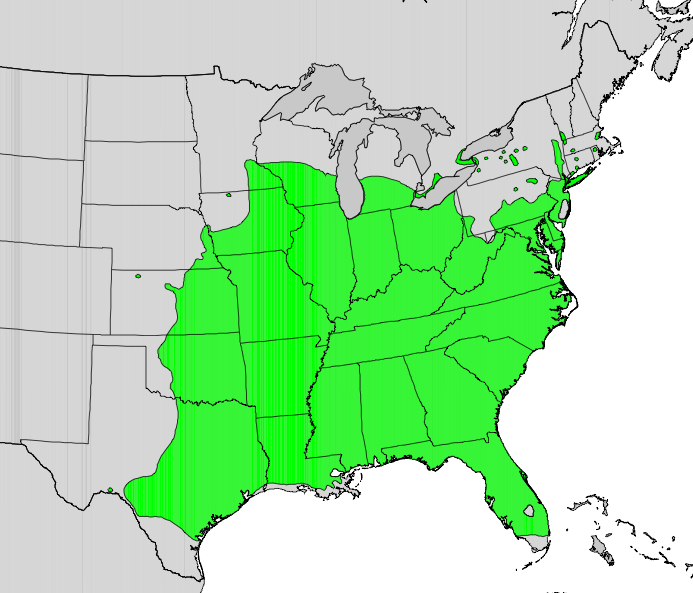
- Native range

Synonyms
- Synonymy: Morus argutidens Koidz.; Morus canadensis Poir.; Morus caroliniana Moretti; Morus murrayana Saar & Galla; Morus parvifolia Raf.; Morus pensylvanica Nois. ex G.Don; Morus reticulata Raf.; Morus riparia Raf.; Morus rubra f. atropurpurea F.Seym.; Morus rubra var. canadensis (Poir.) Moretti; Morus rubra var. incisa Bureau; Morus rubra f. incurva F.Seym.; Morus rubra f. laevis F.Seym.; Morus rubra var. missouriensis Audib. ex Moretti, nom. nud.; Morus rubra var. murrayana (Saar & Galla) Saar; Morus rubra var. pensylvanica (Nois. ex G.Don) Moretti; Morus rubra var. scabra (Willd.) Moretti; Morus rubra var. tomentosa (Raf.) Bureau; Morus scabra Willd.; Morus tomentosa Raf.; Morus virginica Duhamel ex Dippel, not validly publ.

= Morus rubra =

Species of tree

Morus rubra, commonly known as the red mulberry, is a species of mulberry native to eastern and central North America. It is found from Ontario, Minnesota, and Vermont south to southern Florida, and west as far as southeastern South Dakota, Nebraska, Kansas, and central Texas. There have been reports of isolated populations (very likely naturalized) in New Mexico, Idaho, and British Columbia.

Common in the United States, it is listed as an endangered species in Canada, and is susceptible to hybridization with the invasive white mulberry (M. alba), introduced from Asia.

== Description ==
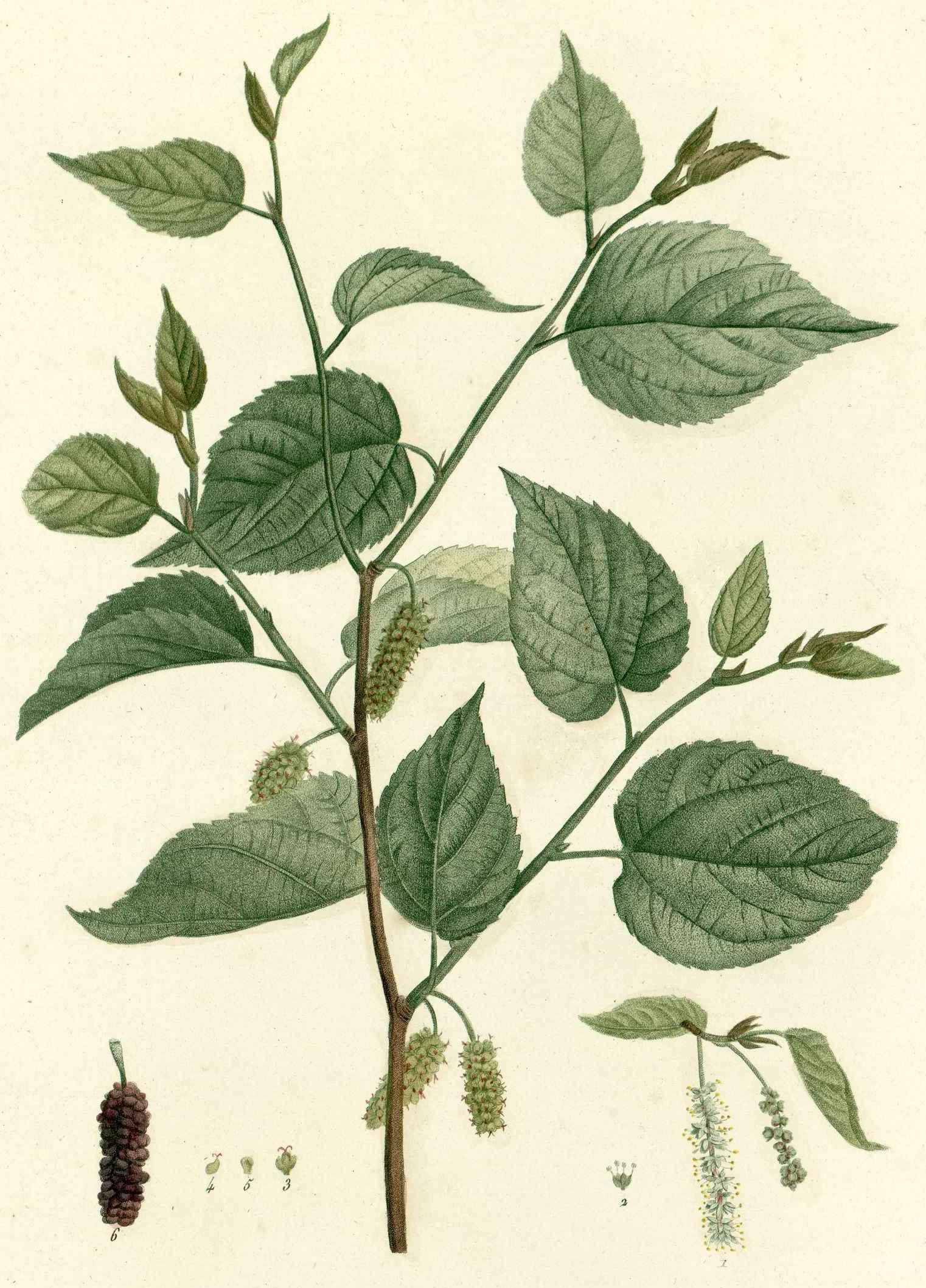
1809 illustration

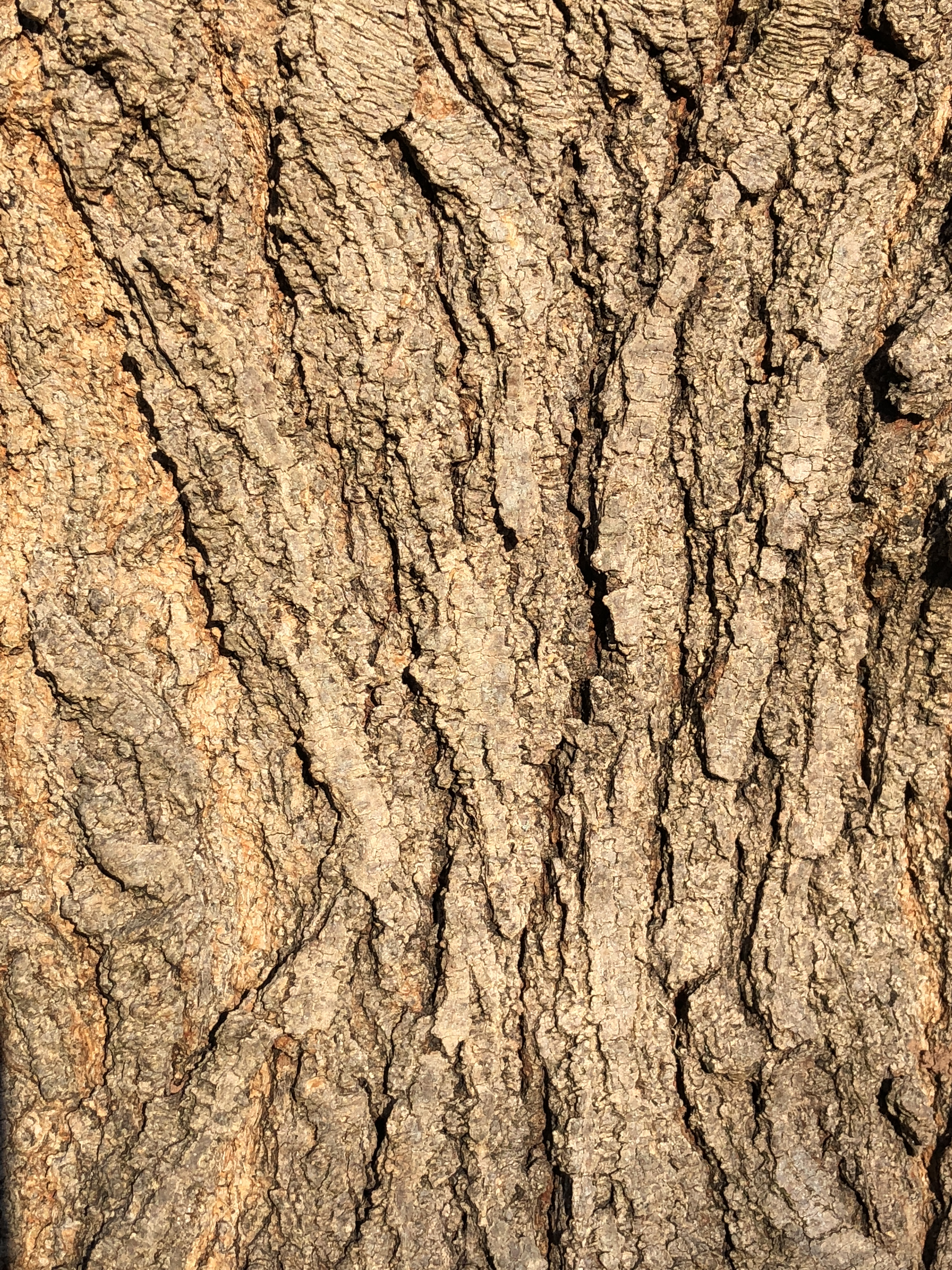
Bark of mature tree

Red mulberry is a small to medium-sized deciduous tree, growing to 10–15 metres (35–50 feet) tall, rarely 21 m (70 ft), with a trunk up to 50 centimetres (20 inches) in diameter. It can live for up to 125 years.

The leaves are alternate, 7–18 cm (2 3/4–7 in) long (rarely to 36 cm or 14 1/4 in) and 8–12 cm (3 1/4–4 3/4 in) broad (about twice as big as the white mulberry's leaves), simple, broadly cordate, with a shallow notch at the base, typically unlobed on mature trees although often with 2–3 lobes, particularly on young trees, and with a finely serrated margin. Unlike the leaves of white mulberry (M. alba) which have a lustrous upper surface, the red mulberry leaf upper surface is noticeably rough, similar in texture to fine sandpaper, and the underside is densely covered with soft hairs. The leaf petiole exudes milky sap when severed. The leaf petiole of red mulberry is usually round in shape and smooth while white mulberry has a grooved channel like petiole. The leaves turn a gold yellow in autumn.

The flowers are relatively inconspicuous: small, yellowish green or reddish green and opening as leaves emerge. Male and female flowers are usually on separate trees although they may occur on the same tree.

The fruit is a compound cluster of several small achenes surrounded by a fleshy calyx, similar in appearance to a blackberry, 2–3 cm (3/4–1 1/4 in) long. It is initially pale green, ripening to red or dark purple.

The red mulberry develops an extensive root system, containing lateral, horizontal roots that remain within the upper 24 in (61 cm) of the soil and smaller, vertical roots that go off the lateral roots. This combination gives stability and allows the tree to uptake the nutrients from the soil surface where nutrients are most abundant.

Red mulberry is hardy to subzero temperatures, relatively hardy to drought, pollution, and poor soil, though the white mulberry is hardier.

The berries are widely sought after by birds in spring and early summer in North America; as many as 31 species of birds have been recorded visiting a fruiting tree in Arkansas. The red mulberry is pollinated by the wind.

According to the National Register of Champion Trees, the largest extant red mulberry tree is 75 feet high, with a trunk circumference of 305 inches and average crown spread of 71 feet. The tree is located in Hamburg, Arkansas and was measured in 2018.

== Distribution ==
The red mulberry plant is native to the United States. M. rubra occurs from the Atlantic coast to the eastern edge of the Great Plains, south to southern Florida and north to southwestern Ontario in Canada. The native red mulberry can be mostly found in riparian areas and is considered rare and threatened in many areas including northeastern United States and southeastern Canada.

The morphologically similar M. alba is potentially posing a threat to the existence of M. rubra because of the rapid range expansion, aggressive growth patterns, and reproductive advantages over M. rubra. The red mulberry is currently considered endangered in Canada, and in the US, the states of Connecticut and Massachusetts as well as threatened in Michigan and Vermont.

== Uses ==
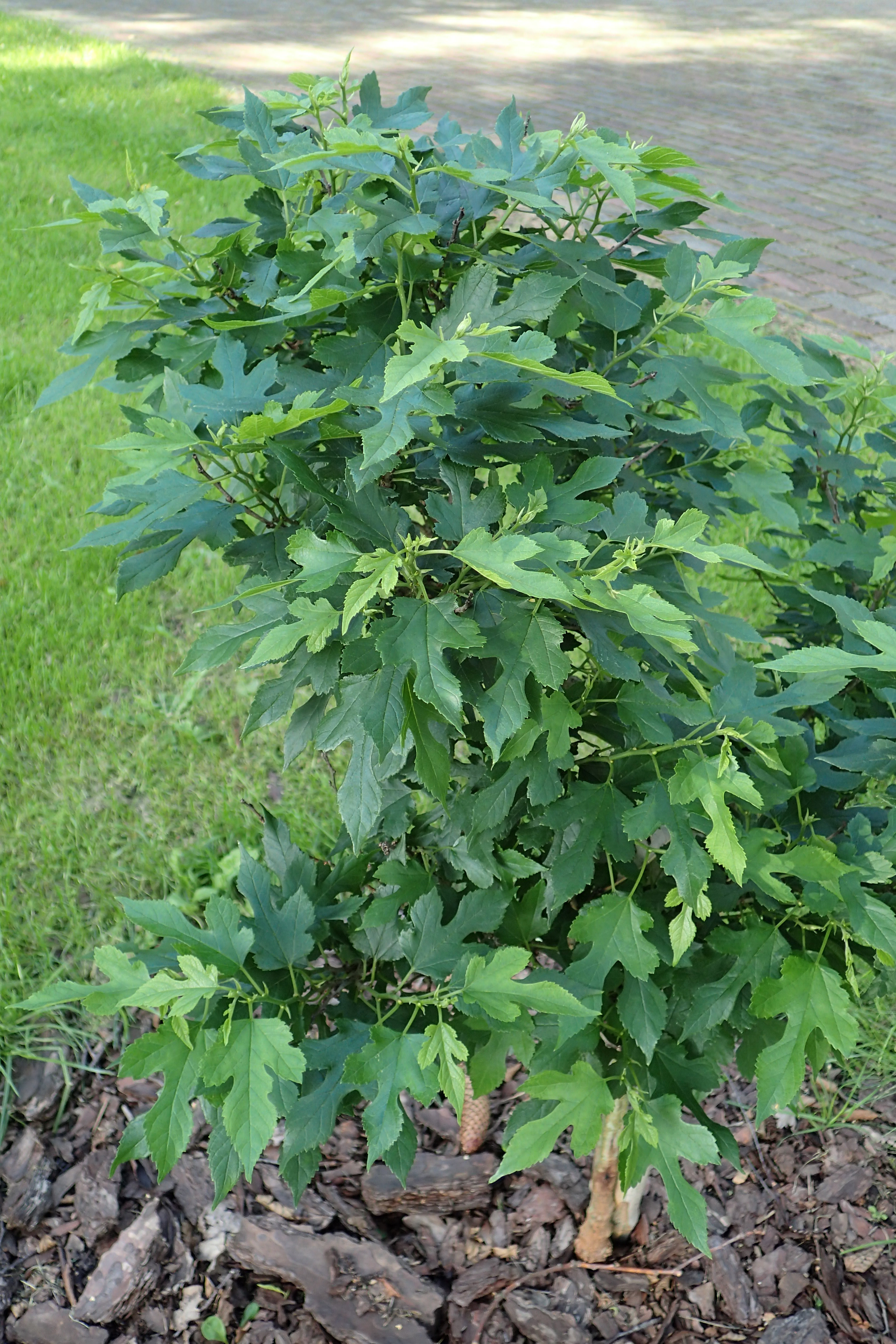
Young tree

The berries are edible and sweet. The first English colonists to explore eastern Virginia in 1607 mentioned the abundance of both mulberry trees and their fruit, which was eaten (sometimes boiled) by the native Powhatan tribes. Today, mulberries are eaten raw, used in the fillings of pastries, and fermented into wine. They are also used for marmalades, liquors, natural dyes, and cosmetics. The berries are not commercially sold because they have very short "shelf lives" and pack/ship very poorly.

The wood may be dried and used for smoking meats with a flavour that is mild and sweet. It is also used for fenceposts because the heartwood is relatively durable. Other uses of the wood include farm implements, cooperage, furniture, interior finish, and caskets.

=== History ===
Some Native American tribes used an infusion of the bark as a laxative or purgative. Infusions of the root were used to treat weakness and urinary ailments. The sap was applied to the skin to treat ringworm. Choctaw people wove clothing from the inner bark of young M. rubra and similar shoots.

Documentations of the use of red mulberry go back to 1500 by the De Soto expedition, which recorded the consumption of dried fruits by the indigenous Muskogee peoples. There were diverse uses of mulberry in different indigenous cultures. Among them, the Cherokee mixed cornmeal and sugar to the berries, to make sweet dumplings. Later on, European settlers also used the mulberry fruits to make pies or preserves. The trees were also important as a source of livestock feed and wood for furniture or boats.

The Choctaw Indians used to prepare a kind of cloth out of the bark of Morus and would produce a yellow dye from the root of the same plant.

=== Cultivation ===
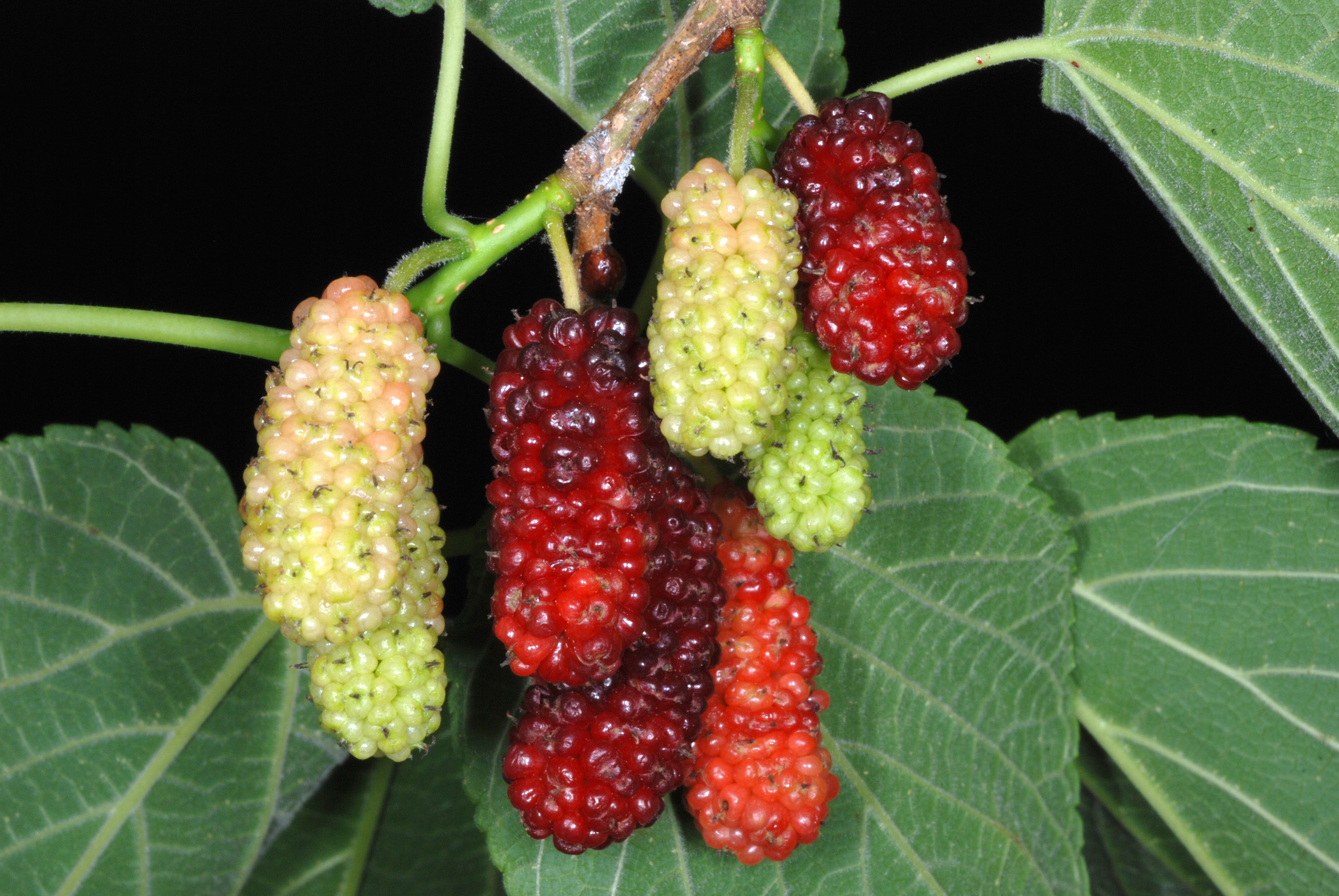
Fruit

In an early stage, pruning is necessary to make the red mulberry tree develop a sturdy framework. Afterwards, the pruning requirements of the red mulberry involve mainly removing dead or overcrowded wood. To keep the tree in a tidy form, it is suggested to choose a few main branches and cut the laterals to six leaves in July. This allows the spurs to develop near the main branches. However, the red mulberry tree tends to bleed after pruning, so pruning should be reduced to a minimum and should be conducted when the tree is dormant, as the bleeding is less severe then. Removing branches of more than two inches in diameter should be absolutely avoided. When tilling the soil, it must be paid attention not to damage the horizontal roots. Cutting them would impair nutrient uptake.

In the first year of a red mulberry's lifetime, a sufficient water supply is critical for the development of the root system. Young mulberry trees should be watered thoroughly twice a week if growing on light soils and once a week if growing on clay soils. Later, the red mulberry is drought tolerant, although under water scarcity it may drop its fruits too early which results in berry yield losses. Thus, for berry production, irrigation is recommended under dry conditions.

Mulching helps to retain moisture in the soil and to reduce the competition with grass and weeds. Thus, it is recommended to apply mulch under mulberry trees. The mulch should not touch the stem as this may lead to rotting. Mulberry trees thrive with little to no fertilizer. Fertilizing more than twice a year should be avoided and fertilizing later than July may lead to freeze damage. An NPK value of 10-10-10 is targeted and depending on the available nutrients in the soil, other nutrients like iron should be added.

Usually, the red mulberry is free from pests and diseases but in some areas the "popcorn disease" may occur. In that case, infected fruits should be collected and burned, to prevent the pathogens population to reproduce and survive for the next season. If cultivated for fruits, male and female plants must be grown, if a monoecious variety is chosen. However, there are also dioecious varieties. To harvest the fruit, branches are usually shaken and the fruit collected manually.

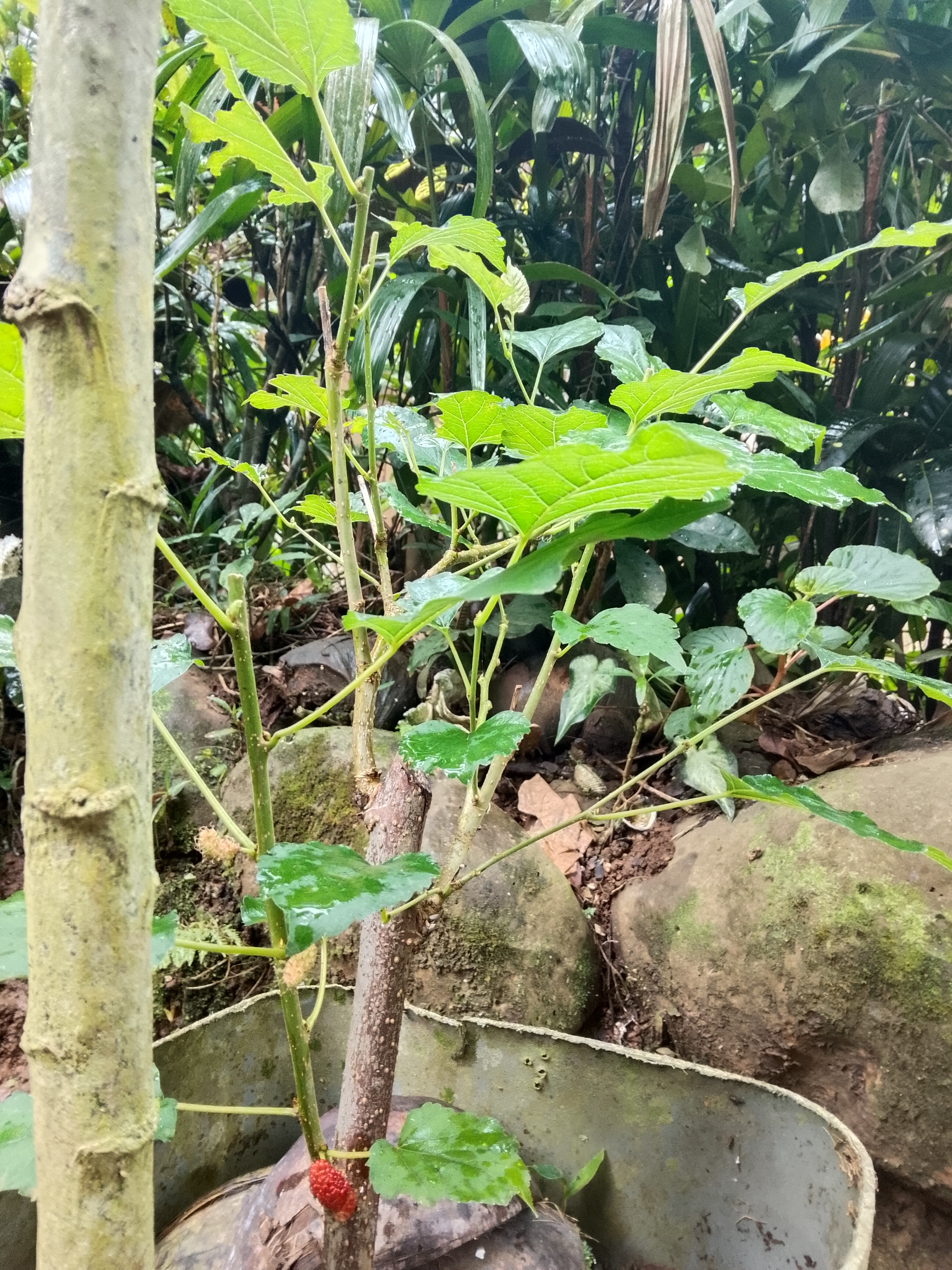
A small potted "Illinois Everbearing" tree producing fruits.

Certain individual selections of M. rubra and its hybrids with M. alba are cultivated for their fruit quality and/or productivity. Due to their vigor and disease resistance, they are often considered an excellent species for farming without pesticide. Some varieties of mulberry with proven M. rubra parentage are:

- Illinois Everbearing
- Kip Parker
- Miss Kim
- Oscar
- Silk Hope
- World's Best
- Varaha

There have been other selections of black-colored mulberries discovered in the United States with probable M. rubra parentage (Collier, Shangri La, Wellington, etc.).

=== Climatic and soil requirements ===
Mulberry grows in various climatic conditions and can be found in climates between temperate and tropical. Red mulberry plants require a total annual rainfall of 1,000–2,000 mm (39–79 in) and are adapted to altitudes of up to 800 m (2,600 ft). The native environment of red mulberry most often consists of moist forests, thickets on floodplains, moist hillsides and river banks.

It can tolerate short periods of flooding and can tolerate temperatures as low as −36 °C (−33 °F). Optimal growing temperatures are between 24 and 28 °C (75 and 82 °F). At least 140 frost free days a year are required. Normally, the tree grows in full sun, but growth is also possible in partial shading. Red mulberry is also drought tolerant.

In its native habitat, red mulberry grows in mesic hardwood forests in moist soils, although they can be found in many different moist soils. Such soils include inceptisols, alfisols, spodosols and ultisols. The plants prefer deep, well drained soils that range from loamy to clayey and have a high moisture-holding capacity. A soil pH of 5-7 is optimal.

=== Yield ===
Mulberries yield wood for timber, with an average 10–15 m (33–49 ft) height and diameter of 50 cm (20 in). The timber volume is 0.962 m^{3} to 1.435 m^{3}.

Only two to three years after whip cultivar plantation, the tree should already start to fruit. The yields of fruits should reach 3–5 kg (6.6–11.0 lb) (per tree per year) during the first years until 300 kg (660 lb) for a mature tree.

== Economic aspects ==
In 2015, almost 3.4 million pounds of frozen mulberries were imported to the US – a market value of 2.6 million US dollars. The demand for the fruit is still rising and the prices are high. This constitutes a great opportunity for mulberry producers. It takes ten years from the seedling stage, until a mulberry tree bears fruit. Thus, for the decision of building up a mulberry orchard, one needs to estimate not the current demand but the market potential of ten years later. This involves more risk and long-term planning. However, there are grafted varieties that produce fruit earlier and reduce this problem.

In future, the economic viability of mulberry production may increase even more as its drought resistance constitutes an opportunity for agriculture under climate change and as the fruit contains many micronutrients and vitamins, while people pay more and more attention to healthy nutrition.

As mulberry production is not yet mechanized well, a lot of labor is required, especially to harvest the fruit. However, there is potential for mechanizing the shaking of the branches, as in tart cherry harvesting. A difficulty in the commercial use of mulberries is the fragility of the berries which constitutes a challenge in storage and transport. The leading producers of mulberry fruit are Turkey and Iran. They are the main mulberry suppliers to Europe. However, they mainly produce white and black mulberry - thus, the production of red mulberry is still less widespread.

Agroforestry constitutes an opportunity to further improve the viability of red mulberry cultivation. Short-duration legume crops as intercrops improves the soil, controls weeds, and creates additional revenue.

== Limitations to cultivation ==
Red mulberry has not been widely cultivated in much of the world, due to several undesirable characteristics:

- The red mulberry cannot be used for silk production, unlike the white mulberry. Silkworms reject the leaves of the red mulberry.
- Red mulberry trees do not begin producing fruit for about ten years after planting. The highest yields are obtained after 30–85 years. Planting for berry production thus requires significant long-term investment before economic payout.
- Despite its drought tolerance, the red mulberry may drop fruits prematurely if the roots are drought-stressed.
- The fruits are delicate which complicates packing and shipping.
- Sensitive people may be confronted with dermatitis when touching the leaves, the stem, or the unripe fruits of a mulberry tree. The leaf sap and unripe fruits can even lead to hallucinations and central nervous system disturbances.
- The fruits are attractive to several mammal and bird species, requiring costly and complex pest prevention strategies for such large trees.
- Breeding takes long due to the long generation time.
- Although they are resistant to many pathogens, there are some diseases that can affect mulberry trees. Common pests and diseases include mulberry leaf spot, bacterial blight (bacterium – Pseudomonas syringae pv. mori), powdery mildew (fungi – Phyllactinia corylea and Uncinula geniculata) or different root rot diseases.
