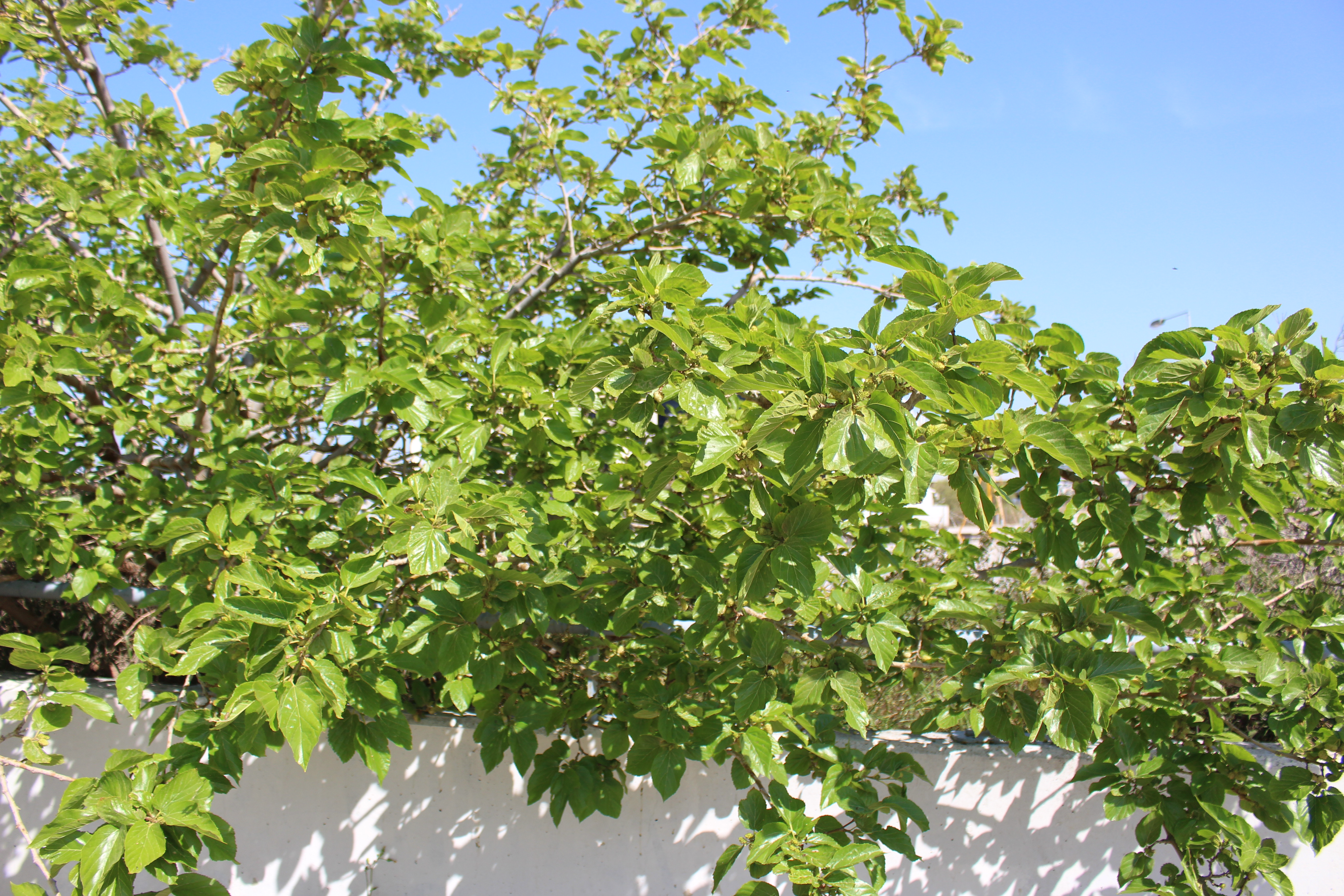

Conservation status
- Least Concern (IUCN 3.1)

Scientific classification
- Kingdom: Plantae
- Clade: Tracheophytes
- Clade: Angiosperms
- Clade: Eudicots
- Clade: Rosids
- Order: Rosales
- Family: Moraceae
- Genus: Morus
- Species: M. alba

Binomial name
- Morus alba L.

Synonyms
- List: Morus colombassa Dippel; Morus constantinopolitana Poir.; Morus cucullata Bonaf.; Morus dulcis Royle; Morus fastigiata Dippel; Morus furcata Steud.; Morus guzziola Steud.; Morus heterophylla Loudon; Morus hispanica Loudon; Morus intermedia Perr.; Morus italica Poir.; Morus kaki Lavallée; Morus levasseurei Lavallée; Morus lhou (Ser.) Koidz.; Morus lucida Loudon; Morus macrophylla Moretti; Morus mariettii Steud.; Morus membranacea Steud.; Morus morettiana Lodd. ex Loudon; Morus morettii Audib. ex Bureau; Morus multicaulis Perr.; Morus nana Audib. ex Loisel.; Morus nervosa Loudon; Morus nigriformis (Bureau) Koidz.; Morus patavia Audib. ex Dippel; Morus patavina Spach; Morus pumila Balb.; Morus romana Lodd. ex Spach; Morus serotina Mart. ex Bureau; Morus sinensis G.Don; Morus subalba Steud.; Morus tatarica L.; Morus tokwa (Bureau) K.Koch; Morus tortuosa Audib. ex Moretti; Morus venassainii Steud.; Morus venosa (Delile) Spach

= Morus alba =

White mulberry Temporal range: Eocene–Present

Plant species in the fig family

Morus alba, known as white mulberry, common mulberry and silkworm mulberry, is a fast-growing, small to medium-sized mulberry tree which grows to 10–20 m (33–66 ft) tall. It is native to China and is widely cultivated and naturalized elsewhere. The species is widely cultivated to feed the silkworms employed in the commercial production of silk. It is also notable for the rapid release of its pollen, which is launched at greater than half the speed of sound.

The specific Latin epithet alba refers to white.

== Description ==
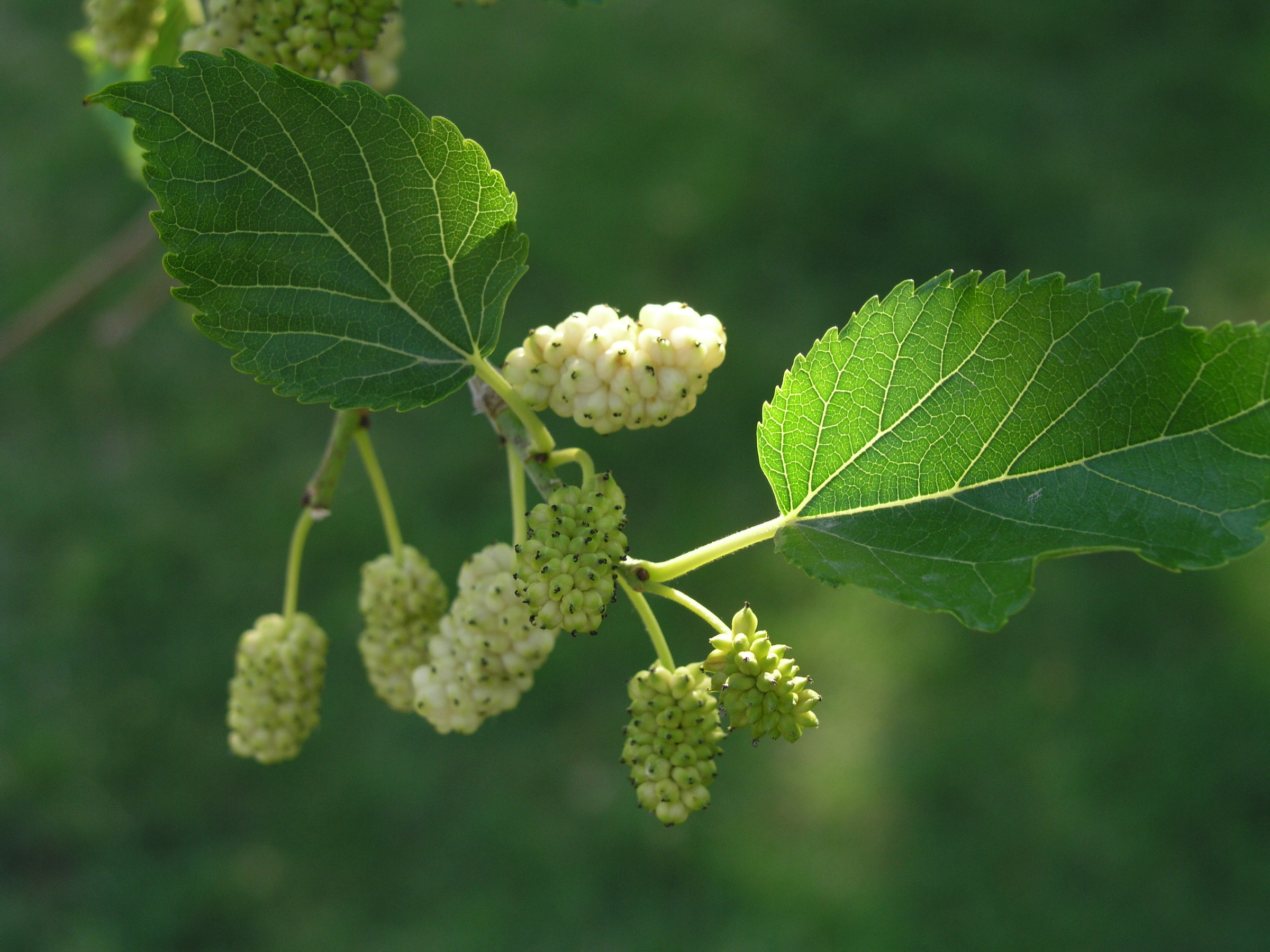
Leaves and fruit

The tree can grow to 15 metres (50 ft) tall. It is generally a short-lived tree with a lifespan comparable to that of humans, although there are some specimens known to be more than 250 years old. Generally, the trees are deciduous in temperate regions, but trees grown in tropical regions may be evergreen. On young, vigorous shoots, the leaves may be up to 30 cm (12 in) long, and deeply and intricately lobed, with the lobes rounded. On mature trees, the leaves are generally 5–13 cm (2–5 in) long, unlobed, cordate at the base and rounded to acuminate at the tip, and serrated on the margins.

The flowers are single-sex catkins; male catkins are 2–3.5 cm (3/4–1 1/2 in) long, and female catkins 1–2 cm (1/2–3/4 in) long. Male and female flowers are usually found on separate trees although they may occur on the same tree. The fruit is 1–1.5 cm (1/2–1/2 in) long. In the wild it is deep purple, but in many cultivated plants it varies from white to pink. It is sweet but often insipid, unlike the more intense flavor of the red mulberry and black mulberry. The seeds are widely dispersed in the droppings of birds that eat the fruit.

The white mulberry is scientifically notable for the rapid plant movement involved in pollen release from its catkins. The stamens act as catapults, releasing stored elastic energy in just 25 μs. The resulting movement is approximately 380 miles per hour (610 km/h), about half the speed of sound, making it the fastest known movement in the plant kingdom.

== Taxonomy ==
Two varieties of Morus alba are recognized:

- Morus alba var. alba
- Morus alba var. multicaulis

== Distribution and habitat ==
The species is native to China and India and is widely cultivated and naturalized elsewhere (including the United States, Mexico, Australia, Kyrgyzstan, Argentina, Turkey, Iran, Iraq, among others).

It is widely naturalized in disturbed areas such as roadsides and the edges of tree lots, along with urban areas in much of North America, where it hybridizes readily with the locally native red mulberry (Morus rubra). There is now serious concern for the long-term genetic viability of the red mulberry because of extensive hybridization in some areas.

The species is now extensively planted and widely naturalized throughout the warm temperate world and in subarctic regions as well, and would survive in elevations as high as 4,000 metres (13,000 ft). They thrive in mildly acidic, well-drained, sandy loam and clayey loam soils, though they can withstand poor soils as well.

== Cultivation ==
Mulberry cultivation is generally found in both tropical and temperate regions, although the temperature of 24-28 °C is ideal for cultivating mulberry. Mulberry thrives from 28 °N and 55 °N latitude under varying climatic conditions ranging from temperate and tropical situated north of the equator. It grows well in areas where annual rainfall varies between 600 and 2,500 millimetres (24 and 98 in) with a minimum of nine to 13 hours of sunshine per day. Mulberry can be grown up to 4,000 m (13,000 ft) above sea level. Mulberry blooms well in warm, rich, fertile, well-drained, loamy to clayey soils, porous with strong moisture-holding ability. The optimal soil pH range is 6.2–6.8. Because mulberry is a hardy crop, the soil moisture can be used to a greater extent by these plants. However, the analysis of India's soils stated that the status of sodium (Na), potassium (K), and phosphorus (P) should be set. When some deviation occurs then the insects or fungi will attack mulberry plants.

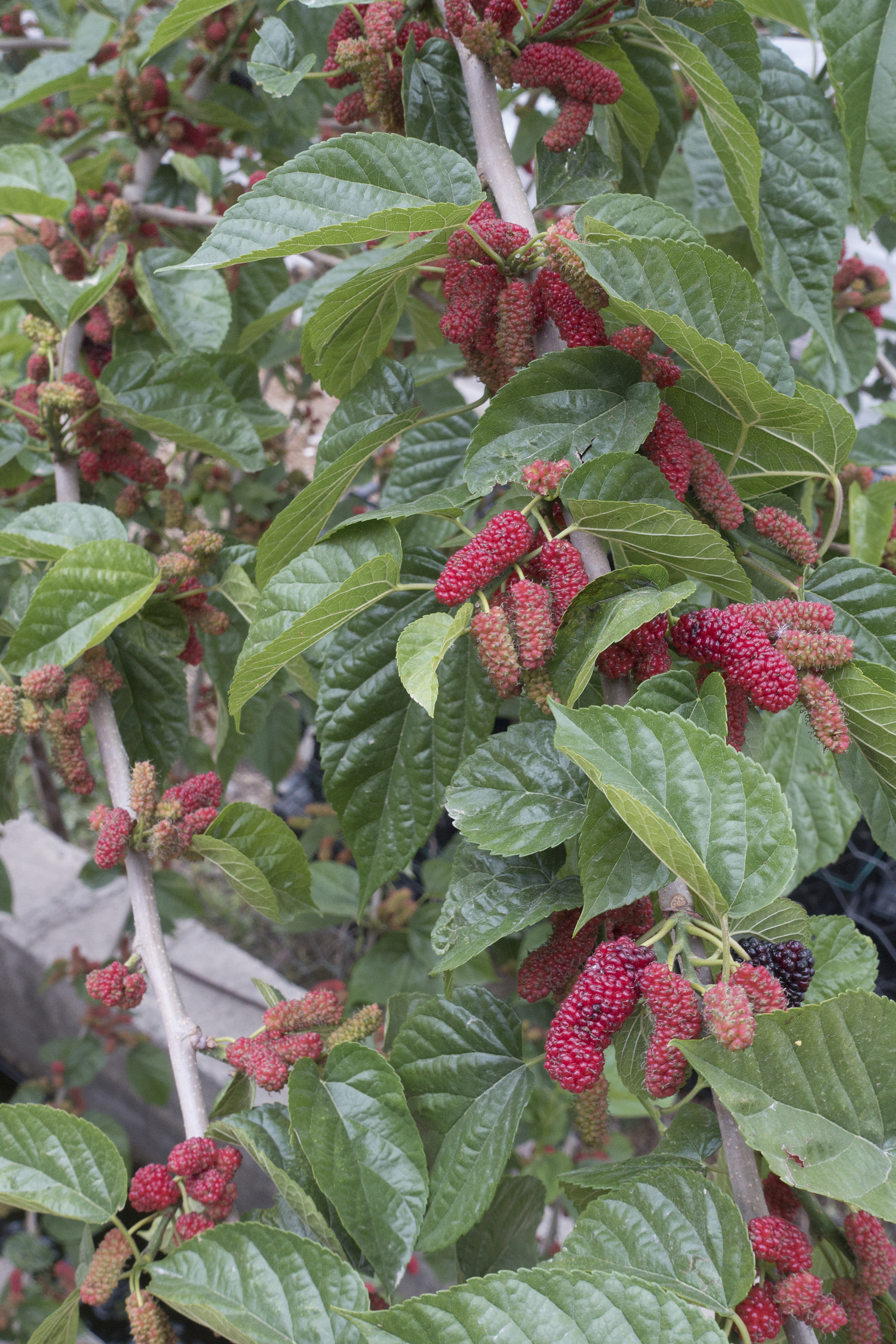
Unknown mulberry variety with probable M. alba parentage.

Mulberry is well-suited for cultivation due to its vigorous nature and natural disease resistance, with many of its parts, including bark and leaves, containing antimicriobial and antifungal compounds. While it can be grown from seed, propagation is usually done through stem cutting or grafting. Depending on what the mulberry trees are used for, production of fodder, timber, leaves for silkworms or fruit, several cultivation systems are possible, such as hedges, trees or pollarded trees.

M. alba and its hybrids with M. rubra and M. macroura have been bred and selected for fruit production. These selections are some of the most widely cultivated mulberries globally. As such, different varieties are adapted to different conditions and tend to perform poorly outside of their preferred climate. Varieties include:

- Beautiful Day
- Big White
- Black Prince
- Chiang Mai
- Four Seasons
- Galicia
- Gerardi Dwarf
- Illinois Everbearing
- Kokuso
- Mapleleaf
- Miss Kim
- Oscar
- Pendula
- Shangri-La
- Shelli
- Silk Hope
- Thai Dwarf
- Tice
- Wellington
- World's Best

=== History ===
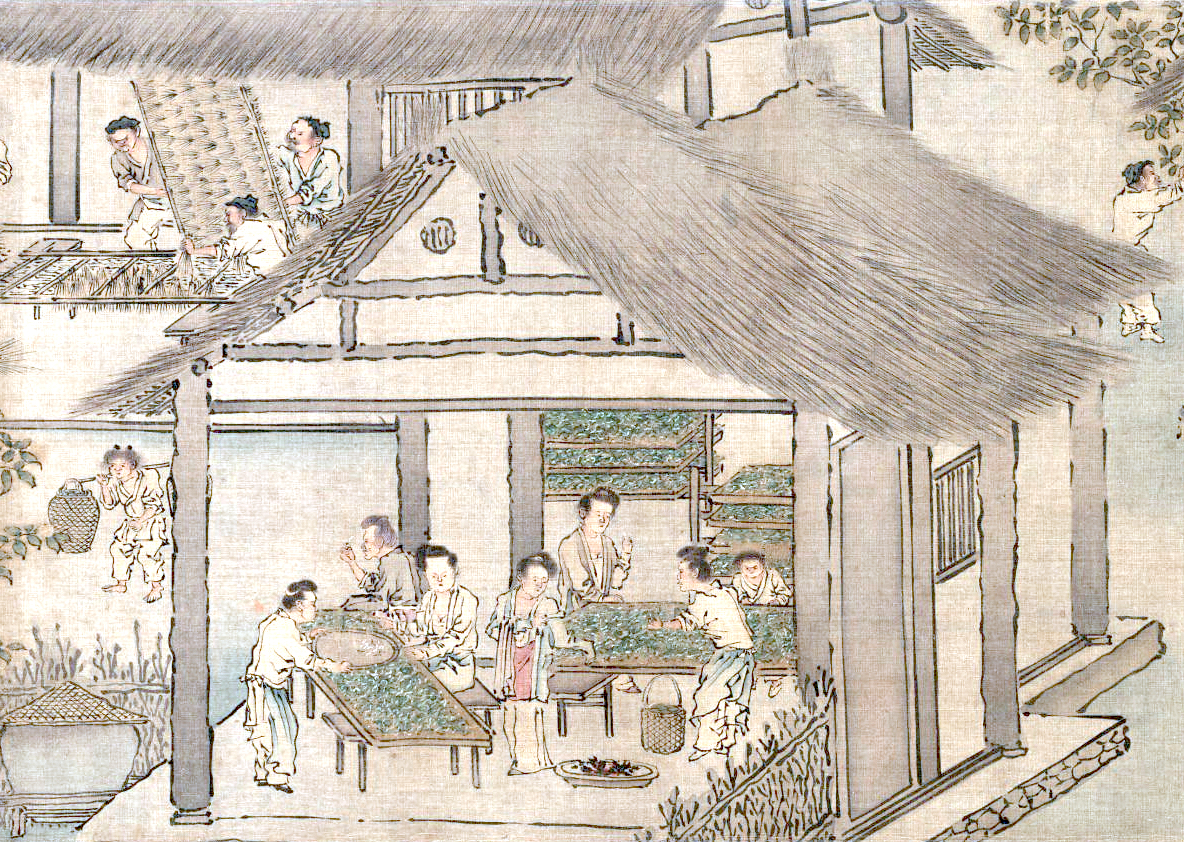
Mulberry leaves placed on trays with silkworms (Liang Kai's Sericulture c. 1200s)

Cultivation of white mulberry to nourish silkworms began more than 4,700 years ago in China and has since been introduced in other countries. The Ancient Greeks and Romans cultivated the mulberry for silkworms. At least as early as 220 AD, Emperor Elagabalus wore a silk robe. It was introduced into other parts of Europe in the twelfth century and into Latin America after the Spanish conquest in the fifteenth century. In 2002, 6,260 km^{2} of land were devoted to the species in China.

It has been grown widely from the Indian subcontinent west through Afghanistan and Iran to southern Europe for more than a thousand years for leaves to feed silkworms.

== Toxicity ==
Tests on laboratory rats have not found mulberry extract to present significant toxicity.

According to a coroner's report, Lori McClintock, wife of US politician Tom McClintock, died in December 2021 from dehydration due to gastroenteritis caused by "adverse effects of white mulberry leaf ingestion"; the leaf is used as a dietary supplement or herbal remedy for weight loss and diabetes. However, many experts questioned this conclusion, citing numerous safety studies.

== Uses ==
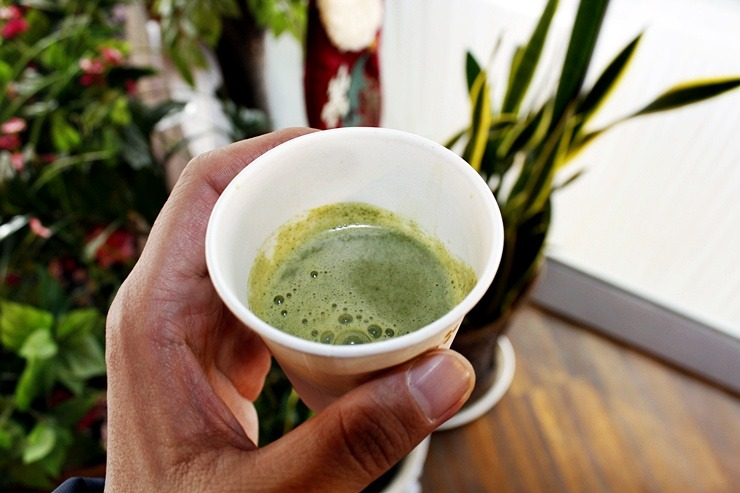
Ppongnip-cha (mulberry leaf tea)

=== Leaves ===
White mulberry leaves are the preferred feedstock for silkworms (Bombyx mori), and sericulture was therefore one of the main reasons of the expansion of the cultivation of this tree. White mulberry are also cut to feed livestock (cattle, goats, etc.) because of its interesting properties. Mulberry could be a viable alternative for fodder production as it is rich in protein and energy, and has a high degree of digestibility, in addition to being a fast and vigorous growing plant. Furthermore, the polyphenolic content of the leaves could have a positive impact on animals health and at the same time reducing their methane emissions.

The leaves are prepared as tea in Korea. In Asia leaves are also consumed for medical purposes, which are used as an anti-hyperglycemic supplement for diabetes patients. In traditional Chinese medicine, bark, leaves and the fruits are used to treat fever, lower blood pressure, protect liver damage, improve eyesight, and facilitate discharge of urine.

=== Fruits ===
The fruit are also viable for human consumption. They can be eaten fresh, and they are appreciated for their sweet taste, but the fragile skin of the fruits makes storage and marketing difficult. Nevertheless, the fruit can be processed in several ways to ensure its preservation, such as dried, made into syrups, wines or spirits. For example, in Azerbaijan, where the mulberries are part of the culture, the fruits are transformed into a dense syrup called "doshab" or "bakmaz"; or transformed into a potent liqueur, called "tut araghi". In China the fruits are transformed into a paste called sangshengao, which is used to make tea.

=== Trunk ===
Its bark is rich in fiber, making it well-suited for producing rayon and paper. Mulberry paper is strong and durable, which made it a preferred material for traditional Chinese painting paper in ancient times. In India, mulberry wood is used to make sports equipment, furniture, household utensils and agricultural implements.

=== Landscaping ===
For landscaping, a fruitless mulberry was developed from a clone for use in the production of silk in the U.S. The industry never materialized, but the mulberry variety is now used as an ornamental tree where shade is desired without the fruit. White mulberry, Morus alba 'Pendula', is used as an ornamental plant. It was planted at several grand stations built along the Lackawanna Railroad in New Jersey during the late 1800s and early 1900s. The species is a lawn tree across the desert cities of the southwestern United States, prized for its shade and also for its cylindrical berry clusters composed of sweet, purplish-white fruits. The plant's pollen is problematic in some cities where it has been blamed for an increase in hay fever.

== Chinese myth ==
According to the Chinese myth Silk Horse in Anecdotes about Spirits and Immortals, the origin of the mulberry tree is linked to a tragic legend. A woman, grieving her missing husband, promised her daughter in marriage to whoever brought him back. When the husband returned with the help of a horse, she felt bound by her vow. Enraged, the husband killed the horse and hung its hide outside. The daughter then mysteriously disappeared, and was later found transformed into silk, while the horse's skin had become a cocoon hanging from a mulberry tree. Because the Chinese word for mulberry (桑) is a homophone of mourning (喪), the tree was said to have been named in association with sorrow and loss.

== Gallery ==
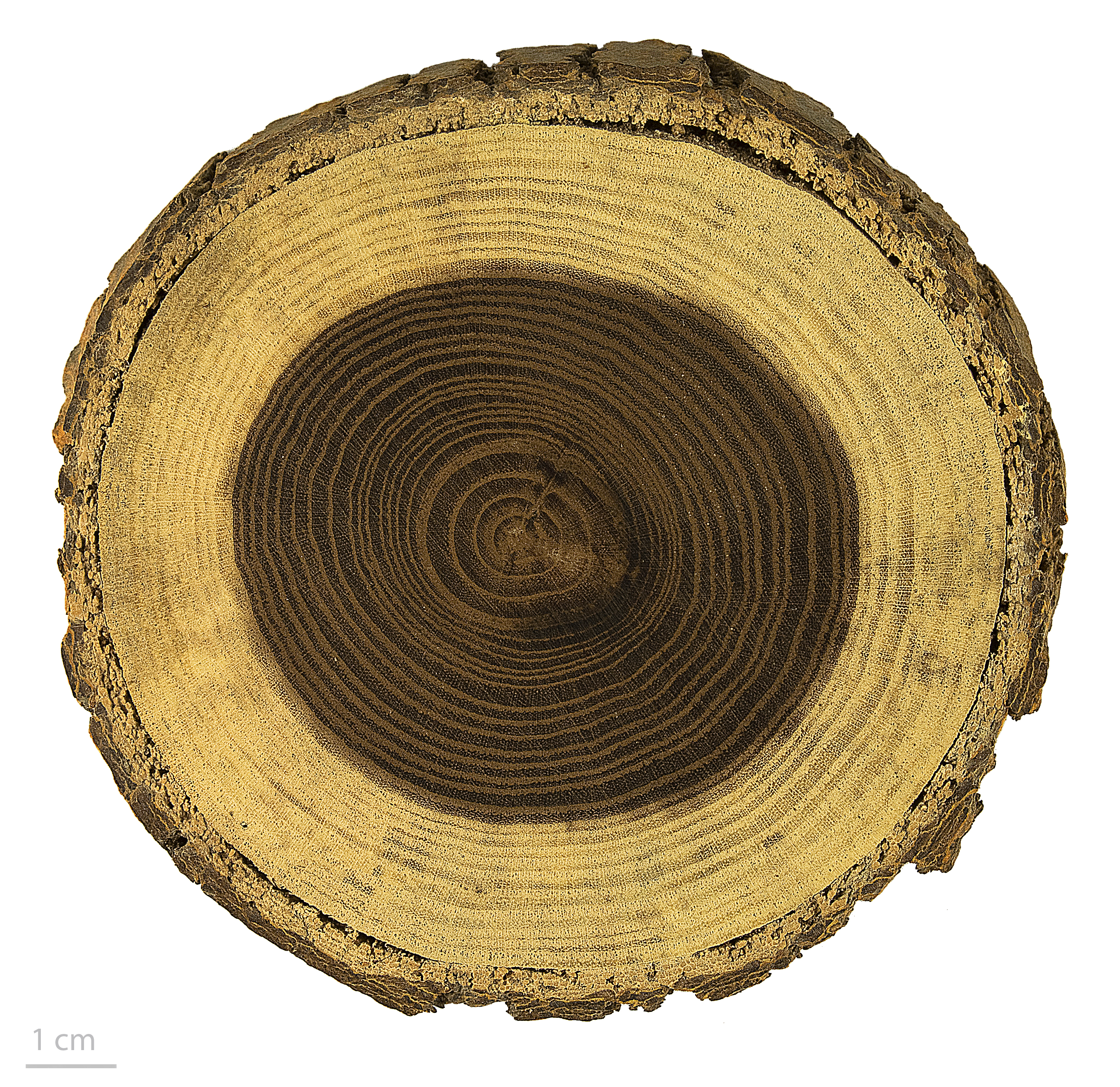
Morus alba - MHNT

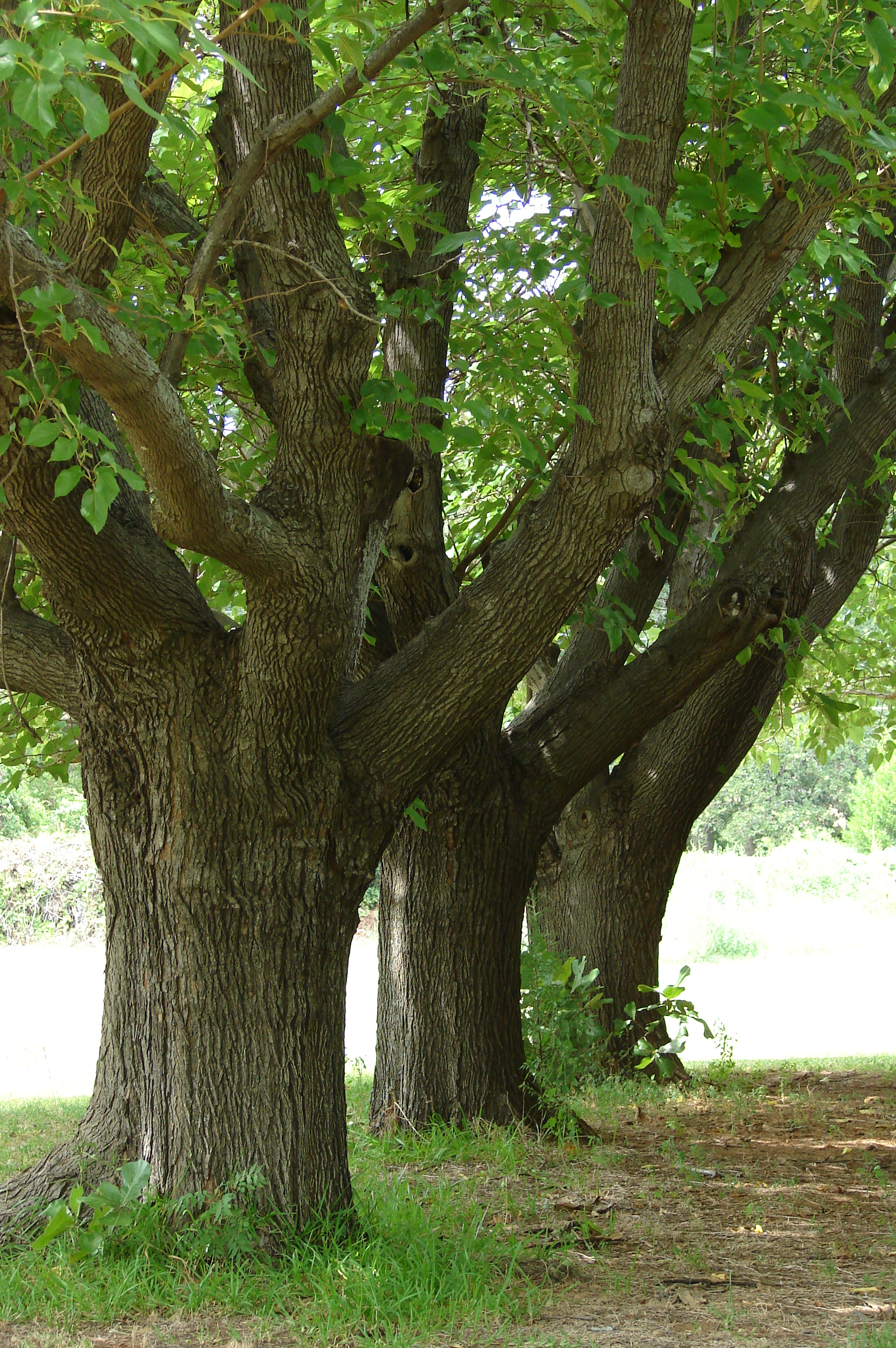
Fruitless mulberry trees

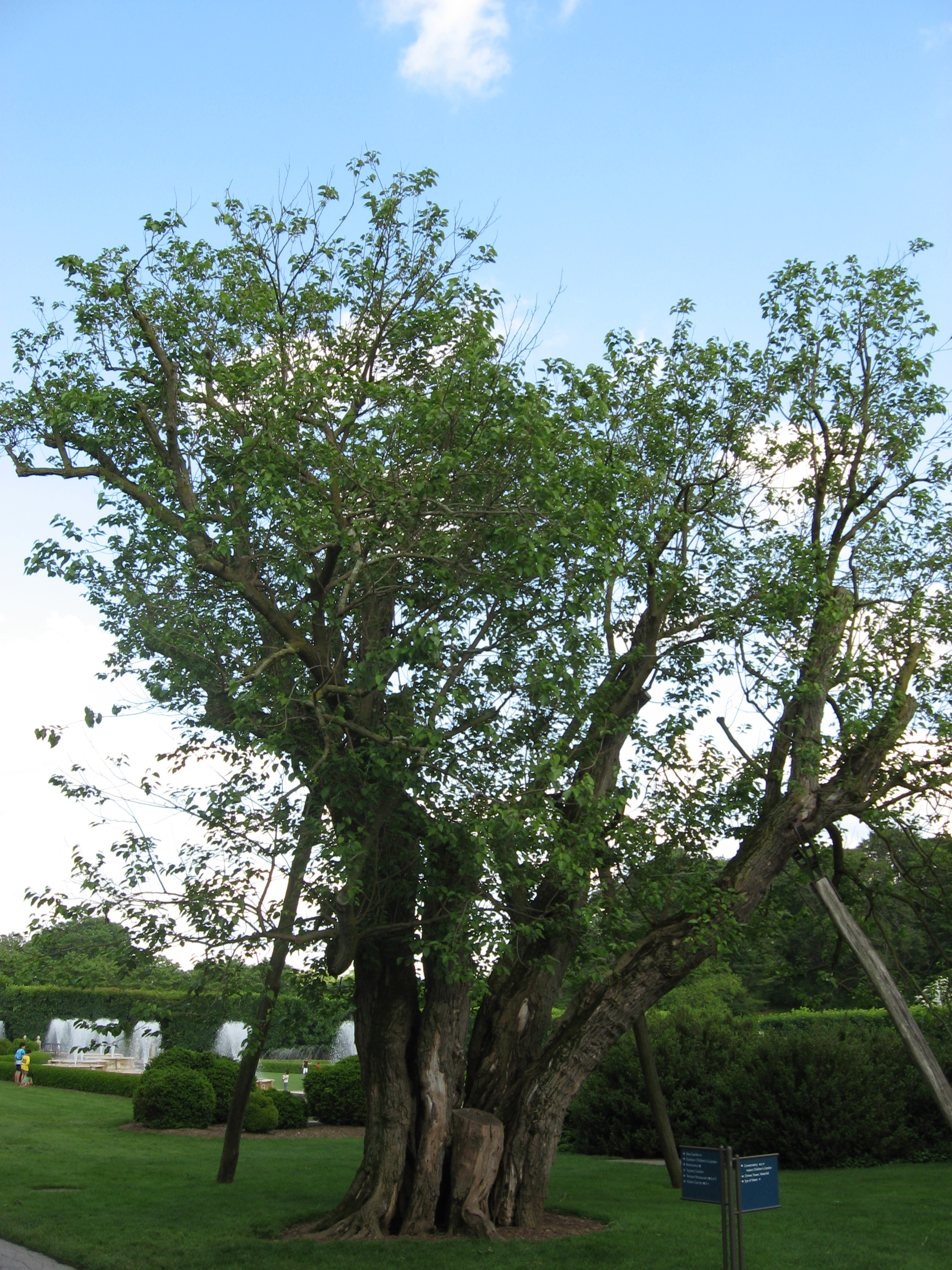
Pennsylvania state champion Morus alba at Longwood Gardens

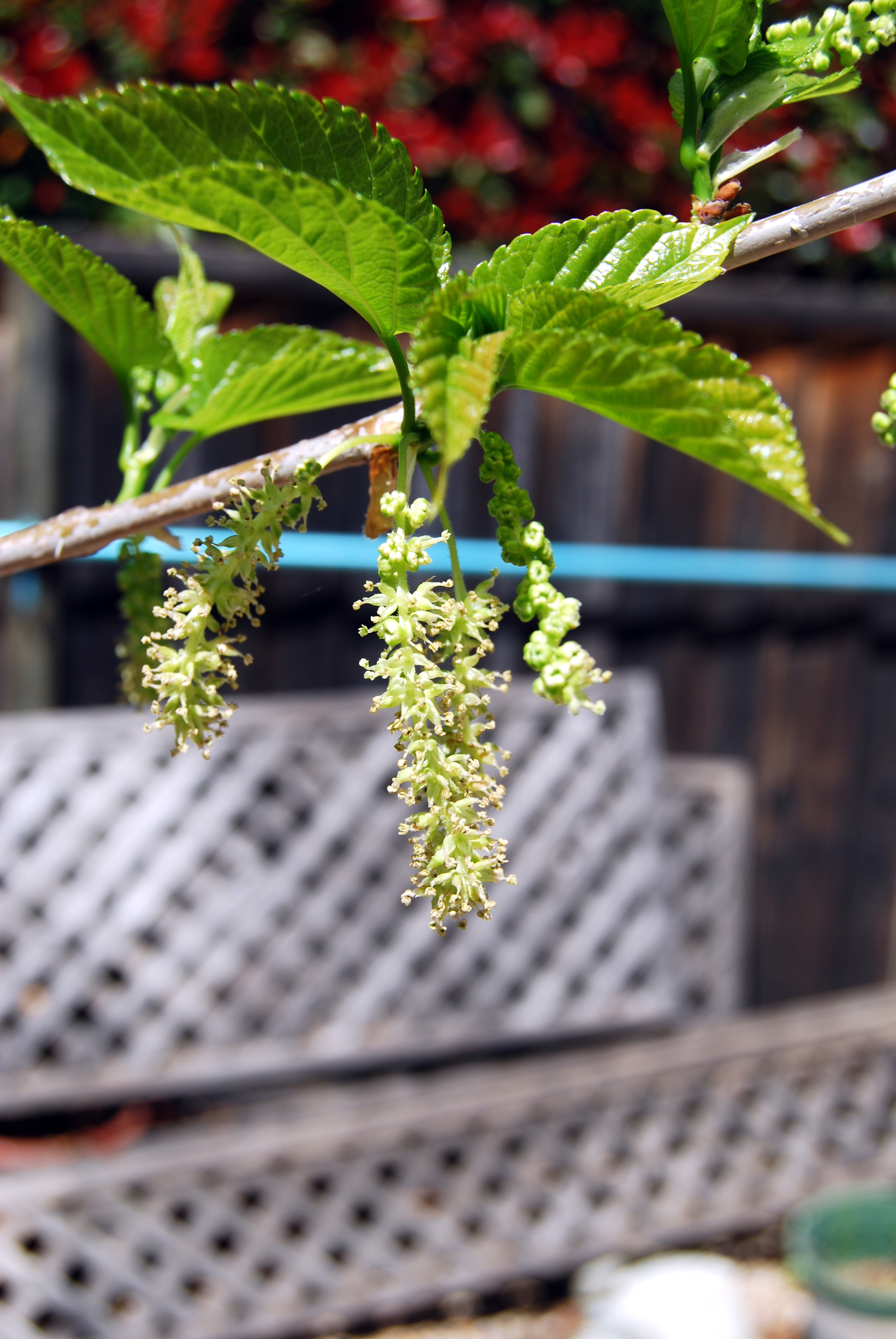
Leaves and male flowers in spring

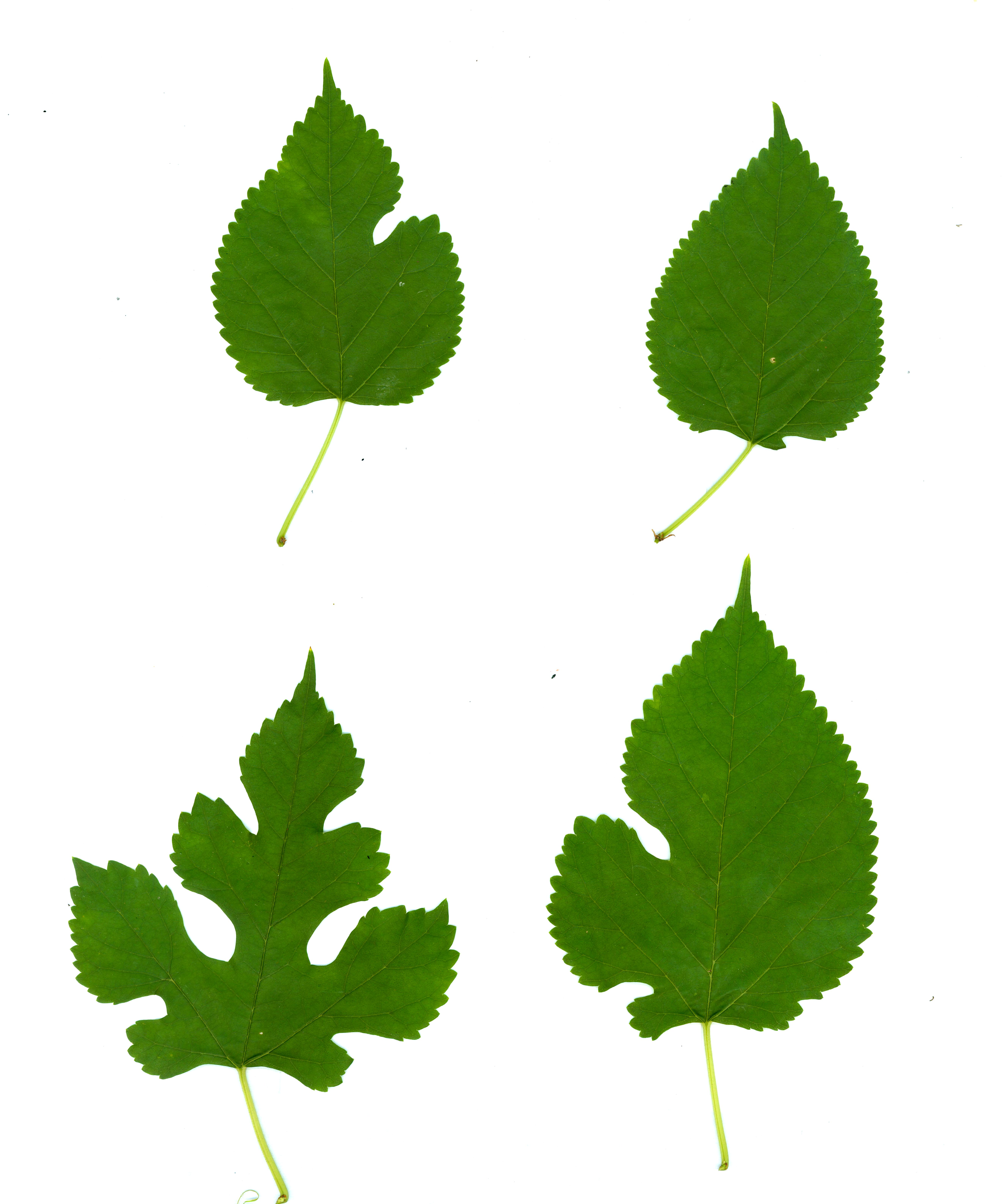
Leaf variation

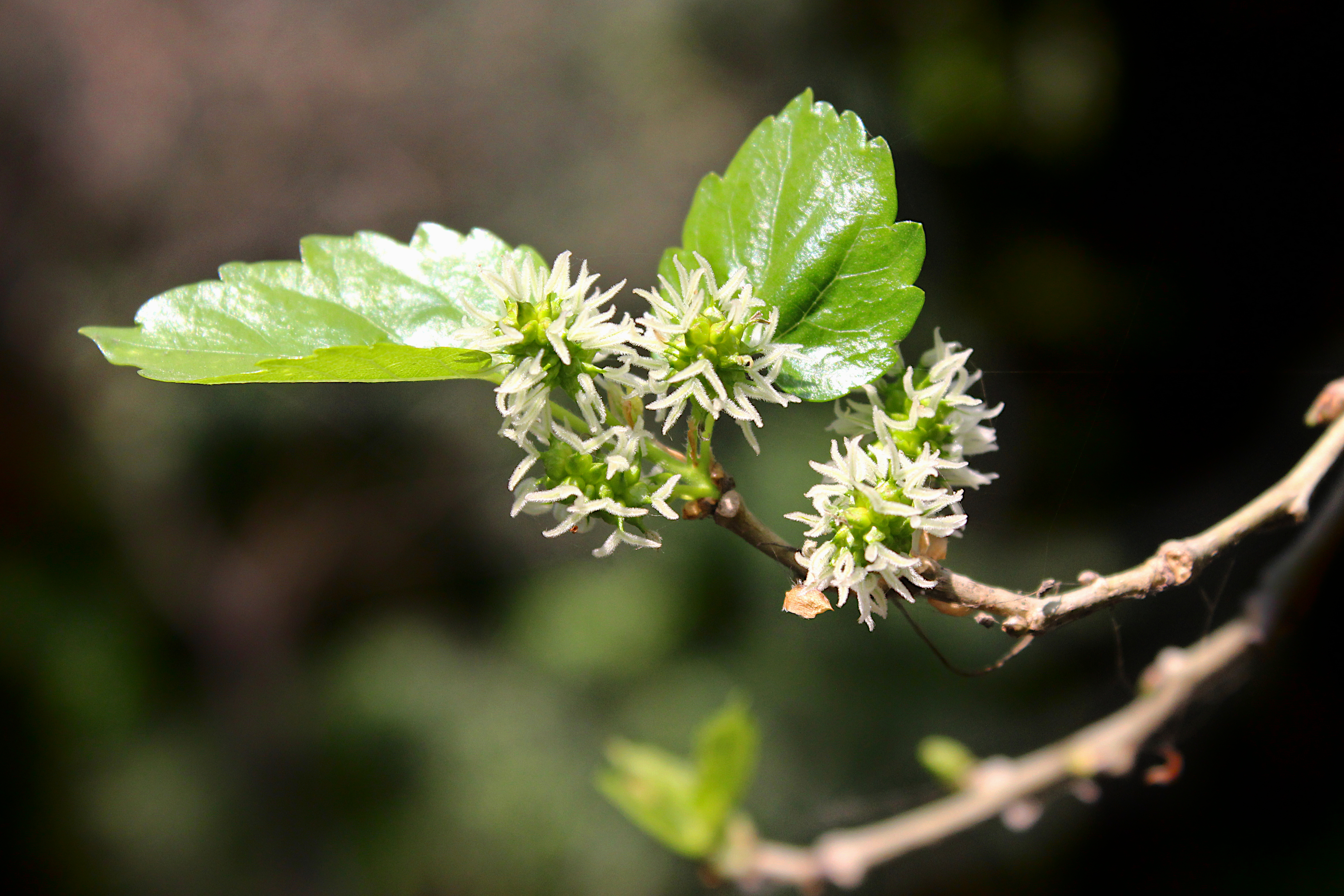
Morus alba flowers in India

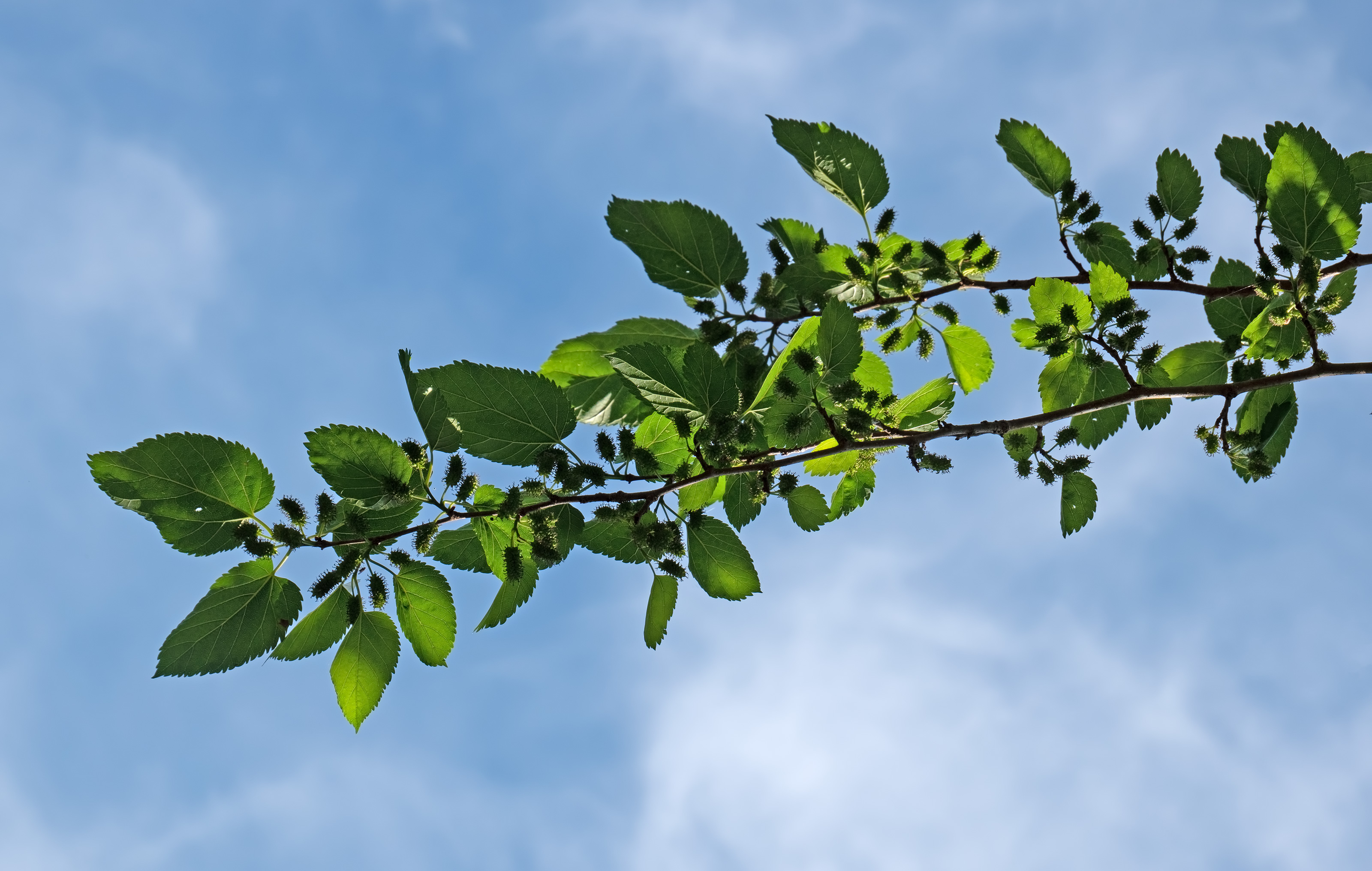
Flowers and leaves in Spain

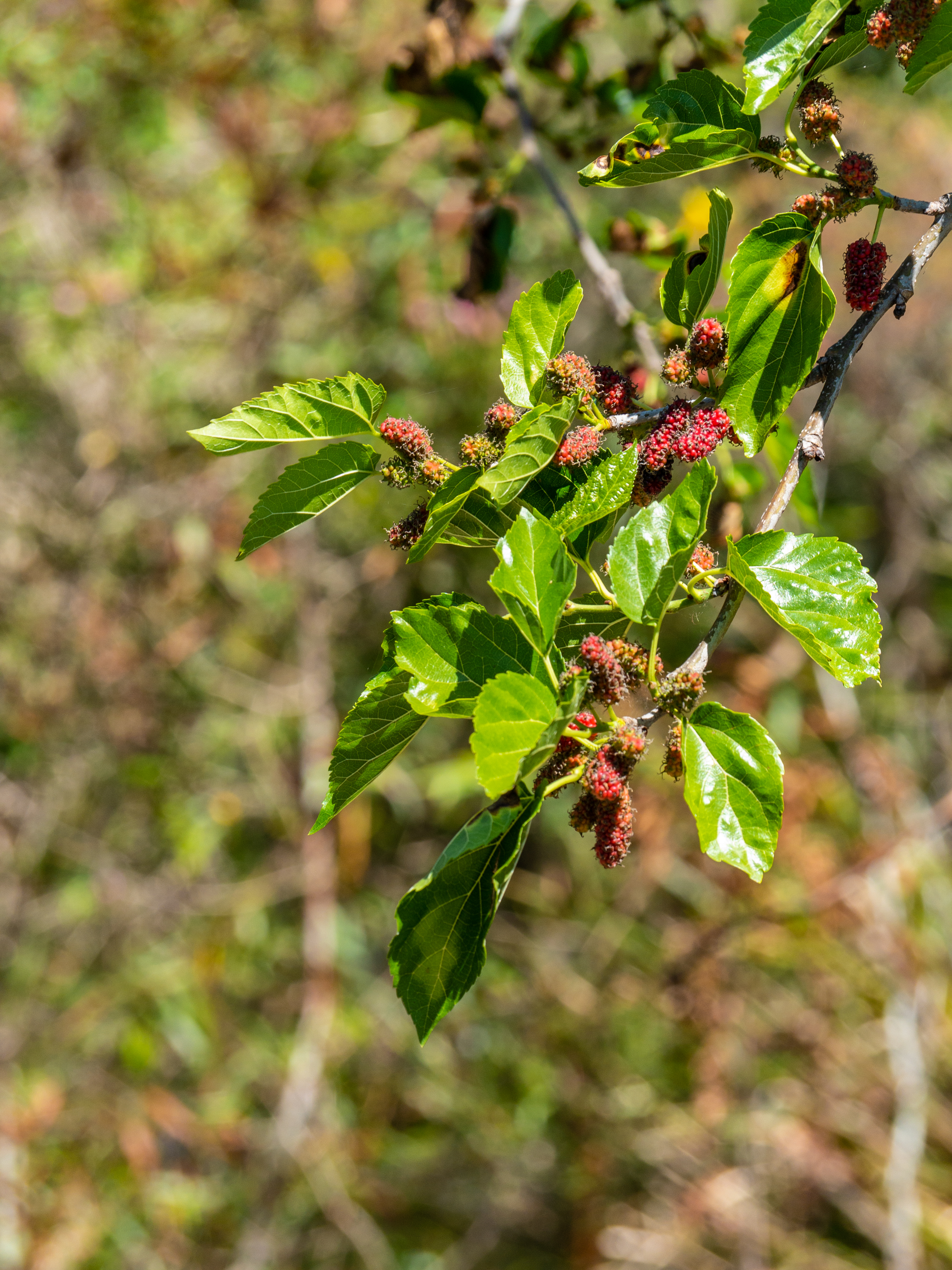
Fruits in India

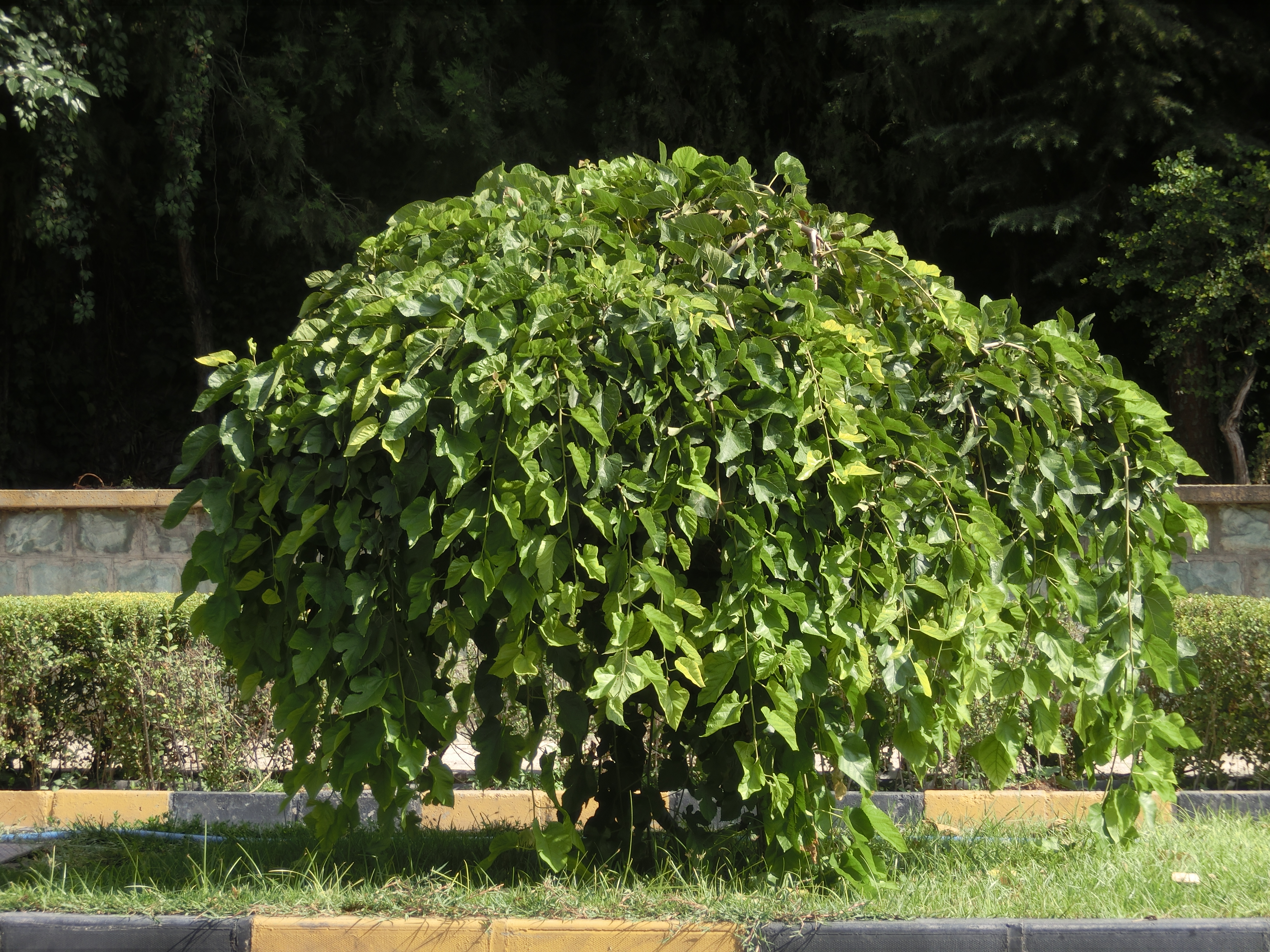
'Pendula' cultivar in Iran

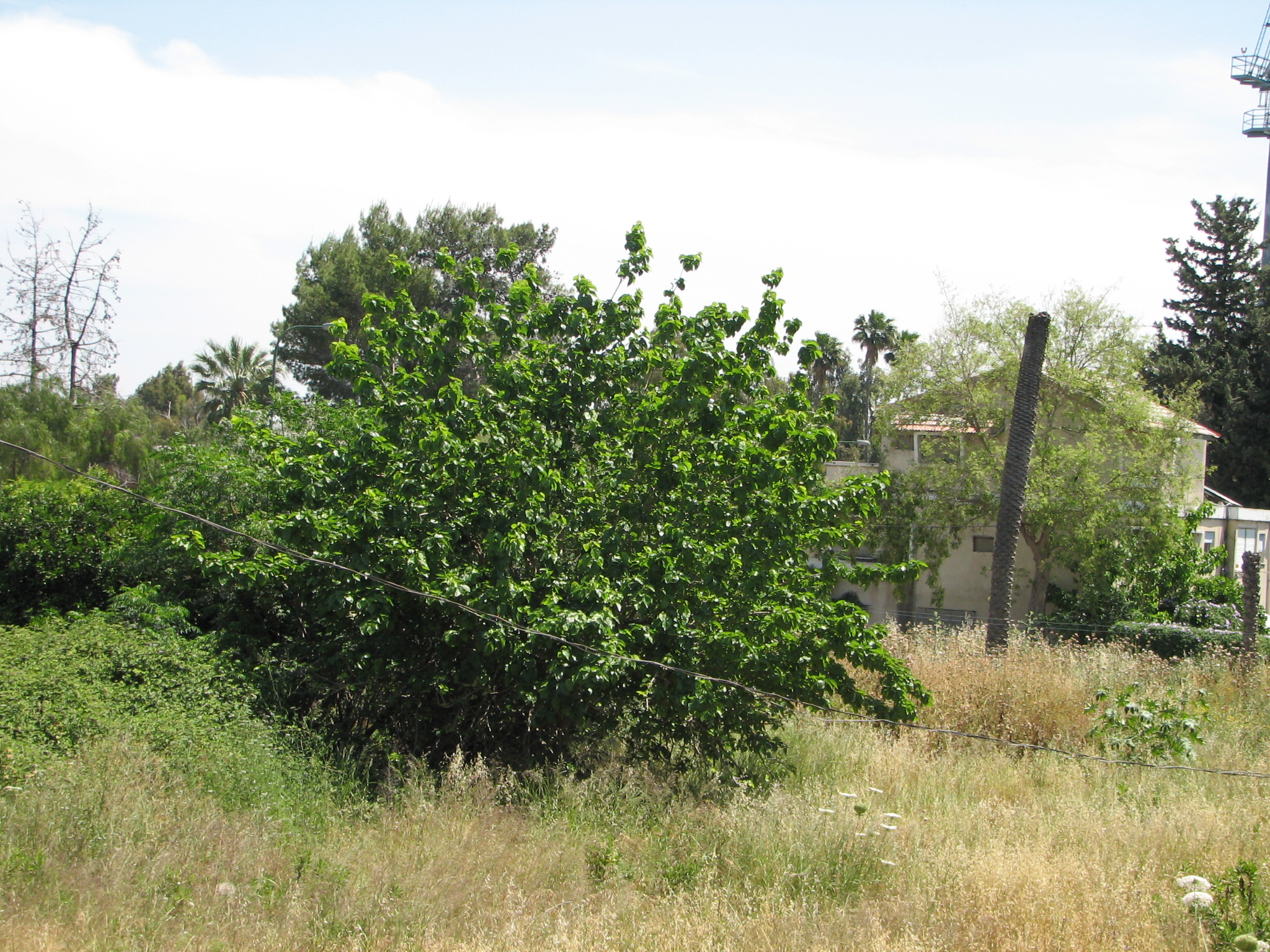
A tree planted by Edmond James de Rothschild in 1922 in attempt to build silk industry in Israel

== See also ==
- Blackberry, which has similar-looking fruit
- Mulberrofuran G
- Sericulture, silk farming
- Osage orange
