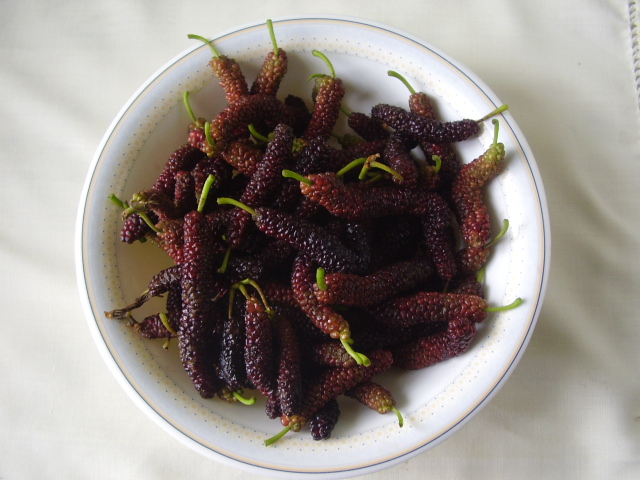

Conservation status
- Least Concern (IUCN 3.1)

Scientific classification
- Kingdom: Plantae
- Clade: Tracheophytes
- Clade: Angiosperms
- Clade: Eudicots
- Clade: Rosids
- Order: Rosales
- Family: Moraceae
- Genus: Morus
- Species: M. macroura

Binomial name
- Morus macroura Miq. (1851)

Varieties
- Morus macroura var. laxiflora G.K.Upadhyay & A.A.Ansari; Morus macroura var. macroura; Morus macroura var. mawu (Koidz.) C.Y.Wu & Z.Y.Cao

Synonyms
- synonyms of var. macroura: Morus alaisia Deless. ex Moretti, pro syn.; Morus alba var. laevigata Bureau; Morus alba subvar. viridis Bureau; Morus jinpingensis S.S.Chang; Morus laevigata (Bureau) Wall. ex Brandis; Morus macroura var. viridis (Bureau) K.K.Khanna; Morus viridis Buch.-Ham. ex Wall., nom. nud.; Morus wallichiana Koidz.; Morus wittiorum Hand.-Mazz.; synonyms of var. mawu: Morus wittiorum var. mawu Koidz.

= Morus macroura =

Species of tree

Morus macroura, also known as the king white mulberry, shahtoot mulberry, Tibetan mulberry, or long mulberry is a flowering plant species in the genus Morus native to the Himalayas, Tibet, southern China, the rain forests of Indochina, and mountainous areas of Sumatra and Java in Indonesia. It is a medium-sized tree, with a spreading canopy which grows with a weeping habit. Ripe fruit is white, pink or red, and is described as honey-sweet.

== Genomics ==
A chromosome-level genome assembly of Morus macroura was published in 2026. The genome size is approximately 318.6 Mb, with 99.64% of the contig sequences anchored to 14 pseudo-chromosomes. The assembly has a BUSCO completeness of 97.21%, and 21,824 protein-coding genes were predicted. The assembly provides a resource for understanding genetic mechanisms underlying low chilling requirement and year-round fruiting.
